= 1911 in aviation =

This is a list of aviation-related events from 1911:

== Events ==
- The French Navy selects the torpedo boat tender Foudre for conversion into France's first ship capable of carrying and handling airplanes. She will become the first warship to be permanently altered for use as an aviation ship.
- The Austro-Hungarian Navy establishes an experimental naval air station at Pola.
- Imperial Japanese Navy officers arrive in France and the United States for flight instruction and to study the production and maintenance of airplanes. They will return to Japan in 1912 as Japan's first naval aviators.
- Imperial Japanese Navy Lieutenant Tetsukichi Isobe privately builds a seaplane out of bamboo. He pilots it for 60 meters (197 feet), reaching an altitude of 3 meters (10 feet), before the seaplane overturns. Although lacking any official association with the navy, it is the first flight in Japan by a member of the Imperial Japanese Navy.
- The British Army renames the observation balloon elements of the Royal Engineers: The Balloon Section becomes the Air Battalion, and the Balloon Factory becomes the Army Aircraft Factory.

=== January–March ===
- 18 January – Eugene Ely lands on a platform constructed over the deck of the armored cruiser USS Pennsylvania anchored in San Francisco Bay. This is the first time an aircraft lands on a ship.
- 31 January
  - The United States Navy destroyer Paulding recovers Canadian civilian aviator John A. D. McCurdy after he is forced down at sea while he attempting a flight from Key West, Florida, to Havana, Cuba. He was unable to take off using an aircraft platform installed in November 1910, which had a hinged extension that could be lowered to sea level, as his airplane was too badly damaged during the recovery to continue its journey.
  - The armored cruiser USS Pennsylvania conducts the United States Navy's only experiment with a man-lifting kite.
- 5 February – The first undisputed aeroplane flight in New Zealand is made by Vivian Walsh at Auckland in a Howard Wright biplane named Manurewa.
- 17 February – At San Diego, California, Glenn Curtiss flies a prototype seaplane out to the U.S. Navy armored cruiser Pennsylvania in the harbor. Pennsylvania hoists the seaplane aboard, then returns it to the water, and Curtiss flies it back to shore. It is the first demonstration that a ship can handle a seaplane.
- 18 February
  - The first airmail is carried by an aeroplane. Henri Pequet carries mail across the Jumna River, from Allahabad to Naini Junction, India.
  - The Spanish Air Force is created as the Aeronáutica militar Española, with four aircraft.
- 19 February – Dimitri Sensaud de Lavaud flew in São Paulo, Brazil with another airplane, a Blériot bought from Giulio Piccolo, an Italian aviator who had an accident and died in São Paulo in 1910. Dimitri's flight with this airplane took place in the area where Palestra Itália Stadium, now known as Parque Antarctica, would be built in the future.
- 21 February – First flight in China, by René Vallon in Shanghai.
- 1 March – The first four Royal Navy pilots, Lieutenants Charles R. Samson, R. Gregory, and Arthur M. Longmore of the Royal Navy and Lieutenant E. L. Gerrard of the Royal Marine Light Infantry, report for flight training at Eastchurch airfield, using borrowed Short S.27 aircraft.
- 7 March – In a Farman MF.7 biplane, Eugène Renaux wins the Prix d'Aviation Michelin ("Michelin Aviation Award") — which had been announced in March 1908 as a sister award of the Michelin Cup — by becoming the first person to take off from either the French department of Seine or Seine-et-Oise, fly over the Arc de Triomphe in Paris and Clermont-Ferrand Cathedral in Clermont-Ferrand, and land on the summit of the 1,456-metre (4,777-foot) Puy de Dôme in less than six hours.
- 23 March – Louis Breguet carries 11 passengers a distance of 5 km (3.1 mi).

=== April–June ===
- 1 April – The first flying unit of the British military, the Air Battalion Royal Engineers, is formed.
- 11 April – Imperial Japanese Army officer Yoshitoshi Tokugawa makes the first flight from Japan's first permanent airfield at Tokorozawa, piloting a Farman III biplane.
- 12 April – Pierre Prier makes the first non-stop flight from London to Paris in 3 hours and 56 minutes.

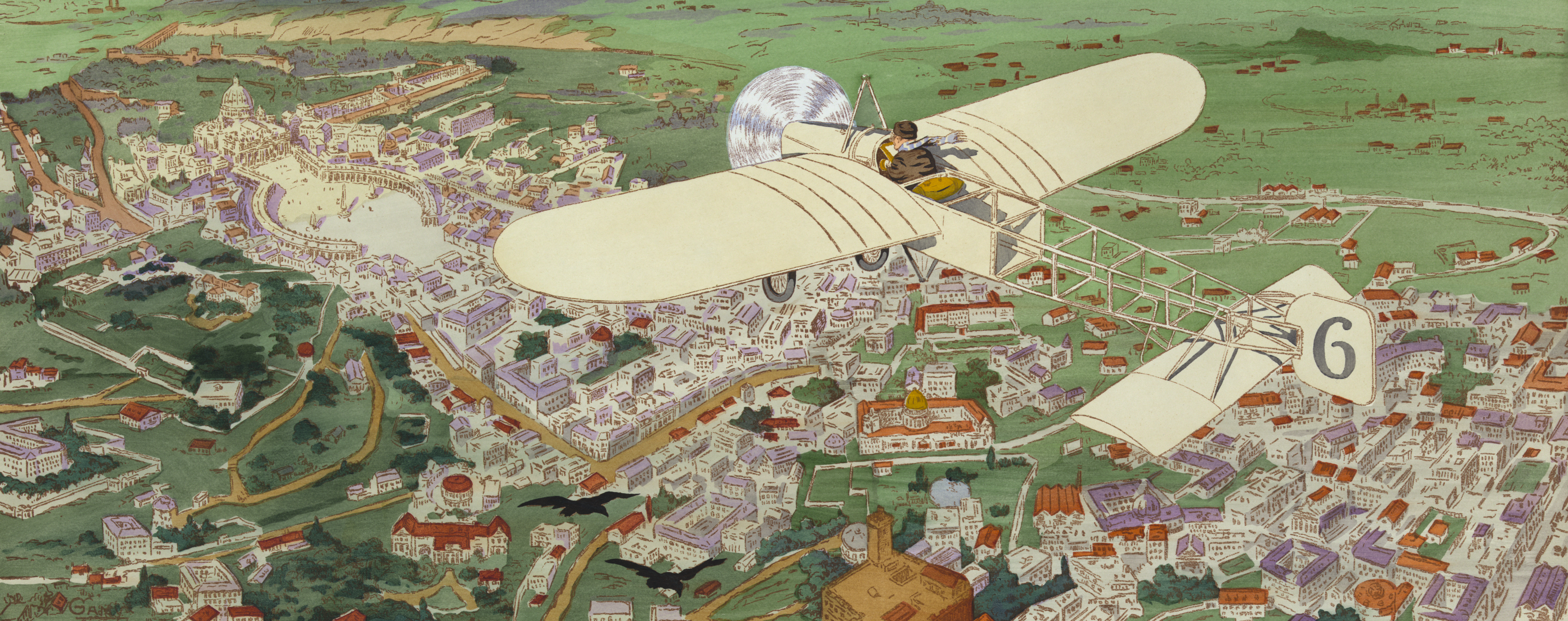
Beaumont' Bleriot monoplane

- 6 May – Flying a Sommer 1910 biplane at Shanghai, René Vallon becomes the first aviation fatality in China.
- 8 May – The United States Navy creates its aviation service and orders its first airplane, a Curtiss Model D.
- 21 May
  - At the start of the 1911 Paris to Madrid air race, a monoplane making a forced landing runs into a crowd of spectators, injuring French Prime Minister Ernest Monis, French Minister of War Henri Maurice Berteaux, and oil tycoon Henri Deutsch de la Meurthe. Berteaux soon dies of his injuries.
  - During the Paris to Madrid race, Eugene Gilbert encounters a large eagle over the Pyrenees in one of the first bird strike incidents.
- 31 May – Andre Beaumont beats Roland Garros in the Paris to Rome air race, completing the 1,465 km (910 mi) course in 28 hours, 5 minutes.
- 18 June – The 1911 Circuit of Europe air race begins. It involves flights between towns in Belgium, France, the Netherlands, and England.
- 27 June – To win a $1,000 prize from the U.S.-Canadian Carnival for making history's first flight over Niagara Falls, American pilot Lincoln J. Beachey takes off into a drizzle in a Curtiss D biplane before 150,000 spectators and flies over the lower falls of Niagara Falls, then above American Falls. During a gradual climb, he circles over the falls several times, then dives into the mists of the falls, coming to within 6 meters (20 feet) of the surface of the Niagara River and passing under the Honeymoon Bridge at that altitude, becoming the first person to fly under a Niagara Falls bridge. At a speed of 80 km/h (50 mph), he concludes by flying over the river down the length of the Niagara Gorge.

=== July–September ===
- 1 July – Harry N. Atwood becomes the first person to fly over New York City in an airplane.
- 4 July
  - The first ever airborne commercial cargo is flown by Horatio Barber in his Valkyrie B tail-first monoplane. The General Electric company pays £100 to have a box of Osram electric lamps flown from Shoreham-by-Sea to Hove in England.
  - One of the Chicago metropolitan area's earliest dedicated aviation facilities officially opens for use in Cicero, Illinois, as the Cicero Flying Field established by the Aero Club of Illinois.
- 9 July – Second Lieutenant Ștefan Protopopescu finishes his pilot training at Chitila, receiving the no.1 pilot's license of Romania.
- 14 July – Harry N. Atwood flies a record-breaking longest-distance flight by stages 576 miles (927 km) from Boston, Massachusetts, to Washington, D.C., landing on the White House lawn.
- 16 July – The LZ 10 Schwaben enters commercial service. It will go on to become the first commercially successful passenger aircraft.
- 21 July – Pilot Denise Moore (aka E. Jane-Wright) becomes the first woman to be killed in an airplane crash, at Etampes, France.
- 22 July–5 August – First Daily Mail Circuit of Britain air race, starting and finishing at Brooklands. The overall winner is Frenchman Lieut. Jean Louis Conneau flying as André Beaumont in a Blériot XI.
- 1 August – The Aero Club of America grants Harriet Quimby the first U.S. pilot's license issued to a woman. Matilde Moisant soon follows and becomes the country's second certified female pilot.
- 3 August – The French aviator and Voisin test pilot Maurice Colliex pilots the first amphibious aircraft, a Voisin Canard, over the River Seine in Paris.
- 22 August – Lydia Zvereva earns pilot certificate No. 31 from the Russian Aviation Association Flying School in Gatchina, Russia, becoming the first Russian woman to earn a pilot's license and the eighth woman worldwide to do so.
- 25 August – Harry N. Atwood completes an 11-day flight of 1,256 miles (2,021 km) from St. Louis, Missouri, to Governors Island in New York Harbor, setting a new airplane distance record, exceeding the previous record by 110 miles (180 km). Along the way, he makes 11 stops and spends 28 hours 31 minutes in the air.
- 29 August – Hilda Hewlett becomes the first British woman to receive a pilot's licence.
- 30 August – The first 2 (from an order of 6) serially produced aircraft in Romania are delivered to the Romanian Army.
- 8 September
  - Spaniard Carlos Tenaud, born in Paris, is killed at Lima, Peru.
  - Flying a Nieuport II monoplane, Emmanuel Helen covers 1,252.8 km (778.5 mi) in 14 hours 7 minutes. The flight wins him the 1911 International Michelin Cup for the longest distance flown nonstop between 1 January and 31 October 1911.
- 9 September – The first British airmail flight is made when Gustav Hamel flies from Hendon to Windsor.
- 15 September – French aeroplane designer and racing pilot Édouard Nieuport is killed in a flying accident. He was co-founder of the aircraft manufacturer Nieuport.
- 17 September – British aviator Reginald Archibald Cammell of the newly formed Air Battalion Royal Engineers is the first military pilot to die on active service in the UK
- 23 September
  - The first official airmail of the United States by fixed-wing aircraft is flown when Earle Ovington flies 6 miles (9.7 km) from Nassau Boulevard to Mineola on Long Island.
  - The second International Aviation Meet opens in New York.
- 24 September – Britain's first rigid airship, HMA No. 1 (also known as Hermione or "Mayfly"), built for the Royal Navy, breaks in half and is wrecked during a pre-commissioning ground test at her builders, Vickers of Barrow-in-Furness.

=== October–December ===
- 10 October – During an attempt to become the first person to cross the continental United States by air, Calbraith Rodgers breaks Harry Atwood's August 1,256 mile cross-country distance record reaching 1,398 miles (2,251 km).
- 14 October – Worldwide aviation deaths reach a total of 100.
- 19 October – During an aerobatic display at Macon, Georgia, American aviation pioneer Eugene Ely pulls out of a dive too late and crashes into the ground, breaking his neck. He jumps clear of the wreckage but dies minutes later.
- 22 October – A military airplane makes an operational flight for the first time when an Italian Army Blériot XI piloted by Captain Carlo Piazza flies from Tripoli to 'Aziziya to carry out reconnaissance of Ottoman Army positions in Libya during the Italo-Turkish War. Later in the day, an Italian Nieuport flown by a Captain Moizo becomes the first airplane to be damaged by enemy forces in combat when it suffers several hits from Turkish ground fire.
- 24 October – Orville Wright soars in a glider 9 minutes and 45 seconds over dunes near Kitty Hawk, North Carolina.
- 26 October – An airplane directs naval gunfire for the first time when an Italian Etrich Taube crewed by Captain Carlo Piazza and Lieutenant Giulio Gavotti spots fire for the Regia Marina (Italian Royal Navy) armored cruiser Carlo Alberto as she fires at Ottoman Army positions ashore in Libya.
- 31 October – John Montgomery is fatally injured in a crash of his Evergreen glider near San Jose, California.
- 1 November – An airplane conducts a wartime bombing mission for the first time, when Italian Lieutenant Giulio Gavotti, flying an Etrich Taube monoplane, drops four 2-kg (4.5-pound) bombs on Ottoman Army positions at Ain Zara and Tajura near Tripoli, Libya, during the Italo-Turkish War.
- 2 November – Calbraith Rodgers and Robert G. Fowler, who both are attempting the first coast-to-coast flight across the continental United States – Rodgers westbound and Fowler eastbound – meet in Tucson, Arizona Territory, where both are making a stopover.
- 5 November – Calbraith Rodgers completes the first coast-to-coast airplane flight across the continental United States in the Vin Fiz Flyer. The trip takes 49 days, with several crashes en route.
- 1 December – Royal Navy Lieutenant Arthur Longmore lands a float-equipped Short Improved S.27 in the River Medway, becoming the first person in the United Kingdom to take off from land and make a successful water landing.
- 19 December – In the biplane Black Diamond, Weldon B. Cooke becomes the first person to fly over 2,579-foot (786-meter) Mount Tamalpais in Marin County, California. He plans to land at Oakland, California, but Black Diamond's engine fails at an altitude of 2,000 feet (610 meters), and he glides to a deadstick landing in Mill Valley.

=== Deaths ===
- May 6 – René Vallon, French aviator (b. 1880)
- June 18 – Léon Lemartin, French aviator, test pilot and mechanic (b. 1883)
- July 13 – Daniel A. Kreamer, American aviator (b. 1870)
- August 15 – William R. Badger, American aviator (b. 1886)
- August 15 – St. Croix Johnstone, American aviator (b. 1887)
- September 8 – Carlos Tenaud Spanish aviator (b. 1884)
- September 17 – Reginald Cammell, Scottish pioneer aviator (b. 1886)
- December 2 – Tod Shriver, American aviator, mechanic (b. 1873)

== First flights ==
- Late 1911 – Caudron Type C
- Late 1911 – Caudron Type M
- Last 1911 – Caudron Type N

=== January ===
- 28 January – Caudron Type B

=== April ===
- 1 April – Avro Type D

=== July ===
- ca. July – Hydroaéroplane Caudron-Fabre

=== May ===
- 17 May – Blackburn Mercury

=== December ===
- Caudron Type D

== Entered service ==
- November – Caudron Type C with the French Army
