= Bristol Biplane Type 'T' =

General information
- Type: Single-seat sporting biplane
- Manufacturer: British and Colonial Aeroplane Company
- Designer: George Challenger
- Number built: 5

History
- Introduction date: 1911

The Bristol Biplane Type 'T', sometimes called the Challenger-Dickson Biplane, was a derivative of the Bristol Boxkite. It was built in 1911 by the British and Colonial Aeroplane Company and was designed as a cross-country racing aircraft for Maurice Tabuteau.

== Development ==
The Type 'T' was not a development of the Bristol Boxkite but did use some of the experience gained with the Boxkite. It was designed by George Challenger, with the assistance of practical advice from Captain Bertram Dickson, a prominent pilot of the day. It had the same "Farman" configuration as the Boxkite, differing principally in having an enclosed nacelle to house the pilot. The structure bearing the front elevator also differed substantially: the elevator was mounted lower down, level with the lower wing, and the undercarriage skids were continued forward and upwards to form part of the elevator mounting. The rear-mounted twin rudders were balanced, unlike those of the Boxkite. The first aircraft (Bristol No. 45) was built to compete in the 1911 Circuit de l'Europe race, with Maurice Tabuteau as pilot, and was powered by a 70 hp (52 kW) Gnome Gamma rotary engine. Tabateau put up a creditable performance, and completed all of the race's nine stages.

Four more aircraft were built for 1911 Daily Mail Circuit of Britain Air Race. These differed from the design of No. 45 in having a modified nacelle and rudders placed further out, away from the slipstream of the engine.

- No. 51 was to be flown by Graham Gilmour in the race but he was unable to compete because his licence had been suspended. After the race the aircraft was fitted with a 50 hp Gnome and sold to Gerald Napier but on 2 August 1911 it crashed at Brooklands, killing Napier.
- No. 52 had a 70 hp Gnome engine and was flown by Collyns Pizey.
- No. 53 had a 70 hp Gnome engine and was flown by Gordon England, and was withdrawn with engine problems.
- No. 54 had a 60 hp Renault engine and was to be flown by Howard Pixton, who crashed during the race and did not finish.

Maurice Tabuteau also entered the race in the original Type T No. 45 but none of Type Ts finished the race. After the crash of No. 51 none of the Type Ts were flown again. An additional machine, No. 59, was modified by Gordon England as the Challenger-England biplane. One more aircraft, No. 78, was to be fitted with a 100 hp Gnome engine but was never completed.

== The Challenger-England biplane ==
Under the direction of Gordon England one aircraft was later converted to a tractor configuration, powered by a 60 hp (45 kW) E.N.V. Type F water-cooled V-8 engine.

== Specifications (Type 'T') ==
Data from Bristol Aircraft Since 1910

General characteristics

- Crew: 1
- Length: 24 ft 6 in (7.47 m)
- Wingspan: 35 ft 0 in (10.67 m)
- Wing area: 350 sq ft (33 m^{2})
- Empty weight: 800 lb (363 kg)
- Gross weight: 1,000 lb (454 kg)
- Powerplant: 1 × Gnome Gamma 7-cylinder air-cooled rotary piston engine, 70 hp (52 kW)
- Propellers: 2-bladed fixed-pitch pusher propeller

Performance

- Maximum speed: 58 mph (93 km/h, 50 kn)

== See also ==
Related development

- Bristol Boxkite
