= Oscar Colin Morison =

English aviator (1884–1966)

- Born: 22 November 1884; Dulwich, London
- Died: 17 May 1966 (aged 81); Bournemouth, Dorset

Oscar Colin Morison (1884–1966) was an early English aviator who served in the First World War in the Royal Flying Corps and the Royal Naval Air Service.

== Life ==
Morison was born at Dulwich, London on 22 November 1884.

=== Aviator ===
Morison gained his Royal Aero Club aviators certificate (No. 46) on 31 December 1910 at Brooklands Aerodrome using a Bleriot monoplane. He flew exhibition flights in the early days of aviation in England. In 1911 he entered the Daily Mail Circuit of Britain Air Race but failed to start. On 7 March 1911 he became the first aviator to fly into Shoreham Aerodrome in a Bleriot monoplane. In May 1911 he was in a well publicized air-race with Graham Gilmour from Shoreham Aerodrome to the eastern boundary of Brighton at Blackrock, Morison taking the straight course passed the winning post one minute before Gilmour.

He married Margaret Cleaver at Brighton in 1912.

=== Military service ===
With the outbreak of the First World War, Morison was commissioned in the Royal Flying Corps as a Second Lieutenant, in May 1916 he transferred to the Royal Naval Volunteer Reserve. Morison was promoted Temporary Major in the Royal Air Force when it was formed in 1918.

Morison rejoined the RAF in 1940 with a temporary commission for the duration of hostilities.

=== Later life ===
Morison died on 17 May 1966 in Bournemouth, being styled as a "Gentleman".
