= James Valentine (RFC officer) =

English aviator (1887–1917)

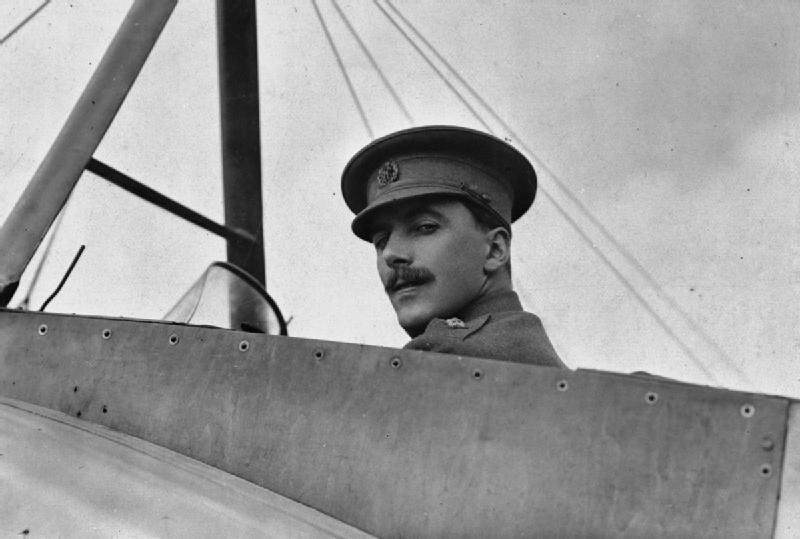
- Born: 22 August 1887; Lambeth, London, England
- Died: 7 August 1917 (aged 29); Kieff, Russia
- Military career
- Allegiance: United Kingdom
- Branch: Royal Flying Corps
- Service years: 1914-1917
- Rank: Lieutenant-Colonel
- Nickname: Jimmy
- Conflicts: First World War
- Awards: Distinguished Service Order

Lieutenant-Colonel James Valentine DSO (1887 – 1917) was an early English aviator who died during the First World War, serving in the Royal Flying Corps.

== Early life ==
Valentine was born in Lambeth, London on 22 August 1887, the son of James and Fanny Valentine. His father was a general manager of an insurance company in 1891.

== Aviator ==
Valentine gained his Royal Aero Club aviators certificate (No. 47) on 31 December 1910 at Brooklands Aerodrome using a Macfie Biplane. In 1911, flying a Deperdussin, he was one of only four airmen to complete the Circuit of Britain race and was the only British aviator to compete in the Circuit of Europe race. He was one of the few competitors to complete the course. In the Aerial Derby of eighty-one miles around London on 3 June 1912, Valentine was third flying a Bristol Prier monoplane.

In 1913 he married Louisa Eileen Knox in London.

== Royal Flying Corps ==
With the outbreak of the First World War Valentine joined the Royal Flying Corps in 1914. On 7 August 1917 Valentine died aged 29 as result of wounds at Kieff in Russia (now Kyiv, Ukraine). He is commemorated on the Archangel Memorial to men who died in the north Russian campaign and whose graves are not known.

== Honours and awards ==
He was awarded the Silver Medal of the Royal Aero Club for his aviation achievements in 1912 Valentine was awarded the second Royal Aero Club Special certificate on 6 December 1911;

- 8 November 1915 - Lieutenant (temporary Captain) James Valentine, Royal Flying Corps (Special Reserve) was appointed a Chevalier of the Légion d'honneur by the President of France for distinguished service in the field.
- 4 June 1917 - Captain (temporary Major) James Valentine was appointed a Companion of the Distinguished Service Order for distinguished service in the field.
- Russian Order of St. George 4th Class.
