= Daily Mail Circuit of Britain air race =

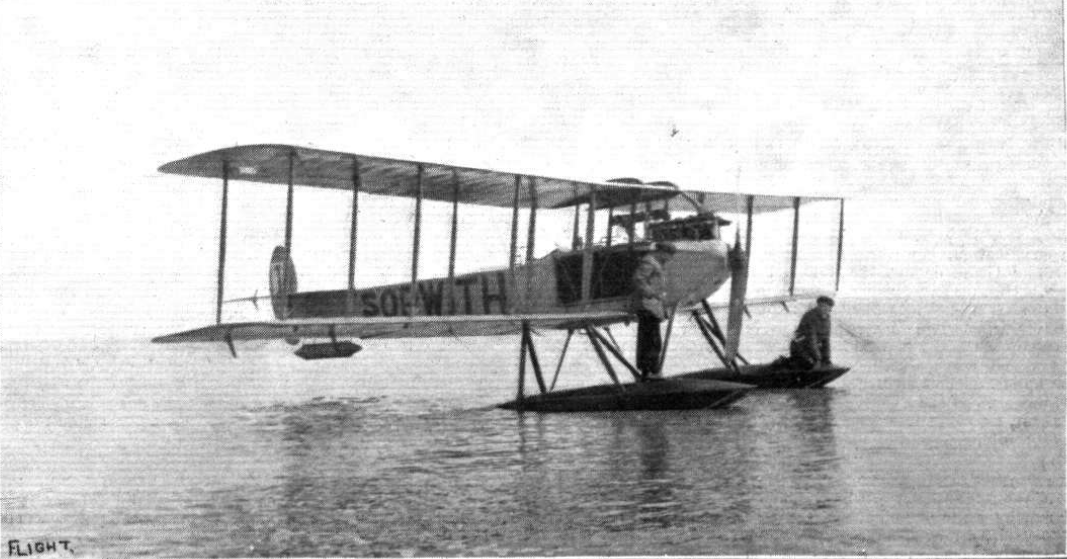
Sopwith Biplane - entrant in the 1913 Circuit of Britain

The Daily Mail Circuit of Britain air race was a British cross-country air race that took place from 1911 until 1914, with prizes donated by the Daily Mail newspaper on the initiative of its proprietor, Lord Northcliffe. It was one of several races and awards offered by the paper between 1906 and 1925.

The 1911 race took place on 22 July and was a 1,010 miles (1,630 km) event with 11 compulsory stops and a circular route starting and finishing at Brooklands in Surrey. The winner was Jean Conneau in a Blériot XI who took 22 hours, 28 minutes to complete the course, an average speed of 45 mph (72 km/h) and received the first prize of £10,000. The runner up was Jules Védrines in a Morane-Borel monoplane with James Valentine, in a Deperdussin, third.

The 1913 race was for British seaplanes and had a first prize of £5,000. Only one aircraft started the course; it was damaged when landing near Dublin, and did not complete the course.

The 1914 race, also offering a prize of £5,000, was to have been held between 1 and 15 August. It was cancelled due to the outbreak of the First World War.

== 1911 competition ==
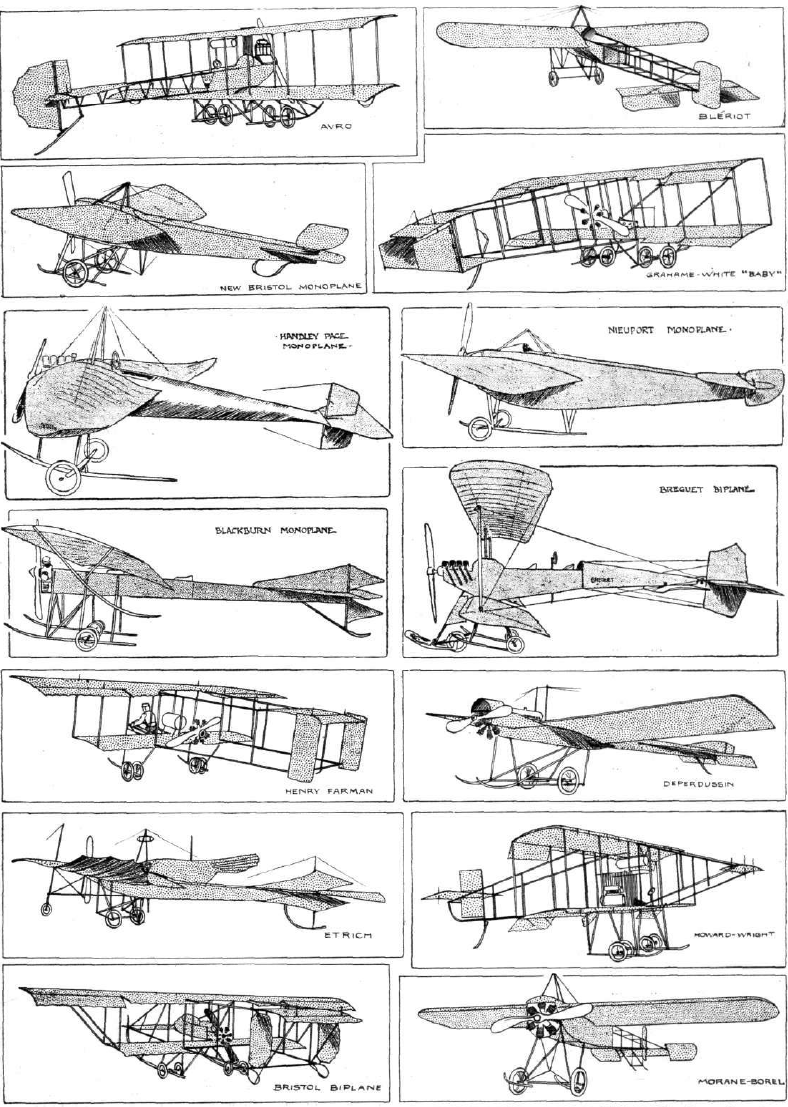
The competing aircraft

The 1911 Daily Mail Circuit of Britain was a contest for the fastest completion of a course around Great Britain. The proprietors of the Daily Mail offered a £10,000 prize to any aviator to complete an approximately 1,000-mile (1,600 km) circuit of Britain in the shortest time. The contest was run by the Royal Aero Club and was held between 22 July 1911 and 5 August 1911. Following the success of the £10,000 competition for the 1910 London to Manchester air race, the editor announced that a further £10,000 prize would be awarded, it would either be between London and Edinburgh and return or London and Paris and return.

It was decided that the competition would be a tour round Great Britain and a committee of the Royal Aero Club was formed to set the rules and organize the competition on behalf of the Daily Mail. For an entrance fee of £100 the event was open to all licensed aviators, and as well as the Daily Mail prize a number of smaller prizes were also offered. The circuit was to start and finish at Brooklands, and the competitors had to land at Hendon, Harrogate, Newcastle, Edinburgh, Stirling, Glasgow, Carlisle, Manchester, Bristol, Exeter, Salisbury and Brighton. Four competitors completed the course, the first and winner of the prize was the Frenchman Lieut Jean Louis Conneau, flying under the name of André Beaumont.

=== Competitors ===
Competition number	Airman	Aeroplane	Notes
1	André Beaumont	Blériot XI	Completed course – First to return to Brooklands and winner of the £10,000 prize. Although flying as "André Beaumont" he was a Lieutenant Jean Louis Conneau of the French Navy.
2	H.J.D. Astley	Universal Aviation Company Birdling monoplane	Landed at Irthlingborough due to sickness.
3	Brindejonc des Moulinais	Morane-Borel monoplane	Non-starter – in hospital in France due to an accident
4	R.C. Fenwick	Handley Page Type D	Aircraft crashed before the start
5	Lt. J.C. Porte, RN	Deperdussin monoplane	Started but crashed after 400 yards
6	Ronald C. Kemp	Avro Type D	Aircraft crashed before the start
7	C. Compton Paterson	Grahame-White Baby	Retired at Hendon
8	O.C. Morison	Bristol aeroplane	Did not start
9	Jules Védrines	Morane-Borel monoplane	Completed course, first to Hendon and was the second to arrive back at Brooklands.
10	James Radley	Antoinette VIII monoplane	Did not start
11	G. Blanchet	Breguet Type III	First stage only completed, damaged aircraft in a forced landing at Streatley. It was repaired but he hit a tree after takeoff and wrecked the aircraft.
12	Lt. R.A Cammell, RE	Blériot XI	First stage only completed, retired after a forced landing east of Wakefield.
13	E. Audemars	Blériot XI	First stage only completed, retired after two attempts to travel north from Hendon were stopped by fog.
14	James Valentine	Deperdussin monoplane	Completed course, third to arrive back at Brooklands.
15	Grahame Gilmour	Bristol Type T biplane	Withdrew before start after his aviator's licence was suspended
16	E.C. Gordon-England	Bristol Type T biplane	Engine problems
17	Collyns Price Pizey	Bristol Type T biplane	Delayed at Melton Mowbray when starting engine after he stopped to change his propeller. Repaired his machine but it was damaged the next day in another attempt to leave Melton Mowbray
18	Pierre Prier	Bristol Prier monoplane	Crashed before the start
19	C. Howard Pixton	Bristol Type T biplane	Crashed at Spofforth and retired
20	S.F. Cody	Cody Circuit of Britain biplane	Completed course as the fourth and last to finish
21	Maurice Tabuteau	Bristol Type T biplane	Did not start
22	F. Conway Jenkins	Blackburn Mercury	Crashed on take-off
23	Olivier de Montalent	Breguet Type III	Retired following a forced landing near Wetherby where he broke his propeller.
24	Gustav Hamel	Blériot XI	Reached Thornhill, north of Dumfries, before he retired.
25	Lt. H.R.P. Reynolds, RE	Howard Wright 1910 Biplane	Retired after aircraft was damaged at Harrogate.
26	Robert Loraine	Nieuport monoplane	Did not start
27	Bentfield Hucks	Blackburn Mercury	Landed at Barton near Luton with engine problems.
28	C.T. Weymann	Nieuport monoplane	Retired following a forced landing north-east of Leeds
29	H. Wijnmalen	Farman HF10 3-Seater Pusher Biplane	Failed to start due to engine problems
30	Lt. H. Bier	Etrich Taube	Aircraft damaged in a landing at Codicote near Hatfield after radiator problems. Only aircraft with a passenger Lt. C. Banfield.

=== Stage 1 Brooklands to Hendon ===
The race began at Brooklands on 22 July 1911 with a short 20-mile (32 km) section to Hendon Aerodrome. Only 21 of the 30 competitors started and 19 headed for Hendon, of which 17 arrived.

=== Stage 2 Hendon to Edinburgh ===
The competitors started to depart on the second stage on 24 July 1911 for the 343 miles (552 km) from Hendon to Edinburgh with two compulsory stops:

- Hendon to Harrogate 182 miles (293 km) – five made it to Harrogate
- Harrogate to Newcastle 68 miles (109 km)
- Newcastle to Edinburgh 92 miles (148 km) – the same five later reached Edinburgh

=== Stage 3 Edinburgh to Bristol ===
Total distance 383 miles (616 km) with stops at Stirling, Glasgow, Carlisle, and Manchester.

- Edinburgh to Stirling 31 miles (50 km)
- Stirling to Glasgow 22 miles (35 km)
- Glasgow to Carlisle 86 miles (138 km)
- Carlisle to Manchester 103 miles (166 km)
- Manchester to Bristol 141 miles (227 km)

Five started from Edinburgh but only four made it to Bristol, they were all to complete the contest.

=== Stage 4 Bristol to Brighton ===
Total distance 224 miles (360 km) with stops at Exeter, Salisbury Plain.

- Bristol to Exeter 65 miles (105 km)
- Exeter to Salisbury Plain 83 miles (134 km)
- Salisbury Plain to Brighton 76 miles (122 km)

=== Stage 5 Brighton to Brooklands ===
All competitors had to complete the last 40 miles (64 km) to Brooklands before 19:30 on 5 August 1911. Beaumont was the first to arrive back on 26 July 1911 – 1 hour 10 minutes before his fellow Frenchman Jules Vedrines – he had travelled 1,010 miles (1,630 km) in 22 hours 28 min 18 sec. Valentine arrived back on 4 August 1911, followed the next day by Cody, who was the fourth and the last to arrive at Brooklands on 5 August 1911.

=== Prizes ===
- Conneau won the £10,000 prize for the first to complete the circuit. He also won the Entente Cordiale prize of 50 guineas from the proprietors of Perrier table water for the first Frenchman to complete the course.
- Vedrine, Valentine and Cody all equal shares of prizes from Sir George White, the chairman of the British and Colonial Aeroplane Company (£250 total) and the British Petroleum Company Limited (125 guineas total) for finishing the course.
- Cody won a £50 prize from the Northumberland and Durham Aero Club for the first British machine to arrive in Newcastle.
- Valentine received a £50 tea service from the Harrogate Chamber of Trade for the first British aviator to reach Harrogate and a 100 guinea gold cup from the Brighton Hotels Association for the first British aviator to reach Brighton. He also won the Entente Cordiale prize of 50 guineas from the proprietors of Perrier table water for the first Englishman to complete the course.

== 1913 competition ==
The 1913 race, offering prize of £5,000, was for floatplanes, which had to be of all-British construction. The course, totalling 1,540 mi (2,480 km) had to be completed within 72 hours, although since no flying was allowed on Sundays this period was in practice a day longer.

The race was divided into the following stages:

- Southampton to Ramsgate — 144 mi (232 km)
- Ramsgate to Yarmouth — 96 mi (154 km)
- Yarmouth to Scarborough — 150 mi (240 km)
- Scarborough to Aberdeen — 218 mi (351 km)
- Aberdeen to Cromarty — 134 mi (216 km)
- Cromarty to Oban — 94 mi (151 km)
- Oban to Dublin — 222 mi (357 km)
- Dublin to Falmouth — 280 mi (450 km)
- Falmouth to Southampton — 202 mi (325 km)

Entrants included the Cody Waterplane, the Radley-England Waterplane and the Sopwith Circuit of Britain floatplane. Cody was killed during a test flight of his design on 7 August when his aircraft broke up in flight, and the Sopwith, flown by Harry Hawker with Harry Kauper as passenger, was the only aircraft to start; it retired after being damaged in an emergency landing near Dublin having completed about two-thirds of the course. Hawker was given a prize of £1,000 for his effort.
