= Deperdussin 1910 monoplane =

1910s French light aircraft

1910 Monoplane
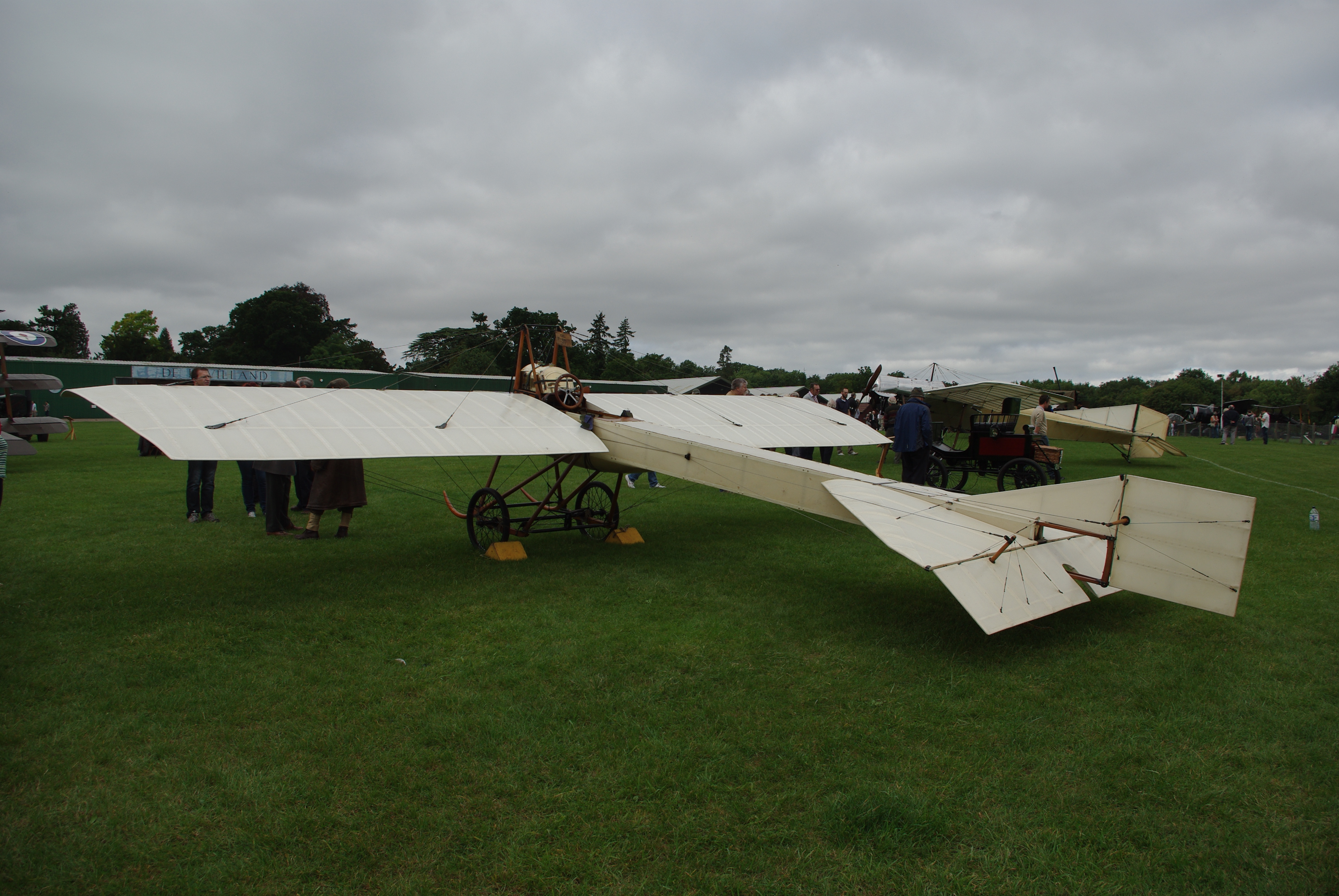
- Deperdussin monoplane belonging to the Shuttleworth Collection.

General information
- Type: Sports aircraft
- National origin: France
- Manufacturer: Aéroplanes Deperdussin
- Designer: Louis Béchereau

History
- First flight: 1910

The 1910 Deperdussin monoplane was the first aircraft to be built in significant quantities by Aéroplanes Deperdussin. The type was produced in a number of variants which were flown successfully in air races and gained several records during 1911, and was used by the Australian Central Flying School at Point Cook, Victoria. Several have survived, including an airworthy example in the Shuttleworth Collection in England.

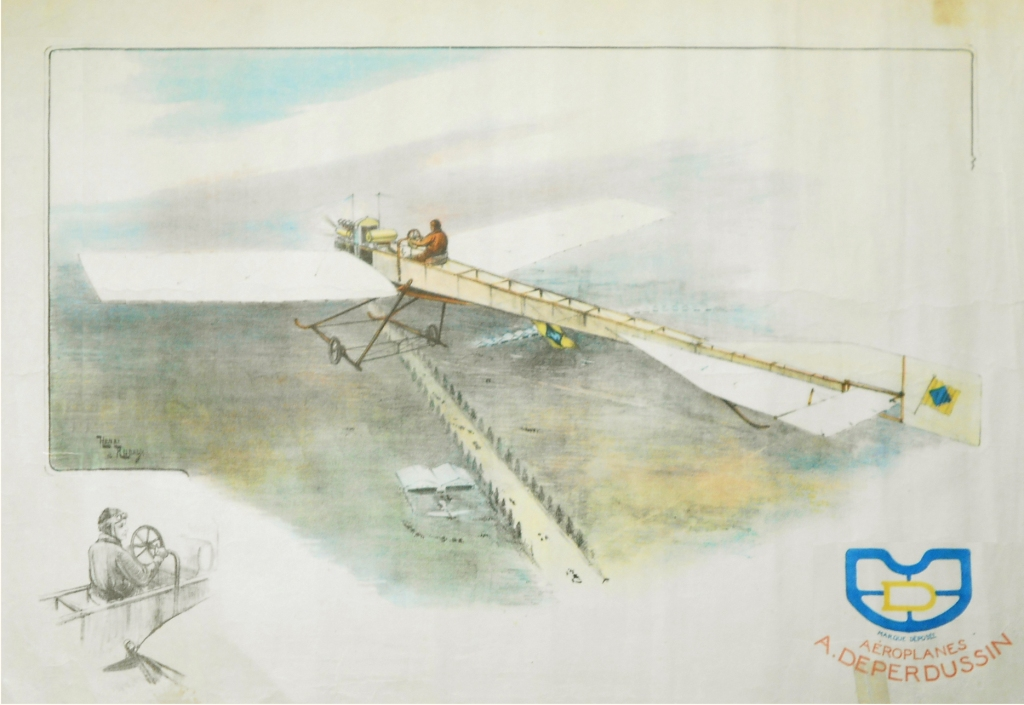
Early Deperdussin Monoplane

== Background ==
Aéroplanes Deperdussin was established in 1909 by the silk broker Armand Deperdussin with Louis Béchereau acting as the technical director. The first product of their aircraft works at Laon was a canard configuration design, which was not a success. The 1910 monoplane was their first successful design. The prototype was first flown by Guillaume Busson at Issy-les-Moulineaux in October 1910, powered by a water-cooled inline four-cylinder Clerget engine.

== Design and development ==
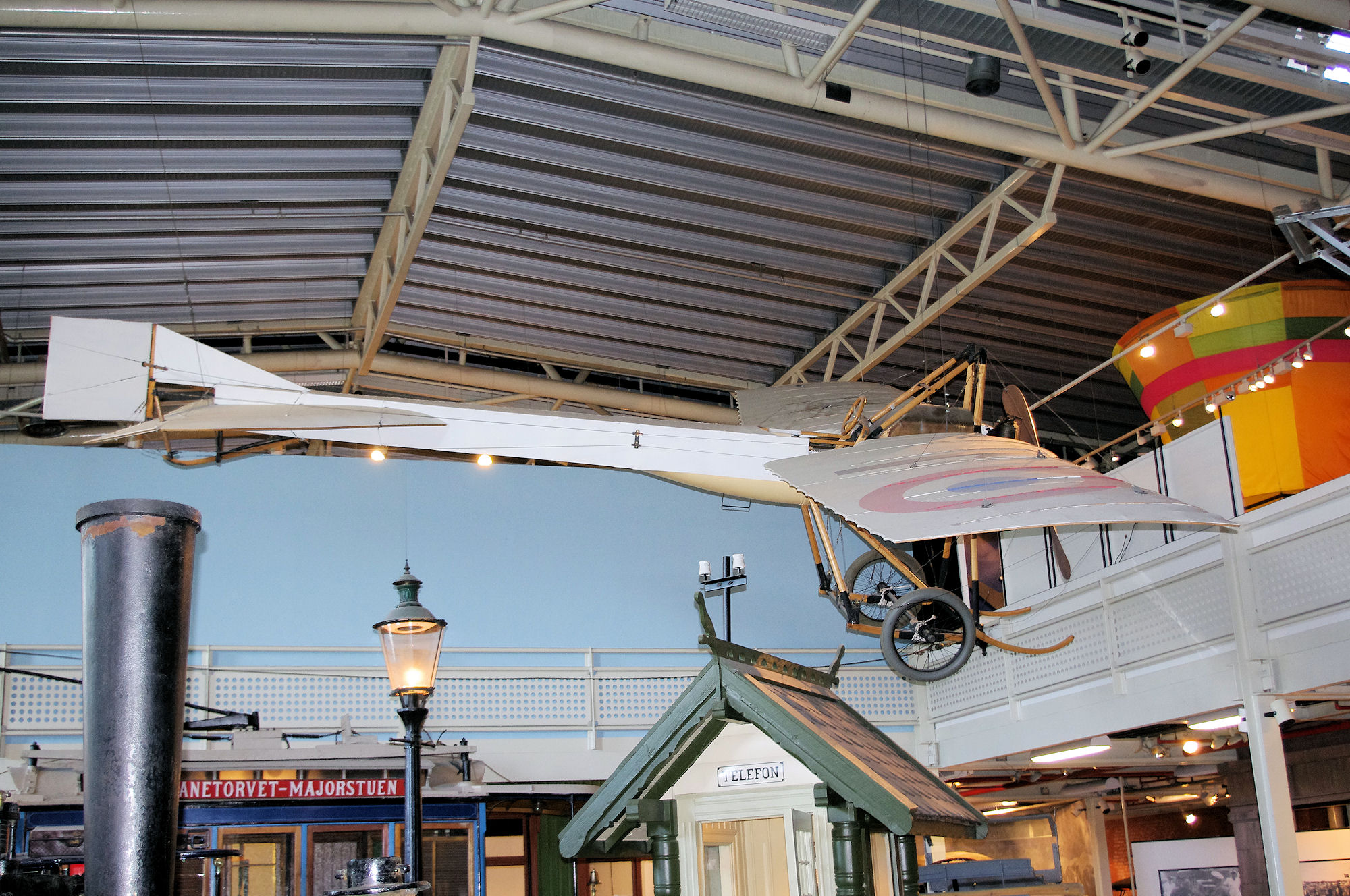
Deperdussin Type A, Norsk Teknisk Museum.

Controls of the Deperdussin monoplane

The 1910 Deperdussin monoplane was a tractor configuration mid-wing monoplane, with a very slender fuselage formed by a shallow fabric-covered wire-braced wooden box-girder, the longerons curving in to a vertical knife-edge at the back. The depth of the front section of the fuselage was increased by a shallow shell of wood veneer built over curved formers. Due to the extremely shallow fuselage, the pilot was almost completely exposed, sitting on rather than in the fuselage.

The wings were mounted below the upper longerons and were slightly tapered. Lateral control was by wing warping. In earlier aircraft the warping and bracing wires were attached to a pair of vertical kingposts just aft of the leading edge of the wing: in later aircraft these were braced by diagonal struts leading back to the fuselage longerons. The empennage of early examples consisted of an elongated triangular vertical fin with a cutout to allow elevator travel with a rectangular rudder hinged to the trailing edge, and a similarly elongated triangular tailplane with an elevator.

In later examples, such as that in the Shuttleworth Collection, the horizontal tail surface was shorter, the leading edges being swept at about 45°. A distinctive feature of the type was that the trailing edge of the rudder and elevator was braced by wires leading to the control horns. The controls consisted of a wheel mounted on an inverted U-shaped yoke, the uprights of which were outside the fuselage structure. Fore and aft movement of the entire yoke operated the elevator and the wheel operated the wing warping. The rudder was controlled by pedals. The undercarriage consisted of a pair of trapezoidal frames, each braced by a diagonal member extended forwards to form a short upcurved skid to protect the propeller in the case of nose-overs, with a pair of wheels carried on a sprung cross axle between the two frames.

== Variants and nomenclature ==
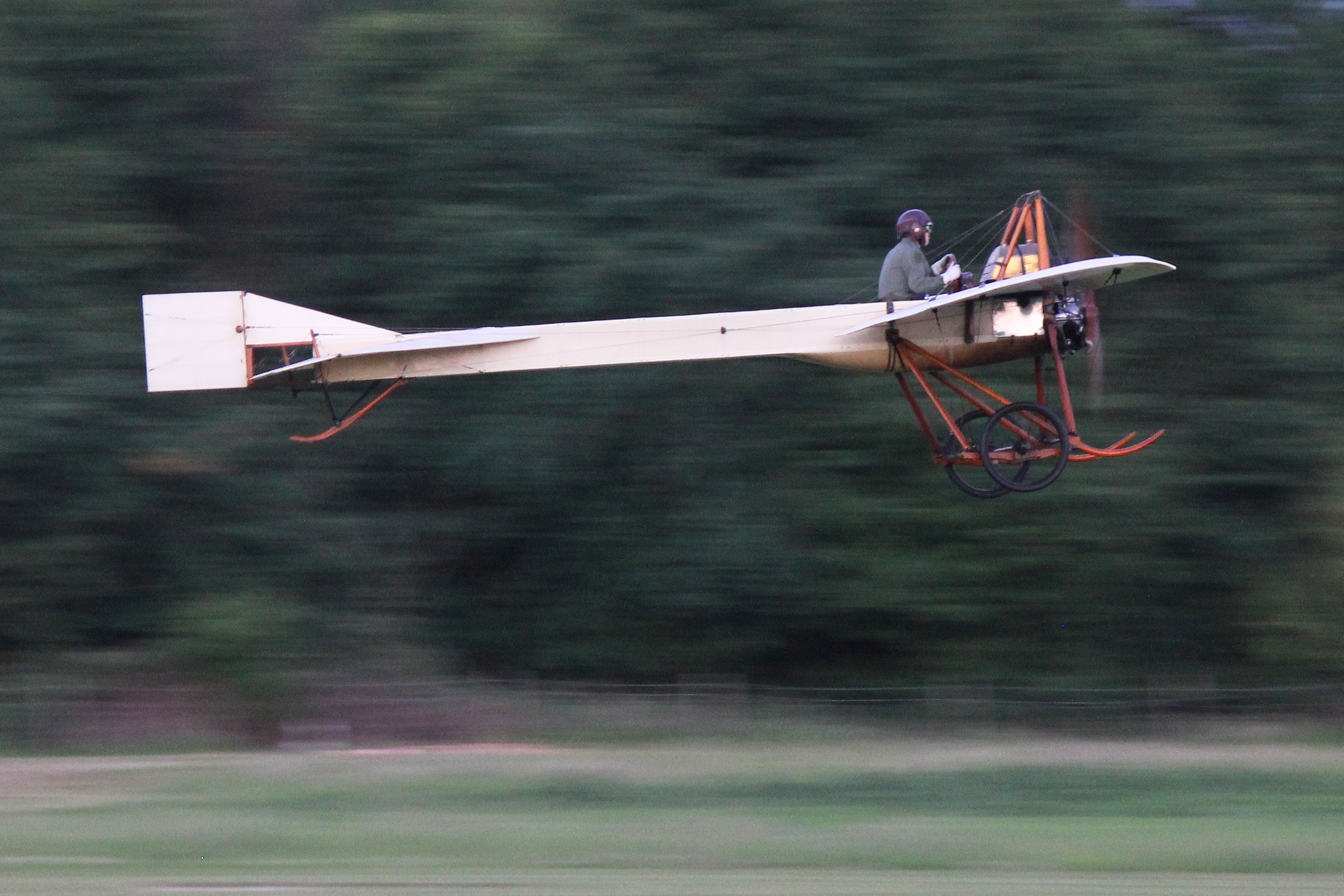
The Shuttleworth Deperdussin BAPC-4 in flight, 2017

The example shown at the 1910 Paris Aero Salon had a length and wingspan of 9 metres (29 ft 6 in), a wing area of 15 square metres (160 sq ft) and was powered by a 4-cylinder water-cooled Clerget engine driving a six-bladed propeller.

Although Deperdussin did produce a catalogue in 1911 which lists Types A, B, C, D and E, this system of nomenclature was not generally used at the time: an example of contemporary nomenclature is provided by the report in Flight on the 1911 Paris Aero Salon. Deperdussin exhibited four aircraft: these are described as the "School Type", the "Military single seater", the "Military two-seater" and the "Military three-seater". The "School Type" was powered by a 25 hp (19 kW) Anzani three-cylinder semi-radial engine and was 7.45 m (24 ft 5 in) long with a wingspan of 8.5 m (27 ft 11 in). The "Military single seater" was powered by a 50 hp (37 kW) Gnome Omega and was slightly longer at 7.5 m (24 ft 7 in). The "Military two-seater" was powered by a 70 hp (52 kW) Gnome Gamma and was 8 m (26 ft 3 in) long with a wingspan of 10 m (32 ft 10 in). The three-seater is described as being a different type.

Neither the Shuttleworth Collection nor the RAAF Museum use any type designation for the aircraft in their collections.

== Operational history ==
- On February 13 Busson set a new speed record for an aircraft carrying a passenger at Reims, flying 100 km (62 mi) in 1 h 1 min 32 s, a speed of 98.74 km/h (61.35 mph), bettering the previous record over the distance by more than 15 minutes. The aircraft was described as a "Military type 2/3 seater"
- On 10 March Busson set two more records over a 2.5 km (1.6 mi) circuit, carrying 3 passengers 50 km (31 mi) in 31 min 31.2 s, a speed of over 95 km/h (59 mph) and four passengers 25 km (16 mi) in 17 min 28.2 s.
- Rene Vidart won third place in the 1911 Circuit of Europe air race. Seven Deperdussins were entered in the race.
- James Valentine won third place in the Daily Mail 1911 Circuit of Britain race. Although Valentine did not succeed in completing the course inside the stipulated time limit, the simple fact of his finishing the course provided good publicity for Deperdussin.
- Second and third places in the Belgian National Circuit race, flown by Lanser and Hessel

Deperdussin, like most contemporary French aircraft manufacturers, also ran their own flying schools, at Étampes, Pau, and Bétheny in France and at Brooklands in England, and many early aviators learned to fly on Deperdussin aircraft.

Two examples were bought by the Australian government and formed part of the equipment of the Central Flying School at Point Cook, together with two Royal Aircraft Factory BE 2as and a Bristol Boxkite

== Survivors ==
- The Shuttleworth Collection based at Old Warden Aerodrome in Bedfordshire, UK has a 1910 airworthy example (G-AANH) powered by an Anzani Y-Type 30 hp 3-cylinder radial engine. The example is believed to be the 43rd Deperdussin produced and the world's second oldest airworthy type. It is flown at home airshows during the summer months subject to weather and serviceability.
- Norsk Teknisk Museum, Oslo
- RAAF Museum, Point Cook, Australia (Replica)
- Australian War Memorial

== Specifications ==
Data from Flight: 19 August 1911, p.714.

General characteristics

- Crew: 1
- Length: 7.24 m (23 ft 9 in)
- Wingspan: 8.76 m (28 ft 9 in)
- Wing area: 14 m^{2} (150 sq ft)
- Empty weight: 280 kg (617 lb)
- Powerplant: 1 × Anzani 3-cyl. Fan 40-45 hp 3 cylinder air-cooled semi-radial, 37 kW (50 hp)
- Propellers: 2-bladed, 2.44 m (8 ft 0 in) diameter

Performance

- Maximum speed: 90 km/h (56 mph, 49 kn)
