= Reginald Archibald Cammell =

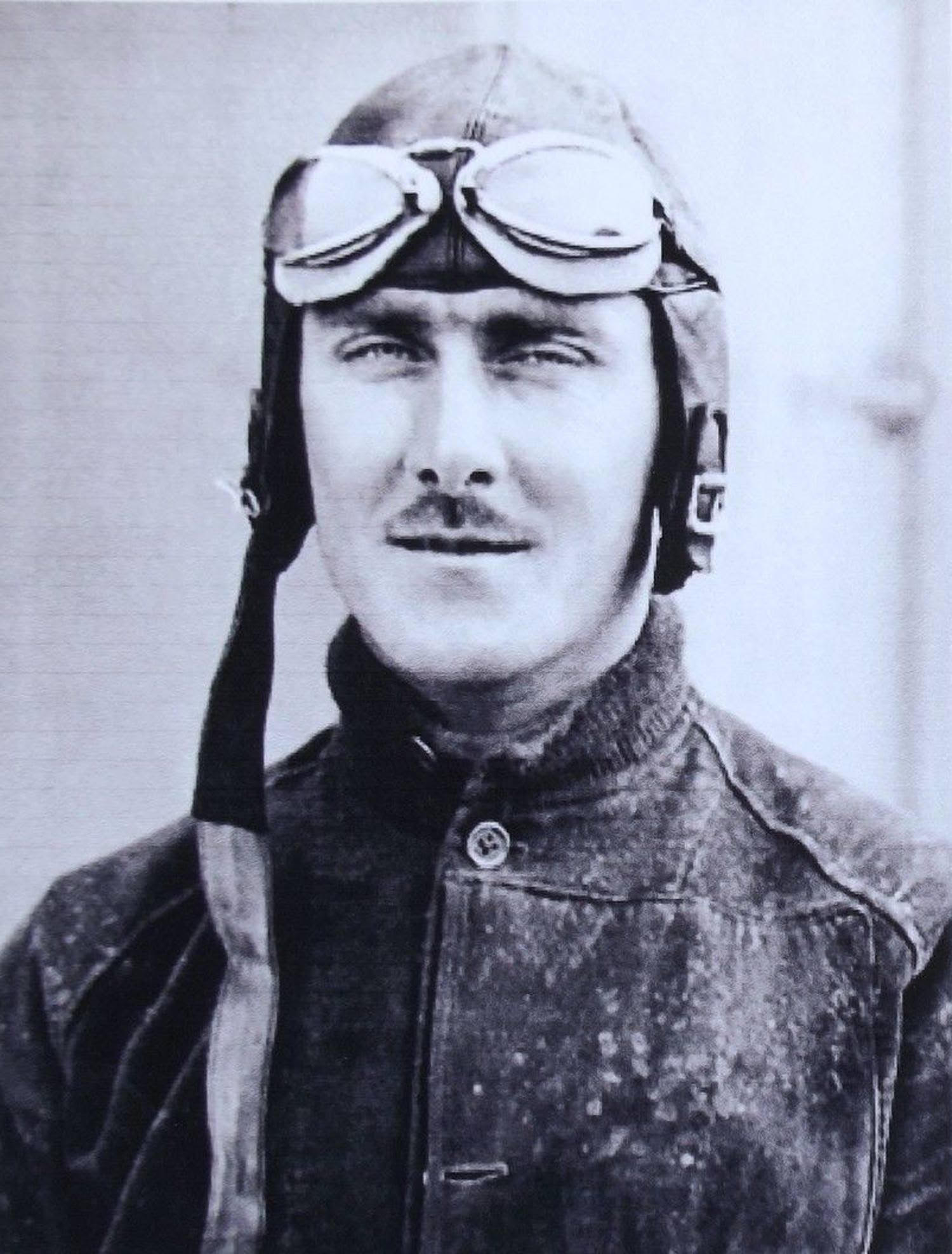
Lieutenant Reginald Archibald Cammell RE (1911)

Reginald Archibald Cammell (10 January 1886 – 17 September 1911) was an early British military aviator and the first to be killed on active service.

== Early life ==
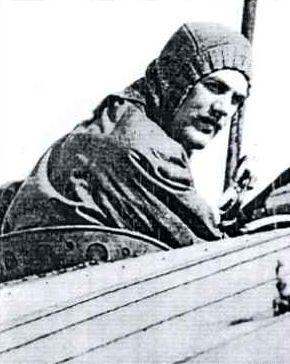
Lieutenant Reginald Archibald Cammell RE - Flight (1911)

Cammell was born in Inverness in Scotland in 1886, the oldest of three children of Katherine Marion née Orr (1860–1947) and Archibald Allan Cammell (1856–1911), an old Etonian formerly of the 21st Foot but serving as a lieutenant in the 14th Hussars when the couple married in Bangalore in India in 1880. Reginald Cammell's grandfather was the industrialist Charles Cammell (1810–1879) of Brookfield Manor in Hathersage, Derbyshire, whose company later became part of Cammell Laird. In 1891 aged 5 'Reggie' Cammell was living with his parents and younger siblings in Merrow in Surrey. The family had a governess, a nursery nurse, a cook and a parlour maid. His parents divorced in early 1911 as a result of his father's adultery with various women.

Reginald Cammell joined the Royal Engineers and was appointed second lieutenant on 25 July 1906, and promoted lieutenant on 22 November 1908. After gaining experience with the Army dirigibles he took up the new heavier-than air type of machines, joining No.2 Company of the newly formed Air Battalion Royal Engineers at Farnborough Airfield in 1908. He was one of only three officers in the Air Battalion who qualified in all forms of aircraft: balloons, man-lifting kites and aeroplanes. In December 1910 he took his Royal Aero Club aviator's test flying a Bristol Biplane Type 'T' at Salisbury Plain. The test required that he make three separate flights of three miles around a circular course without the aircraft touching the ground. At the end of each flight the engine had to be stopped in the air and the aircraft glided in to land within 150 yards of a location previously decided by the pilot and indicated to the officials. He gained his Royal Aero Club certificate on 7 January 1911 with the low number of 45 (making him the 45th man in Great Britain to qualify for his pilot licence). Cammell inherited Brookfield Manor on the death of his father in March 1911, and it is inscribed as his home on his headstone, but he could not have lived there for any length of time as he died six months later while the 1911 census lists him as living in Gibraltar Barracks in Aldershot with his regiment.

In April 1911 he became involved in test flying early aircraft and went to the Bleriot school at Étampes where he met "with commendable success" flying the Blériot XI, afterwards making numerous cross-country flights in England, first on single-seater, and later a two-seater, his aggregate mileage on the Bleriots approximating 2,000. In July 1911 he took part in the Daily Mail Circuit of Britain air race but only completed the first stage, retiring after a forced landing east of Wakefield.

== Flying career and fatal accident ==
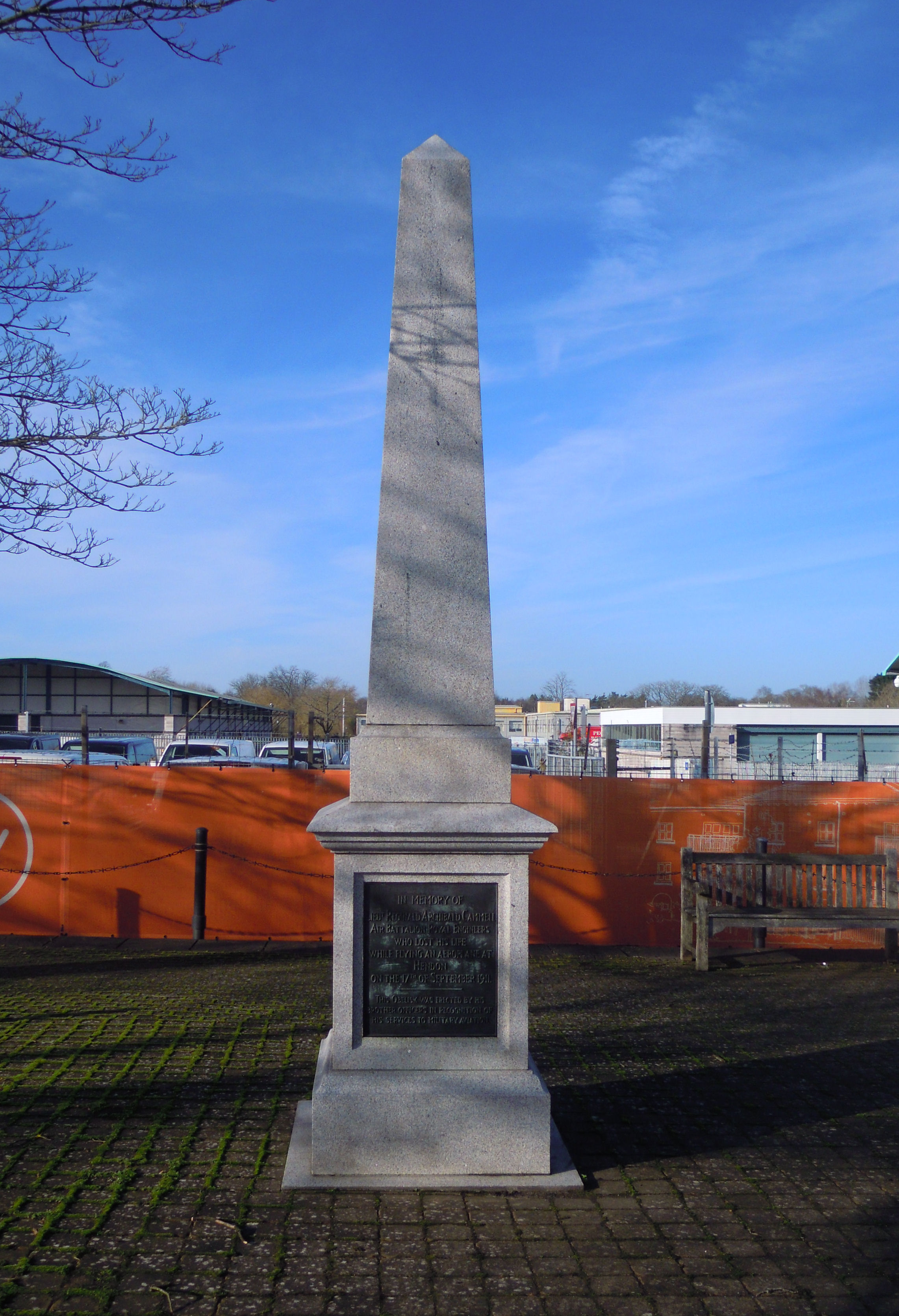
Cammell's memorial on Queen's Avenue in Aldershot (2020)

A skilful and experienced flier, on 17 September 1911, aged 25, Lieutenant Cammell was killed in the crash of a Valkyrie monoplane at Hendon Aerodrome. Cammell was testing the new 50 hp Gnome engine that had been fitted to the monoplane intending to after fly it over to his headquarters at Farnborough. When the breeze that had prevailed all day died down, Cammell took off to make a preliminary circuit. After his first circuit, Cammell took the aircraft up to about 100 feet (30 m) and attempted a spiral vol plane (a gliding spiral). Being unfamiliar with the controls, he turned the machine too sharply and losing control of the aircraft it plummeted to the ground. Cammell was thrown clear of the wreckage, but hitting the ground with his head, he suffered a severe concussion of the brain. The first to reach Cammell discovered that he was still alive but dead by the time he reached the Central London Sick Asylum, which adjoined the aviation grounds.

A 1922 account of the formation of the Royal Air Force states this was the only fatal accident in the Air Battalion.

== Inquest ==
An inquest into his death held at Hendon gave a verdict of "death by misadventure". Cammell's commanding officer at the Air Battalion, Major Sir Alexander Bannerman, stated that Cammell was "a bold yet careful flyer. He was not reckless, but was a man prepared to take risks if the necessity arose." Knowing that Cammell was going to fly a machine new to him, the Coroner, Dr. George Cohen, asked Bannerman whether Cammell minded flying it. Bannerman replied that "he had not in the least, but that as it was a strange machine to him he would not fly it in a wind, as he would his own machine — a Bleriot". Bannerman added that Cammell "was very fond of trying sharp turns on his own machine" and he conjectured that Cammell "might have tried to do too much." Dr. Cohen stated that there was no evidence that the aircraft was defective and that he believed that Lieutenant Cammell must have had "some temporary loss of knowledge or control of the machine and mistaken it for another".

== Burial at Aldershot ==
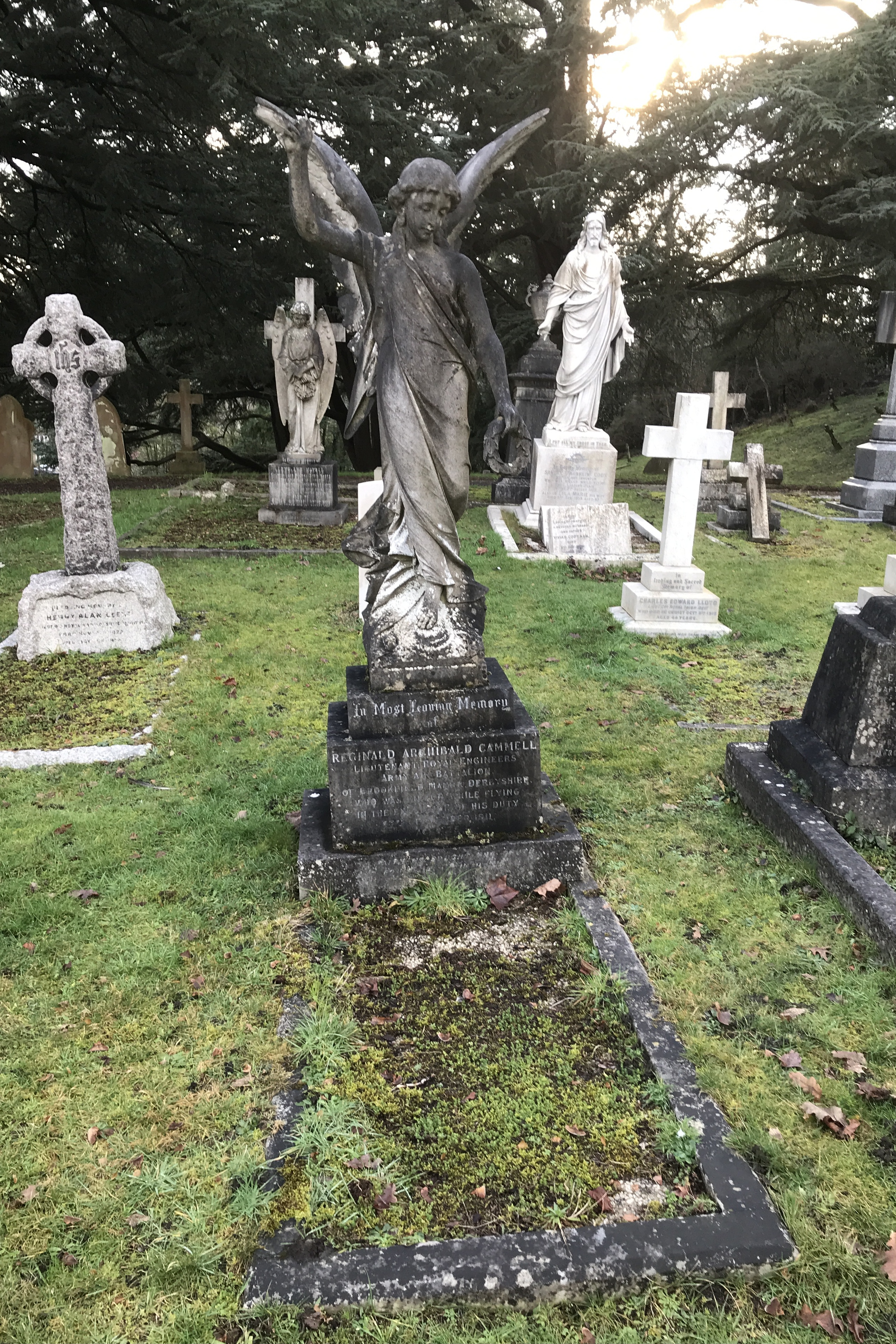
Cammell's grave in Aldershot Military Cemetery (2021)

Reginald Archibald Cammell was buried with full military honours in Aldershot Military Cemetery, and today his grave is just a few feet from that of aviation pioneer Samuel Franklin Cody. His mother and sister were the chief mourners while practically all the officers of the Air Battalion followed in the funeral procession. The coffin was carried to the graveside by non-commissioned men of the deceased's own battalion, and his brother officers acted as pallbearers. Cammell was unmarried and left his estate valued at £3,412 2s 8d to his recently widowed mother. Unusually, he and his father (who had died in March 1911) have adjoining entries in the Probate Register. His obelisk memorial opposite the Cathedral of St Michael and St George on Queen's Avenue in Aldershot has been a Grade II listed memorial on the Register of Historic England since 2010 owing to its historic significance "as commemorating a pioneer of military aviation, and marking the esteem in which he was held by fellow aviators. The monument is one of the oldest to commemorate the death of a pilot.
