= Howard Pixton =

Early British test pilot and racing pilot

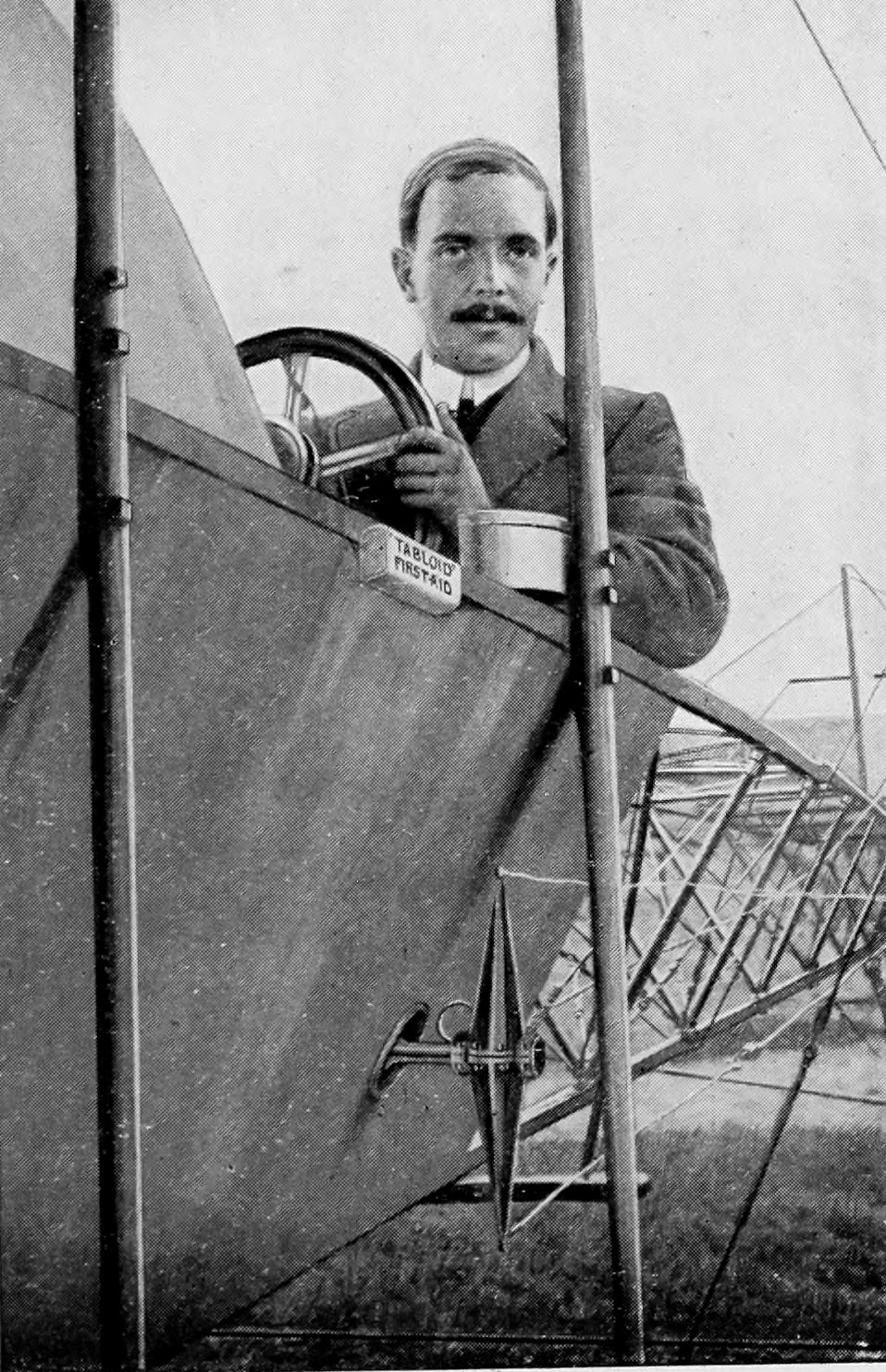
- Howard Pixton in an Avro biplane
- Born: Cecil Howard Pixton; 14 December 1885; West Didsbury, Manchester
- Died: 7 February 1972 (aged 86); Jurby, Isle of Man
- Resting place: Jurby Churchyard
- Education: Manchester Grammar School
- Known for: Test pilot; Racing pilot
- Spouses: Maude E Hallam, Winifred A Radford
- Relatives: Son: Jack, daughter: Stella
- Aviation career
- First flight: June 1910; Roe Triplane
- Famous flights: 1914 Schneider Trophy contest winner
- Flight license: 31 December 1910; Brooklands
- Air force: Royal Air Force
- Rank: Captain

Cecil Howard Pixton (14 December 1885 – 7 February 1972) was a British aeronautical engineer, test pilot and air racing pilot who was most famous for winning the 1914 Schneider Trophy seaplane race.

== Early life ==
Howard Pixton was the youngest of four boys born to John Pixton, a stockbroker, and his wife Elizabeth, living in West Didsbury, Manchester. They holidayed annually in the Isle of Man, and Howard was educated at Manchester Grammar School. He then worked at engineering companies, becoming a machine tool draughtsman, studying engineering in the evenings. He moved to Leek, Staffordshire to work for an engineering company to gain practical experience. Moving on to work for a local garage, he was asked to drive some customers to Germany, calling in at an aeronautical exhibition in Frankfurt on the way. Pixton thus saw his first aeroplane, and several airships, and having always been fascinated by the current advances in aviation he became determined to learn to fly.

In April 1910 he saw Claude Grahame-White and his Farman Box Kite at Lichfield having force-landed with engine trouble during his attempt to fly from London to Manchester to claim the £10,000 Daily Mail prize (equivalent to £1,018,400 in 2025).

This stirred Pixton to write to almost everyone connected with aviation asking for a job. He received a reply from Humphrey Verdon (H.V.) Roe from ‘Avroplanes’, A.V. Roe, of Brownsfield Mill, Ancoats, Manchester, where aeroplanes were being constructed to be flown by H.V.’s older brother, Alliott Verdon Roe at Brooklands. He was offered a job as a mechanic for A.V. at Brooklands, near Weybridge, Surrey, part of his remuneration being flying lessons. Pixton eagerly accepted.

== Avro ==
He arrived at Brooklands in June 1910 and after a few days Roe gave him his first flight, in one of his Triplanes. He became a pupil and then a friend of Roe, and soon replaced him as test pilot. He quickly became an instructor, demonstrator and pilot for passenger rides in Avro’s series of triplanes and the Type D biplane.

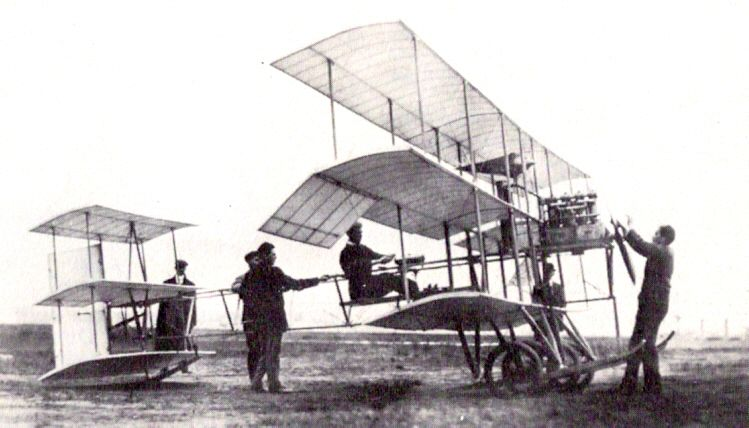
Roe III Triplane

The first air meeting Pixton attended was at Blackpool in July, with AV Roe and others along with two Roe III Triplanes. The Triplanes, along with spares, tools and personal belongings, were sent by rail, and Pixton was by chance on the same train. Approaching Preston, sparks from the engine set fire to the tarpaulin covering the aircraft, and Pixton watched as the whole truck and its contents were consumed by the fire. The next day the Avro team rushed to the factory in Manchester and were able to construct a new aircraft from spares within three days, and they took part in the later part of the week-long meeting, Pixton making his first display flight there.

At the 1910 Blackpool meeting A.V. Roe had met a member of the Harvard University Aeronautical Society who ordered a Triplane and invited him to attend their first flying meeting in September. Pixton and others were to accompany him on what was to be a one-month trip. After the Atlantic voyage (with Pixton and other lowly colleagues travelling steerage) they arrived at the Squantum Flying Ground outside Boston on 1 September.

Once the two Triplanes that they had brought with them were erected, A.V. Roe flew one but stalled at 60 feet (18 m) and was injured in the resulting crash. He recovered sufficiently to return to the airfield and fly the other Triplane, crashing yet again but without hurting himself further. This was the machine bought by the Americans. Roe and the rest of the team returned to Britain, leaving Pixton to assemble a working aircraft from the two wrecks, deliver it to the University, and sell them the remaining parts as spares, the money from which would pay for his fare home. He accomplished all of this and received enough money to travel second class on the voyage home, which was completed by the end of October.

Back at Brooklands, which was now a thriving centre of aviation development and training, Pixton resumed his normal activities, including giving many pleasure flights. He got to know nearly all the important people in British aviation at the time, including Grahame-White, Gordon England, Samuel Cody (with whom Pixton became the best of friends), James Vallentine, John Alcock, and Mrs Hilda Hewlett and Gustav Blondeau who together would form a flying school and an aircraft manufacturing business, C. G. Grey (influential founding editor of The Aeroplane) and many more.

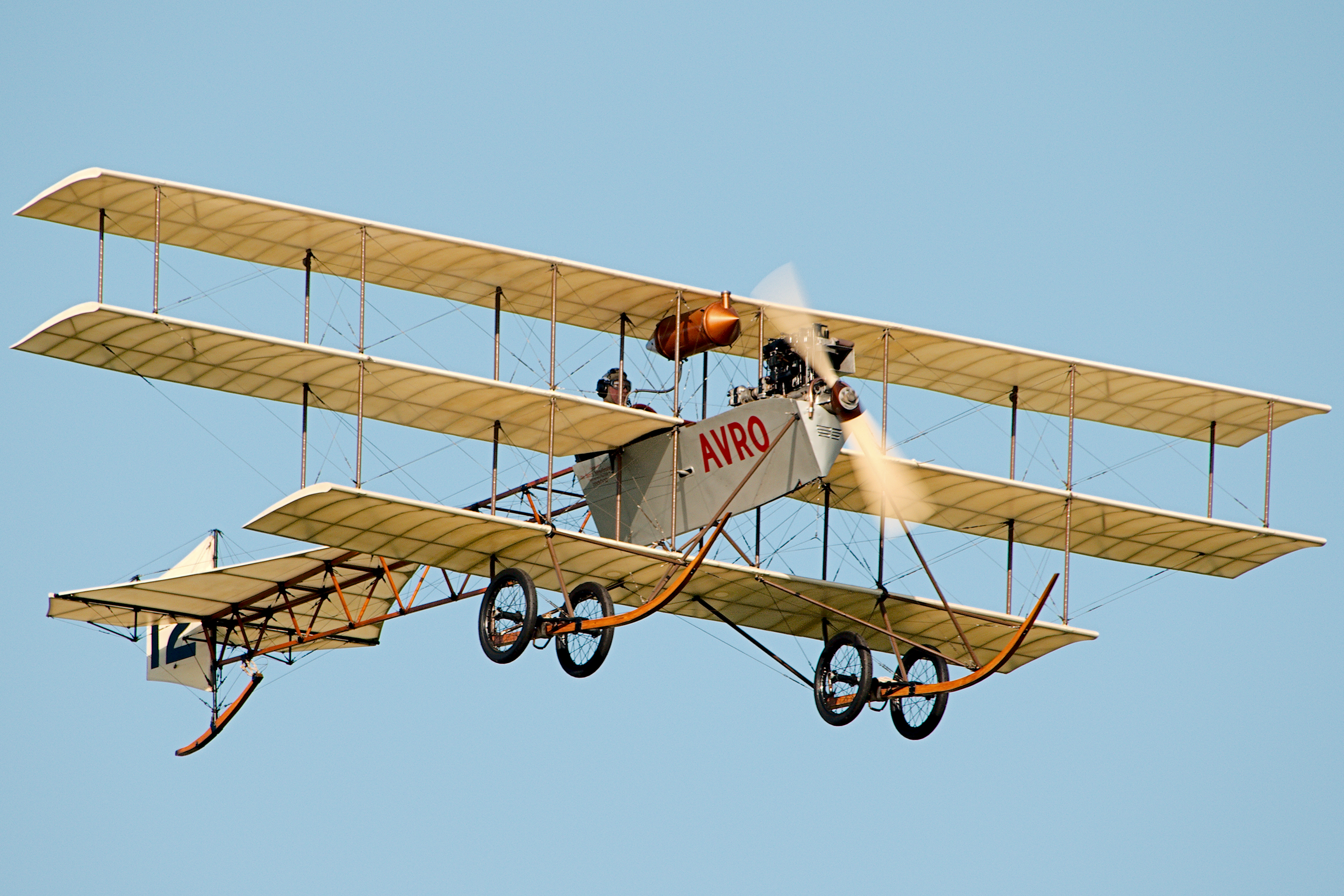
A replica Roe IV Triplane, G-ARSG of the Shuttleworth Collection. The original was a regular visitor to the sewage farm.

There was a sewage farm at the side of the landing area which the local council refused to remove without a large payment from the Brooklands owners, which they could not afford. Pilots often landed, overran, or crashed into it, leading to a distasteful procedure of extracting aircraft, pilot and sometimes passenger from the area. (Note: Crashes were common, often the result of stalling. Pixton is quoted as saying “Crashes were not usually serious as machines were light and had large surfaces and small engines. A stall meant that we dropped from the sky with a fluttering movement, like a leaf falling from a tree, and at the most suffered nothing more than a shaking up, a few bruises, seldom broken bones, but errors of judgement, however, accounted for crashes galore”.) Pixton had many more incidents of this than the other pilots, and became known as the ‘’Tripe Hound’’ and ‘’Sewage Farm King’’ along with his regular nicknames which included Pick, Pixie and HP.

Despite this, Pixton gained his Royal Aero Club licence (No.50) on 24 January 1911 in the Roe IV Triplane, though his licence is dated 31 December 1910.

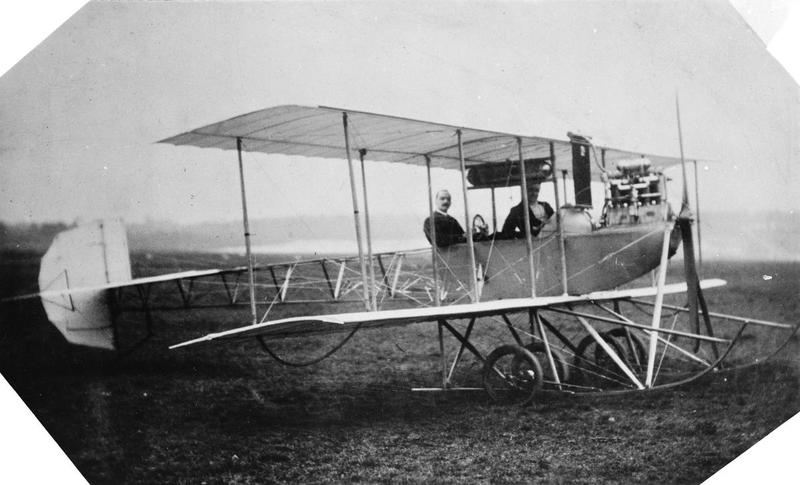
Avro Type D

On 1 April 1911 Pixton made the first flight of A.V. Roe’s first tractor biplane, the first time that A.V. himself hadn’t performed the maiden flight of one of his types. Despite its low power of 35 hp (26 kW) Pixton was delighted with it, and thought it was Roe’s first really successful design. It was dubbed ‘’The Pixie Plane’’, but would later be known as the Type D. Roe was very pleased with Pixton’s report, though he didn’t fly it himself, and Pixton soon took Roe’s wife up as a passenger, sitting in the front of the tandem seats.

Pixton took part in air races including taking the new biplane on the Brooklands to Brighton race, the first British point-to-point air race, held on 6 May 1911. Pixton started the race late, distracted by a flight for the Manville Prize, (Note: The Edward Manville Prize was awarded to the British pilot who flew the most hours with a passenger in flights of at least 15 minutes in an all-British aeroplane between 10 a.m. and 5.30 p.m. on nine set days from April to October 1911.) then got lost and had to land at what turned out to be Plumpton Racecourse to refuel, and arrived at the finish line well after the other three contestants.

Pixton was also involved in the first pilots’ strike in history. Mrs Hewlett was incensed that the management of Brooklands was only paying 5% of gross takings to the pilots at race meetings. She demanded 25%, and at the next event the pilots refused to fly for longer than the bare minimum needed to qualify for prizes, and kept their planes locked up in hangars for the rest of the day, unavailable for public inspection. Soon the management relented, the percentage and the prize money were increased and normality returned. The action was widely reported, and the publicity was good for all.

After all this, Pixton’s reputation had grown enormously, and he was now very well-known by the public as well as in the industry. Roe was only paying him £104 per year (equivalent to £10,590 in 2025) and couldn’t afford more, so Pixton contacted the Bristol company, who offered him £250 per year. He left Avro in early June 1911, parting on friendly terms with the Roe brothers, and very grateful for the opportunity they had given him.

== Bristol ==
The British and Colonial Aeroplane Company, Ltd., commonly known as Bristol, was a large, well-financed company run by businessman Sir George White, chairman of the Bristol Tramways Company. It was a great contrast to the small, enthusiast-run outfits that comprised most of his competitors. In 1910 they had set up flying schools at Brooklands and at Larkhill, near Stonehenge in Wiltshire, the latter leased from the War Office along with flying rights over 2,284 acres (924 hectares) of Salisbury Plain. Initially three iron sheds were erected.

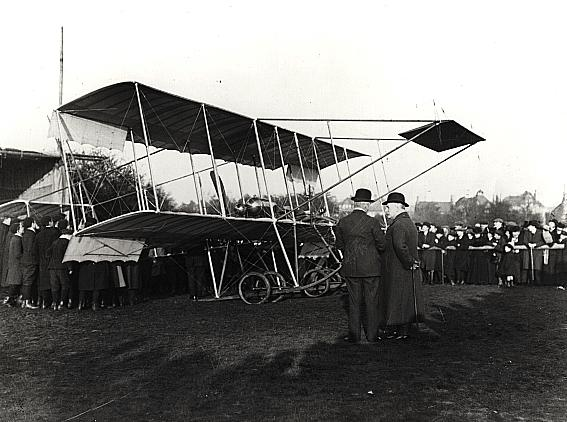
Sir George White stands in front of a Bristol Boxkite

Pixton started at Bristol’s Brookands school, instructing pupils flying their Boxkite (Farman-type) biplanes. He gained a great reputation for his skill in flying in high winds that left everyone else grounded Bristol used this in adverts even though he had only been with them for a few weeks.

Pixton was entered for “The Great Race” or “Daily Mail Circuit of Britain air race’’, an anti-clockwise tour of England and Scotland running from 22 July to 5 August 1911, starting and ending at Brooklands, and with a prize of £10,000, and prizes for several accomplishments en route, such as fastest to Newcastle and first to land at Trafford Park. Huge publicity and newspaper coverage attended the event, and crowds at the landing grounds were vast. Thirty pilots were registered, but only twenty-one actually started.

On the second racing day, the leg from Hendon to Harrogate, a fuel leak caused Pixton, flying his Boxkite named ‘’Bumble Bee’’, to attempt a forced landing at Spofforth cricket ground, four miles short of Harrogate. He stalled on the approach, narrowly missing the cricket pavilion, but crashed into the grass. Luckily his legs, though trapped, were not crushed, but a spar was pushed two inches into his thigh. He pulled it out, later needing two stitches. He also had a cut to his hand and a few bruises. It was his worst ever crash, and the aircraft was destroyed.

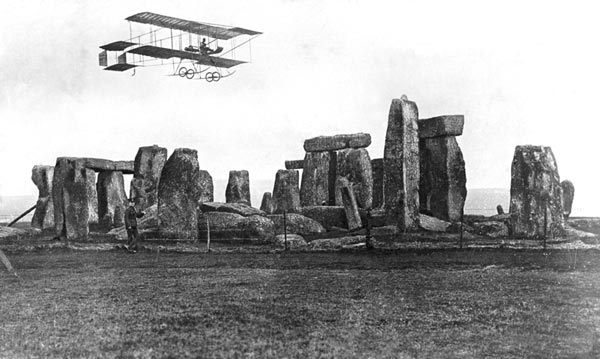
A Bristol Boxkite flying over Stonehenge on Salisbury Plain

Pixton carried on at Brooklands flying passengers, demonstrating and instructing, but on 31 August 1911 Bristol moved him to Larkhill as an instructor and test pilot. The training was of civilians and army pilots from the nearby army bases on Boxkites. Having made his career and many friends at Brooklands, he was very reluctant to go, but he found that he enjoyed the comparative peace and quiet of the area, and the flying conditions were favourable.

He was able to carry on competing for the Manville Prize (£500) for the most hours flying at Brooklands with passengers during the year. He flew there from Larkhill to compete. By the end of 1911 he had won the contest, bringing his prize money for the year to over £900 – more than anyone else flying in Britain. His achievement was celebrated by an advert in Aeroplane by the E.N.V. Motor Syndicate whose engine powered the Boxkites.

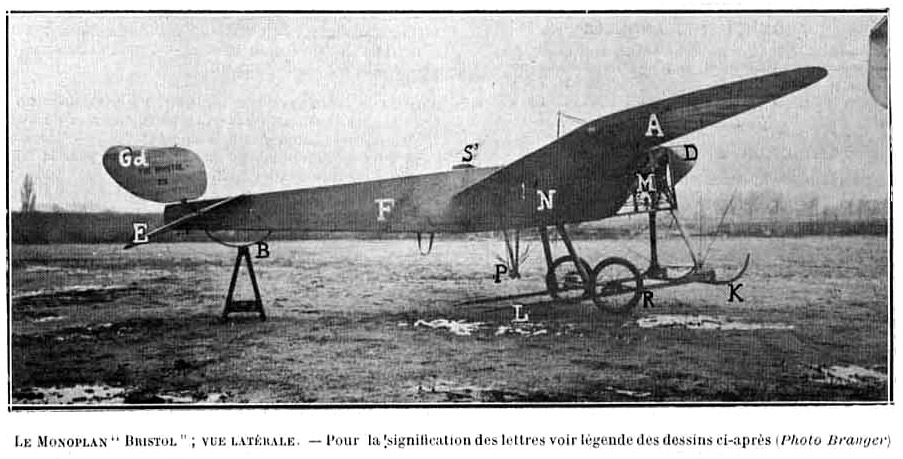
Bristol Prier monoplane

In 1912 Bristol started an overseas sales drive, and Pixton was the pilot chosen to make some of the trips. He started at the 3rd International Paris Aero Salon with the new Bristol Prier monoplane being the only British aircraft on display, with another Bristol Prier giving flying displays at the airfield.

The Bristol team then proceeded by train to Cuatro Vientos, Madrid where he flew a Bristol Prier, with another Bristol pilot flying a Boxkite, in front of the king, Alfonso XIII. Bristol arranged to set up a flying school and to equip it with Priers and Boxkites. By March they had travelled on to Döberitz Military Ground, Berlin, with a Prier. Impressing the German military, orders were placed and an agreement made to produce Bristol aircraft under licence.

In April 1912 Pixton was asked to test the Bristol-Burney X.2 hydroplane which had been built at Filton with great secrecy. In Milford Haven testing took place over three weeks, but with little success, and Pixton endured many drenchings in the process.

Soon after this Pixton returned to Germany, this time to visit the new Deutsche Bristol Werke company at Halberstadt, which was starting to produce the Boxkites and Prier aircraft under the licence agreed during his first visit. He was to form a flying school, and to teach six German officers, after which he returned to Larkhill.

Pixton took part in the Military Aircraft Trials at Larkhill in August 1912. Preparations were extensive and flying school activities were temporarily transferred to Brooklands. Thirty different aircraft types had been prepared to try to meet the War Office specifications, twenty of them actually arriving for the contest. Pixton started the trials flying a Bristol England biplane, but mid-way through the trials the Englands were withdrawn and he replaced James Valentine as pilot of a new Bristol Coanda monoplane for the remainder of the tests. Pixton and two others came joint 3rd, behind the winner, Cody, but no aircraft was deemed suitable for adoption by the military.

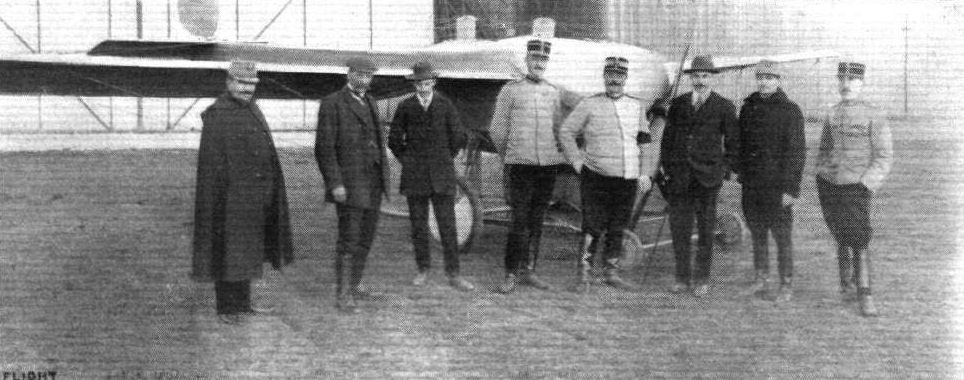
Pixton, third from the right, in front of the Bristol Coanda monoplane at the Bucharest military aerodrome

With the relative success of the Bristol Coanda, Romania was interested in the aircraft, so Pixton went there in October 1912 to demonstrate a tandem-seat version, accompanied by the designer, Henri Coandă, whose father was the war minister. Landing after one demonstration flight, Pixton ran into what he thought was a damp patch on Bucharest’s Cotroceni Aerodrome. The patch but was actually a pond and his aircraft overturned. He and his passenger survived unharmed and the aircraft was undamaged but moist and muddy, but was soon ready to fly again. He spent a month flying in Romania, and an order for ten was placed for the government.

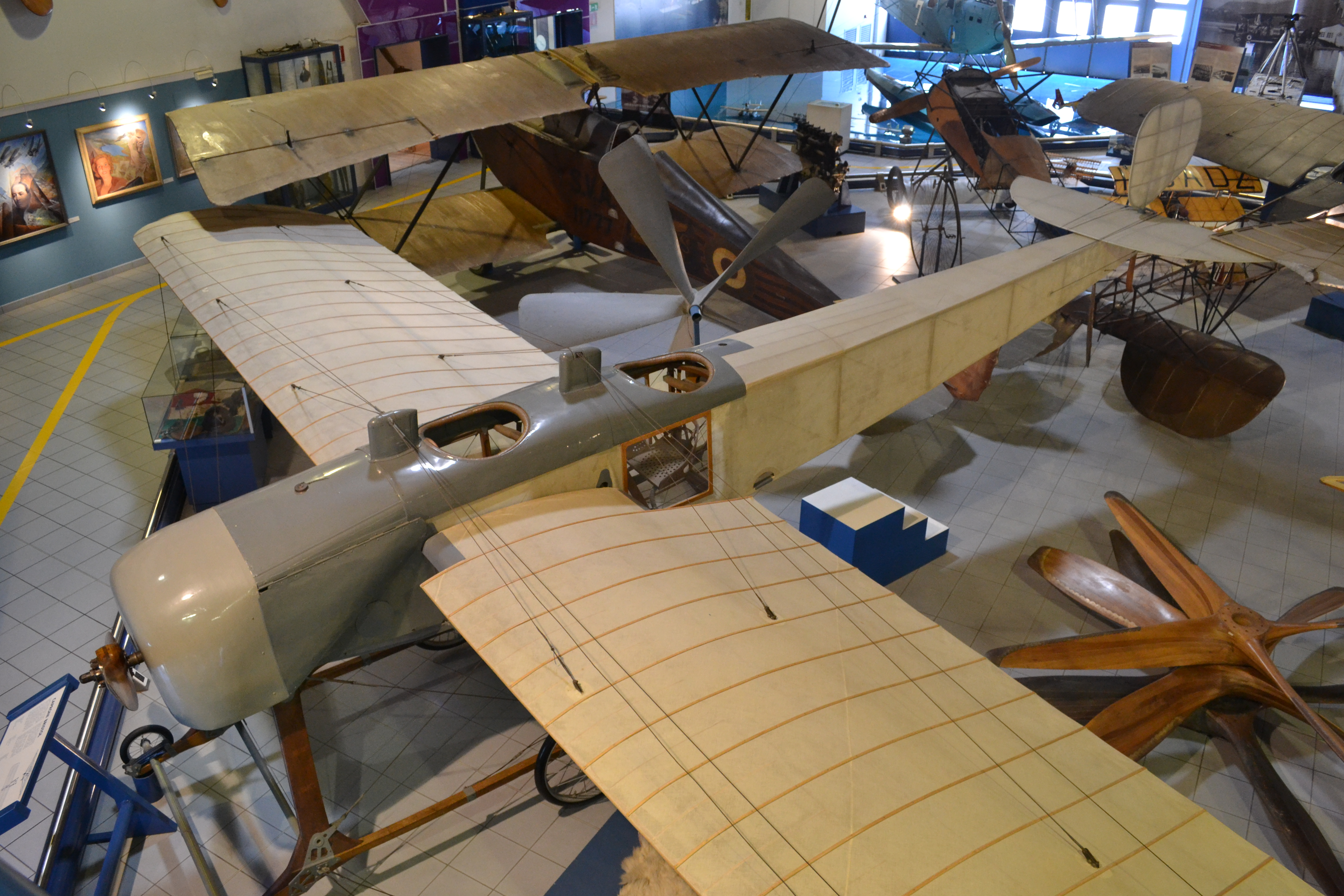
Caproni-built Bristol Coanda, the oldest surviving Bristol aircraft

Soon he went to Italy with a team of Bristol people and accompanied by his new wife (see Personal life below) where Pixton did a demonstration tour with Bristol aircraft, especially the Coanda, and the Italian government placed an order for a total of around 60 aircraft, some of which were to be built under licence by Caproni.

In January 1913 he made another trip to Spain to demonstrate the Bristol Coanda to King Alfonso, whom Pixton flew as a passenger. Again orders were placed for the aircraft.

Pixton and the rest of the Larkhill team had to move to Brooklands in October 1913 as the army wanted to take over the airfield for artillery ranges by March 1914.

Pixton found working for Bristol to be very agreeable. The company was generous, paying him £350 a year plus a third of prize money, and concerned for the well-being of its pilots. However in November 1913 he had an argument with Coandă about the balance of the new biplane he was going to fly, and refused to fly the aircraft until the problem was remedied. Coanda refused to make any changes, so Pixton resigned and joined the Sopwith Aviation Company.

== Sopwith ==
Thomas Octave Murdoch (Tom) Sopwith had started a flying school at Brooklands in 1912 but soon decided that with so many other schools based there, he would concentrate on aircraft design and production. He leased an old skating rink in Kingston-upon-Thames as his factory and design office, and used his buildings at Brooklands for assembling and flying the aircraft.

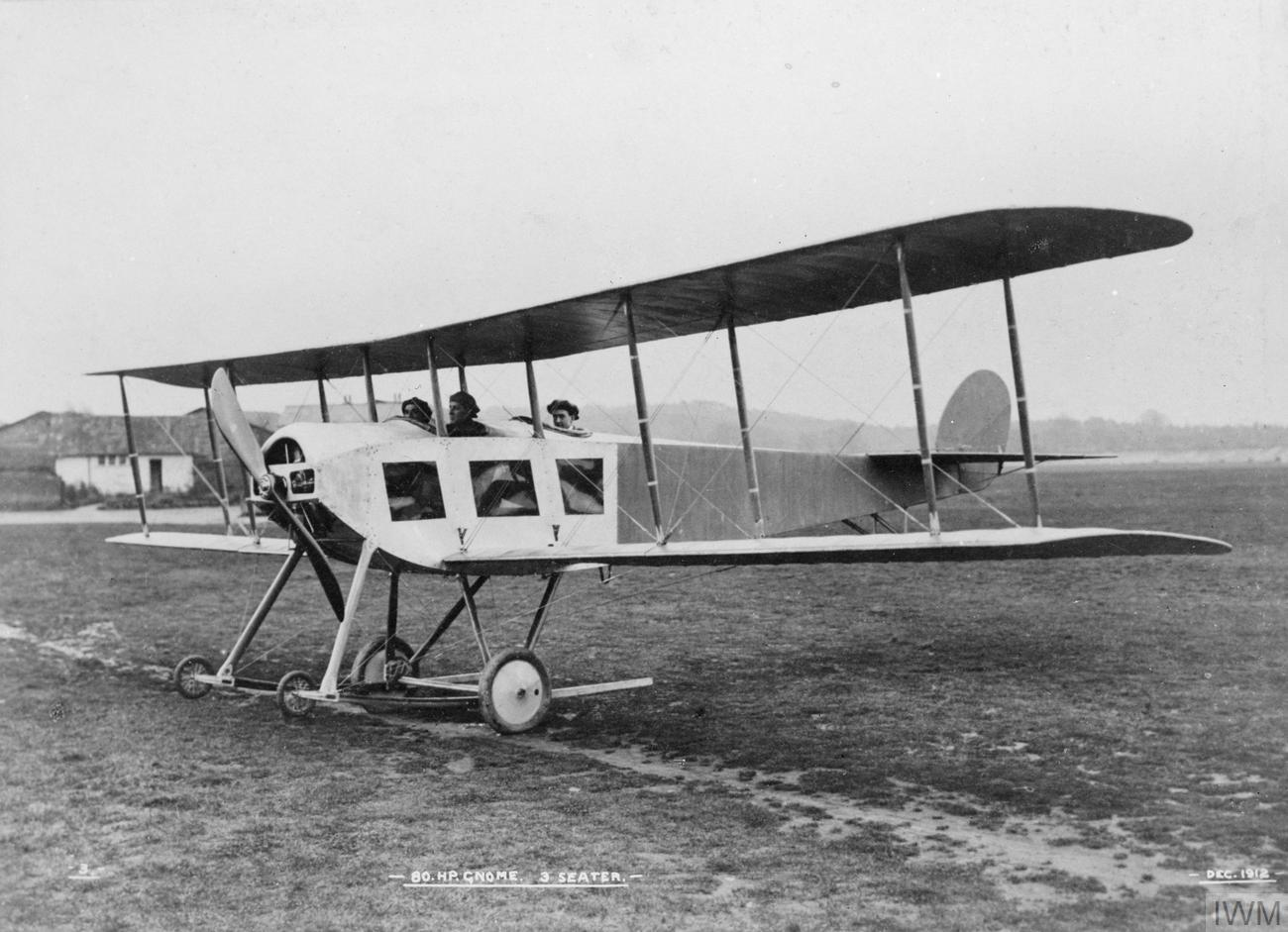
Sopwith Three-seater Tractor biplane

Pixton would be at Brooklands testing along with Harry Hawker, until then Sopwith’s only pilot. He would also be their race pilot. He would get a basic pay of £250 a year plus £5 for every aircraft he tested, and a share of prize money. He tested and delivered aircraft including the Batboat, Three-seater Tractor, Sociable and Tabloid biplane.

The Tabloid, officially named the Scout, was a very fast aircraft, and capable of looping, but Pixton had no desire to perform ‘stunts’. Testing Scouts for a military order was a major task. Taking part in races was another matter, and Sopwith entered Pixton in the Easter 1914 Brooklands Handicap race, where the Tabloid was rated as scratch. Thanks to the handicapping system he ended in 3rd place, just 30 seconds in front of a Bristol Boxkite.

=== 1914 Schneider Trophy Race ===
Sopwith decided at the very last moment to enter the Tabloid in the Schneider Trophy International Seaplane Race, the second of which was to be held at Monaco, where the first had been staged the previous year. The aircraft had its undercarriage exchanged for a central float, and the 80 hp (60 kW) Gnome Monosoupape engine replaced by a new 100 horsepower (75 kW) nine-cylinder version. On 1 April the machine was taken to the River Hamble but when Pixton applied power the float dug in, throwing Pixton into the water, wet but unharmed. They didn’t have a boat, and the aircraft drifted with the tide and could not be brought ashore until the early hours of the next morning. Returning to Kingston, the float was cut in half and refitted as twin floats to improve stability.

The next day they took the aircraft to the River Thames near Teddington Lock where it made a short flight to Eel Pie Island. The aircraft was immediately dispatched to Monaco, and Sopwith’s team set off to the Hotel Bristol in Monte Carlo. The whole conversion process had taken four days.

In Monaco the aircraft was tested the day before the race and an extra fuel tank was added in the cockpit to avoid the need to refuel during the event. Pixton made another test flight early on race day, 20 April, and, encouraged by the relatively low speed and poor technique of many of his competitors, started the race. About half-way through, a slight engine problem caused Pixton to climb slightly to give himself more time to glide into wind and land should the problem get worse, but it gave no further trouble and after a few laps he returned to a lower level. After the compulsory 28 10 kilometres (6.2 miles) laps of the course, taking about 2 hours, and knowing he was comfortably in the lead, he flew an extra two laps so that he would gain the 300 kilometres (190 miles) world seaplane speed record. His average speed had been 86.75 mph (139.61 km/h) and the maximum was 93 mph (150 km/h). No other seaplane had ever exceeded 80 mph (130 km/h), and he nearly doubled the speed of the previous year’s winner. One technique that he employed was to dramatically bank during turns, something that none of the others had done.

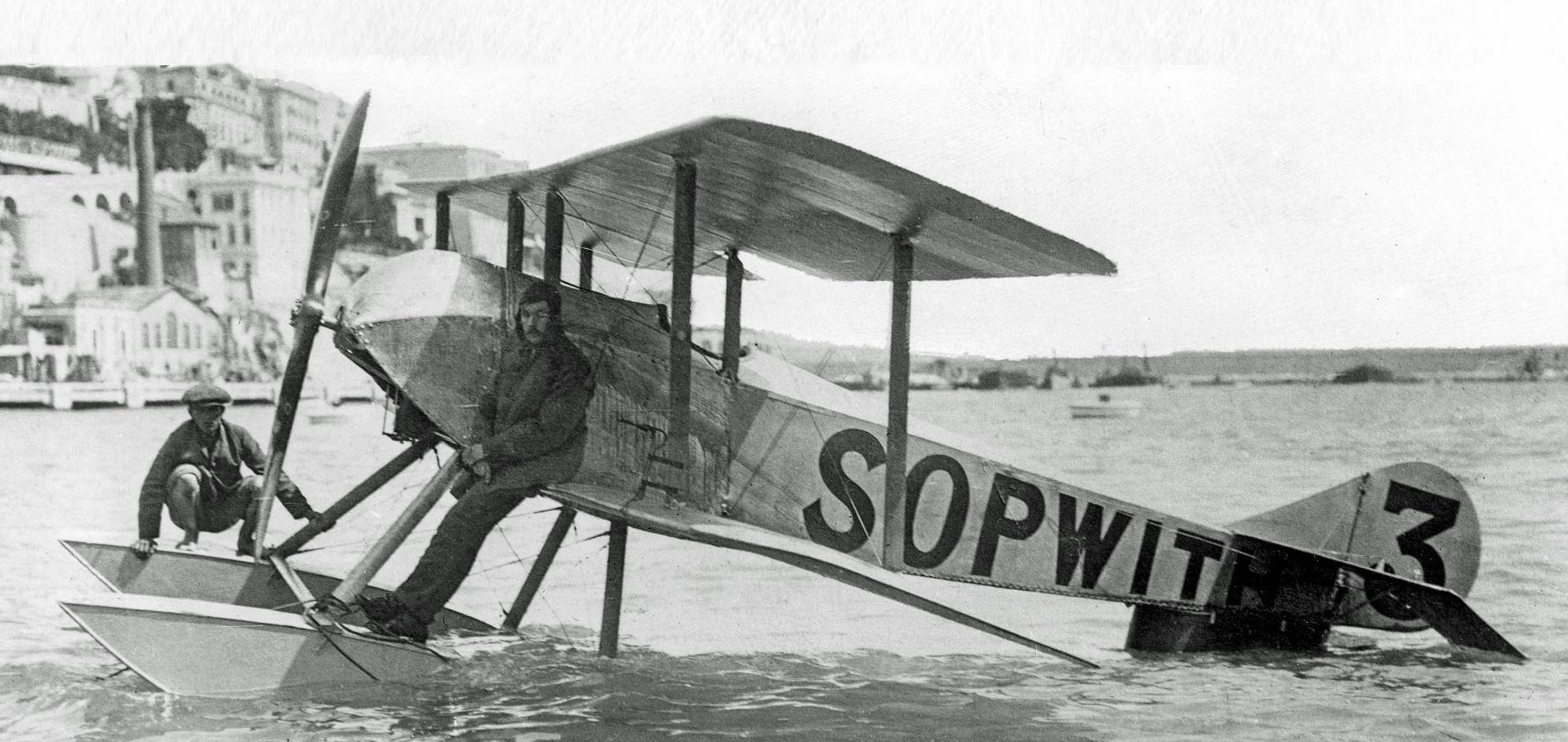
Pixton leaning against the wing while being towed in after the race with a mechanic providing balance

The remaining competitors either did not start, or failed to complete the course except for one Swiss pilot, Burri, in an FBA biplane powered by the same Gnome Monosoupape engine as the Tabloid. He had had to alight to refuel, and averaged 51mph. It was soon discovered that one cylinder of Pixton’s engine had failed due to a broken cam half-way through the flight.

Jacques Schneider invited Pixton to the Sporting Club after the event, and, amid the luxury of the hospitality in the land of wine and champagne, when asked what he would like to drink, bemused his host by replying "Thanks, mine's a half of Bass". (Note: A popular British beer)

After this success, Pixton became a little dissatisfied with his role, saying ”I think I will give up flying and go into something new, a business of my own perhaps. Flying’s for the young. Besides it’s getting too commercial".

However Pixton continued with his work for Sopwith, testing and delivering aircraft and competing in air races until, on 4 August 1914, war was declared and soon all non-military-related aviation had to stop, except within 3 miles of a recognised aerodrome.

== Aeronautical Inspection Department ==
At the end of September 1914, Pixton resigned from Sopwith and joined the Aeronautical Inspection Department (AID), a civilian organisation to supervise all aeronautical construction including the inspection of production facilities and the testing of prototypes and production aircraft. Pixton was appointed as an assistant inspector and test pilot at Farnborough. He found the work interesting and rewarding. On 1 April 1915 he joined the Royal Flying Corps (RFC) as a flying officer, 2nd lieutenant on probation He was promoted to the rank of temporary captain on 1 August 1915, being confirmed as a captain on 1 September 1917. He turned down requests from AV Roe and Tom Sopwith to return to work for them.

In 1917 Farnborough closed as a testing site, being replaced by Aircraft Acceptance Parks (AAP) which had been established around Britain. Pixton was posted to No 9 AAP which had been formed in August 1917 at Newcastle's Town Moor airfield. Types tested here included the Armstrong Whitworth F.K.8, Bristol F.2 Fighter and Sopwith Cuckoo which were manufactured locally. In May 1918 he went to Dublin, Ireland, as Inspector of Aerodromes and Landing Grounds with the task of finding new flying locations. In October 1918 he was transferred to the AID headquarters in London from which base he inspected and reported on aircraft factories. He was discharged from the RAF on 11 June 1919.

He had logged about 3,500 hours, flying at least 80 aircraft types until he left the RAF including:

- Avro Triplanes, Type D biplane, School Farman Boxkite, 504
- Bristol Boxkite, Tabateau biplane, England biplane, Prier monoplane, Coanda monoplane, Coanda biplane, Burney Hydro, Scout
- Sopwith pusher Hydro, tractor Hydro, Daily Mail Circuit Hydro, 3-seat and 2-seat Standard, Tabloid Scouts, Schneider Tabloid Floatplane, Bat Boats, Torpedo Hydro, Pup, Camel, 1 1/2 Strutter, Triplane
- Royal Aircraft Factory BE 2a, 2b, 2c, 2d, 2e, 12, FE 2b, 2d, 8, RE 5, 7, 8, SE 5
- de Havilland 4, 5, 9
- Blériot 2-seat and Parasol I-seat
- Caudron
- Henry Farman HF20
- Maurice Farman S7 Longhorn and SII Shorthorn
- Martinsyde G100 and G102 Elephant
- SPAD
- Armstrong Whitworth FK8
- Vickers Gun Bus, FB5 and FB 14T. (T-type tail)

== Later career ==
In August 1919 Pixton settled in Windermere, in the Lake District, where he rented a seaplane hangar at Cockshott, Bowness (Note: The hangar was rented from Edward William Wakefield who had previously used it in the development of his Avro-built Waterbird floatplane.) from which he flew two Avro 504L floatplanes (Note: These retained their RAF serials, H2581 and H2582, and were actually Avro 504K aircraft fitted with floats, unlike the L models which had a more powerful engine and a different strut arrangement for the floats.) for the newly-formed Avro Transport Company. He operated charter flights including flying Daily News newspapers to the Douglas Bay in the Isle of Man, on which he would also take fare-paying passengers for 10 guineas (£10.50). The first service was on 4 August, continuing until 3 September. He also did pleasure flights and flight training. Avro Transport Company withdrew in October 1919, (it ceased operations the following year) so Pixton carried on himself, as well as starting a car garage at the hangar and running a taxi and seasonal coach tours. He called the business The Lakes Motor and Seaplane Company, and he ran it for the next eight years.

After the death of his wife, he gave up the business and became the ground engineer for Liverpool & District Aero Club at Hooton Park on The Wirrall, Cheshire, over the winter of 1928-29. The club operated several Avro Avians. He then moved to Devon where he was the ground engineer at Haldon Aerodrome.

He retired to the Isle of Man in 1932, but during the Second World War worked again in the AID, retiring again in 1945.

== Personal life ==
Pixton married Maude E Hallam, daughter of the late Chief Constable of Salford, on 19 November 1912 at St Annes-on-Sea, Lancashire. Half of the honeymoon was spent at Brooklands, Larkhill and Hendon aerodromes, and half in Italy, accompanying him on the sales tour. Their son. Jack, was born in October 1913.

Maude died in October 1927 at the age of 40.

Pixton married again, to Winifred A Radford, in July 1931 at Newton Abbott, close to Haldon, Devon, where he was then working. Their daughter, Stella, was born during his retirement.

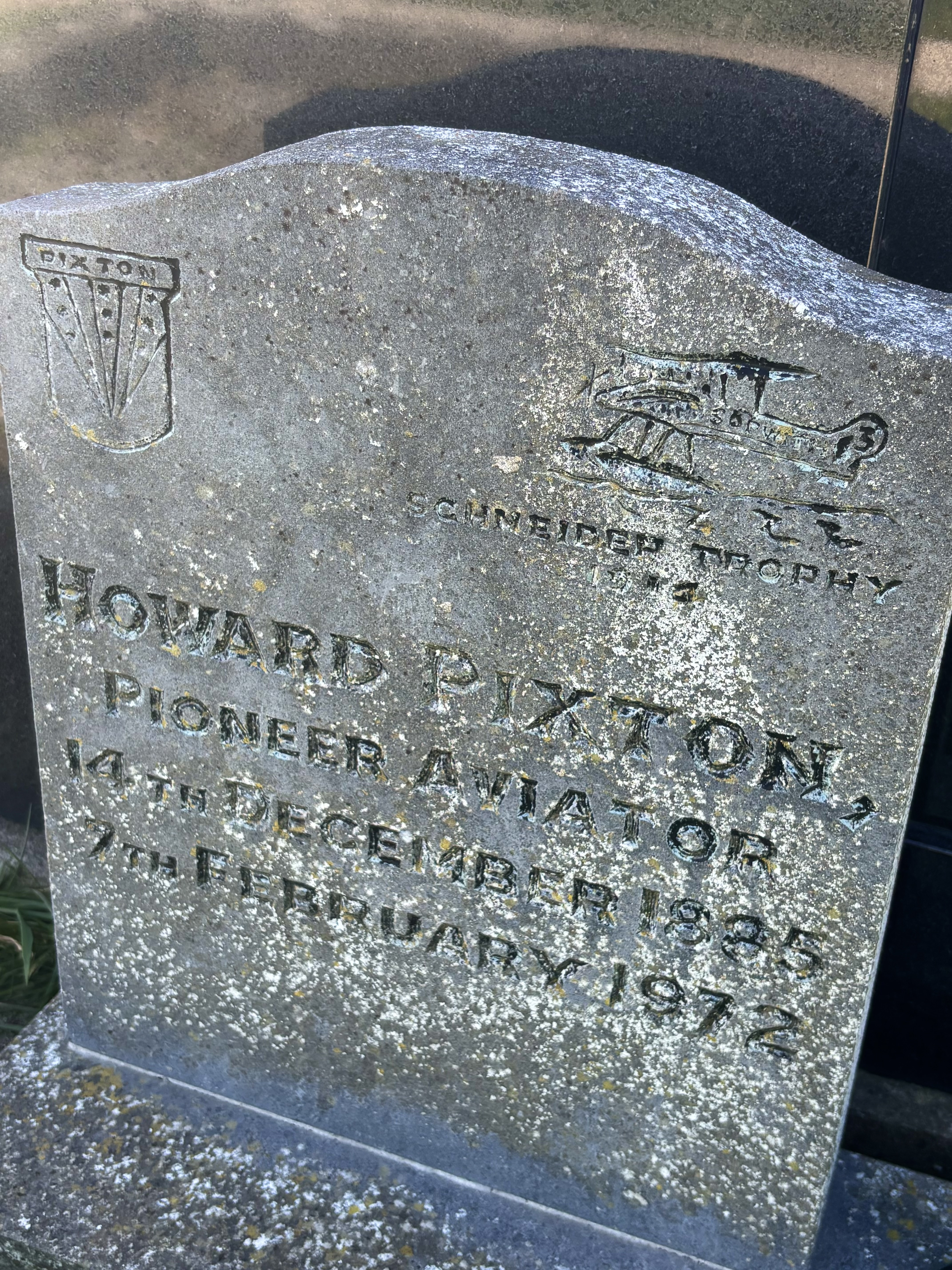
The grave of aviation pioneer Howard Pixton at Jurby Church on the Isle of Man

He died 7 February 1972 and is buried in the cemetery of St. Patrick's Church, Jurby, Isle of Man. In 2014 the Isle of Man Post Office issued a set of four stamps commemorating the centenary of Pixton's Schneider Cup victory.

== Bibliography ==
- Barnes, C. H. (1988). Bristol Aircraft since 1910 (3rd ed.). London: Putnam. ISBN 0-85177-823-2.
- Jackson, A. J. (1990). Avro Aircraft since 1908 (2nd ed.). London: Putnam Aeronautical Books. ISBN 0-85177-834-8.
- James, N. D. G. (1983). Gunners at Larkhill. Henley-on-Thames, UK: Gresham Books. ISBN 0-946095-08-6.
- Pixton, Stella (2014). Howard Pixton Test Pilot & Pioneer Aviator. Barnsley, UK: Pen & Sword Aviation. ISBN 978-1-47383-670-9.
- Robertson, Bruce (1970). Sopwith - the Man and his Aircraft. Letchworth, UK: Air Review Ltd. ISBN 0-900-435-15-1.
