= 1911 Circuit of Europe air race =

The Circuit of Europe (Circuit d'Europe) was an air race held in 1911. A prize of £8,000 was offered by Le Journal for the entire Circuit, with additional prizes for the individual stages. The stages of the race totalled 1,600 km (990 mi) were:

- Paris-Liège: 325 km (203 mi). Control at Reims. Prize £1600.
- Liège-Spa-Venlo: 120 km (75 mi). Control at Belle Fagne, near Malchamp. Prize £400.
- Venlo-Utrecht: 87 mi (140 km) Control at Verloo. Prize £1,200, and a prize of £400 for the first Dutch aviator to finish the stage.
- Utrecht-Brussels: Control at Breda. Prizes £1,600 (£1,000 for the time from Paris to Brussels, and £600 for the Utrecht-Brussels leg).
- Brussels-Roubaix 80 km (50 mi): Prize £600
- Roubaix-Calais: Prize £400
- Calais-London (Hendon Aerodrome): Controls at Dover and Shoreham. Prizes: £2,500 offered by the Standard for the overall time between Paris and London, and £400 offered by Shoreham for daily stage.
- London-Calais: Prize £400.
- Calais-Paris: Prize £800 in addition to the £8,000 for the whole Circuit.

== Paris-Liège ==
The first stage was held on 18 June. Most of the competitors started from the military parade ground at Vincennes, watched by around 500,000 spectators. A few who were members of the French army took off from Issy-les-Moulineaux. In all, 43 pilots started the race. The event was marred by three fatal accidents: Léon Lemartin crashed on take-off from Vincenness and died on arrival at hospital, Lt. Pierre Princeteau crashed at Issy while attempting to land to repair a fault, his aircraft overturning and catching fire, and Pierre Landron was killed when his aircraft caught fire near Chateaux-Thierry. René Vidart, flying a Deperdussin monoplane, was the first to arrive at Liège; his time for the course was 3 h 9 m 54 s. Jules Védrines, flying a Morane came second and Charles Weymann, flying a Nieuport, third. Only eighteen pilots managed to complete the course within the allowed time.

== Liège-Spa-Venlo ==
The second stage was to have been held on 20 June but poor weather forced a postponement to the next day. The stage was won by Jules Védrines, René Vidart coming second and Jean Louis Conneau, flying as André Beaumont in a Blériot third.

== Venlo-Utrecht ==
19 pilots started the third stage, of whom 14 finished. The stage was won by Gilbert with a time of 2 h 4 min 25 s. Roland Garros was second (2 h 10 min 21 s) and Vidart third (2 h 17 min 20 s).

== Utrecht-Brussels ==
The fourth stage was to have started on 24 June. However, although the organisers decided that weather conditions were suitable the pilots disagreed, and hauled down the white flag that had been hoisted as the signal that flying would take place. It was immediately rehoisted but the pilots refused to fly, saying that they would reconsider their position later. Weather conditions did not improve, and the start was postponed. The weather did not clear until 26 June.

== Brussels-Roubaix ==
Nine pilots started the stage on 28 June, Weyman having withdrawn from the race in order to take part in the Gordon Bennett Trophy race. Védrines won with a time of 58 min, Kimmerlin was second (1 h 11 min) and Garros third. (1 h 15 min)

== Roubaix-Calais ==
After a delayed start due to fog at Calais, the stage was won by Védrines in 1 h 16 min, Vidart coming second (1 h 32 min) and "Beaumont" third (1 h 44 min): only three other competitors completed the stage that day.

== Calais-London ==
The delayed start of the previous stage caused a postponement until Monday 3 July to avoid interfering with the Gordon Bennett race being held at Eastchurch that weekend. The fastest pilot over the first leg was Gilbert, winning a £100 prize with a time of 37 min 57 s. Beaumont won the Standard prize for the best overall time between Paris and London, and Védrines won the prize for the stage with a time of 2 h 56 min. Vidart was second (3 h 27 min) and Beaumont third (3 h 32 min).

== London-Calais ==
Held over two days, the section from Hendon to Dover being made on 6 July. The cross-channel flight from Dover to Calais was held the following day. Ten competitors set off from Hendon: the only one to fail to reach Dover was James Valentine, the only British competitor in the race. The next day the first of the nine contestants still in the competition taking off at 4.30 am and followed at three-minute intervals by all but one of the others who was slightly delayed by engine trouble. All made the crossing safely.

== Calais-Paris ==
Held on 7 July. Lt. Jean Louis Conneau (flying as André Beaumont) completed the circuit with a total flying time of 58 h 36 s, Garros was second (62 h 18 min) and Vidart third (73 h 32 min). The stage was won by Vidart (2 h 33 min 6 s), with Gilbert second (2 h 36 min 40 s) and Garros third (3 h 13 min 49 s). In all nine competitors finished the race.
