= Verloo =

Verloo is a surname. Notable people with the surname include:

- Courtney Verloo (born 1991), American soccer player
- Mieke Verloo (born 1950), Dutch political scientist
