= Bristol Prier monoplane =

Prier monoplane
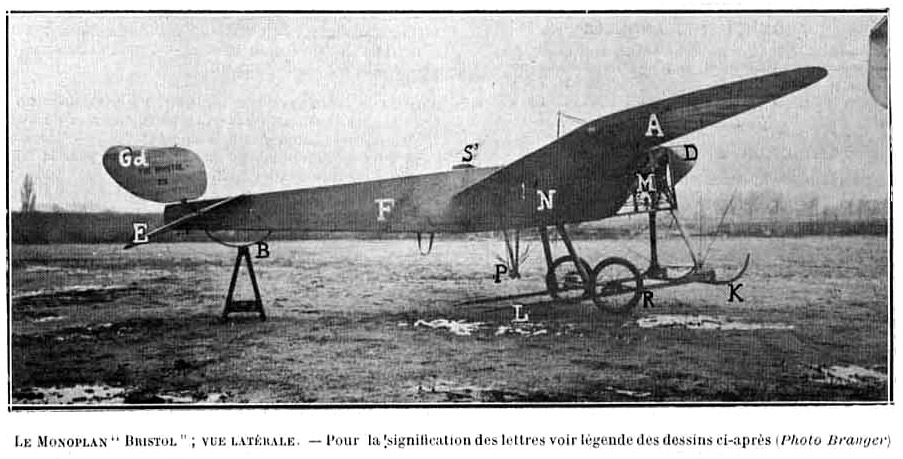

General information
- Manufacturer: Bristol Aeroplane Company
- Designer: Pierre Prier
- Number built: 34

History
- First flight: 1911

The Bristol Prier monoplane was an early British aircraft produced in a number of single- and two-seat versions.

== Background ==
The Bristol Prier Monoplanes were a series of tractor configuration monoplanes designed for the Bristol and Colonial Aeroplane Company by Pierre Prier, the former chief pilot of the Bleriot school at Hendon, who had joined Bristol in July 1911. At this time Bristol lacked a designer, George Challenger and Archibald Low having left the company to work for Vickers's newly established aircraft division.

== Design and development ==
Unsurprisingly, the Bristol Prier monoplanes resembled the successful Blériot XI monoplane, with a fabric-covered wire-braced wood fuselage and parallel-chord wings using wing-warping for lateral control, although differing in details. The all-moving tailplane was an elongated fan-shape, mounted in a mid-position between the upper and lower longerons, and the undercarriage had a pair of wheels on an axle mounted onto a pair of forward-projecting skids. It was powered by a 50 hp (37 kW) Gnome rotary engine. The first aircraft built (works No. 46) had been intended to compete in the Gordon Bennett Trophy race, but it was not ready in time. Two more aircraft, nos. 56 and 57, with a revised engine mounting, were started with the intention of taking place in the Daily Mail Circuit of Britain race.

Work was then started on developing a two-seater version, this being works number 58. By October 1911 it had been thoroughly tested, and the directors of Bristol decided the type was suitable for volume production. Six airframes were started (Nos 71–76), the first of which was carefully prepared, with the aluminium cowling polished, a pigskin-upholstered seat and stowage for binoculars and a thermos flask, for exhibition at the 1911 Paris Aero Salon where it was the only British aircraft on display. At the same time two of the prototype aircraft (Nos. 46 and 57) were adapted to take a 35 hp (26 kW) Anzani engine, with the intention of developing a low-powered sports aircraft. It was joined in Paris by No. 74, where it was used to make demonstration flights over Paris during the Aero Salon.

No. 72 was sent to Madrid for demonstration flights piloted by Howard Pixton, and when these were completed Pixton was sent to Germany, where he flew No. 74 at Döberitz to demonstrate its capabilities to the German army. As a result of this Bristol started a German subsidiary, the Deutsche Bristolwerke Flugzeuggesellschaft m.b.H. (Renamed Halberstädter Flugzeugwerke in 1913), and an associated flying school at Halberstadt, No. 74 being allocated to the school.

The Prier monoplanes were used mostly for training and racing, and some were purchased for military use. Two of the two-seaters were sold and delivered to the Turkish Government. One of the two-seaters was sold to the Bulgarian government and delivered on 16 September 1912. It flew during the Balkan War and once carried Hubert Wilkins who was taking films for a London newspaper.

== Variants ==
- P-1: Prototype aircraft. Works nos. 46, 56,57
- Single-seat "School".40 hp (30 kW) Clement-Bayard or 40 hp (30 kW) Isaacson
- Two-seat short body. Wingspan 32 ft 9 in. (9.95 m). Powered by 50 hp (37 kW) Gnome. Works nos.68, 81, 95–8, 102
- Two-seat long body. Wingspan 34 ft (10 m), length 26 ft (7.9 m). Powered by 70 hp (52 kW) Gnome. Works nos. 82, 85–89, 91, 130, 155, 156.
- Two-seat side-by-side. Wingspan 34 ft 6 in (10.48 m), length 26 ft (7.9 m). Powered by 75 hp (56 kW) Gnome. Works nos. 107–109

== Operators ==
Bulgaria

- Bulgarian Air Force

Turkey

- Ottoman Air Force

United Kingdom

- Royal Flying Corps
  - 3 Squadron in 1912

== Specifications (P-1) ==
General characteristics

- Crew: one pilot
- Length: 24 ft 6 in (7.47 m)
- Wingspan: 30 ft 2 in (9.2 m)
- Height: 9 ft 9 in (2.97 m)
- Wing area: 166 sq ft (15.4 m^{2})
- Empty weight: 640 lb (290 kg)
- Gross weight: 820 lb (372 kg)
- Powerplant: 1 × Gnome rotary engine , 50 hp (37 kW)

Performance

- Maximum speed: 68 mph (109 km/h, 59 kn)
