= Jean Louis Conneau =

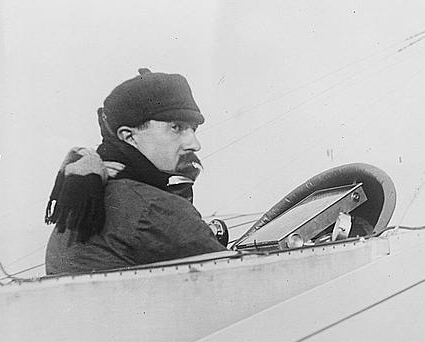
- Jean Louis Conneau aka André Beaumont
- Born: 8 February 1880; Lodève, Hérault
- Died: 5 August 1937 (aged 57); Lodève, France
- Other names: André Beaumont
- Occupations: Naval officer, Aircraft pilot, Company director, Flying boat manufacturer
- Known for: winning Air races - 1911 'Paris-Rome'; 'Circuit d'Europe'; Circuit of Britain Race

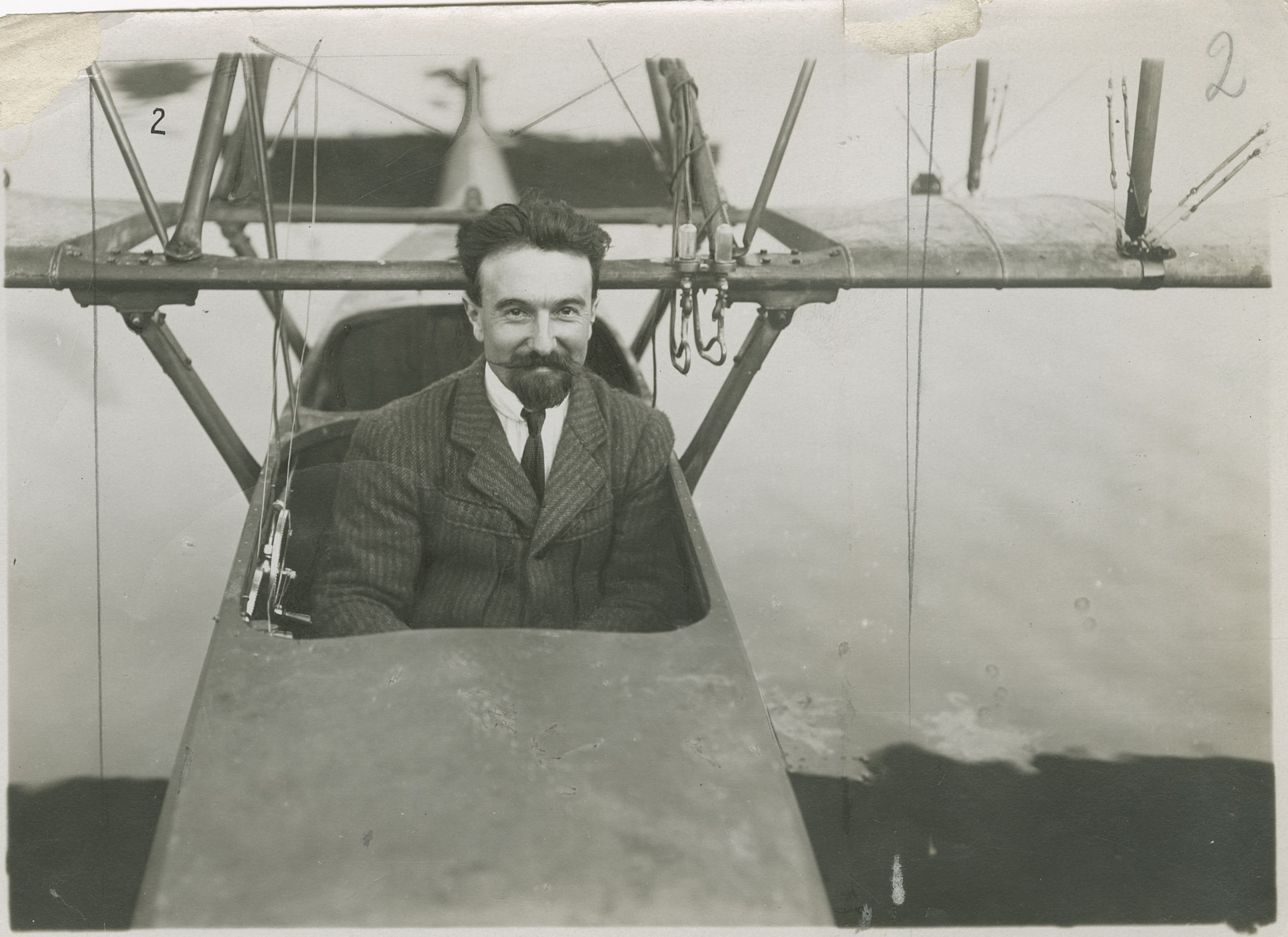
André Beaumont in 1910

Jean Louis Conneau (8 February 1880 Lodève, Hérault, France – 5 August 1937, Lodève), better known by the pseudonym André Beaumont, was a pioneer French aviator, French Navy lieutenant, and flying boat manufacturer.

== Flying career ==
Conneau used the pseudonym "Beaumont" because, as a serving member of the French armed forces, he was not permitted to use his own name. He earned his French pilot's license, No. 322, on 7 December 1910, and his military pilot's license, No. 4, on 18 December 1911.

=== Air races ===
In 1911 he won three of the toughest aeronautical tests: the 'Paris-Rome' race, the first Circuit d'Europe (Tour of Europe) (Paris-Liege-Spa-Utrecht-Brussels-Calais-London-Calais-Paris) on 7 July 1911, and the Daily Mail Circuit of Britain Race (England and Scotland) on 26 July 1911, flying a Blériot XI. He also participated in the ill-fated 1911 Paris to Madrid air race in May 1911.

In June 1911, during the Paris-Liege leg of the Circuit d'Europe, his support engineer and teammate Léon Lemartin was involved in a fatal accident on take-off.

=== Aircraft manufacture ===
In 1912 he became the technical director of Donnet-Lévèque, which manufactured flying boats. In 1913 he co-founded Franco-British Aviation (FBA) to build flying boats (French hydravions). It had its headquarters in London and a factory in Paris and supplied both the French and British armed services.

As a flying boat pilot, he commanded squadrons at Nice, Bizerte, Dunkirk, and Venice during World War I (1914–1918). He worked at Franco-British Aviation perfecting flying boats for the French Navy from 1915 until 1919.

== Publications ==
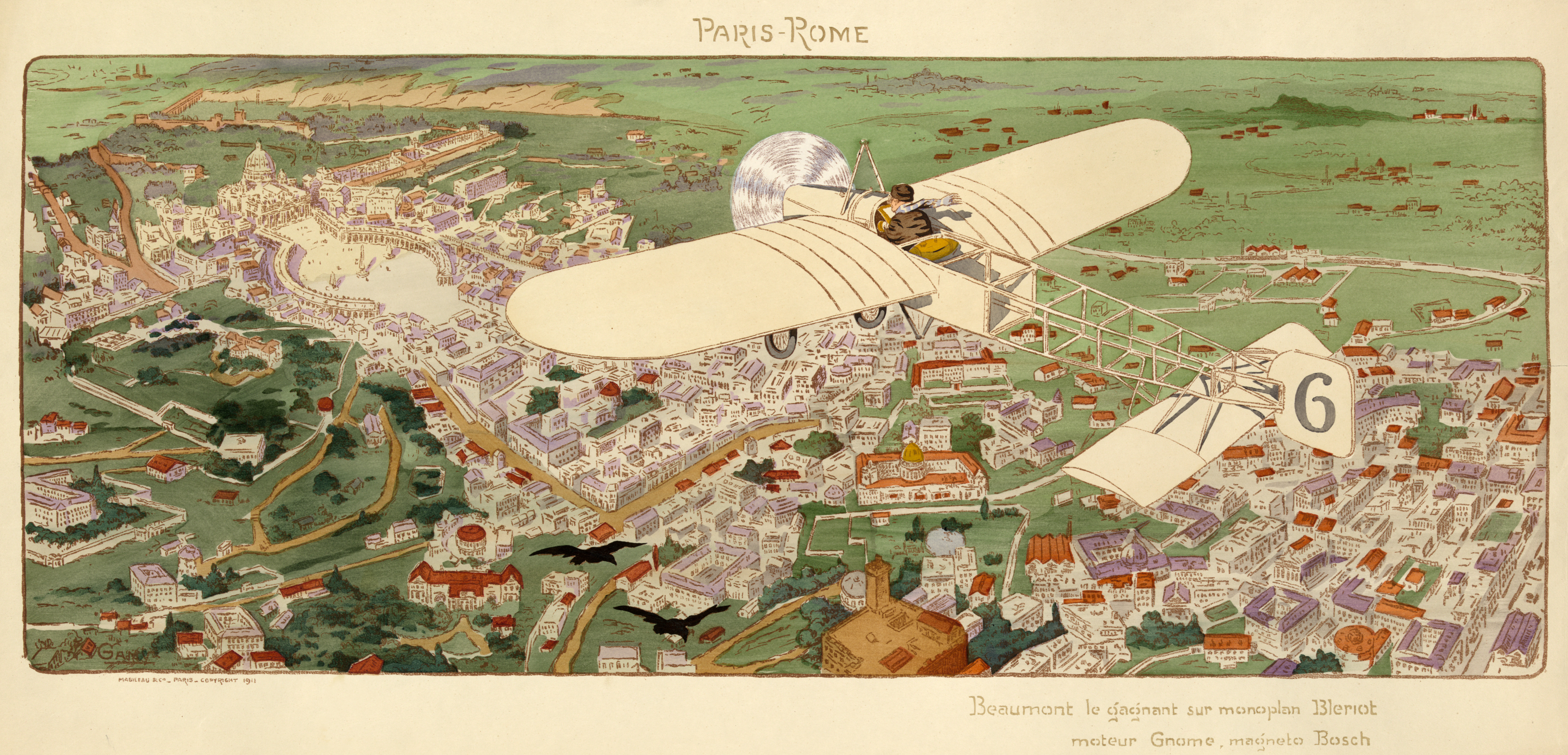
Contemporary illustration of Conneau's victory in the Paris-Rome race

- Mes trois grandes courses, (My three major races) Hachette, Paris, 1912.
