= Graham Gilmour =

British pioneer aviator (1885-1912)

- Born: Douglas Graham Gilmour; 5 March 1885; Dartford, Kent, England
- Died: 17 February 1912 (aged 26); Richmond, Surrey, England
- Cause of death: Aircraft accident
- Resting place: Mickleham, Surrey
- Education: Clifton College
- Aviation career
- First flight: Antoinette
- Flight license: 19 May 1910; Pau

Graham Gilmour (5 March 1885 – 17 February 1912) was a British pioneer aviator, known for his impromptu public displays of flying. He was killed on 17 February 1912 when his Martin-Handasyde monoplane suffered a structural failure and crashed in the Old Deer Park in Richmond, London.

== Early life ==
Gilmore was born at Blackheath in Kent on 5 March 1885, the son of David Gilmour of Shanghai and Margaret Jane (née Muirhead), and educated at Clifton College as an Engineer.

He started his practical engineering training at Allens of Bedford from 1905 to 1907 and then to the Adams Motor Company where he specialised in internal combustion engines.

== Aviation career ==
Gilmour went to the Rheims aviation meeting in August 1909 and bought himself a Blériot aircraft; he next had to learn to fly it. Gilmour learnt to fly in France, first at the Antoinette school at Pau school and later at the Blériot school, and was awarded French flying license No.75 on 19 May 1910.

His Blériot did not fare so well: it was delivered from Paris to Pau but was damaged on the railway journey. It was repaired by Blériot and test flown by Alfred Leblanc but the next day its hangar blew down, and it was not until 9 March 1910 that Gilmour sat in his own aircraft. It had only taken Gilmour seven flights to gain his French certificate, with only one accident. Gilmour was the owner of 29 motor cycles and with his engineering training it was not hard for him to handle the Anzani engine fitted to the Blériot.

On returning to England he based himself at Brooklands and quickly established a reputation as an able pilot, flying an Anzani-engined Blériot XI monoplane which he named Big Bat at the aviation meetings at Lanark and Wolverhampton. On 30 Sep he made a flight setting a record for flights at Brooklands, staying in the air for over an hour. At the end of 1910 he was supplied with a Bristol Boxkite by the Bristol Aeroplane Company which he fitted with a loaned E.N.V. engine to make an attempt at winning the Michelin Cup, but the attempt came to nothing owing to a cylinder head blowing off.

This was the beginning of an association with Bristol, with Gilmour at first working at their flying schools at Larkhill and Brooklands, and also gaining publicity by his exploits. On 1 April, flying a Boxkite, he was one of six pilots to overfly the Boat Race, circling above Hammersmith Bridge and thrilling the assembled crowd by several times turning his engine off and gliding (at the time considered a daring manoeuvre), until the competing crews passed under him: he then accompanied them to the finish at Mortlake. He afterwards ran out of petrol and had to land on the Chiswick Polytechnic cricket field. A passing motorist supplied him with some petrol, and after instruction from Gilmour a man from the crowd which had gathered started the engine, while others hung on to the aircraft until the engine was run up to speed. On 6 May he took part in a well-publicised race from Brooklands to Shoreham, afterwards bombing the submarine depot in Portsmouth with oranges.

Gilmour was to have flown a Bristol in the Gordon Bennett Trophy competition at Eastchurch, but his racing aircraft was not ready for the start: instead Gilmour made some exhibition flights in a Bristol biplane. He was also prevented from competing in the 1912 Circuit of Britain race, in which he was to have flown a Bristol Type T. On 5 July Gilmour had made a flight over central London, and was reported to have circled the dome of St Paul's Cathedral before following the course of the Thames as far as Westminster Bridge, causing members of parliament to crowd the terrace of the Houses of Parliament to witness his flight. Two days later had made an appearance at the Henley Regatta, flying over the river at an altitude of between 400 and 500 ft (120 and 150 m), before flying down and briefly skimming the water with the aircraft's wheels. On 18 July the Royal Aero Club suspended his pilot's license for a month for reckless flying. Although complaints had been made about his alleged circling of St Paul's the Aero Club committee believed Gilmour's assertion that he had held to the course of the river, but nevertheless banned him for the flight at Henley, despite Gilmour's defence:

The only thing that could have happened would have been for the machine to have stopped through fouling the water; in that case I should have got a ducking, to the amusement of the public and the great discomfort of myself, but without any danger to anybody. And taking into consideration the other parts of the performance, when I was flying at a height of 400 ft to 500 ft there was absolutely no danger to the public on the river as I did not pass over their heads too low down but only over the course.

Gilmour marked the ban by placing a black crêpe bound mourning wreath above his hangar. The suspension prevented Gilmour from taking part in competitions which were under the control of the Aero Club, but did not prevent him from flying: he is reported as having flown a Martin Handasyde on 23 July.

Another crowd-pleasing flight occurred when, after testing a re-built Bristol biplane at Filton, he gave the Bristol workers a display of "some very clever trick flying":

First diving sharply to the ground he then rose again at a steep angle, after which he banked the machine very considerably in some sharp turns. A long switchback flight followed, and Mr. Gilmour concluded his fine performance by coming down at a very sharp angle, bringing his machine to rest exactly opposite the door of the shop where it was to spend the night. During the flight Mr. Gilmour took his hands from the controls, and waved a salute to the crowd beneath, afterwards travelling for some distance with his arms folded.

He continued to fly for Bristol instructing and making trial flights and late in 1911 began making trial flights for Martin-Handasyde.

Although sometimes described as a reckless dare-devil by the popular press, this was not the opinion held of him by the aviation community, who thought him one of England's finest flyers: daring, but not one to indulge in dangerous tricks without appreciating the risk involved, and having a reputation for always carefully inspecting any aircraft before flying it.

In 1911 he was charged with manslaughter after he ran down a 10-year-old boy at Wylye, Wiltshire while he was driving a motor-car, Gilmour was overtaking a cart when the boy ran out into the road. At the trial in May 1911 at Salisbury Crown Court he was found not guilty of the charge.

== Death ==
Gilmour had set off from Brooklands at about 11 a.m. to make a trial cross-country flight in a Martin Handasyde monoplane. While flying over the Old Deer Park in Richmond at about 400 ft (120 m) the aircraft suffered a structural failure and crashed, killing Gilmour instantly. Eyewitnesses reported that the left wing of the aircraft had folded in mid-air, although an examination of the wreckage revealed that all the bracing wires were intact. The accident was possibly due to Gilmour encountering an air pocket: other aviators had encountered such conditions that day.

An inquest into the death was held at Richmond on 20 February 1912, the coroner and jury first inspected the wreck in the Old Deer Park and had the assistance of the manufacturer Martin & Handyside, an aeronautical engineer and Tom Sopwith who had flown the aircraft previously. Witnesses talked about the state of health of Gilmour and the condition of the machine, a letter from Gilmour with his wishes for funeral was presented to the inquiry. The coroner said the inquiry had to decide if it was a pure accident or a "weak spot" in the aircraft, the jury after consideration returned a verdict of accidental death, they thought that something had happened to the aircraft but they did not have enough evidence to show what.

His funeral at Mickleham near Dorking, Surrey featured a motor lorry driven by the aviator James Radley instead of a hearse, the flat bed draped in purple cloth: the grave was lined with pink azaleas, coloured flowers only were requested and no bells were tolled. The letter Gilmour had left outlining his wishes for his funeral ended "I want every one to be merry and bright, for I don't believe in moaning" He was buried at St. Michael's Churchyard, Mickleham with his parents David (1842–1907) and Margaret (1849–1910).
