= Gordon Bennett Trophy (aeroplanes) =

International airplane racing trophy

The Gordon Bennett Aviation Trophy
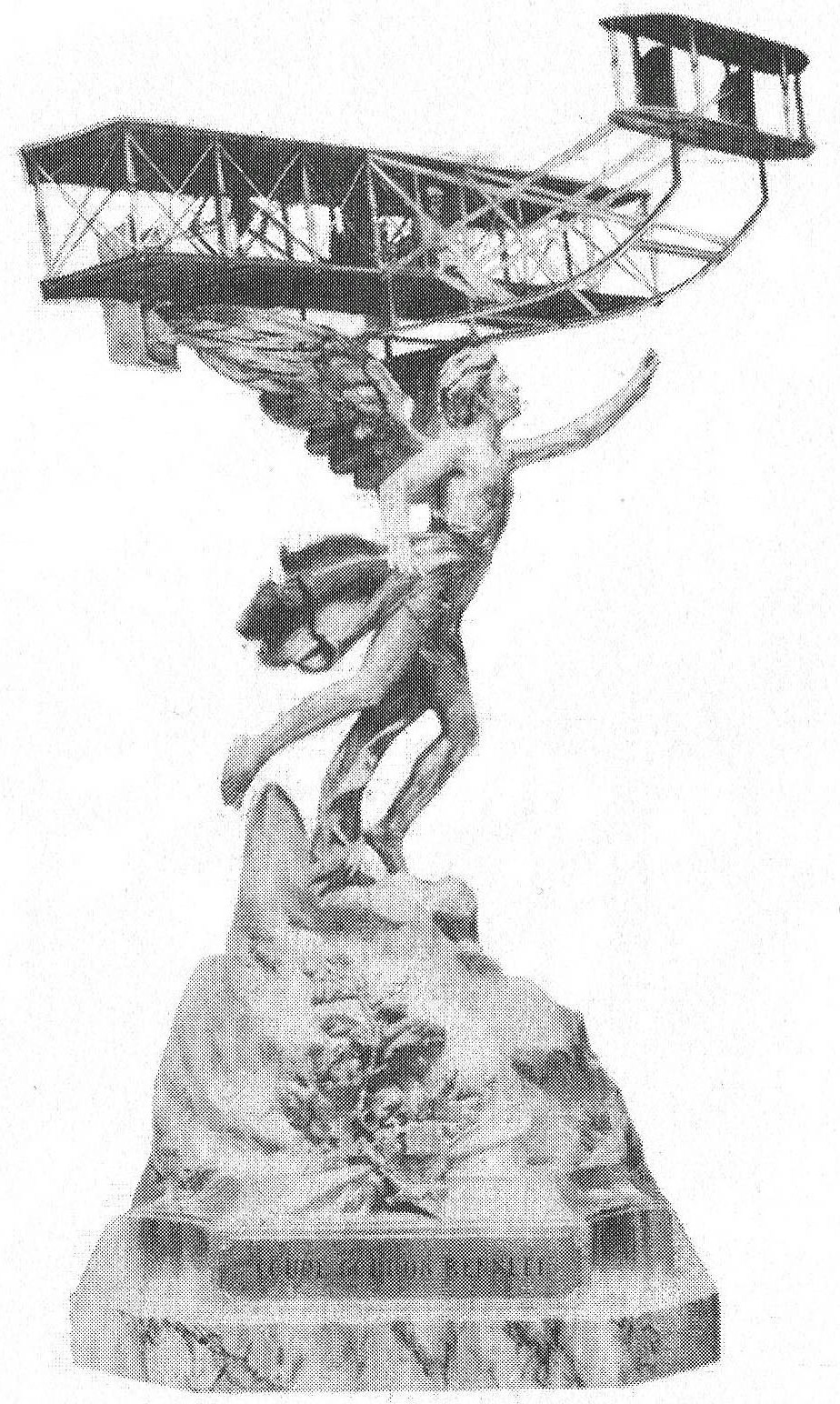
- Awarded for: Fastest time over a measured distance (time trial)
- Country: International
- Presented by: James Gordon Bennett, Jr.
- First award: 1909
- Final award: 1920

The Gordon Bennett Aviation Trophy is an international airplane racing trophy that was awarded by James Gordon Bennett Jr., the American owner and publisher of the New York Herald newspaper. The trophy is one of three Gordon Bennett awards: Bennett was also the sponsor of an automobile race and a ballooning competition.

The terms of the trophy competition were the same as those of the Schneider Trophy: each race was hosted by the nation which had won the preceding race, and the trophy would be won outright by the nation whose team won the race three times in succession. Accordingly, after Joseph Sadi-Lecointe's victory in 1920 the trophy became the permanent possession of the Aéro-Club de France.

== History ==
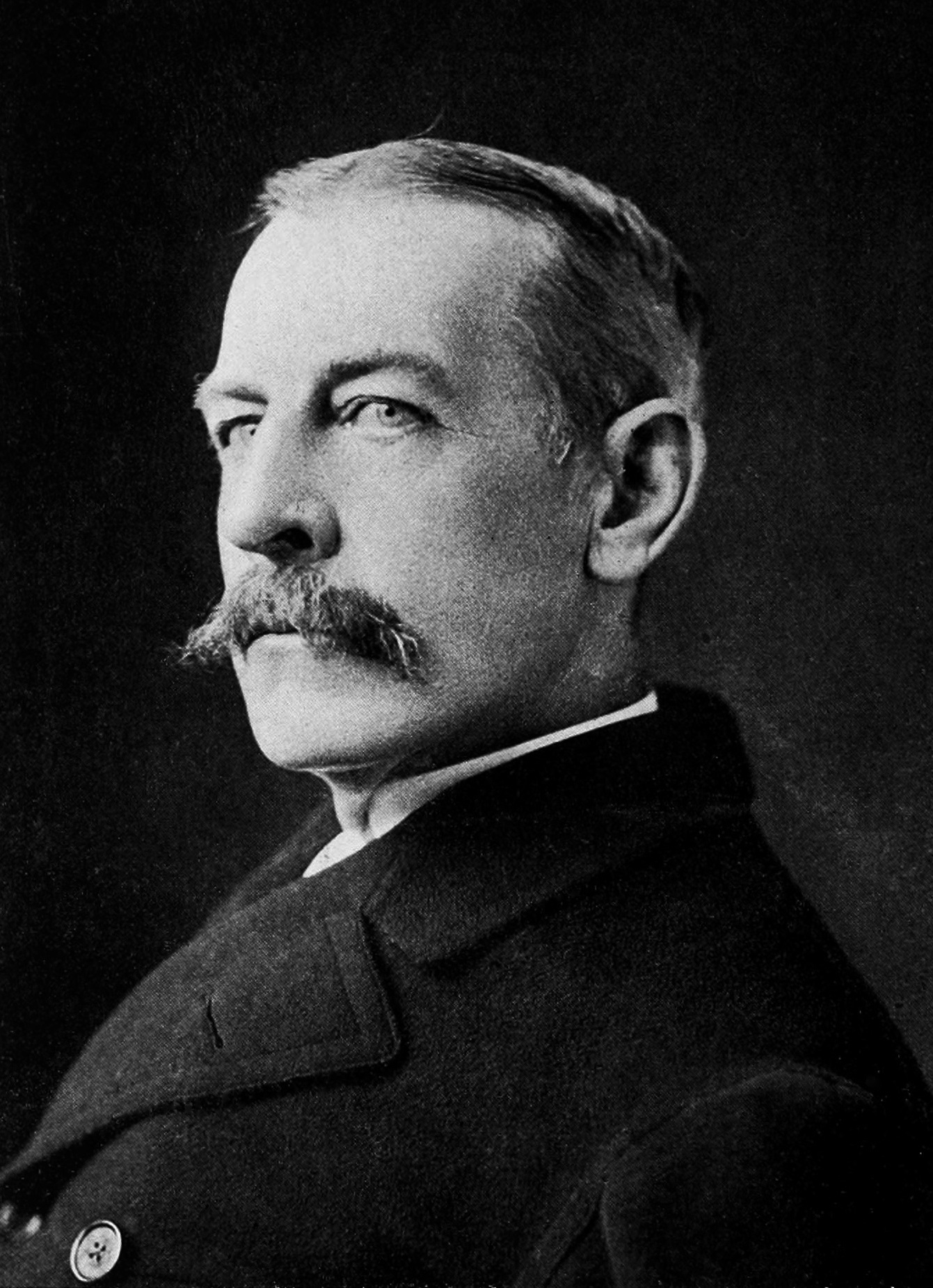
James Gordon Bennett

Following the success of the Gordon Bennett balloon competition, which had become the most important competition for the sport, Gordon Bennett announced a competition for powered aircraft in December 1908, commissioning a trophy from André Aucoc, the sculptor who had created the trophies for both the balloon and automobile competitions. Formulation of the competition rules was entrusted to the Aéro-Club de France. It was decided that each competing nation would be allowed to field a team of three competitors.

The 1909 competition was held as part of the Grande Semaine d'Aviation held at Reims in France, and consisted of two laps of a 10 km (6.2 mi) circuit. Like the subsequent competitions, it was not a direct race, but a time trial, with competitors taking off separately. As aircraft became faster and their engines more reliable, the distance to be covered was increased each year.

The last competition was held in 1920 in the French communes of Orléans and Étampes. Unlike those held before the First World War which were over short courses marked by pylons, the competition was held between two points 50 km (31 mi) apart because of the growing speed of aircraft. Joseph Sadi-Lecointe won in a time of 1 hour, 6 minutes and 17.2 seconds, while fellow French aviator Bernard de Roumanet finished second in a time of 1 hour, 39 minutes and 6.9 seconds.

== Competition winners ==
Year	Location	Winning pilot	Aircraft type	Distance	Time	Speed
1909	Reims, France	Glenn Curtiss	Curtiss No. 2	20 km (12 mi)	15 min 50.6 s	75.27 km/h (46.77 mph)
1910	Belmont Park, New York, US	Claude Grahame-White	Blériot XI	100 km (62 mi)	1 h 1 min 4.74 s	98.23 km/h (61.04 mph)
1911	Eastchurch, England	Charles Weymann	Nieuport II	150 km (93 mi)	1 h 11 min 36.2 s	125.69 km/h (78.10 mph)
1912	Clearing, Illinois, US	Jules Védrines	Deperdussin 1912 Racing Monoplane	200 km (124 mi)	1 h 10 min 56 s	169.7 km/h (105.4 mph)
1913	Reims, France	Maurice Prevost	Deperdussin Monocoque	200 km (124 mi)	59 min 45.6 s	200.8 km/h (124.8 mph)
1920	Orléans/Étampes, France	Joseph Sadi-Lecointe	Nieuport 29	300 km (186 mi)	1 h 6 min 17.2 s	271.55 km/h (168.73 mph)

The 1914 race was to have been held at Reims between 19 September and 28 September, but was cancelled due to the outbreak of the First World War. There was no contest in 1919.

=== 1909 ===
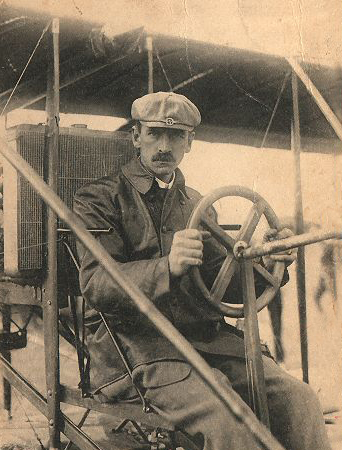
Glenn Curtiss in his Curtiss No. 2 aircraft

The selection trial for the French team was held on the first day of the Grande Semaine d'Aviation. Hampered by gusty winds and rain which turned the grass flying-field to glutinous mud, many of the twenty entrants were unable to take off, and none managed to complete the necessary two laps. Eugène Lefebvre, flying a Wright biplane put up the best performance, nearly completing the course; Louis Blériot, who had managed to fly about 2.5 km in a Blériot XI put up the next-best performance. It was decided that the third place would be given on the basis of performance in the speed competition to be held that afternoon, and was taken by Hubert Latham.

The Wrights themselves had passed on an invitation to compete at Reims, though it seemed awkward since the Gordon Bennett Trophy was crowned with a large replica of a Wright Flyer. The Aero Club of America, which had sponsored the Scientific American trophy won by Curtiss a year earlier, turned to him. His aircraft was not as well developed as the Wright machines and while it was more maneuverable than the European aircraft, it was not nearly as fast. Despite this disadvantage, in the race for the cup on August 28, 1909, Curtiss won in 15 minutes and 50.4 seconds. Blériot finished second place with a time of 15 minutes and 56.2 seconds, 5.8 seconds more than Curtiss.

Nationality	Pilot	Aircraft Type	Position	Time	Speed	Notes
France	Louis Blériot	Blériot XII	Second	15 min 56.2 s	75.31 km/h (46.80 mph)	
France	Hubert Latham	Antoinette VII	Third	17 min 32 s	68.44 km/h (42.53 mph)	
France	Eugène Lefebvre	Wright Model A	Fourth	20 min 47.6 s	57.71 km/h (35.86 mph)	
United Kingdom	George Bertram Cockburn	Farman III				Did not finish course
United States	Glenn Curtiss	Curtiss No. 2	First	15 min 50.4 s	75.74 km/h (47.06 mph)	

=== 1910 ===
The 1910 competition was held at the Belmont Park racetrack in New York as the culminating event of a week-long aviation meet. The 5 km course marked out for the competition attracted strong criticism from the competing pilots. Alfred Leblanc, captain of the French team, described it as a death-trap because of the obstacles which would hinder any pilot trying to make an emergency landing, and a tight turn less than 30 m (100 ft) from one of the grandstands was christened "Dead Man's Corner" by the press. However, the race proceeded as planned.

Contestants were permitted to start at any time during a seven-hour period on the day of the race. Claude Grahame-White was first to take off at 8:42, flying a Blériot XI powered by a 100 hp Gnome Double Omega and completing his first lap in 3 minutes 15 seconds. He was followed by Alec Ogilvie flying a Wright Model R at 9:08 and Alfred Leblanc at 9:20. Leblanc, who was the chief pilot for the Blériot company, was flying a 100 hp Blériot XI differing slightly from Grahame-White's, with a different propeller and a reduced wingspan. Leblanc's aircraft was clearly faster: after four laps his time was 1 minute 20 seconds better than Grahame-White's and he completed his nineteenth lap after 52 minutes 49.6 seconds in the air, Grahame-White having completed the 20 lap course in 1 hour 1 minute 4.47 seconds. However, half-way round the last lap Leblanc's engine stopped, either through fuel shortage or the breakage of a fuel line, and he had to make a forced landing, colliding with a telegraph pole but escaping serious injury.

Meanwhile, Alec Ogilvie had been forced to land by engine problems after 13 laps after a delay of 54 minutes he took off again and eventually completed the course in a total time of 2h 26m 36.6s, good enough to gain him third place.

Walter Brookins, flying the Wright "Baby Grand", was about to take off when Leblanc crashed, and decided to fly to the scene of the accident to see if he could help. However shortly after takeoff a connecting rod broke and his aircraft was wrecked in the subsequent forced landing. Brooking was unhurt. Hubert Latham took off at 10:59, but his attempt was plagued by engine failures, and he spent about four hours on the ground making repairs, eventually completing the course in 5h 48m 53s, an average speed of 28.6 km/h (17.8 mph).

Shortly before the latest permitted takeoff time John Drexel and John Moisant, both flying Blériot IXs, started their attempts. Drexel was forced to retire after seven laps, while Moisant completed the course in 1h 57s 44.8s after landing more than once with engine problems, securing second place.

Nationality	Pilot	Aircraft Type	Position	Time	Speed	Notes
France	Alfred Leblanc	100 hp Blériot XI				Crashed on last lap
France	Hubert Latham	Antoinette		5 h 48 m 53 s		
United Kingdom	Claude Grahame-White	100 hp Blériot XI	First	1 h 1 m 4.74 s	98.23 km/h (61.04 mph)	
United Kingdom	Alexander Ogilvie	Wright Model R	Third	2 h 6 min 36 s,	47.3 km/h (29.4 mph)	Time includes a 54-minute stop: Speed without stoppage time 83.4 km/h (51.8 mph)
United States	Walter Brookins	Wright "Baby Grand"				Crashed before starting race.
United States	John Drexel	Blériot XI				Retired after seven laps
United States	John Moisant	50 hp Blériot XI	Second	1 h 57 m 44.85 s		

=== 1911 ===
Charles Weymann standing in front of his Nieuport monoplane

The 1911 race was held on 1 July at the Royal Aeronautical Society's flying field at Eastchurch, and attracted a crowd of around 10,000 spectators despite the comparative remoteness to the location. Both France and Britain entered three pilots with three reserves, the British entries including a Bristol Prier monoplane to be flown by Grahame Gilmour, but this was not ready in time to compete. The competition coincided with the Circuit of Europe air race, as a result of which the British pilot James Valentine withdrew: however Charles Weymann, the sole American representative chose to withdraw from the Circuit of Europe to take part in the Gordon Bennett competition.

The start of the competition was delayed by poor weather, and the first competitor Gustav Hamel, did not take off until 2:50 in the afternoon. Flying a Blériot XXIII monoplane which had been modified shortly before the race by having its wings cut down by about a metre (39 in), he misjudged his first turn and crashed at high speed, astonishingly escaping without serious injury. At 3:00 Louis Chevalier, flying a Nieuport II powered by a 28 horsepower (21 kW) Nieuport engine. After five laps his engine began showing signs of trouble and he was eventually forced to land after eleven laps, damaging his undercarriage. He then resumed his attempt flying a replacement aircraft, but this also suffered an engine failure shortly after takeoff and he was forced to withdraw. Weymann took off at 3:45, impressing spectators by the steepness of his banked turns, shortly followed at 4:47 by Alec Ogilvie, flying the aircraft in which he had finished third the previous year, now powered by a 50 hp N.E.C engine. Last to take off were Edouard Nieuport and Alfred Leblanc. Leblanc was recovering from influenza and, probably made cautious by Hamel's crash, did not take the corners as sharply as Weymann, and Nieuport's aircraft, with a less powerful engine that Weyman's, was clearly not in serious competition.

Nationality	Pilot	Aircraft Type	Position	Time	Speed	Notes
France	Alfred Leblanc	Blériot XXIII(100 hp Gnome)	Second	73 m 40.2 s	122.17 km/h (75.91 mph)	
France	Edouard Nieuport	Nieuport II 70 hp Gnome	Third	74m 37.2s	120.61 km/h (74.94 mph)	
France	Louis Chevalier	Nieuport II (28 hp. Nieuport)				Retired
United Kingdom	Gustav Hamel	Bleriot XXIII (100 hp Gnome)				Crashed during race
United Kingdom	Alexander Ogilvie	Wright Model R	Fourth	109 min 10.4 s	82.44 km/h (51.23 mph)	
United States	C.T. Weymann	Nieuport IV (100 hp Gnome)	First	71m 36.2 s	125.69 km/h (78.10 mph)	

=== 1912 ===
The 1912 race was held on 9 September in Clearing, Illinois. The race was 30 laps around an elliptical 4.14 miles (6.66 km) course, for a total distance of 124.8 miles (200.8 km). As none of the U.S. aircraft available to fly that day could exceed 78 mph (126 km/h), and with Védrines practice flights averaging far better, a French win was expected prior to the start of the race.

Nationality	Pilot	Aircraft Type	Position	Time	Speed	Notes
France	Jules Védrines	Deperdussin Racing Monoplane 140 hp	First	70 min 56 s	169.7 km/h (105.4 mph)	
France	Maurice Prévost	Deperdussin Racing Monoplane 100 hp	Second	72 min 55	167 km/h (104 mph)	
France	André Frey	Hanriot				Retired due to engine overheating after completing 22 laps at an average speed of 150 km/h (93 mph)
United Kingdom	Claude Grahame-White					
United Kingdom	Gustav Hamel					
United Kingdom	George Dyott					
United States	Paul W. Beck	Columbia Monoplane				
United States	DeLloyd Thompson	Nieuport Monoplane				
United States	Howard Gill	Wright Biplane				

=== 1913 ===
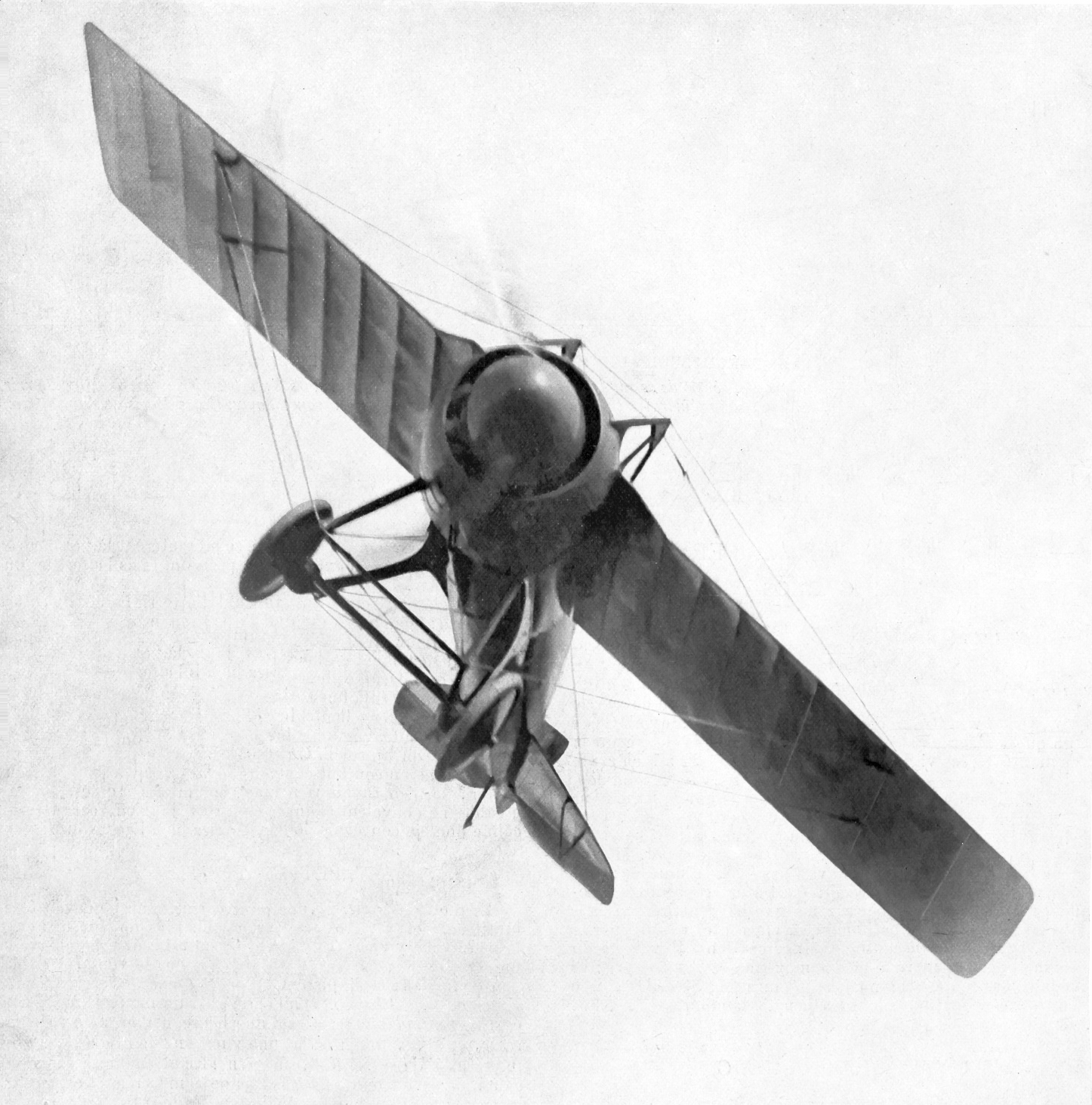
Maurice Prévost flies his Deperdussin Monocoque around the mast for the 1913 trophy.

The 1913 event was held between the 27–29 September, 1913 at the Aerodrome de Champagne near Rheims, France.

Nationality	Pilot	Aircraft Type	Position	Time	Speed	Notes
France	Maurice Prévost	Deperdussin Monocoque	First	59 min 45.6 s	200.4 km/h (124.5 mph)	
France	Emile Védrines	Ponnier D.III	Second	60 min 51.4 s	198 km/h (123 mph)	
France	Eugène Gilbert	Deperdussin Monocoque	Third	62 min 55 s	192.3 km/h (119.5 mph)	
Belgium	Henri Crombez	Deperdussin Monocoque	Fourth	69 min 52 s	172.0 km/h (106.9 mph)	

=== 1920 ===
Nationality	Pilot	Aircraft Type	Position	Time	Speed	Notes
France	Joseph Sadi-Lecointe	Nieuport-Delage NiD 29	First	1 hr 6 min 17.2 s	266.3 km/h (165.5 mph)	
France	Bernard de Roumanet	SPAD S.20	Second	1 hr 39 min 6.9 s	182.7 km/h (113.5 mph)	Finished course after making a stop due to engine trouble: his flying time over the course was 266.3 km/h (165.5 mph)
United Kingdom	F. P. Raynham	Martinsyde Semiquaver				Retired due to oil pump failure
U.S.A.	Howard Rinehart	Dayton-Wright RB-1 Racer				Retired due to broken elevator control cable
U.S.A.	Rudolph W. Schroeder	Verville-Packard R-1				Did not finish due to engine overheating

== See also ==
- List of aviation awards
- National Air Races
- Schneider Trophy

== Bibliography ==
- Casey, Louis S. Curtiss: The Hammondsport Era, 1907–1915. New York: Crown Publishers, 1981. ISBN 978-0-517-54565-2.
- Villard, Henry Serrano Blue Ribbon of the Air. Washington: Smithsonian Press, 1987. ISBN 0-87474-942-5.
