= 1911 Paris to Madrid air race =

International flying competition

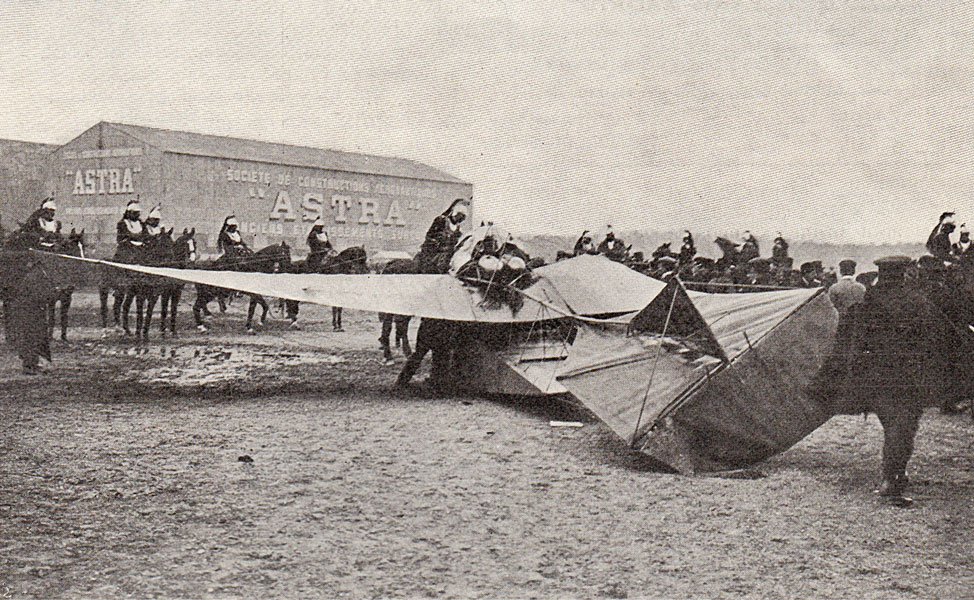
The crash of the Louis Émile Train monoplane

The 1911 Paris to Madrid air race was a three-stage international flying competition, the first of several European air races of that summer. The winner was French aviator Jules Védrines, although his win, along with the rest of the race, were overshadowed by a notorious fatal crash at takeoff.

== Organization ==
The air race was organized by the French newspaper Le Petit Parisien, at least partly inspired by the success of its competitor Le Matin in sponsoring the Circuit de l'Est air race of August 1910, and profiting from its increased circulation.

The first stage was to begin at the French airfield at Issy-les-Moulineaux and end 400 km (250 mi) to the south-southwest in Angoulême; the difficult second stage was from Angoulême over the Pyrenees to the seaside Spanish town of San Sebastián; the final leg of about 462 km (287 mi) was from San Sebastián over the Sierra de Guadarrama range to Madrid. The first prize was 100,000 francs, with 30,000 francs as second prize and 15,000 francs for third place.

== Start of race and accident ==
An estimated crowd of 300,000 spectators gathered in the predawn hours of Sunday, 21 May 1911. The competitors were to take off at five-minute intervals starting at 5.00, but flying started at around 3.45, when Jules Védrines and Andre Frey made short trial flights.

The first competitor to take off, at 5:10, was Andre Beaumont, followed by Roland Garros and Eugène Gilbert. Frey took off at 5:35, made a circuit of the field, and landed; after some adjustments, he tried again at 6:00, but damaged a wheel and had to delay his attempt for repairs. The next competitor was not ready, and the following, Garnier, only made a short flight. He was followed by Jules Védrines, who immediately after takeoff attempted to land, since his aircraft was not handling properly. The crowd had begun to get out of control around six, spilling out of the enclosures onto the flying field, and although no one other than the aviators, their assistants, and race officials were meant to enter the flying area, a party of government ministers had also left their grandstand. In an effort to avoid the spectators, he crashed, escaping injury, but severely damaging his aircraft. At 6:22, Le Lasseur de Ranssay departed and at 6:30 Louis Émile Train was called to the starting line.

In Train's own words:

" As soon as I left the ground, I perceived that the motor was not working well. I was about to land, after making a turn to one side, when I saw a detachment of cuirassiers crossing the flying track. I then tried to make a short curve to avoid them, and to land in the opposite direction, but my motor at that moment failed more and more, and I was unable to undertake the curve. I raised the machine, to get over the troops and to land beyond them. At that very moment, a group of persons, who had been hidden from my view by the cuirassiers, scattered before me in every direction. I tried to do the impossible, risking the life of my passenger to prolong my flight, and to get beyond the last persons of the group. I was about to come to land, when the apparatus, which had been raised almost vertically, dropped heavily to the ground. I got out from under the machine, with my passenger, believing that I had avoided any accident. It was only then that I learned the terrible misfortune."

Prime Minister of France Ernest Monis was left unconscious, with a broken leg. Monis's son, and tycoon and aviation patron Henri Deutsch de la Meurthe, were both injured. The French Minister of War, Henri Maurice Berteaux, lost an arm and sustained a fatal head wound.

The crash caused a panic in the crowd, causing more injuries and the suspension of all further activity. With the approval of the injured Monis, the event continued the next day, but only two more flyers departed, Védrines and Andre Frey.

== Competitors ==
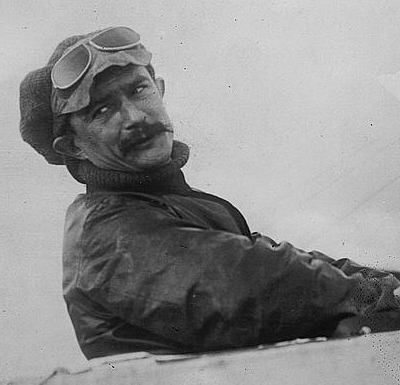
Socialist aviator Jules Védrines, winner of the race

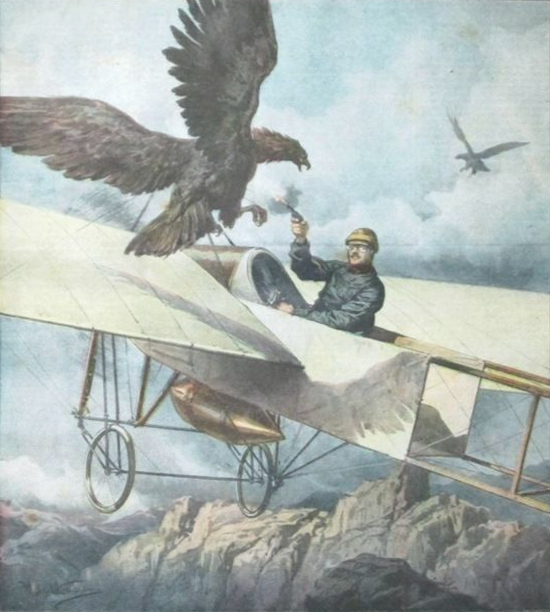
A painting depicting Eugène Gilbert in a Bleriot XI being attacked by an eagle over the Pyrenees in 1911

- Jules Védrines, flying a Morane-Borel monoplane, was the winner of the race, and the only competitor to finish. After a total time of 37 1/2 hours (12 hours and 18 minutes in the air), he took the 30,000-franc prize and was awarded the Cross of the Order of Alfonso XII by Spanish King Alfonso, despite being in such a foul mood at landing that doctors were called to assess his mental health.
- Jean Louis Conneau (flying as "Andre Beaumont") had landed his Bleriot XI at Loches, a little further than halfway to the first destination, for engine maintenance, then crashed there on takeoff.
- André Frey, in a Morane-Saulnier, went no farther than Etampes before damaging his craft.
- Scheduled competitors who withdrew after the fatal crash included Charles Terres Weymann. Belgian John Verrept yielded his aircraft to Védrines.
- Eugene Gilbert, flying a Bleriot XI: While over the Pyrenees en route to Madrid, Gilbert was attacked by a large eagle, which he warded off using a revolver.
