= Édouard Nieuport =

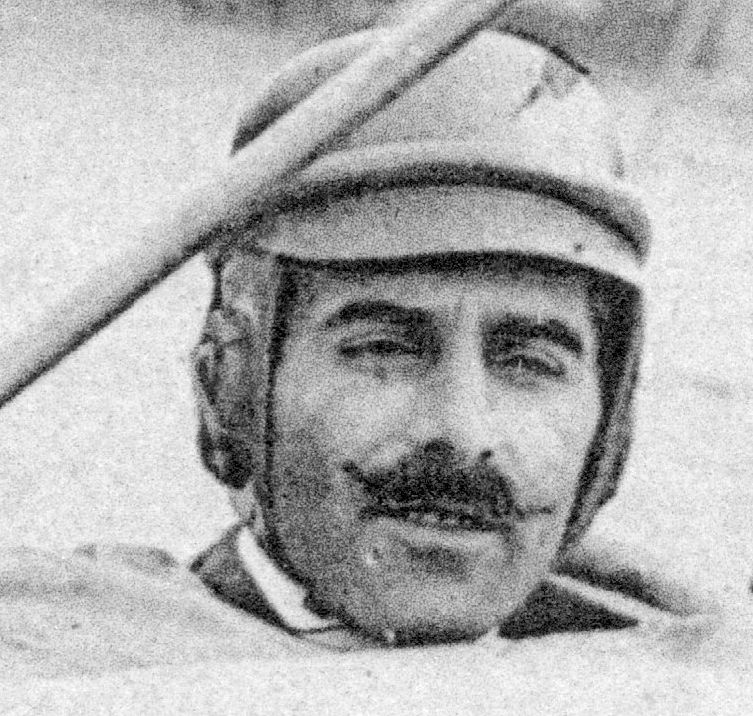
- Édouard Nieuport aboard a Nieuport aircraft
- Born: Édouard de Niéport; 1875; Blidah
- Died: 16 September 1911 (aged 36); Charny
- Cause of death: Aircraft crash
- Occupations: Engineer; Aircraft designer
- Relatives: Charles de Niéport (brother)

Édouard de Niéport, usually known as Édouard Nieuport (1875–1911) was the co-founder with his brother Charles of the eponymous Nieuport aircraft manufacturing company, Société Anonyme Des Établissements Nieuport, formed in 1909 at Issy-les-Moulineaux. An engineer and sportsman, Édouard was also one of the pre-eminent aeroplane designers and pilots of the early aviation era (from the late 19th century to the outbreak of World War I in 1914).

As a pilot, he set a new world speed record of 74.37 miles per hour (119.69 km/h) on 11 May 1911 at Mourmelon, flying his Nieuport II monoplane, powered by a 28 horsepower (21 kW) engine of his own design. Later that year at Châlons, he bettered this time with a new record of 82.73 miles per hour (133.14 km/h). Racing for the Gordon Bennett Trophy in July at Eastchurch, he finished third, beaten for first place by one of his own aircraft, flown by the American pilot C. T. Weymann.

== Biography ==
He was born on 24 August 1875 in Blida, Algeria, the son of an officer in the French army, and brother of fellow aviator Charles de Niéport. He died after the wing of his aircraft stalled during a turn during a military display on 16 September 1911 in Charny, France.

== Records set by his aircraft ==
At Buc the same year, the pilot Gobé set a new closed-circuit distance record of 459.968 miles (740.247 km) in a Nieuport design. In the Gordon Bennett Trophy race his designs were placed both first and third.

As a designer, his aeroplanes won many awards, prizes, and competitions during 1910 and 1911, not to mention achieving some historical firsts: His early Nieuport II (Roman numeral two, not the later famous type eleven), was flown at Rheims in July 1910, and was judged by many as the best in the show. On 24 October 1911 a Nieuport IVG, flown for the Italian Army Air Corps in North Africa by Capitano Moizo, made the second-ever reconnaissance flight by a military aeroplane, and perhaps the first bombing run. A Nieuport monoplane, flown by Weymann, won the French Military Aircraft trials competition held in October and November 1911.

== Legacy ==
His brother Charles de Niéport, who continued his work, died in a crash landing on 24 January 1913. Édouard's designs continued to be built by the company and licensed for production internationally. His aircraft were all monoplanes, not the biplanes for which the company became famous during the First World War. His monoplanes were sold throughout Europe, and involved in many other aviation firsts:

- The first round trip over the Mediterranean in 1913, flown by Lieutenants Destrem and de l'Escaille of the Marine Nationale from St. Rafael to Ajaccio in Corsica and back.
- A world altitude record of 20,079 ft (6,120 m) by Georges Legagneux, also at St. Raphael.
- A seven-week flight from Villacoublay to Cairo by pilot Marc Bonnier and a passenger.
- Some of the first tests of machine-gun mounting on aircraft.
- The first ever successful loop, performed by Lieutenant Pyotr Nesterov of the Imperial Russian Air Service on 20 August 1913.

In January 1914 Gustave Delage joined the company and by converting the Type 10 monoplane into a sesquiplane ("one and a half wing" aircraft) with a full-chord upper wing and a single-spar, half-chord lower wing), began to develop the highly successful for which the Nieuport company would be famous during World War I.
