= Blériot XXIII =

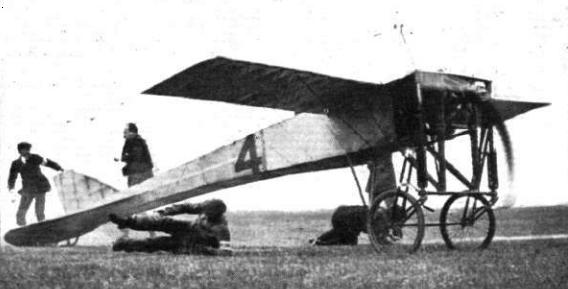
- Gustave Hamel's Type XXIII about to start the Gordon Bennett race.

General information
- Type: Racing aircraft
- National origin: France
- Manufacturer: Blériot Aéronautique
- Number built: 2

History
- First flight: 1911

The Blériot XXIII was a racing monoplane produced in 1911 by Blériot Aéronautique. Two were built, both of which were flown in the 1911 Gordon Bennett Trophy competition at Eastchurch; one, flown by Alfred Leblanc, achieving second place. Leblanc had previously set a world speed record of 125 km/h (78 mph) on 12 June 1911 at the eliminating trial for the French Gordon Bennett entrant.

== Design and development ==
The Blériot XXIII was a shoulder-wing monoplane with a fully covered square-section fuselage with a down-curved appearance and extremely narrow chord wings.

After it was apparent that the aircraft was some five seconds a lap slower than the Nieuport II being flown by Charles Weymann, Blériot altered both machines by shortening the wings, reducing the span to around 5.2 m (17 ft). The result was described by C. G. Grey, editor of The Aeroplane, as looking "more like the latter half of a dogfish with a couple of visiting cards stuck on it than anything else".

Gustav Hamel was the first competitor to start, but after misjudging a turn on the first lap he crashed spectacularly, throwing him out of the aircraft. Miraculously, he only sustained minor injuries. The second aircraft, flown by Alfred Leblanc finished second, his time of 73 minutes 40.2 seconds putting him just over two minutes behind Charles Weymann, who won the event.

== Specifications ==
Data from Opdycke 1990, p.56

General characteristics

- Crew: 1
- Length: 7.62 m (25 ft 0 in)
- Wingspan: 7.16 m (23 ft 6 in) Before reduction in span
- Wing area: 9.0 m^{2} (96.87 sq ft) Before reduction in span
- Powerplant: 1 × Gnome Omega Omega 14-cylinder two-row air cooled rotary engine, 75 kW (100 hp)
- Propellers: 2-bladed

== Bibliography ==
- Opdycke, Leonard E. French Aeroplanes Before the Great War. Atglen, PA: Schiffer, 1999. ISBN 0-7643-0752-5
- Villard, Henry Serrano Blue Ribbon of the Air. Washington: Smithsonian Press, 1987. ISBN 0-87474-942-5.
