= Grande Semaine d'Aviation de la Champagne =

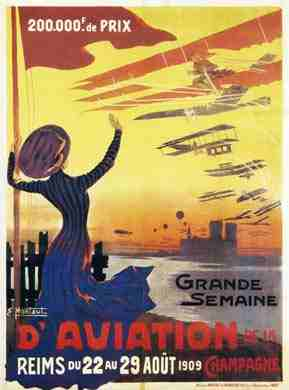
Advertising poster for the Grande Semaine d'Aviation

The Grande Semaine d'Aviation de la Champagne was an eight-day aviation meeting held near Reims in France in 1909, so-named because it was sponsored by the major local champagne growers. It is celebrated as the first international public flying event, confirming the viability of heavier-than-air flight.

It marked the first contest for the prestigious Gordon Bennett Trophy, sponsored by Gordon Bennett, publisher of the New York Herald, won by American Glenn Curtiss in competition with Louis Bleriot. The meeting saw the breaking of the world record for distance, a flight of 180 km (110 mi) by Henri Farman, as well as the debut of the lightweight Gnome engine, which would achieve much acclaim.

== Grande Semaine de la Champagne ==
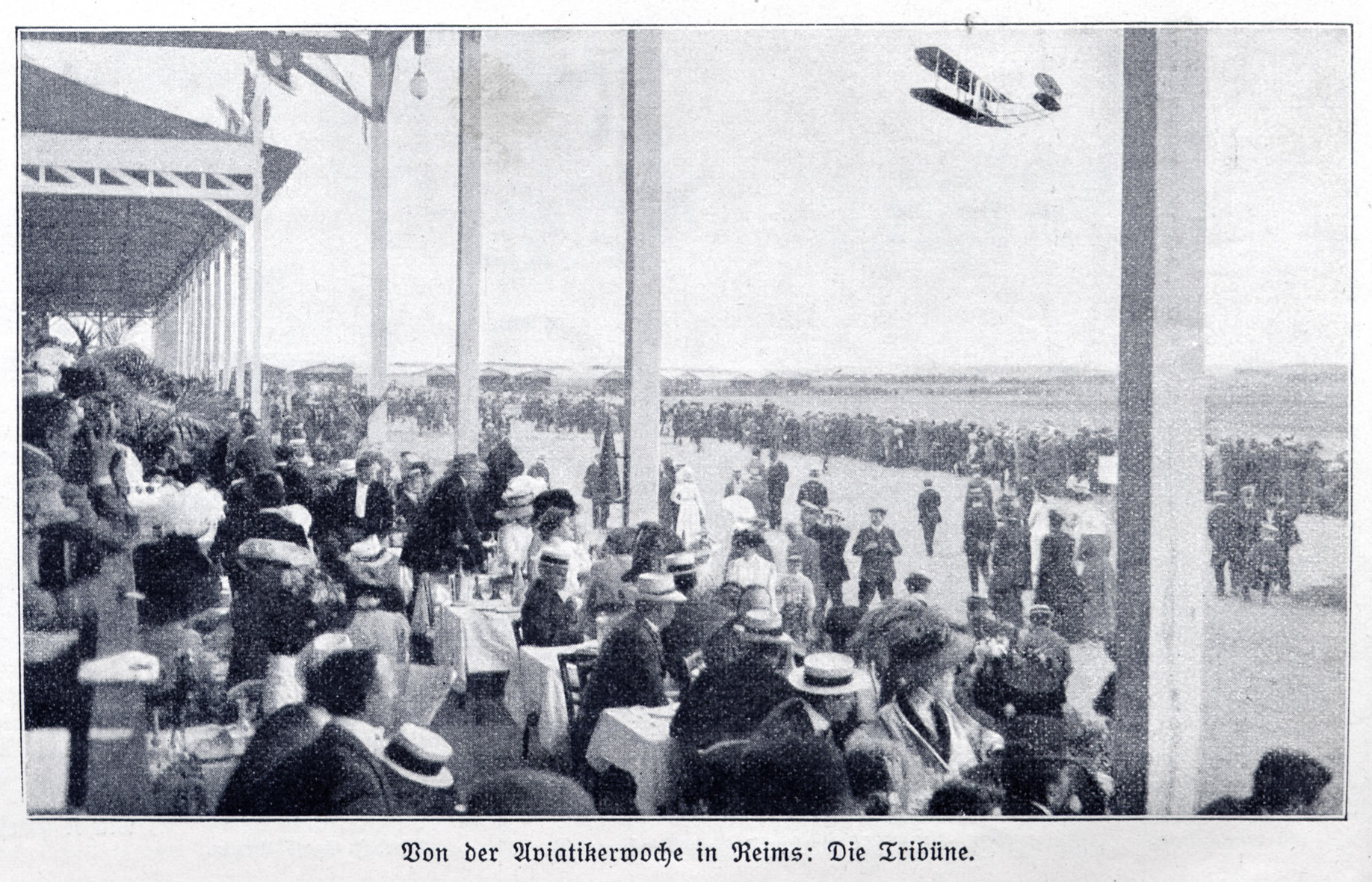
A French built Wright Biplane flies in front of the packed grandstand at the Grande Semaine d'Aviation

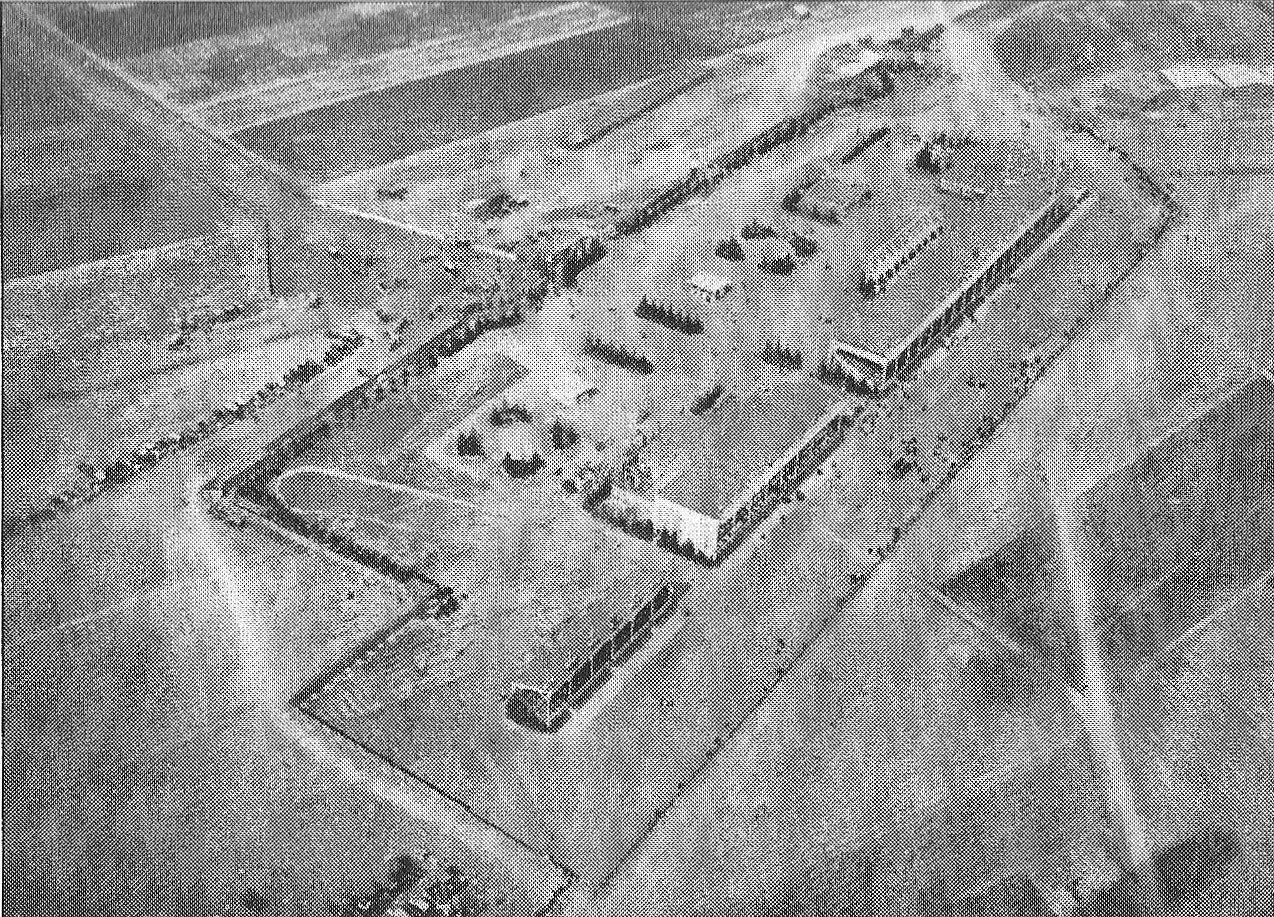
Tribunes from the sky.

The Grand Semaine d'Aviation, held between 22 August and 29 August 1909, was sponsored by many of the leading makers of champagne including Moët et Chandon and Mumm and organised by a committee headed by the Marquis de Polignac. It was the first international public flying event and was seen both at the time and by later historians as marking the coming of age of heavier-than-air aviation. Almost all of the prominent aviators of the time took part, and the 500,000 visitors included Armand Fallières, the president of the French Republic and the British Chancellor of the Exchequer, David Lloyd George. British attendees included Lord Northcliffe (the newspaper publisher) (Note: Through prizes sponsored by the Daily Mail newspaper Northcliffe was a promoter of aviation) and General French (Note: Later Chief of the Imperial General Staff, and commander of the British Expeditionary Force at the start of the First World War) It was held on the plain of Bétheny, about 5 km (3 mi) north of Reims, which later became the Reims – Champagne Air Base. A large grandstand was constructed for the event, together with a row of sheds to accommodate the aircraft. Next to the grandstand was the "Popular enclosure", complete with an enormous scoreboard. Amenities for the spectators included a restaurant that could seat 600 people, an area of specially laid lawn with bandstands and flowerbeds, and a post office, from which 50,000 postcards were sent each day and nearly a million words dispatched by press correspondents. The spectator area was only a few hundred metres from the Laon-Reims railway line, and a temporary station was provided.

A rectangular competition course of 10 km (6.2 mi), marked by four pylons was set up for the various competitions, with the strip intended for taking off and landing in front of the grandstands, opposite which was the timekeepers hut, provided with a signalling system to indicate to the spectators which event was being competed for. Flying conditions were primitive: the area over which much of the flying was to take place was farmland: some of the crops under cultivation had not been harvested and where this had been done there were haystacks: more than one flyer was to fall foul of these obstacles.

== Events ==
- Sunday 22 August — Contest to decide the French team for the Gordon-Bennett Trophy; Prix de la Vitesse, (day 1); Prix du Tour de Piste, (day 1); Prix des Aeronauts, (day 1).
- Monday 23 August — Grand Prix de la Champagne (day 1); Prix du Tour de Piste (day 2); Prix des Aeronauts (day 2) .
- Tuesday 24 August — Grand Prix de la Vitesse (day 2); Prix du Tour de Piste, (day 3); Prix des Aeronauts (day 3). This was the day of the presidential visit.
- Wednesday 25 August — Grand Prix de la Champagne (day 2); Prix du Tour de Piste, (day 4); Prix des Aeronauts (day 4).
- Thursday 26 August — Grand Prix de la Champagne (day 3); Prix du Tour de Piste, (day 5); Prix des Aeronauts (day 5); Landing competition for spherical balloons.
- Friday 27 August — Grand Prix de la Champagne (day 4); Prix du Tour de Piste (day 6); Prix des Aeronauts (day 6).
- Saturday 28 August — Coupe Internationale d'Aviation Gordon-Bennett; Prix des Passagers (day 1); Prix du Tour de Piste (day 7); Prix des Aeronauts (day 7).
- Sunday 29 August — Prix de la Vitesse (day 3); Prix des Passagers (day 2); Prix de l'Altitude; Prix du Tour de Piste (day 8); Prix des Aeronauts (day 8)

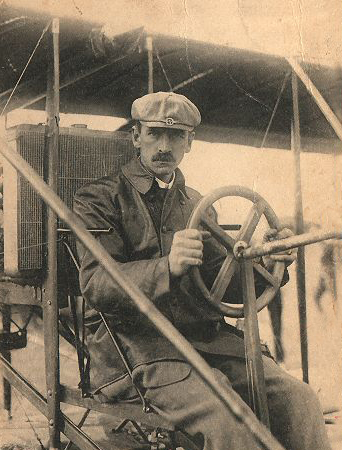
A souvenir postcard showing Glenn Curtiss at the controls of his aircraft

=== The Gordon Bennett Trophy ===
This was the most prestigious event of the meeting, and was a competition between national teams, sponsored by Gordon Bennett, the publisher of the New York Herald, and was being held for the first time. It consisted of a time trial over two laps of the 10 km (6 mi) circuit rather than a direct race, and each nation was allowed three entrants. The qualification trials for the French team on the Sunday morning were hampered by the weather conditions, with the most successful competitor, Eugène Lefebvre, flying a French-built Wright biplane, narrowly failing to complete two laps of the course: the only other pilot to make a convincing flight was Louis Blériot, and the third place was later given to Hubert Latham flying an Antoinette monoplane, on account of his performance in trials for the Prix de la Vitesse held later that day, during which "the wonderful and unprecedented spectacle was witnessed of seven machines in the air at one time". Other nations were represented by the American aviator Glenn Curtiss and George Cockburn, flying a French Farman III biplane, representing Great Britain: promised Italian and Austrian entries did not materialise. On the Saturday of the race Curtiss made the first flights, first making an attempt for the Circuit Prize and lowering the record to 7 m 55.4 s. Encouraged by this, he then made his attempt for the Trophy, completing the two laps in 15 m 50.4 s. Cockburn made the next attempt, but was unable to complete one lap. Lefebvre then made the first attempt by the French team, only managing a time of 20 m 47.6 s. Latham's time was 16 m 32 s. Blériot, flying last, managed a first lap time in the same time as Curtiss' second (faster) lap, but during the second round he was impeded by a squall, and his total time was 15 min 56.1 sec. Under the rules of the Trophy, Curtiss' victory meant that the next race would be held in America. Later in the day Blériot did secure one prize, that for the fastest circuit, with a time of 7 m 47.4 s.

=== Grand Prix de Champagne et la Ville de Reims ===
This was a distance prize offering six prizes of 50,000, 25,000, 10,000, 5,000, 5,000, and 5,000 francs. The competition for this award resulted in the world record for distance being broken three times in three days, the prize eventually being won by Henri Farman with a flight of 180 km (110 mi), flying a Farman III biplane. Farman eventually landed because the competition stopped at half-past seven, and any distance flown after this time did not count. On landing, in the words of the correspondent from the London Times he was "seized upon by the enthusiastic crowd and carried in triumph to the buffet, where a scene of almost delirious excitement was witnessed" Although French by upbringing, Farman's father was British and he was therefore also technically British, this mixed nationality being celebrated by a military band playing both the French and the British national anthems to celebrate his victory.

Farman had replaced the Vivinus engine of his aircraft, which was proving unreliable, with a Gnome Omega rotary engine just before the flight. Since the published rules of competition forbade any changes to the aircraft, his victory was contested by Latham and Léon Levavasseur, the designer of the Antoinette aircraft and engine, but the change had been officially approved before the flight, and their complaint was not successful. The Reims meeting was the public debut of the Gnome engine, and although probably unappreciated by the majority of the spectators, this was one of the most significant events to take place at the Rheims meeting. The Gnome, designed and manufactured by the Seguin brothers, was both light in weight and relatively reliable, and was a major advance in aviation technology: Louis Blériot later saying "it enabled the industry to advance by leaps and bounds" Three other aircraft were flown using this engine at Reims, the others being the Farman biplanes belonging to Cockburn and Roger Sommer and the Voisin belonging to Louis Paulhan

=== Grand Prix de la Vitesse ===
Offering four prizes of 10,000, 5,000, 3,000 and 2,000 francs, for the fastest time over three laps of the circuit. The final attempts for this were held on the last day, and after Curtiss' narrow victory over Blériot spectators were expecting an exciting duel. However, Blériot had a spectacular accident: his aircraft crashed and caught fire, and was destroyed: the prize went to Curtiss.

=== Prix des Passagers ===
A single prize of 10,000 francs, given to the aviator who carried the greatest number of passengers over one lap of the course: in the event of two contestant carrying the same number of passengers the prize going to the fastest. Won by Farman, the only pilot to carry two passengers.

=== Prix de l'Altitude ===
(Height Prize) of 10,000 francs. Won by Hubert Latham flying an Antoinette VII with an altitude of 155 m (509 ft)

=== Prix du Tour de Piste ===
(Circuit Prize), of 7,000 and 3,000 francs for the fastest single lap. Won by Louis Blériot, flying his Type XII monoplane, with a speed of 76.95 km/h (47.8 mph).

=== Prix des Aéronats ===
A speed trial over five laps for dirigibles. No attempts were made until the last day, when the French Army dirigible Colonel Renard won with a time of 1 hr. 19 m. The only other competitor was a Zodiac dirigible.

=== Flyers and aircraft ===
38 aircraft were entered for the event, but in the end only 23 actually flew, representing nine different types. 87 flights of more than 5 km (3.1 mi) were made The type which was best represented was the Voisin biplane, of which there were seven examples flown. This reflects Gabriel Voisin's position as the first manufacturer to achieve widespread sales of an aircraft, but by this time his design was obsolescent, the only notable achievement being Louis Paulhan's third place in the distance competition. Significantly, Paulhan's aircraft was fitted with a Gnome engine. The meeting effectively demonstrated the practicality of heavier than air aviation: it was evident that the major problem was the unreliability of the engines being used. Many previous notable aviation feats, such as Louis Blériot's recent crossing of the English Channel, had been made near the times of sunrise or sunset, when the air is often very still. In contrast, competition flying at Reims did not start until ten in the morning and ended at half past seven, and although high winds did cause the black flags signalling 'no flying' to be hoisted on occasion, all days saw some flying.

The destruction by fire of Louis Blériot's aircraft on the last day was the most spectacular accident to occur during the meeting, and Blériot had been involved in another accident earlier in the week while practising for the passenger carrying event, when he had to make an emergency landing due to engine trouble, Unfortunately there was a troop of dragoons in the way: in swerving to avoid them, he collided with the railings separating the spectator area from the flying track. The damage was repaired overnight. At the time only one aviator had been killed in an aircraft crash, and Flight magazine could write of the "customary good luck of the aviator" when referring to aviators walking away from accidents which wrecked the aircraft: aircraft of the time were slow, generally flown at low altitudes and their wooden construction often meant that the force of impact was absorbed by the disintegration of the airframe, but within a month of the event two of the participating flyers, Lefebvre and Ferdinand Ferber, were to be killed in aircraft accidents.
