= Jules Védrines =

French aviation pioneer (1881–1919)

Jules Charles Toussaint Védrines
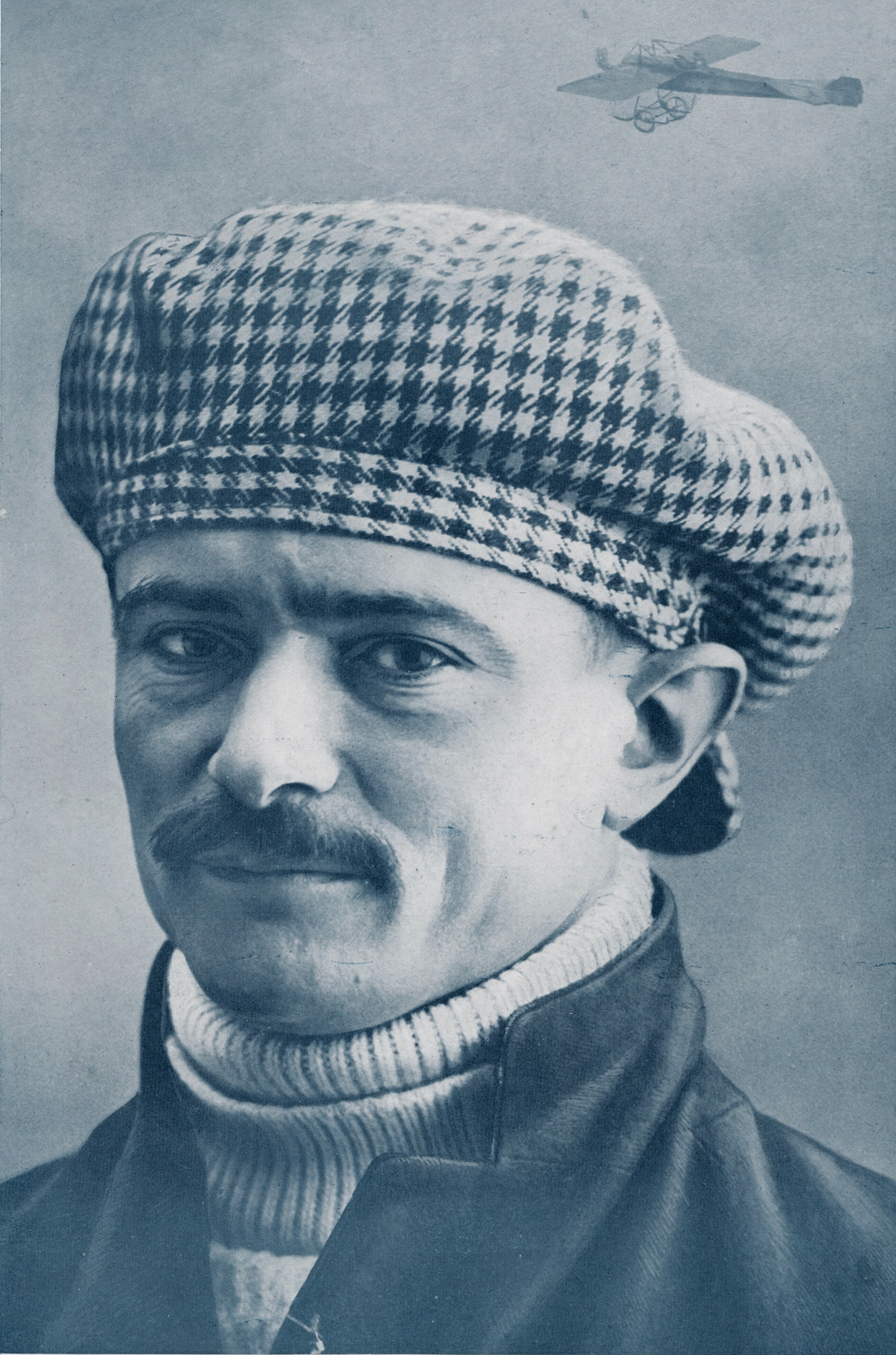
- Jules Vedrines in 1912
- Born: 29 December 1881; Saint-Denis, France
- Died: 21 April 1919 (aged 37); Saint-Rambert-d'Albon, France
- Cause of death: Aircraft accident
- Resting place: Cimetière parisien de Pantin
- Known for: Air racing First pilot to fly at more than 100 mph Winner of 1912 Gordon Bennett Trophy race
- Children: Henri Vedrines
- Relatives: Henri Védrines (son) [French Wikipedia] Emile Védrines (brother)
- Aviation career
- Flight license: 7 December 1910; Pau, Pyrénées-Atlantiques

Jules Charles Toussaint Védrines (29 December 1881 – 21 April 1919) was an early French aviator, notable for being the first pilot to fly at more than 100 mph and for winning the Gordon Bennett Trophy race in 1912.

== Biography ==
Jules Védrines was born in Saint-Denis, an industrial suburb of Paris, on 21 December 1881.

He was raised in the tough back alleys of Paris, shaping his rough and foul-mouthed nature which nevertheless made him a favorite of the French public. He was apprenticed to the Gnome engine manufacturing company, after which he spent six months in England as Robert Loraine's mechanic in 1910, and then returned to France, where he gained his pilot's license (no. 312) on 7 December 1910 at the Blériot school at Pau. His rise to become one of the most prominent pilots of the time started when he won the 1911 Paris to Madrid air race in May 1911 flying a Morane-Borel monoplane, although the previous month he had attracted attention by dropping bouquets of violets onto the Mi-carême procession as it entered the Place de la Concorde in Paris. That year he also came second in the Circuit of Britain race and third in the Circuit of Europe race. In 1912, flying the Deperdussin 1912 Racing Monoplane he was the first person to fly an aircraft at more than 100 mph (160 km/h) and he also won the Gordon Bennett Trophy race.

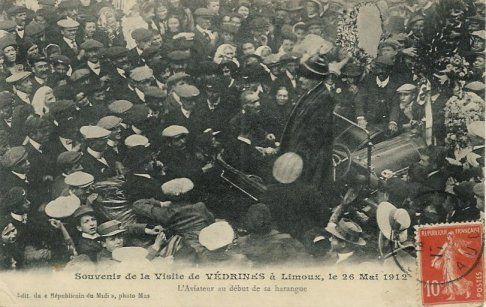
Védrines electioneering in 1912

Vedrines was politically active and in 1912 he stood unsuccessfully as a Socialist candidate for the Chamber of Deputies for the constituency of Limoux. He also made an early use of an aircraft for propaganda purposes, dropping leaflets demanding more aircraft for the French Army over the Chamber of Deputies in Paris in January 1912.

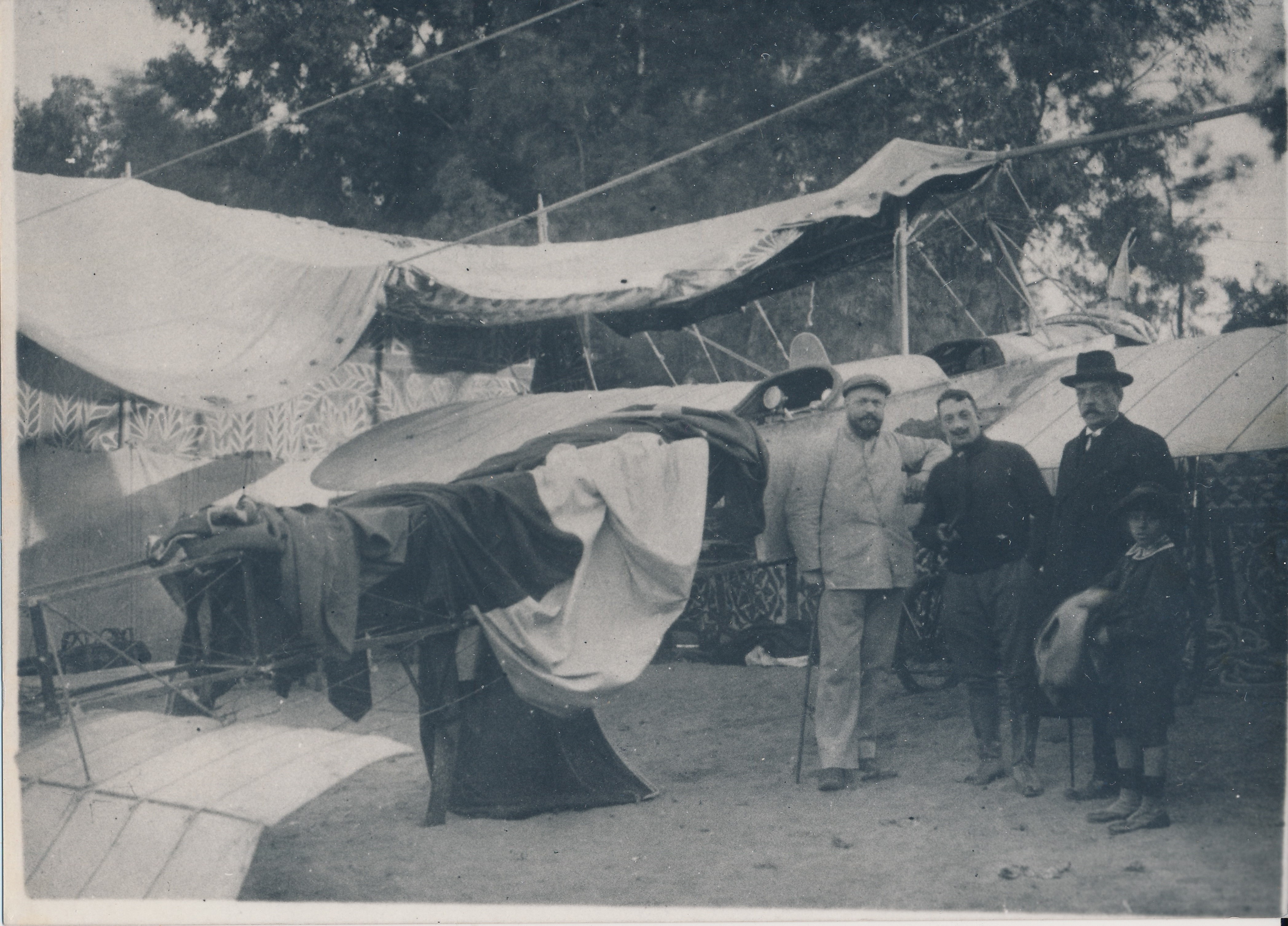
Védrines in Cairo with the French journalist Clause Arsène ("Jules") Munier in January 1914.

In 1913 he flew from Paris to Cairo in a Blériot monoplane. The flight was attended by controversy at both its beginning and its end.

On arrival at Nancy he was prevented from proceeding, since it was rightly thought that it was his intention to violate German airspace. This was a controversial issue at the time: aviators were pressing for the freedom to fly anywhere without regard to national boundaries. Védrines' action helped to bring about a conference on the matter which was held the following year.

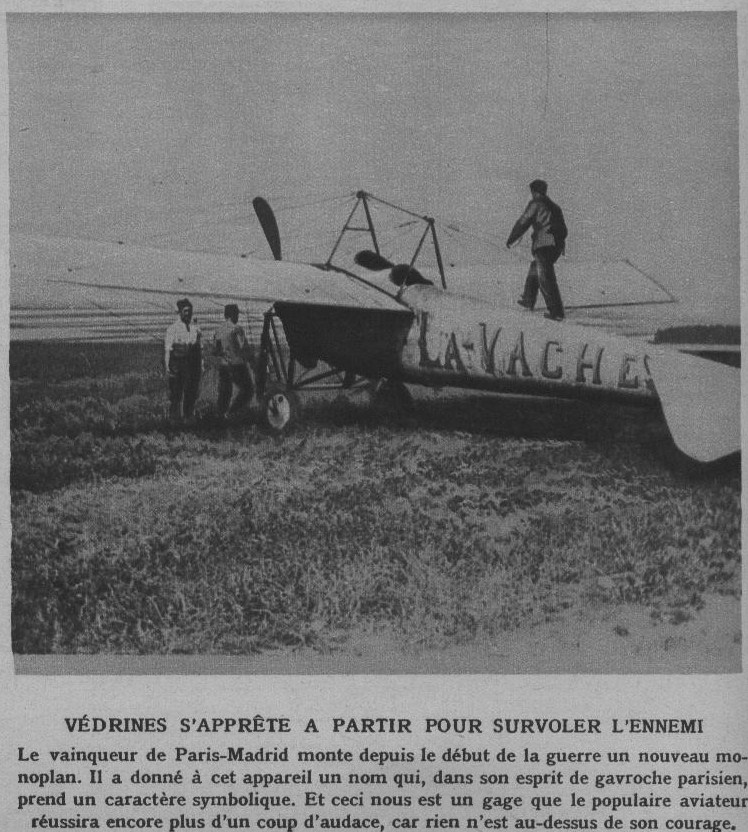
Védrines and his Blériot XXXVIbis La Vache, 31 August 1914

After a long delay in Nancy, on 20 November Védrines circumvented the ban by the transparent ruse of heading west on taking off from Nancy, changing course for Prague when out of sight of the airfield. He was tried in absentia for this by the Germans and sentenced to a year's imprisonment. After Prague he proceeded via Sofia, Constantinople (where he pleased the Sultan by dropping a Turkish flag on the Imperial palace), reaching Beirut on 25 December, Jaffa on 27 December, and Heliopolis on 29 December. At Heliopolis he landed at the polo ground at and was greeted by a representative of the Khedive and by the French Agent, who placed a laurel wreath bound with a tricolour around his neck. Shortly after his arrival, he became involved in a dispute with Henri Roux, who had been a passenger in a rival attempt to fly to Cairo. A refusal to retract an accusation of unpatriotic behaviour led to Védrines being challenged to a duel, which he refused, saying he was not brave enough. An attempt by René Quinton, president of the French Ligue Aérienne, to resolve the matter by asking Védrines to fight or leave Cairo merely resulted in Védrines returning to Paris and challenging Quinton to a duel in Roux's place, Vedrines desiring to fight with French Army revolvers at ten paces. The affair made headlines in the Parisian press for several weeks, but experts in duelling protocol eventually decided that there was no cause for attempted bloodshed.

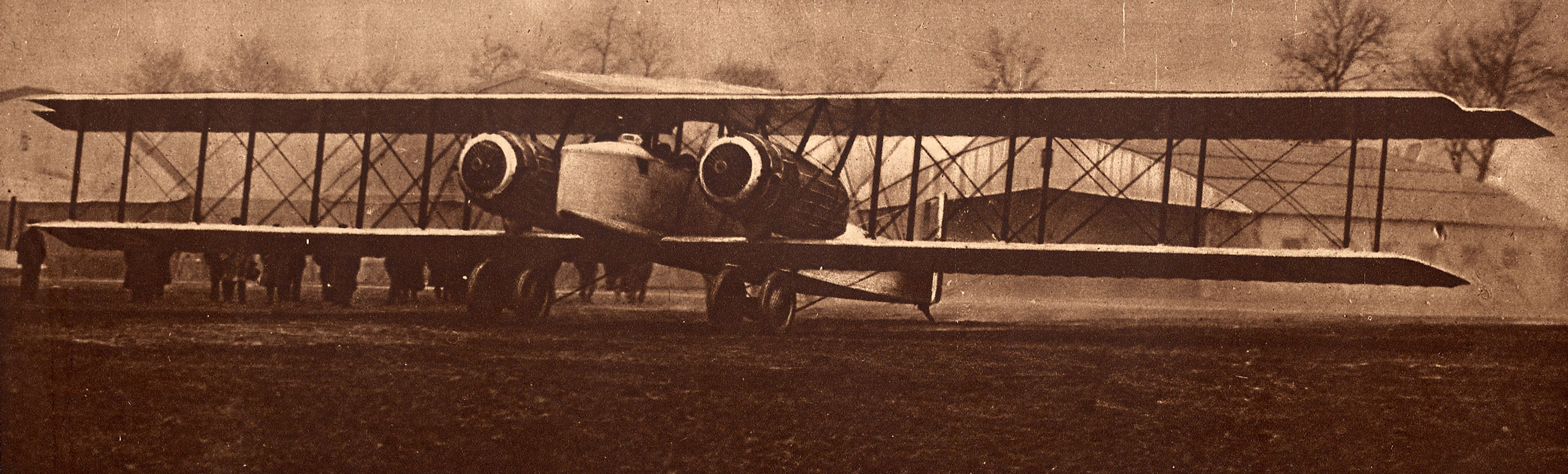
Jules Védrines and his mechanic taking off for the last time in 1919.

During the First World War he was largely involved in clandestine missions, landing behind enemy lines to drop or pick up agents. His Blériot XXXVIbis aircraft was named La Vache (The Cow) and was emblazoned with a picture of a cow, in homage to his family's roots in the Limousin region. On 15 July 1915 he was mentioned in the French Army Order of the Day for his work with the Sixth Army, for whom he had flown over 1,000 hours on reconnaissance missions.

On 19 January 1919 he succeeded in landing a Caudron G.3 on the 28 metres (92 ft) by 12 metres (39 ft) roof of the Galeries Lafayette department store in Paris, winning a 25,000 franc prize which had been offered before the war. His feat was considered a success despite a hard landing which seriously damaged the aircraft and injured Védrines. After his death a stone commemorating the achievement was placed there.

Three months later, on 21 April 1919, he was killed when attempting to fly a Caudron C.23 from Villacoublay to Rome, Italy. After an engine failed he attempted a forced landing, but crashed near St Rambert d'Albon near Lyon killing himself and his mechanic, Marcel Guillain.
