= George Bertram Cockburn =

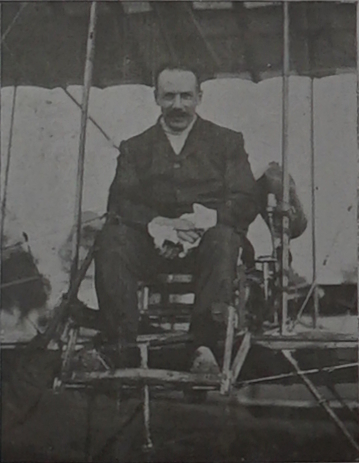
- 1911, Rheims.
- Born: 8 January 1872; Birkenhead, Cheshire, England
- Died: 25 February 1931 (aged 59); Whitchurch, Hampshire, England
- Occupations: Research chemist aviator
- Known for: Aviation Pioneer

George Bertram Cockburn OBE (8 January 1872 – 25 February 1931) was a research chemist who became an aviation pioneer. He represented Great Britain in the first international air race at Rheims and co-founded the first aerodrome for the army at Larkhill. He also trained the first four pilots of what was to become the Fleet Air Arm. During World War I he worked as a Government Inspector of Aeroplanes for the Royal Flying Corps at Farnborough and subsequently became Head of the Accidents Branch of the Department of the Controller-General of Civil Aviation at the Air Ministry.

== Early life ==
Bertram Cockburn was the youngest child of George Cockburn, a Liverpool provisions merchant, and his second wife Katherine Jessie Stitt (née Bertram). Both his parents having previously been widowed, he had four older half siblings from his parents' first marriages – John Scott Cockburn, Ada Cockburn, Mary Cockburn and Katie Stitt. The family lived across the River Mersey at Lingdale Lodge, Shrewsbury Road in Oxton, Birkenhead. Several earlier generations of the Cockburn family had lived in Inveresk south east of Edinburgh. However, George Cockburn (Senior), who had travelled south to seek his fortune, had become sufficiently prosperous to be able to send both his sons to be educated at fee paying schools in Scotland. John, who became a Presbyterian minister, attended Edinburgh Academy then Glasgow University and George (Junior) was sent to Loretto School in Musselburgh from 1887 until 1892. In October 1892 Bertram Cockburn entered New College, Oxford to read Natural Sciences specialising in Chemistry. He graduated in 1895.

== Career ==
=== Research chemist ===
On leaving Oxford he went to the Chemistry Laboratory of St George's Hospital in London to work with John Addyman Gardner on the study of fenchones. Between 1897 and 1898 they jointly published four papers in the Journal of the Chemical Society. In 1899 Bertram Cockburn published a fifth paper on fencholenic acids independently of Gardner. By this time, he had received his BSc.

His father died in 1893 while he was at Oxford and, by 1901, he had returned to Birkenhead to live with his widowed mother and unmarried sister Mary. Following the death of his mother in 1903, they sold the family home and moved to Taynton in Gloucestershire.

=== Pioneer aviator ===
In February 1909 Bertram Cockburn was elected to membership of the Royal Aero Club and, later that year, travelled to France to become the first pupil in Henri Farman's flying school at Châlons-sur-Marne. He made his first flight in June of that year and took part in the Grande Semaine d'Aviation at Rheims in August. He represented Great Britain in the competition for the Gordon Bennett Cup but unfortunately crashed into a haystack and was unable to complete the course.

He returned to Britain with a Farman III biplane and, on 26 April the following year, he received Royal Aero Club certificate number 5. By this time he was resident at St Mary Bourne near Andover, Hampshire. In June 1910, he won a prize of £100 in the 'Quick Starting' Competition at the Wolverhampton Air Meet . Although he actively promoted air races as an incentive to develop improvements in aircraft performance, he never flew competitively again following the death of his friend Charles Rolls at Bournemouth. In 1912 he became a founder member of the Royal Aero Club's Public Safety and Accidents Investigation Committee.

=== Trainer of Pilots ===
On returning from France, Bertram Cockburn devoted himself to the training of other pilots. He obtained permission from the army to rent a shed at Larkhill adjacent to Salisbury Plain. From here he and other aviators gave private instruction in flying to army officers. By 1910, he and Captain JBD Fulton had founded the first aerodrome for the army. In 1911, following the death of Cecil Grace in a flying accident, he volunteered to train the first four naval pilots at Eastchurch on the Isle of Sheppey. This he did free of charge while lodging with Maurice Egerton after which he returned to Larkhill.

=== Aircraft Inspector ===
In 1913, as war approached, Bertram Cockburn resigned his Fellowship of the Chemical Society and in 1914 was appointed to be an Inspector of Aeroplanes for the Aeronautical Inspection Directorate (AID) of the Royal Flying Corps at Farnborough. In the 1918 New Year Honours, he was awarded an OBE for his services.

Shortly afterwards, he became Head of the newly established Accidents Branch of the Department of the Controller-General of Civil Aviation, Air Ministry.

== Family ==
On 12 February 1913 he married Lilian Woodhouse, daughter of a sugar broker. They had one daughter, Joan, who was born in 1914. He died at Larksborough near Whitchurch in Hampshire in 1931, aged 59.
