= Nieuport II =

French pre-WW1 racing aircraft

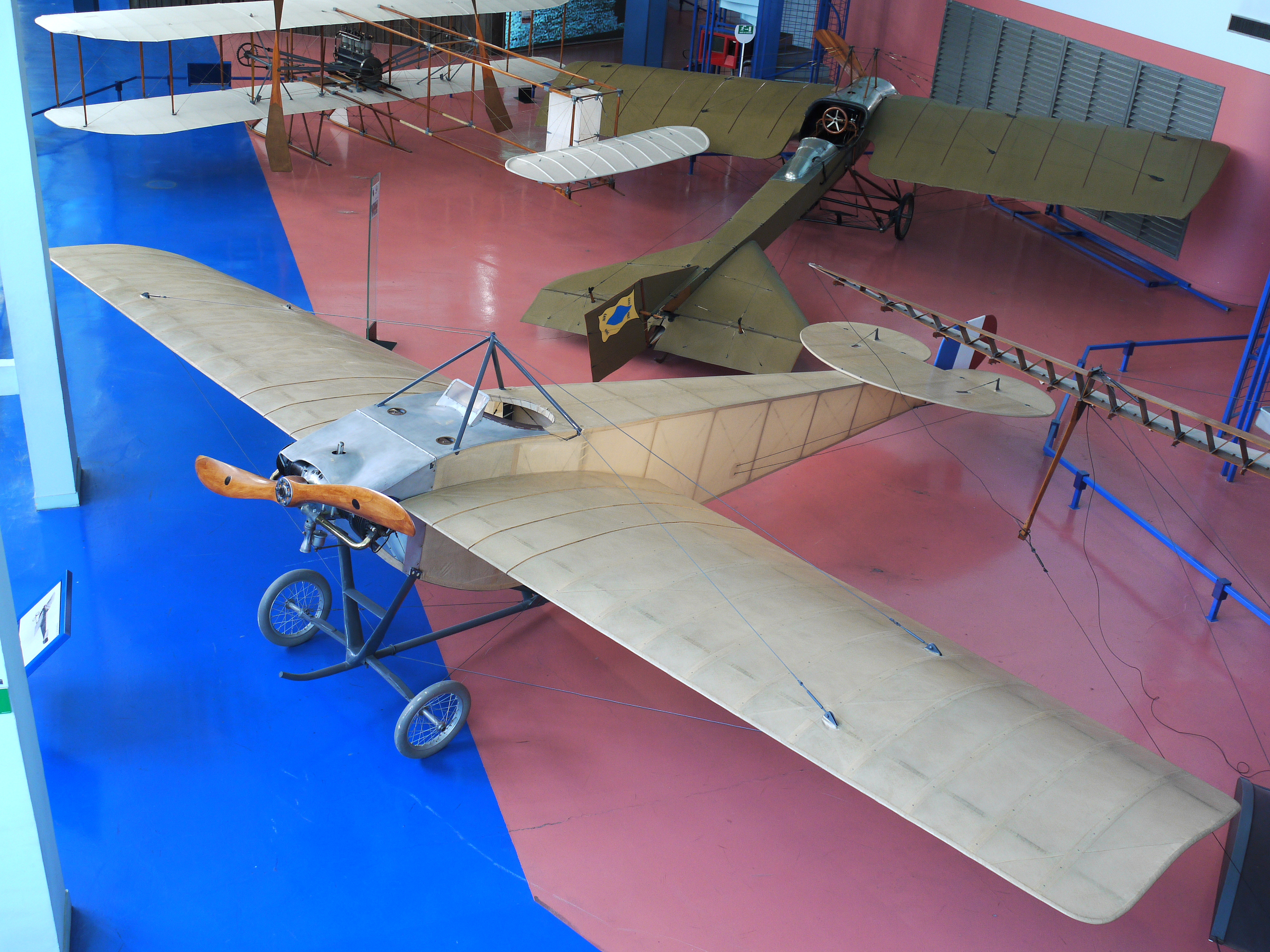
- Surviving late production Nieuport II.N at the Musée de l'Air et de l'Espace

General information
- Type: Sport aircraft/Racer
- National origin: France
- Manufacturer: Nieuport

History
- Manufactured: 1910-1914
- First flight: 1910

The Nieuport II was a mid-wing monoplane racing or sport aircraft built by the Société Anonyme des Établissements Nieuport between 1910 and 1914 and was noted for its high performance using a small twin-cylinder engine, and winning many races, primarily in France before being used as a trainer during World War I by French flying schools.

== Background ==
Édouard Nieuport was the owner of a small company which produced spark plugs and magnetos for the automobile industry, and he became involved with aviation through working on the electrical equipment of Henri Farman's Voisin biplane. In 1908 he started constructing his first aircraft, a small monoplane powered by a 20 hp (15 kW) Darracq engine and succeeded in making some brief straight-line flights in it during 1909, but the aircraft, along with many others, was destroyed in the floods which struck Paris in January 1910.

== Development and design ==
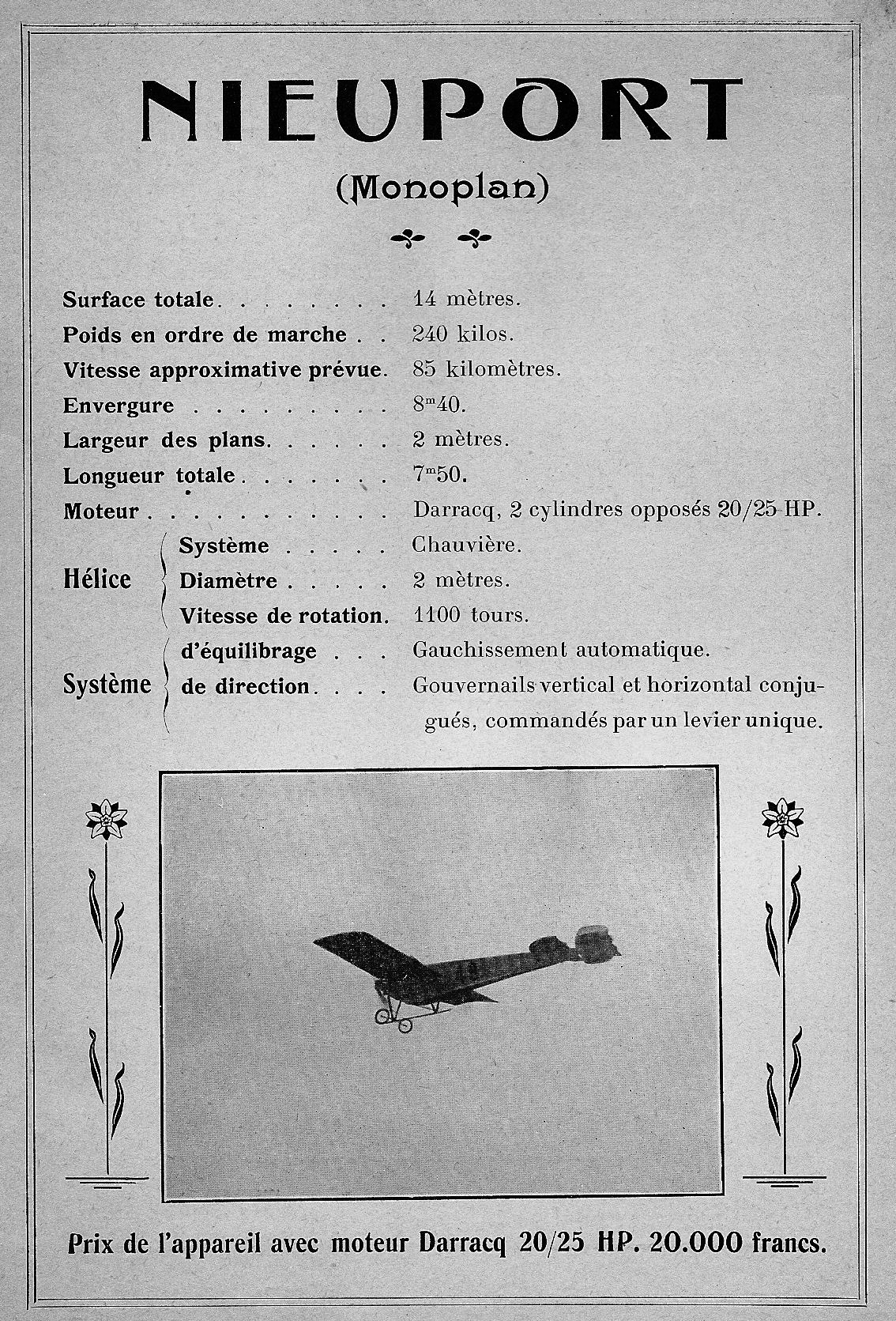
Catalogue page for Nieuport II showing earliest form with all flying tail

The Nieuport II was the subject of extensive research carried out by the Nieuport brothers in conjunction with the Eiffel Laboratories and benefited from input from Robert Esnault-Pelterie, who had designed his own low-drag monoplane. The result was a wire-braced monoplane with only a single pair of bracing wires on each side, supplemented with a single pair of control wires to warp the wings for lateral control. The airfoil section was unusual in having a fairly thick (for the period), but sharp leading edge, with the undersides rising up to thin the airfoil out over the majority of the chord. The upper wires led to a pyramidal cabane and the pilot was nearly fully enclosed in the fuselage, with only his head exposed. Initially the undercarriage consisted of a single central skid attached to the fuselage by two inverted V struts, bearing a transverse leaf spring with a wheel on each end. When first flown the tail surfaces consisted of a semicircular horizontal stabiliser mounted on top of the rear of the fuselage, behind which was a universally jointed assembly combining a rectangular elevator with a pair of rudders. The controls used the joystick to provide yaw (rudder) and pitch (elevator) control, while foot pedals operated the wing warping for lateral control, the pedals moving a torque tube which ran diagonally backwards to the rear V-strut of the undercarriage, where the warping wires were attached.

Late examples were available with the modern arrangement as a factory option, using the pedals to control the rudder, as was used on the contemporary Blériot and Deperdussin aircraft. A variety of engines were used, starting with the Darracq, which, despite being developed specifically for Nieuport, proved unsatisfactory, and a variety of engines were tried before the Nieuport brothers developed their own twin-cylinder, horizontally opposed engine.

== Operational history ==
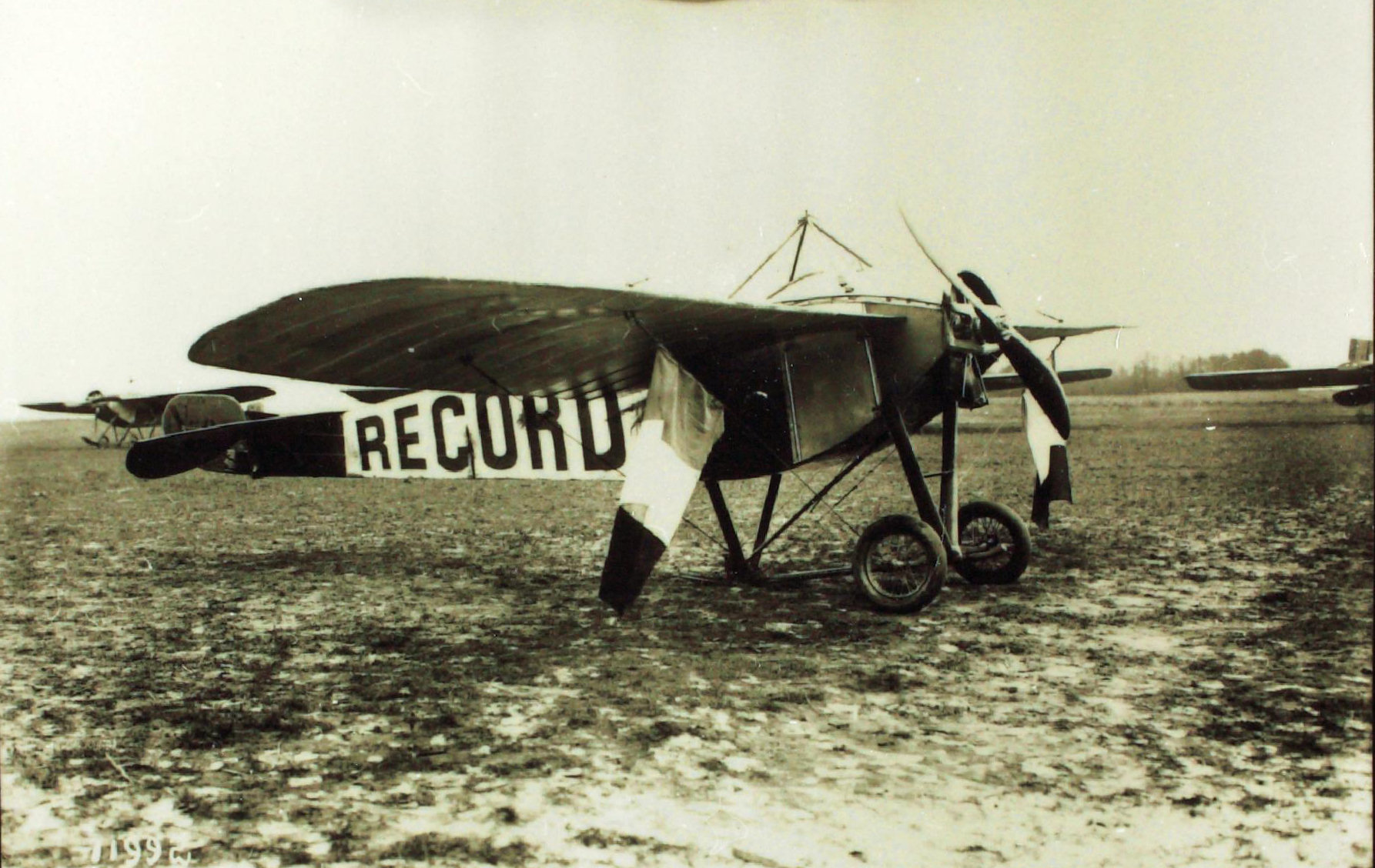
Nieuport II.G monoplane in which Emmanuel Helen won the Michelin Cup

On 11 May Nieuport succeeded in breaking the world speed record for all distances up to 100 km flying a Nieuport II powered by a 28 hp (21 kW) Nieuport engine. His highest recorded speed was 119.63 km/h (74.33 mph)

Three were flown in the 1911 Gordon Bennett Trophy at Eastchurch: one, flown by Charles Weymann and powered by a 100 hp (75 kW) Gnome double Omega, won the competition with a speed of 126.67 km/h (78.71 mph); a second, powered by a 70 hp (52 kW) Gnome Lambda and flown by Edouard Nieuport, placed third: the third, flown by M Chevalier and powered by a 28 hp (21 kW) Nieuport engine, failed to finish.

== Variants ==
II.D
18 hp twin-cylinder horizontally opposed Darraq 25hp O-2 engine
II.A
40 hp fan type Anzani engine
II.G
Gnome rotary engines, of 50, 70 or 100 hp
II.N
28 hp twin-cylinder horizontally opposed Nieuport engine.
II.H
Floatplane variant (offered but not built)

== Operators ==
Most examples were used by individuals, however a small number were purchased by military air arms including:

Argentina

- Argentine Air Force

France

- Aéronautique Militaire
- Used for flight training, including as a flightless ground trainer commonly known as a Penguin.

(Thailand) Siam

- Royal Siamese Air Service
- First aircraft of Royal Siamese Air Force

== Survivors and replicas ==
- late-production Nieuport II.N at the Musée de l'Air et de l'Espace, Le Bourget near Paris
- A taxi-able replica is at Old Rhinebeck Aerodrome in Red Hook, New York state

== Specifications (28 hp Nieuport engine) ==
Data from "Nieuport II N".

General characteristics

- Crew: one
- Length: 7.15 m (23 ft 5 in)
- Wingspan: 8.65 m (28 ft 5 in)
- Height: 2.60 m (8 ft 6 in)
- Wing area: 14 m^{2} (150 sq ft)
- Empty weight: 240 kg (529 lb)
- Gross weight: 340 kg (750 lb)
- Powerplant: 1 × Nieuport 2-cylinder Horizontally opposed air-cooled, 21 kW (28 hp)
- Propellers: 2-bladed

Performance

- Maximum speed: 115 km/h (71 mph, 62 kn)

== See also ==
Related development

- Nieuport III
- Nieuport IV

Aircraft of comparable role, configuration, and era

- Hanriot D.I
- Morane-Saulnier H

Related lists

- List of fatalities from aviation accidents
