= Eugène Lefebvre =

French pioneering aviator (1878–1909)

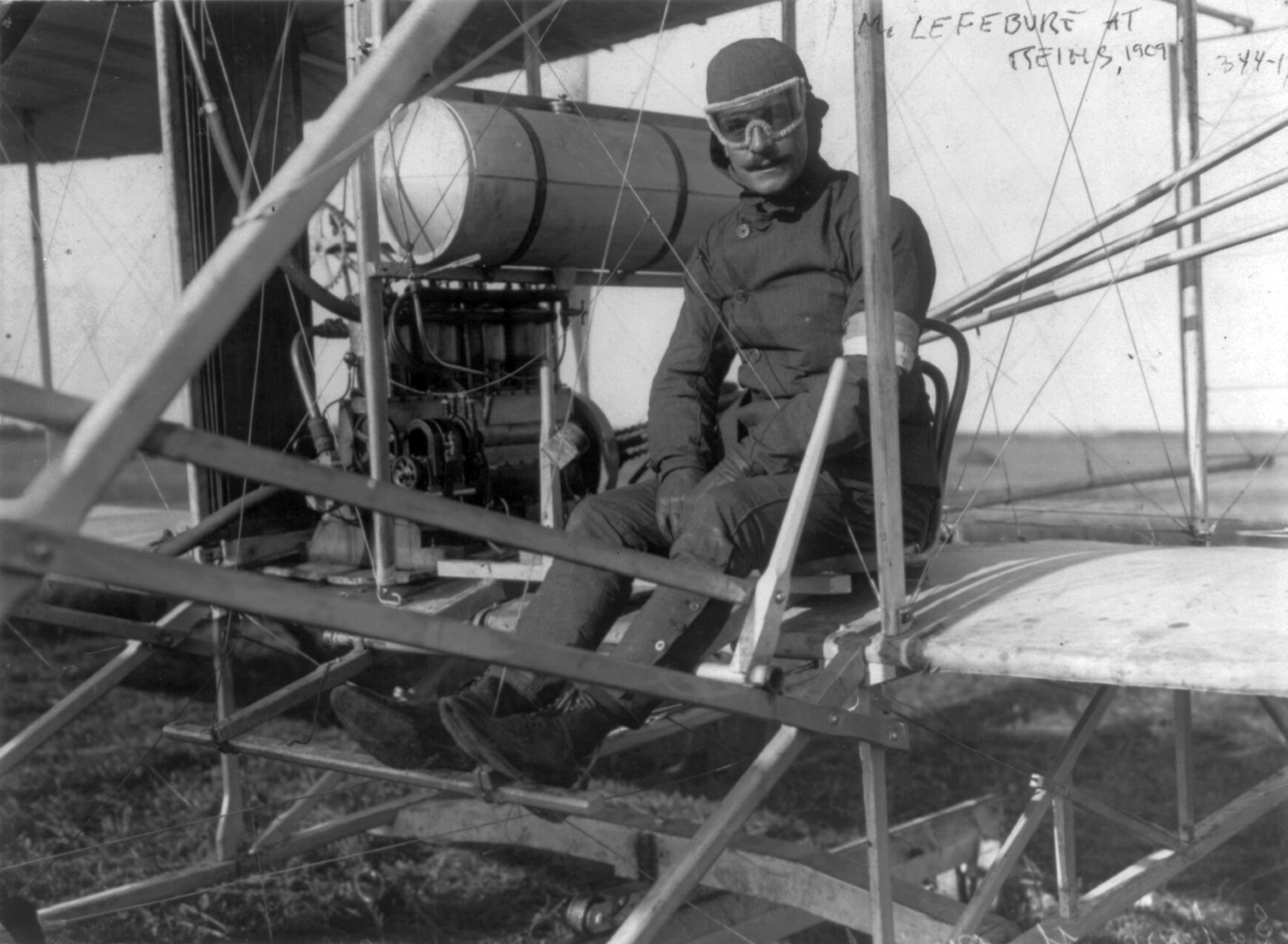
- Lefebvre in his Wright Flyer at Reims in 1909
- Born: 4 October 1878; Corbie, France
- Died: 7 September 1909 (aged 30); Juvisy-sur-Orge, France
- Cause of death: Aircrash
- Occupation: Aviator

Eugène Lefebvre (4 October 1878 – 7 September 1909) was a French aviation pioneer. He was reportedly the first stunt pilot, the first person to die while piloting a powered airplane, and the second person to be killed in a powered airplane crash.

== Biography ==
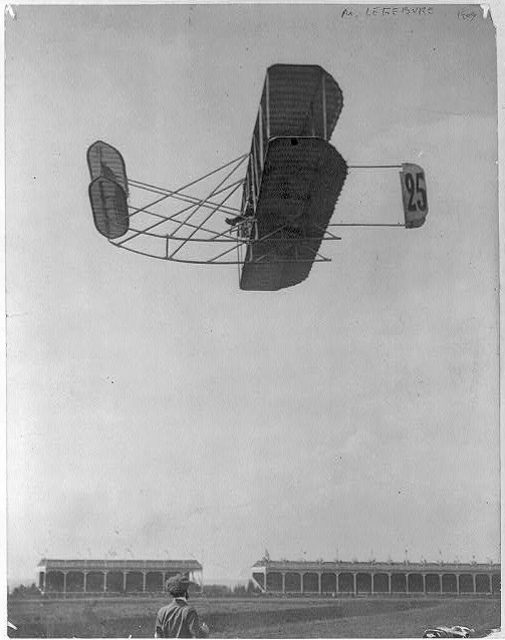
Eugène Lefebvre at Grande Semaine d'Aviation de la Champagne, Reims (September 1909)

The chief pilot for the French Wright Company, Lefebvre was a participant in the first international air race, the Grande Semaine d'Aviation at Reims in 1909, piloting a Wright Flyer. He, Louis Blériot and Hubert Latham were selected as France's representatives during the contest for the Gordon Bennett Trophy on 22 August, after poor weather made the morning's planned qualifying run impossible. When the weather lifted around 6 o'clock that evening, Lefebvre was one of the pilots who took to the sky in an exhibition, giving one of the earliest displays of stunt flying. The New York Times described his maneuvers thus: "Lefebvre...came driving at the crowded tribunes, turned in the nick of time, went sailing off, swooped down again till he made the flags on the pillars and the plumes on the ladies' hats flutter, and so played about at will for our applause." He was subsequently fined $4 by the judges for displaying excessive "recklessness and daring." During the running of the race, he placed fourth, behind Glenn Curtiss, Blériot and Latham.

Only nine days after the end of the Reims event, Lefebvre was killed in a crash at Port-Aviation (often called "Juvisy Airfield") at Viry-Châtillon when the plane he was testing dropped to the ground from a height of 6 metres (20 ft). In doing so, he became the first person to die while piloting a powered airplane, and the second person to be killed in an airplane crash.

== Legacy ==
Lefebvre is a distant relative of the later film actress Capucine (1928-1990).

== See also ==
- List of fatalities from aviation accidents
