= Deperdussin 1912 Racing Monoplane =

1900s French racing aircraft

General information
- Type: Racing aircraft
- National origin: France
- Manufacturer: Société de Production des Aéroplanes Deperdussin
- Designer: Louis Béchereau

History
- First flight: late 1911/early 1912

The Deperdussin 1912 Racing Monoplane was a French aircraft built by Société de Production des Aéroplanes Deperdussin especially for racing. It is notable for being the first aircraft to exceed 100 mph (161 km/h) in level flight.

== Design and development ==
The Deperdussin 1912 Racer, was a high-wing monoplane with wings which were tapered so that their chord was greater at the tips (1.60 m wide) than at the root (1.30 m wide), this producing better wing-warping for lateral control. The fuselage consisted of a wooden box-girder entirely skinned with plywood, with the rounded top and bottom built up from laminations of wood.

It was powered by a 100 hp (75 kW) Gnome double Omega 14-cylinder twin-row rotary engine .

It was first flown late in 1911 or early in 1912; Jules Védrines is recorded as making "fast flights" in the aircraft on 2 January 1912. A number of record-breaking flights followed, and on 22 February Védrines succeeded in flying it at over 100 mph (160 km/h), flying a distance of 200 km (120 mi) in 1 h 15 min 20.8 s, an average speed of 169 km/h (105 mph) By this time the engine had been replaced by the more powerful 140 hp (100 kW) Gnome double Lambda engine.

It is probable that this aircraft was the one being flown by Védrines when he crashed at Épinay on 29 April during an attempt to fly from Brussels to Madrid in a single day.

== Specifications (first example) ==
Data from Flight International

General characteristics

- Crew: 1
- Length: 7.0 m (23 ft)
- Wingspan: 6.25 m (20 ft 6 in)
- Height: 2.30 m (7 ft 7 in)
- Wing area: 9.3 m^{2} (100 sq ft)
- Powerplant: 1 × Gnome Lambda Lambda 14-cylinder twin-row air-cooled rotary, 100 kW (140 hp)
- Propellers: 2-bladed Chauvière, 2.50 m (8 ft 2 in) diameter

Performance

- Maximum speed: 169 km/h (105 mph, 91 kn) (speed measured flying a circuit)
