= Eugène Gilbert =

French aviator (1889–1918)

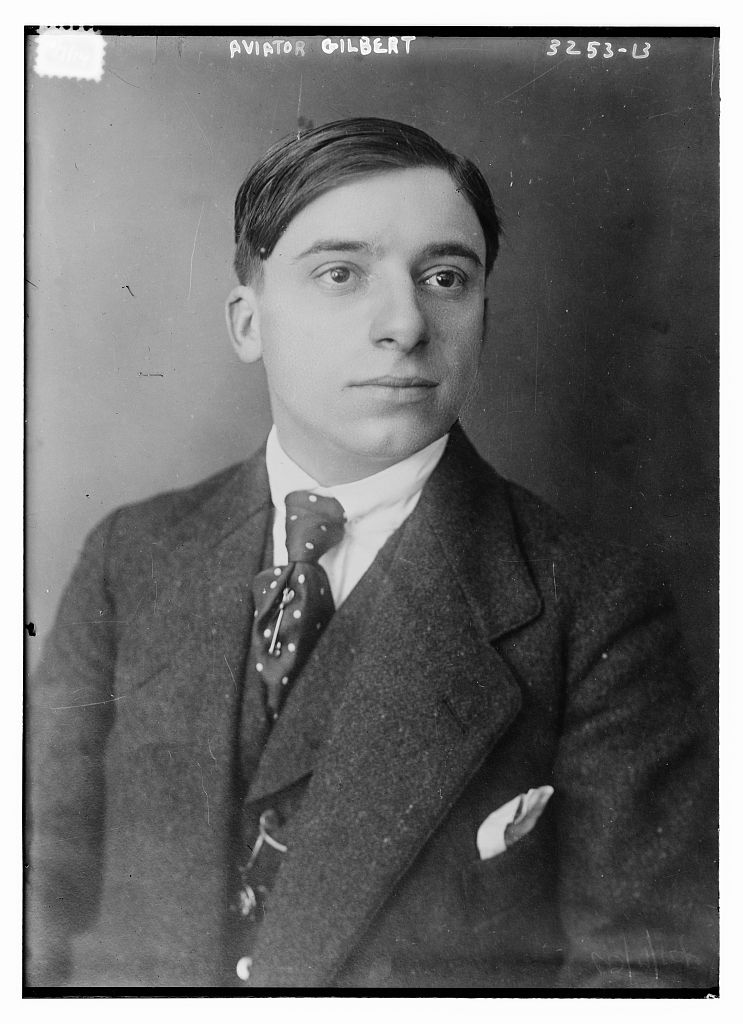
- Born: 19 July 1889; Riom, France
- Died: 17 May 1918 (aged 28); Villacoublay, France
- Military career
- Unit: MS37, MS23, MS49
- Awards: Légion d'honneur, Médaille militaire, Croix de Guerre

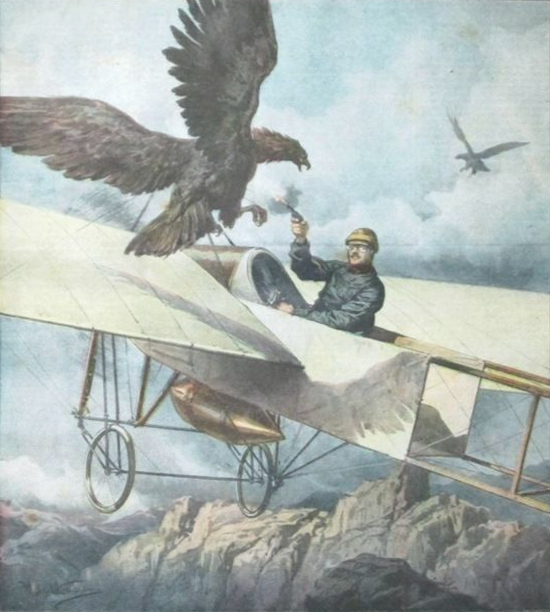
Painting of Gilbert's 1911 encounter with an eagle over Pyrenees.

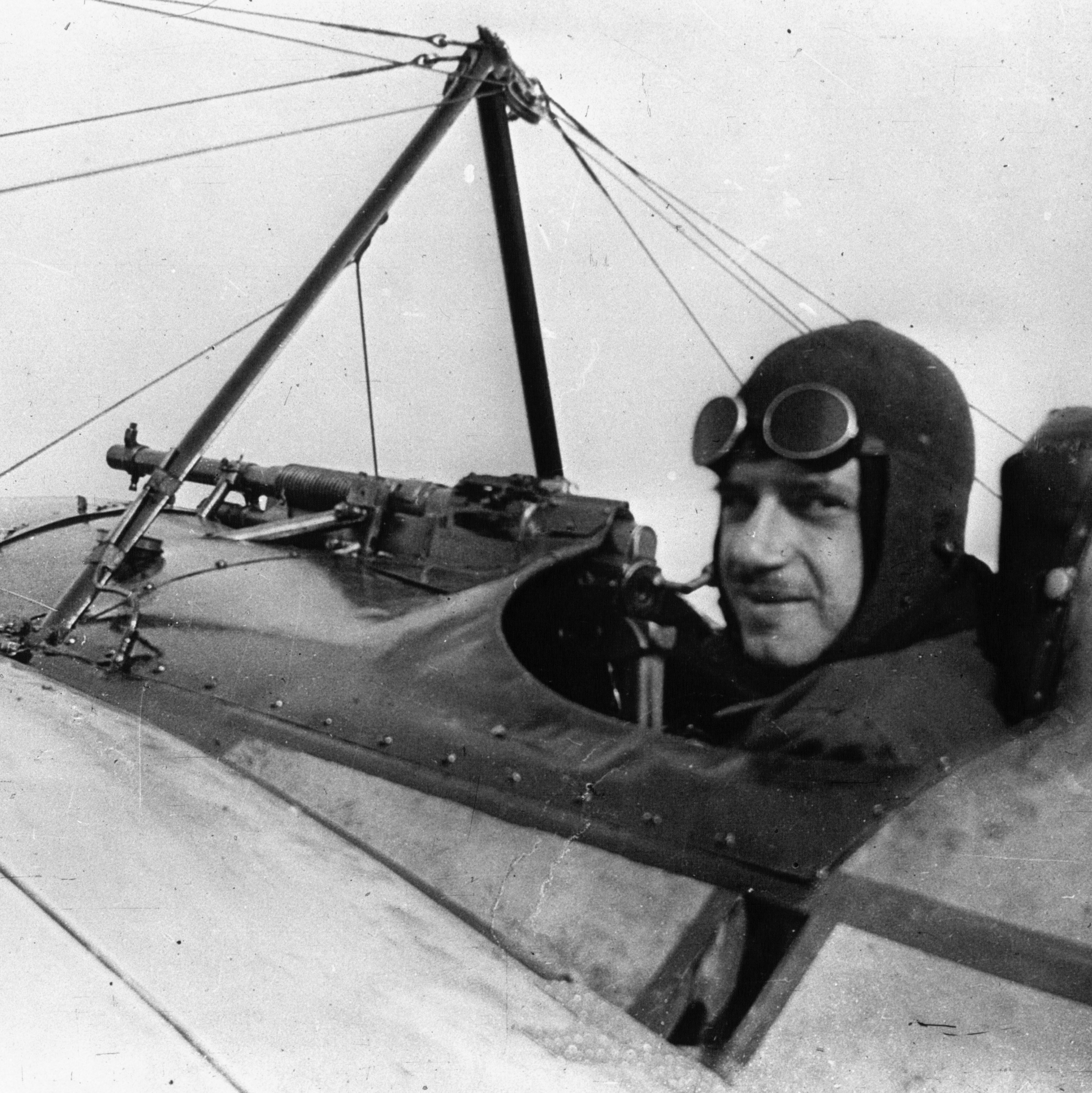
Eugène Gilbert in the cockpit during WW1, 1915.

Sous Lieutenant Eugène Gilbert (19 July 1889 – 17 May 1918) was a World War I flying ace credited with five aerial victories. He had also been a famous pioneer pre-war racing pilot, flying in many countries throughout Europe.

== Biography ==
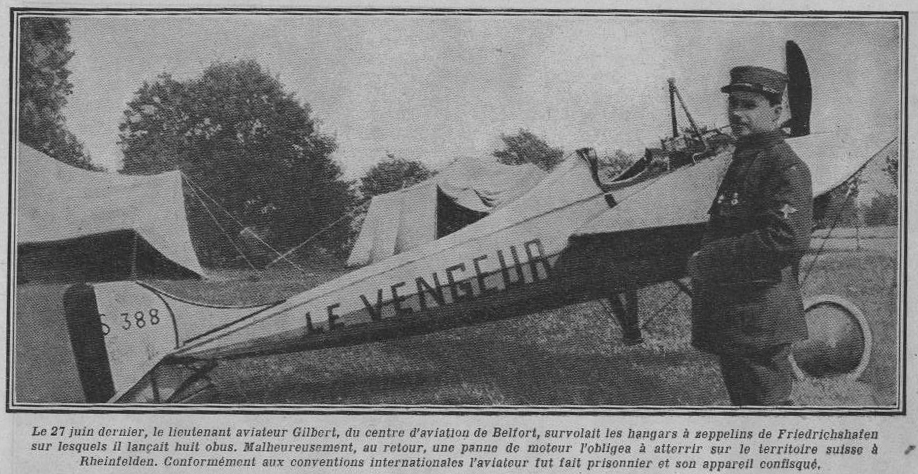
Gilbert with Morane-Saulnier combat monoplane during WW1

Gilbert was born on 19 July 1889 in Riom, France. His mother, Henriette Françoise Gilbert was the daughter of a public works contractor; his father is unknown. He became interested in flight in his teens and attempted to build his own version of a flying machine around 1909. The effort appears to have been unsuccessful. That same year he entered the Bleriot flight school in Étampes, gaining his pilot's license on 24 September 1910.

In 1911 Gilbert was called up for military service and with only eight flying lessons made a corporal-aviator. He was forced to leave the army after six months of service following a serious accident during a maneuver, and launched himself at once in sporting competitions where he quickly distinguished himself, flying a Bleriot XI.

In the 1911 Paris to Madrid air race, Gilbert flew across the Pyrenees and was attacked by an angry mother eagle defending her young and nest; to ward off the large bird, he simply fired pistol shots at it rather than kill it.

In 1912 Gilbert organized an aviation festival with Dr. Antoine Dorel, president of the Automobile Club d'Auvergne. The newspaper Airline Journal reported that flying over Brioude, Gilbert was shot at by an eighty-three year old farmer who took him for "Baret Lou", a demonic bird of prey that casts a curse on crops. Gilbert responded by dropping pamphlets for an advertising campaign "Our future is in the Air" organized by the Michelin firm to promote the military use of aviation. These the farmer interpreted to be feathers of the bird raining down.

On 24 April 1913 Gilbert made a record nonstop cross-country flight of 826 km (523 miles) from Villacoublay, France, to Vitoria-Gasteiz, Spain, in 8 hours 23 minutes. In June 1914 he won the International Michelin Cup completing a 2,970 km (1,850 mi) circuit of France in 39h 35m including stoppages.

By 1915, Gilbert was in uniform as a combat pilot with Escadrille MS23. Like fellow French pre-war pilot Adolphe Pégoud, Gilbert was one of the first pilots to become an ace, an aviator who has shot down five or more enemy aircraft. On 27 June 1915 Gilbert was interned after force landing his Morane-Saulnier fighter in Switzerland after bombing the zeppelin sheds at Friedrichshafen. He later succeeded in escaping from captivity and returning to France. He was killed on 17 May 1918 when test-flying a new aircraft at Villacoublay.

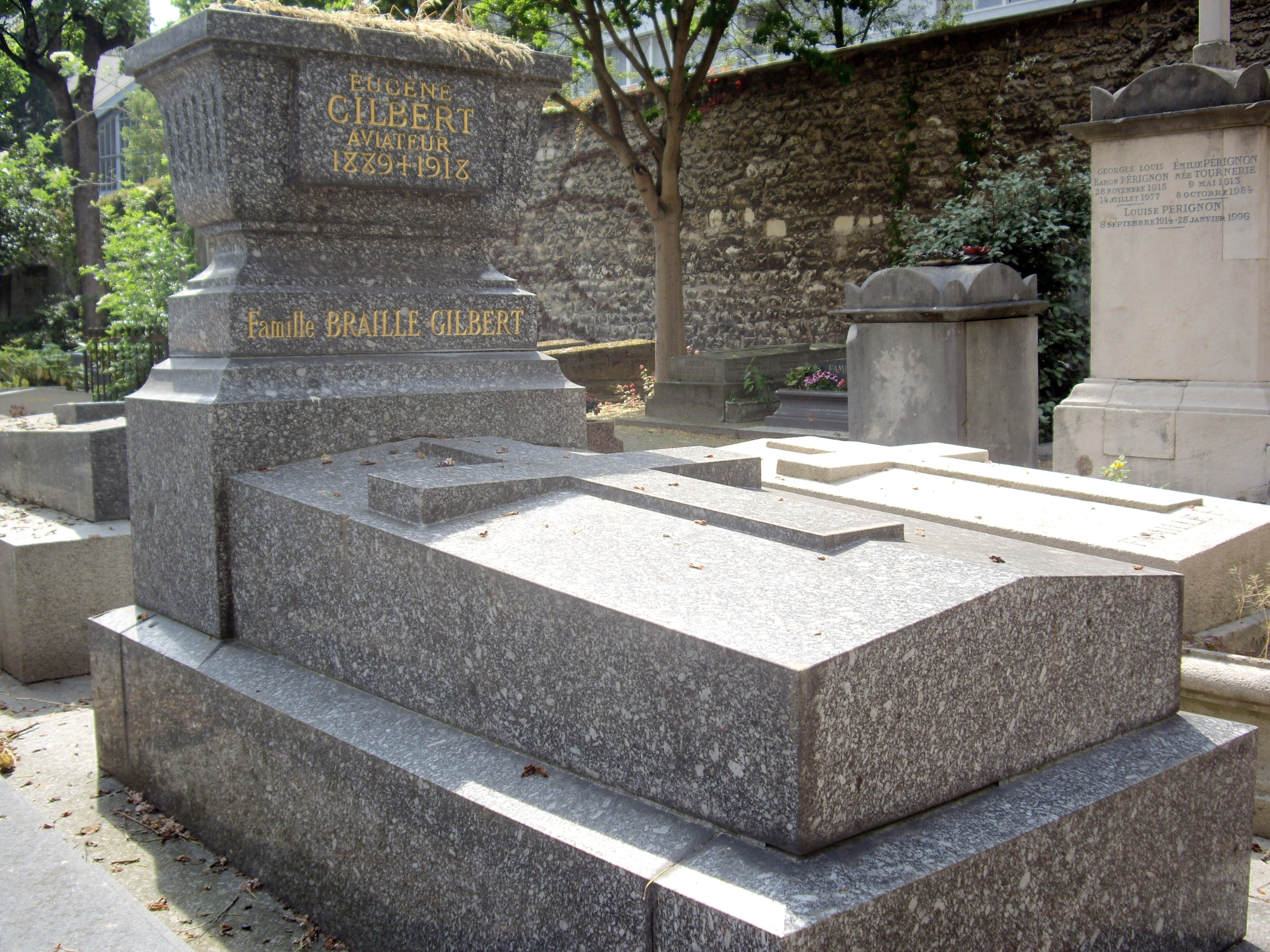
Tomb of Eugène Gilbert, Paris

Preceded by Adolphe Pégoud	Top Flying Ace; France, World War I	Succeeded by Georges Guynemer
