= Charles Terres Weymann =

Haitian aeroplane racing pilot and businessman (1889–1976)

- Weymann with his Gordon Bennett-winning Nieuport monoplane
- Born: 2 August 1889; Port-au-Prince, Haiti
- Died: August 1976 (aged 86–87); France
- Occupations: Early aviator, inventor and successful businessman

Charles Terres Weymann (2 August 1889 – 1976) was a Haitian-born early aeroplane racing pilot and businessman. During World War I he flew for Nieuport as a test pilot and was awarded the rank of Chevalier of the Legion of Honour.

== Early years ==
Weymann was born in Port-au-Prince, Haiti, on 2 August 1889 to an American father of Alsatian descent and a Haitian mother. It is said that Weymann's mother was Cornelie Miot, herself Haitian and daughter of Charles Miot and Lesinska Cecile Rivière, both Haitians. Lesinska Cecile Rivière (1829–1908), Charles's maternal grandmother, was the sister of Bienaimé "Mémé" Rivière, the richest person in Haiti at the time, who owned shipping lines among other things.

== Inventor ==
=== Fabric bodies ===
After the war Charles Weymann used his knowledge of airframe manufacture to develop a system of making fabric bodies for road vehicles. He opened factories in Paris in 1921, London in 1923 and Indianapolis in 1928. The market for these grew and Weymann licensed his system to a number of Europe's most prestigious marques.

A change of fashion in the late 1920s led to a demand for gloss painted bodies and the fabric market disappeared. A system was developed using metal panels with a similar flexible mounting allowing movement between panels. It was used on coachbuilt bodies but it did not suit the demands of mass-production.

The French factory closed in 1930 followed by Indianapolis in 1931. The British plant had turned to the manufacture of bus bodies and survived (as Metro Cammell Weymann) but Weymann resigned from the company in 1932.

=== Automatic clutch ===
He maintained his interest in developing equipment for the automotive industry. In 1963 he obtained a patent for an automatic clutch but it did not meet with commercial success.

Weymann returned to aviation with the engineer Georges Lepère and continued to design aircraft, such as the Weymann 66 and autogyros at Société des Avions C T Weymann.

== Aviation achievements ==
- He held American Aero Club pilot's license number 24, granted in 1909.
- In August 1910, he participated in the French Circuit de l'Est air competition.
- In September 1910, he attempted to win the Michelin prize by flying from Paris to Puy de Dôme (about 250 miles) with a passenger in six hours. After seven hours he set down about 10 km short of his destination, bad weather preventing further progress.
- In June 1911, he took part in the Paris-Rome air race.
- In July 1911, he took part in the Circuit d'Europé, but retired to compete in the Gordon Bennett Trophy race.
- In July 1911 he represented the US in the 3rd Gordon Bennett Trophy race at the Royal Aero Club's flying field at Eastchurch, England winning the race flying a 100 hp Gnome-engined Nieuport monoplane over the 25 six-km laps at an average speed of 78.1 mph (125.663 km/h).
- In November 1911 he flew the winning aircraft in the French Army's Reims Military Aviation Competition, 1911.
- In 1912 he won an international air race between Jersey and Saint-Malo at an average speed of 60 mph (97 km/h).
- He participated in the 1912 Hydroplane contest at Monaco, Saint-Malo (both France) and the Temse 1912 Hydroplane contests in Belgium.
- In 1913 he competed for France in the Schneider Trophy race at Monaco but was forced out by engine failure when in the lead.

== Motor racing ==
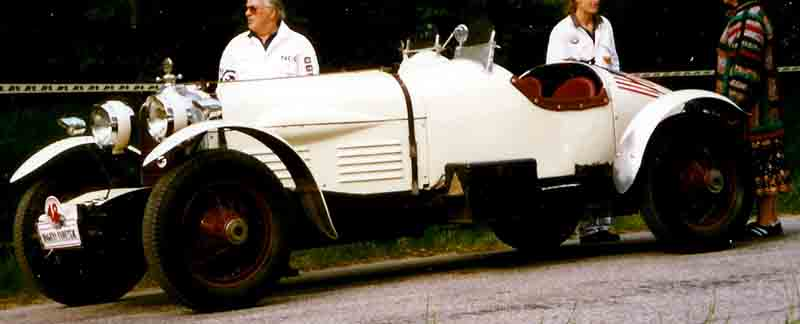
Stutz 4.9 Litre Blackhawk

Weymann brought a Stutz DV16 Blackhawk team to Le Mans 1928 and they finished second in the race – to a Bentley.
