= Antoinette (1909 monoplane) =

French monoplane of 1909

General information
- Type: Experimental aircraft
- National origin: France
- Manufacturer: Antoinette
- Designer: Léon Levavasseur

History
- First flight: 1909
- Developed from: Antoinette VII

Antoinette monoplanes were produced in series in France between 1909 and 1911. They were based on the Antoinette VII, which in turn was ultimately based on the Antoinette IV designed by Léon Levavasseur in 1908.

The aircraft produced in series after the related Antoinette VIII are not easily distinguished from each other, and examples are known were some aircraft were returned to the Antoinette factory for remanufacture with different sets of wings. Although the earlier, numbered, Antoinette aircraft had been powered by Antoinette's own V8 engine, from October 1909 onwards, the factory began to offer the ENV V8 and a 37-kilowatt (50 hp) Gnôme rotary as options. In addition to the aircraft produced in France, Albatros produced the type under license in Germany.

The total number produced is unclear today. Contemporary figures published in Jane's All the World's Aircraft put production at 50 examples in 1909 and 30 in 1910, but other sources are far more conservative. Another comtemporary source notes the highest serial number assigned by the factory as 32 by May 1910. Henri Levavasseur, the son of the designer, once stated a belief that no more than 50 had been built in total.

== Design ==
Antoinette monoplanes were a high-wing, wire-braced design of conventional layout. The fuselage was a monocoque structure, triangular in cross-section, with the pilot sitting in an open cockpit. Power was supplied by a piston engine in the nose driving a tractor propeller.

== Specifications (typical) ==
Data from The Illustrated Encyclopedia of Aircraft 1981, p.238

General characteristics

- Crew: 1 pilot
- Length: 11.50 m (37 ft 9 in)
- Wingspan: 12.80 m (42 ft 0 in)
- Wing area: 50 m^{2} (540 sq ft)
- Gross weight: 520 kg (1,146 lb)
- Powerplant: 1 × Antoinette 8V liquid-cooled, 8-cylinder V engine, 37 kW (50 hp)

Performance

- Maximum speed: 70 km/h (43 mph, 38 kn)

== Notes ==
=== Bibliography ===
- The Illustrated Encyclopedia of Aircraft. Vol. 1. London: Aerospace Publishing. 1981.
- Munson, Kenneth (1969). Pioneer Aircraft 1903–14. London: Blandford.
- Opdycke, Leonard E. (1999). French Aircraft Before the Great War. Atglen, PA: Schiffer.
