= Ferber IX =

French early experimental aircraft

III
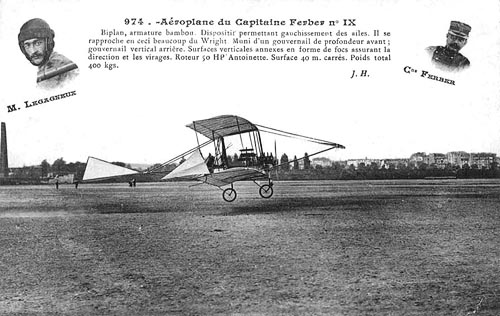

General information
- Type: Experimental aircraft
- Manufacturer: Antoinette
- Designer: Ferdinand Ferber
- Number built: 1

History
- First flight: 1908

The Antoinette III, originally called the Ferber IX or Aeroplane Ferber n° 9, (Note: in Ferber book L'aviation; ses débuts- son développement, pages 81-82) was an early experimental aircraft flown in France. It was based on Ferdinand Ferber's previous design the Ferber n°8, and was quite unlike other Antoinette aircraft. It was renamed when Ferber became a director of the Antoinette company.

The Antoinette III was a two-bay biplane without a fuselage or any other enclosure for the pilot. A single elevator was carried on outriggers ahead of the aircraft, and a fixed fin and horizontal stabiliser behind. The undercarriage was of bicycle configuration and included small outriggers near the wingtips. Power was provided by an Antoinette 8V water cooled V-8 engine driving a tractor propeller.

Between July and September 1908, Ferber made a series of progressively longer flights in the machine, the longest recorded being on 15 September when he covered 9.65 km (6.00 mi) in 9 minutes.

== Specifications ==
General characteristics

- Length: 9.5 m (31 ft 2 in)
- Wingspan: 10.5 m (34 ft 5 in)
- Powerplant: 1 × Antoinette 8V , 50 kW (67 hp)

== See also ==
- Antoinette IV
- Antoinette V
- Antoinette VI
- Antoinette VII
- Antoinette military monoplane
