= Gastambide-Mengin monoplane =

1930 experimental aircraft

Gastambide-Mengin / Antoinette II
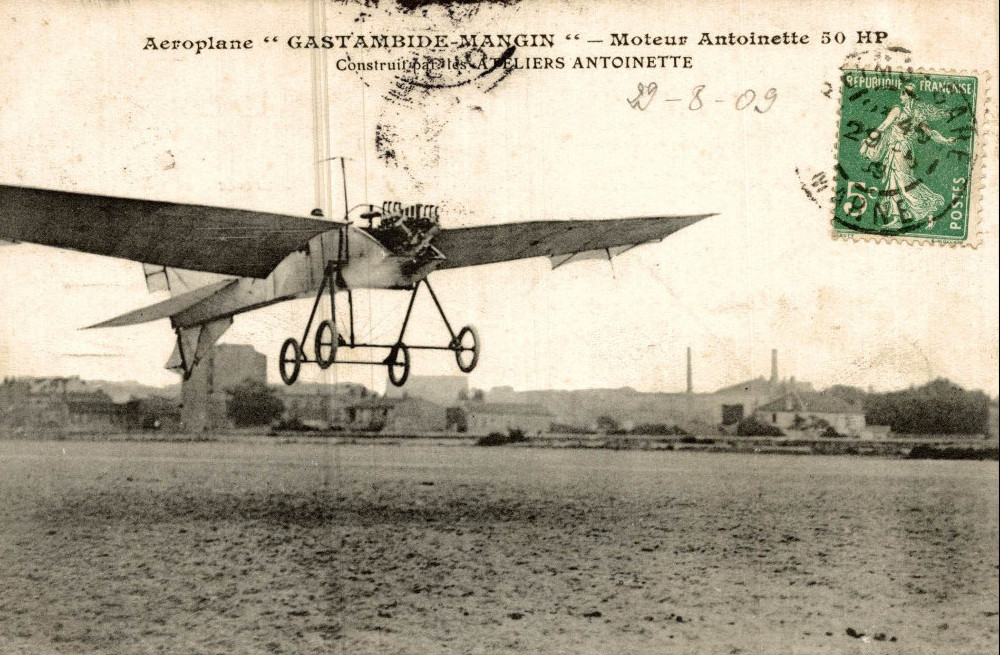

General information
- Type: Experimental monoplane
- Manufacturer: Antoinette
- Designer: Léon Levavasseur
- Number built: 1

History
- First flight: 8 February 1908

The Gastambide-Mengin monoplane (later Gastambide-Mengin I, Gastambide-Mengin II and Antoinette II) was an early French experimental aircraft designed by Léon Levavasseur, and was the first aircraft built by the Antoinette company. The name came from Jules Gastambide, who financed the company, and Gabriel Mengin, the aircraft engineer.

== Design and development ==
The monoplane (later known as the Gastambide-Mengin I) was powered by a 50 hp (37 kW) Antoinette piston engine driving a tractor propeller. It was noted for having a complex quadricycle landing gear. The monoplane made four flights between 8 and 14 February 1908 flown by a mechanic named Boyer, the furthest being a flight of 150 metres (492 ft). After these flights, the aircraft was rebuilt between February and August 1908 as the Gastambide-Mengin II (later named the Antoinette II), the modifications including revised, trailing edge-hinged triangular ailerons. The modified aircraft made three short flights in August 1908, one of these on 21 August 1908 being the first circle flown by a monoplane, and on a flight the previous day (20 August 1908) Robert Gastambide became the first passenger flown in a monoplane. With lessons learnt from the design, Levavasseur went on to design a family of monoplanes named after Antoinette Gastambide, the daughter of Jules Gastambide.

== Specifications ==
Data from

General characteristics

- Crew: one
- Length: 7.9 m (26 ft 0 in)
- Wingspan: 10 m (32 ft 10 in)
- Wing area: 24 m^{2} (258 sq ft)
- Max takeoff weight: 350 kg (772 lb)
- Powerplant: 1 × Antoinette 8V V-8 water-cooled piston engine, 37 kW (50 hp)
- Propellers: 2-bladed Levavasseur paddle bladed propeller

== See also ==
- Antoinette III
- Antoinette IV
- Antoinette V
- Antoinette VI
- Antoinette VII
- Antoinette military monoplane
- Fedor Ivanovich Bylinkin, designer of a similar aircraft, 1910

Related lists List of aircraft (pre-1914)
