= Antoinette VIII =

French experimental monoplane of 1909

General information
- Type: Experimental aircraft
- National origin: France
- Manufacturer: Antoinette
- Designer: Léon Levavasseur
- Number built: 1

History
- First flight: 15 August 1909
- Developed from: Antoinette IV

The Antoinette VIII was a French pioneering aircraft flown in 1909, a development in the series of monoplanes designed by Léon Levavasseur beginning with the Antoinette IV. It was one of a number of Antoinette designs flown at the Grande Semaine d'Aviation de la Champagne (Great Aviation Week in Champagne) in August 1909.

Relatively little is known about this aircraft today.

== Design ==
The Antoinette VIII was a high-wing, wire-braced monoplane of conventional layout. The fuselage was a monocoque structure, triangular in cross-section. The vertical tail extended above and below the horizontal stabilizer. The pilot sat in an open cockpit, and directional control was achieved by wing-warping. Power was supplied by a piston engine in the nose driving a tractor propeller. The aircraft was fitted with conventional undercarriage.

== Operational history ==
The Antoinette VIII first flew on 15 August 1909 with Antoinette test pilot Émile Ruchonette at the controls. He made a series of short flights in it that day, ending in a hard landing. Ruchonnette made a number of other flights in the aircraft during August and September. The longest of these was a flight of 16 minutes on 17 August at Mourmelon.

The aircraft competed in the Grande Semaine d'Aviation de la Champagne (Great Aviation Week in Champagne) later in August under the race number 11 but failed to win any prizes.

Another flight by Ruchonette on 6 September also ended in a hard landing, but aviation historian Charles Gibbs-Smith notes the aircraft as still flying after the end of the year.

== Specifications ==
Data from Dumas 1909, p.149

General characteristics

- Crew: 1 pilot
- Wing area: 50 m^{2} (540 sq ft)
- Gross weight: 520 kg (1,146 lb)
- Powerplant: 1 × Antoinette 8V liquid-cooled, 8-cylinder V engine, 37 kW (50 hp)

== Notes ==
=== Bibliography ===
- Dumas, Alexandre (1909). Stud Book de l'Aviation [Stud Book of Aviation] (in French). Paris: Edition du journal l'Aero.
- Gibbs-Smith, Charles H. (1966). A Directory and Nomenclature of the First Aeroplanes 1809 to 1909. London: Her Majesty's Stationery Office.
- The Illustrated Encyclopedia of Aircraft. Vol. 1. London: Aerospace Publishing. 1981.
- Munson, Kenneth (1969). Pioneer Aircraft 1903–14. London: Blandford.
- Opdycke, Leonard E. (1999). French Aircraft Before the Great War. Atglen, PA: Schiffer.
