= Antoinette III =

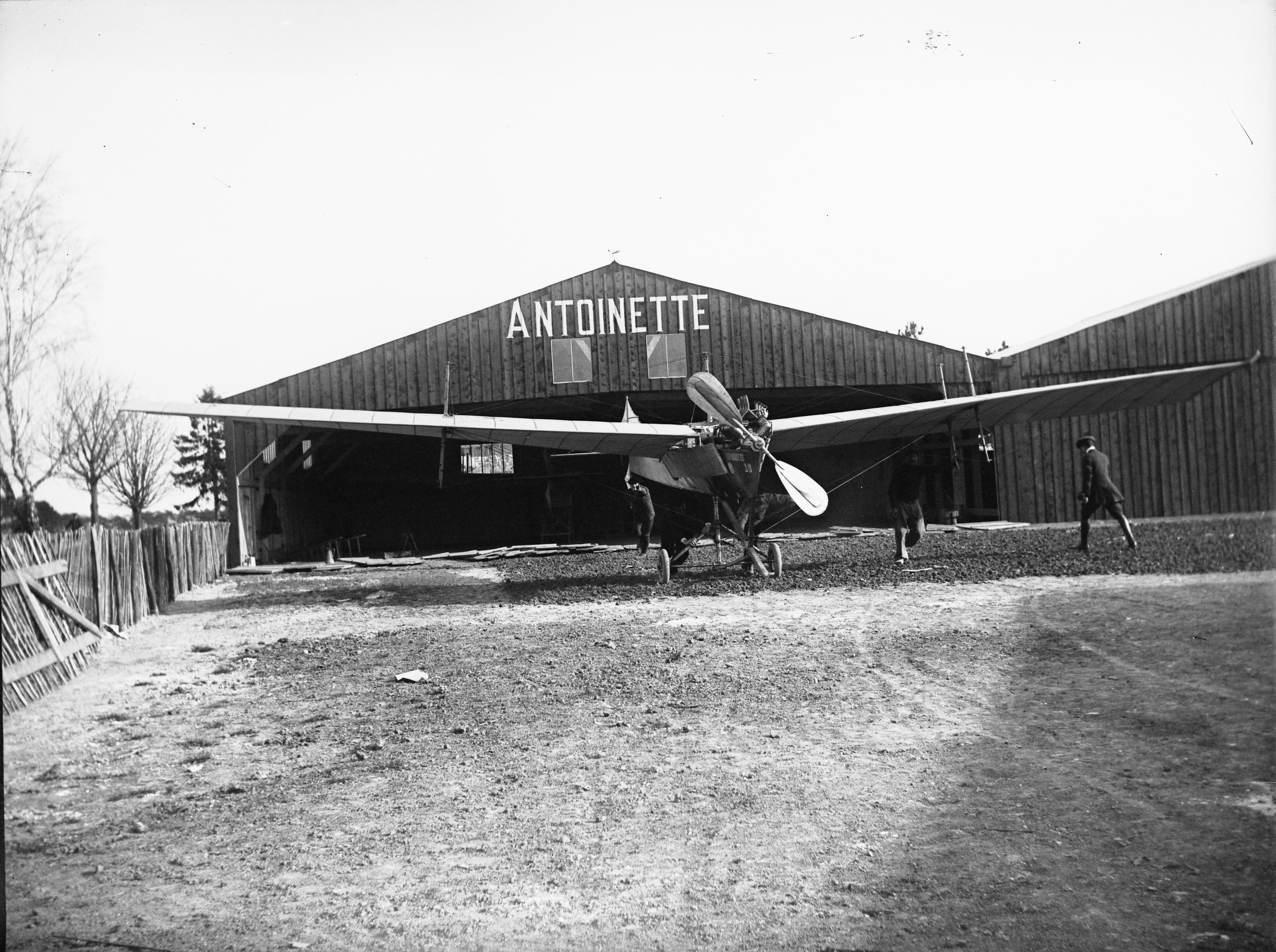
- Antoinette 3 in her hangar

General information
- Type: Pioneer aircraft
- National origin: France
- Manufacturer: Antoinette
- Designer: Léon Levavasseur
- Number built: 1

History
- First flight: 1908
- Developed from: Gastambide-Mengin II

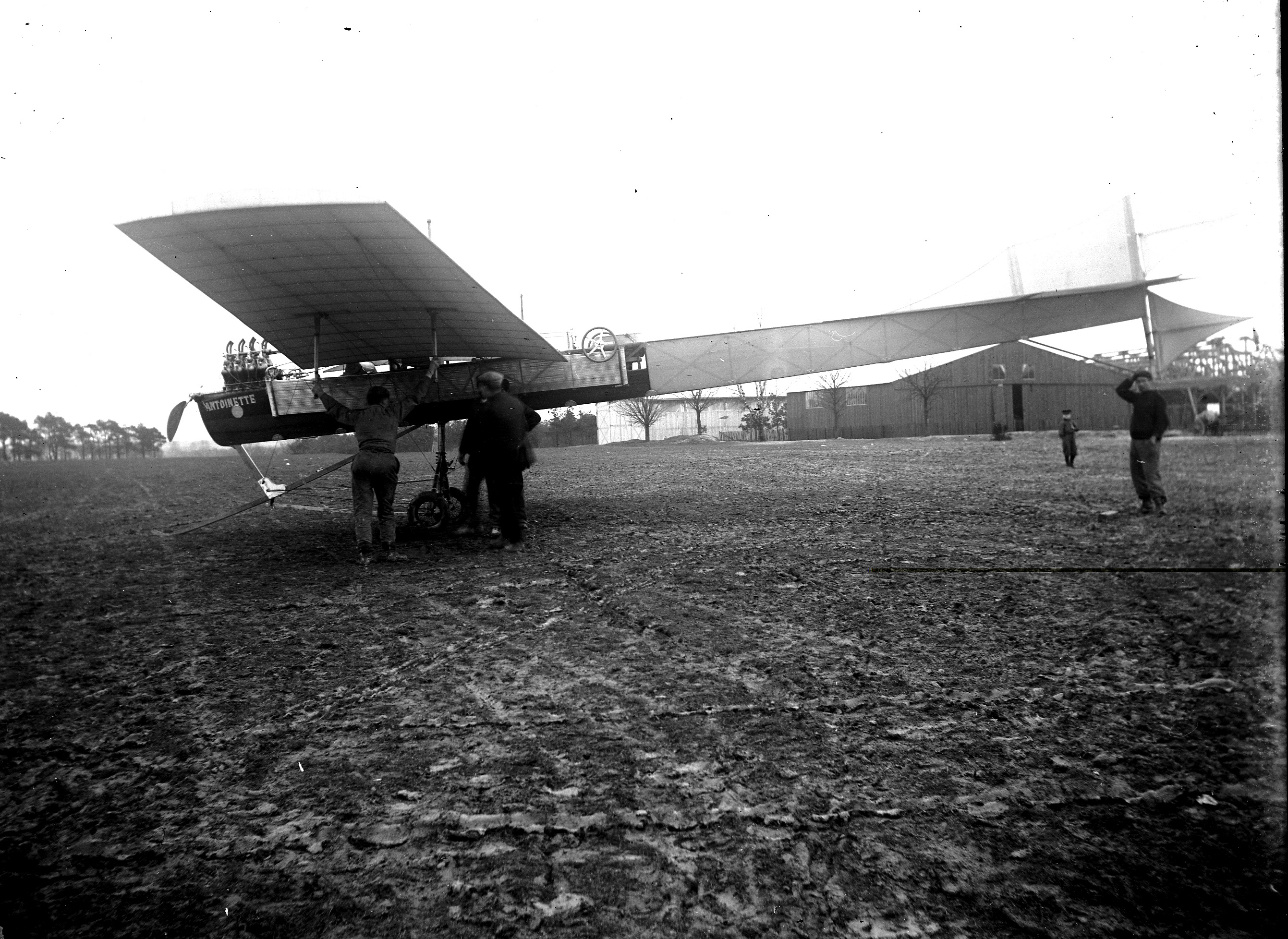
The Antoinette on the way out

Tha Antoinette III was a pioneer aircraft developed in France during 1908.

== Development ==
After the limited success of the Gastambide-Mengin monoplane Levavasseur completely revised the design resulting in the Antoinette III. The inadequate roll control was not greatly improved, retaining the wing warping of the Gastambide-Mengin. Ground handling and take-off / landing performance was improved, however, by revising the complex inadequate quadricycle undercarriage of the Gastambide-Mengin, with strut supported wheels forward and aft on the centre-line and side-by-side wheels midway between the singles. Other improvements came in the form of the cruciform tail unit with large triangular fins above and below the rear fuselage, as well as the large tailplane, all of which supported triangular control surfaces.

Control was found to be marginal at best, but short flights were made regularly.

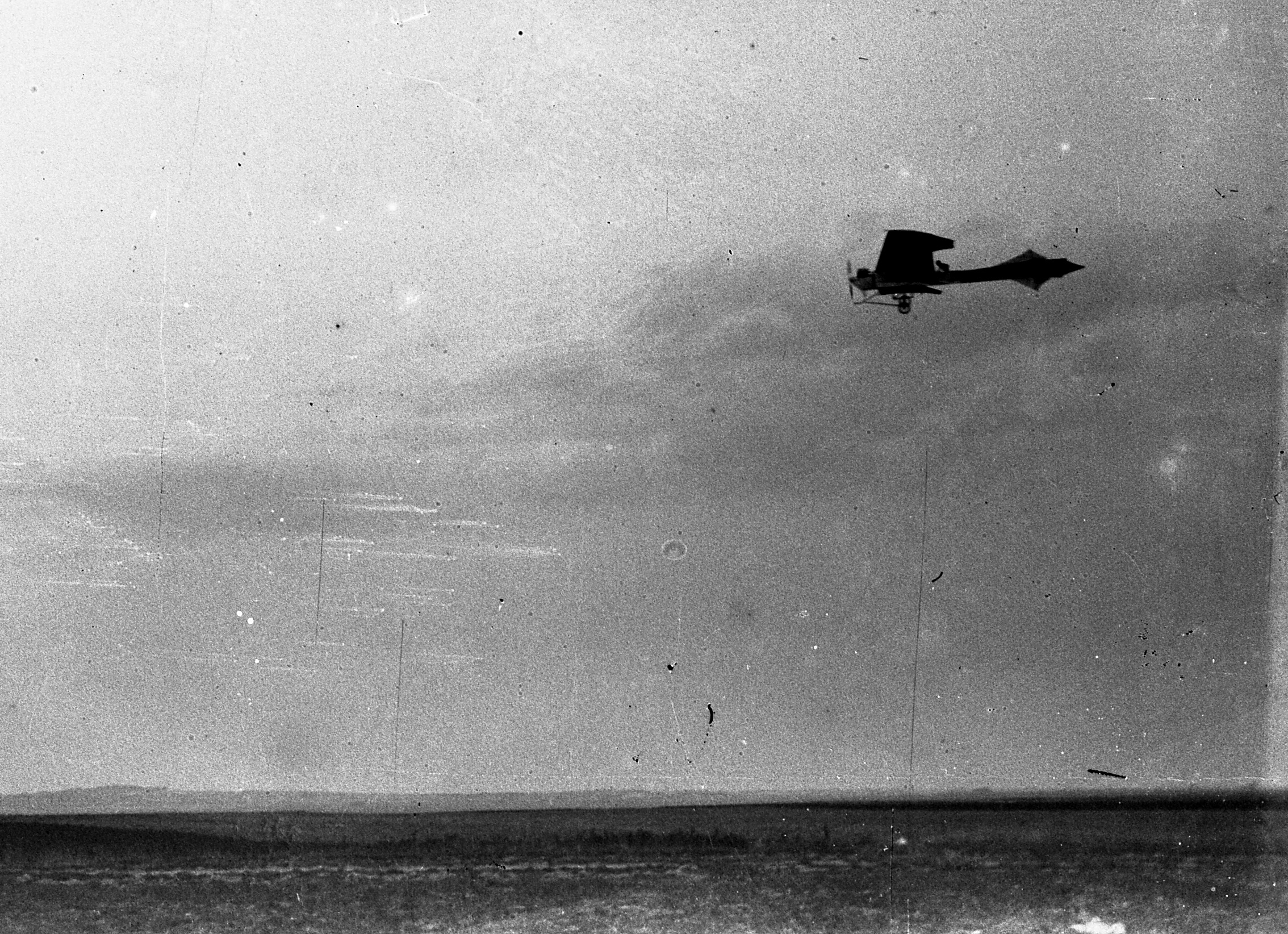
Antoinette in flight

== Specifications (Antoinette III) ==
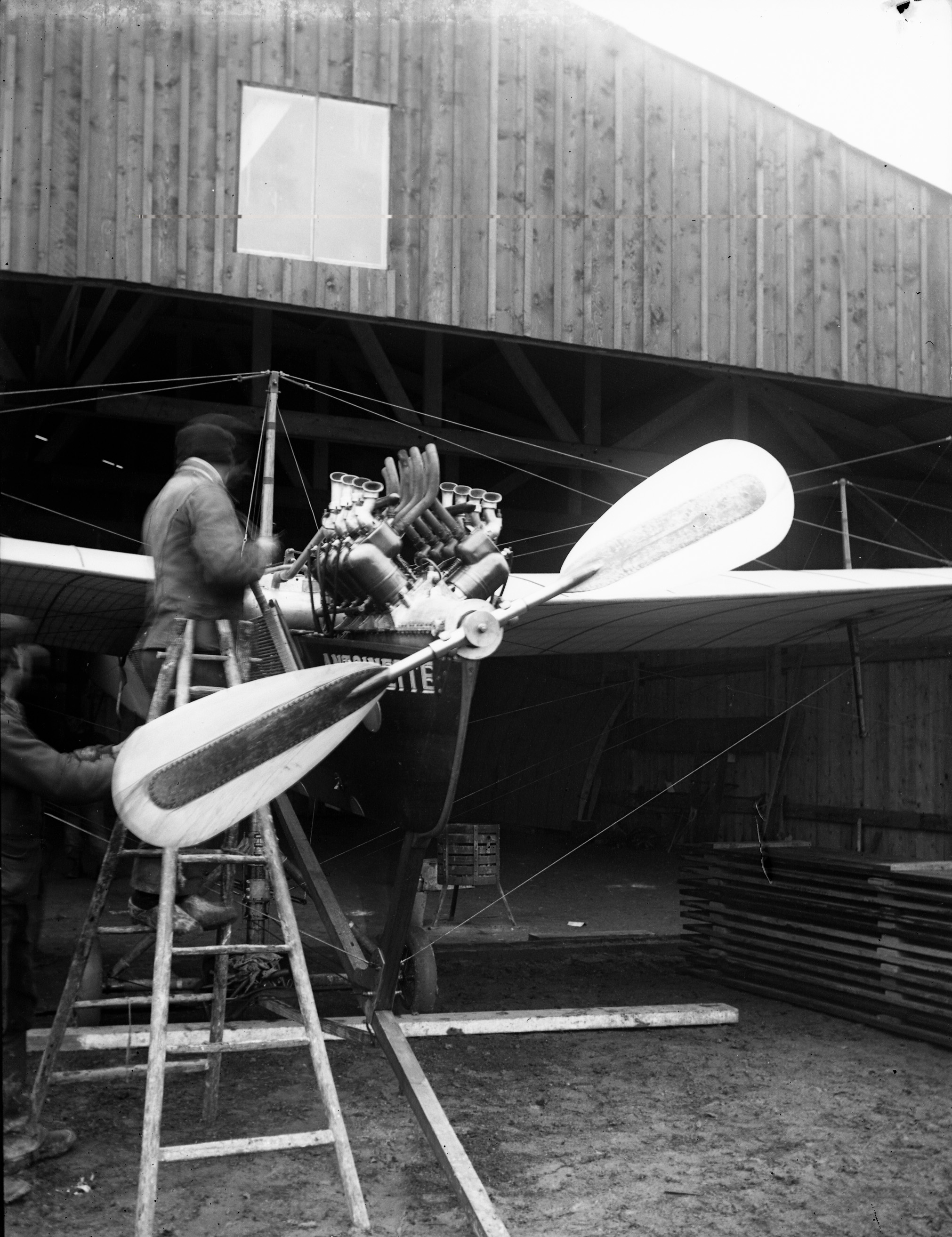
At work on the Antoinette

== See also ==
- Gastambide-Mengin monoplane
- Antoinette IV
- Antoinette V
- Antoinette VI
- Antoinette VII
- Antoinette military monoplane
- Fedor Ivanovich Bylinkin, designer of a similar aircraft, 1910

Related lists List of aircraft (pre-1914)
