= Antoinette V =

1900s French light aircraft

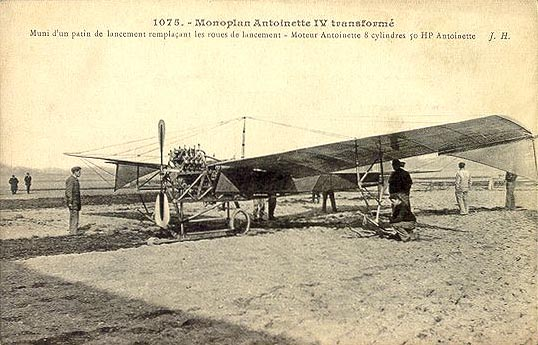
- The Antoinette V recognisable by the revised undercarriage

General information
- Type: Pioneer aircraft
- National origin: France
- Manufacturer: Antoinette
- Designer: Léon Levavasseur
- Number built: 1

History
- First flight: 20 December 1908
- Developed from: Antoinette IV
- Variants: Antoinette VI

The Antoinette V was an early French aircraft, first flown on 20 December 1908.

== Design ==
Following closely to the winning formula that Levavasseur had introduced, the Antoinette V introduced a revised undercarriage, with a closely spaced pair of mainwheels at the rear of a carriage/skid which extended forward of the propeller, a tail-skid attached to the lower fin framework prevented damage to the tail section. Lateral stability on the ground was provided by outrigger wheels supported by a wire-braced framework at about half-span.

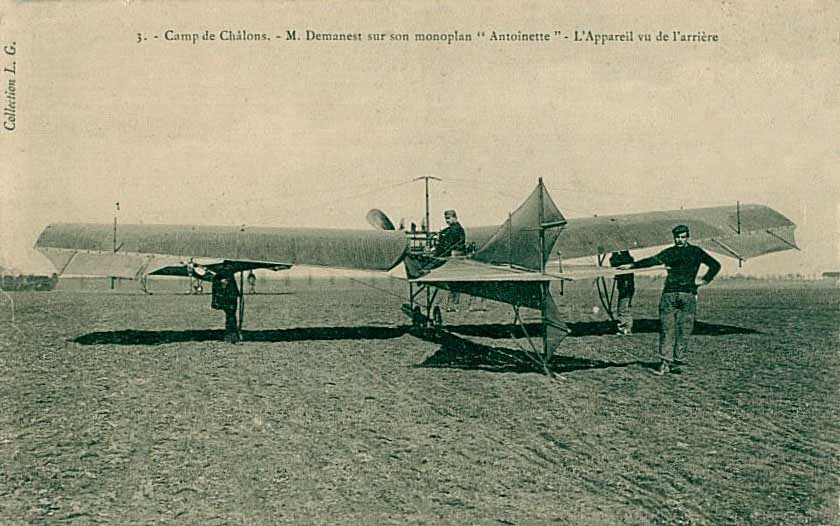
The Antoinette V with Réné Demanest at the controls

== Design and development ==
A development of the Antoinette IV, the Antoinette V differed somewhat in having increased upper vertical tail area with no fabric covering the lower fin framework. The fuselage consisted of a wooden framework of triangular section covered with fabric, except in the cockpit area abreast the wing trailing edge. The wings were built in a similar fashion and were also covered in fabric.

Control was affected by wheels either side of the pilot's seat for roll and pitch, and a rudder bar for yaw. The pilot operated a triangular elevator hinged to the tailing edge of the large tailplane, rhomboidal ailerons hinged from the trailing edges of the wingtips, and two triangular rudders above and below the tailplane.

Delivered to Réné Demanest, the Antoinette V proved easy to fly and enjoyed some success.

== Specifications (Antoinette V) ==
Data from

General characteristics

- Crew: 1
- Length: 11.5 m (37 ft 9 in)
- Wingspan: 12.8 m (42 ft 0 in)
- Wing area: 34 m^{2} (370 sq ft)
- Gross weight: 520 kg (1,146 lb)
- Powerplant: 1 × Antoinette 8V V-8 water-cooled piston engine, 37 kW (50 hp)
- Propellers: 2-bladed Antoinette paddle-bladed, 2.2 m (7 ft 3 in) diameter

Performance

- Maximum speed: 72 km/h (45 mph, 39 kn)

== See also ==
- Gastambide-Mengin monoplane
- Antoinette III
- Antoinette IV
- Antoinette VI
- Antoinette VII
- Antoinette military monoplane
- Fedor Ivanovich Bylinkin, designer of a similar aircraft, 1910

Related lists List of aircraft (pre-1914)
