= Hubert Latham =

French aviation pioneer

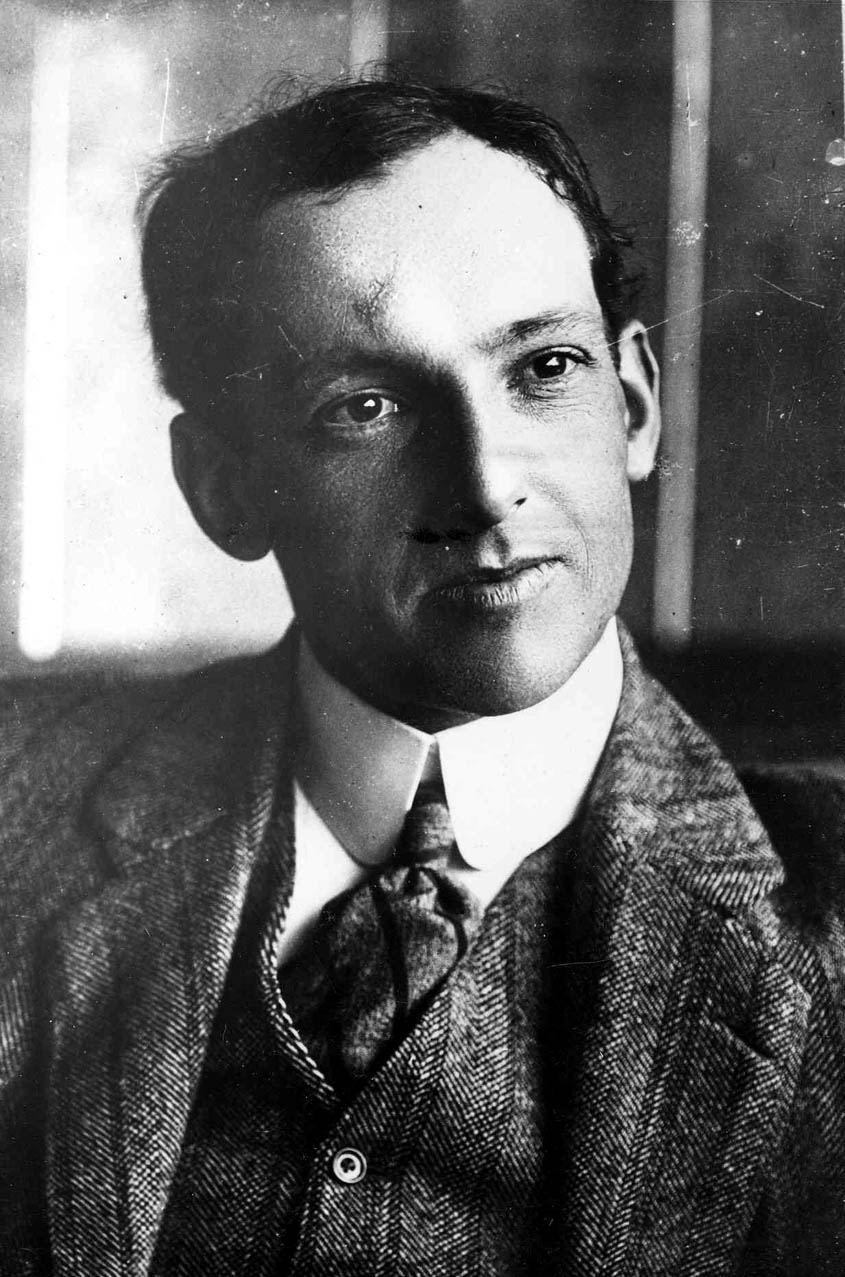
- Latham a few weeks after second Channel attempt. Note the scar on his forehead from the crash injury
- Born: 10 January 1883; Paris, France
- Died: 25 June 1912 (aged 29) near Fort Archambault (now Sarh), Chad
- Cause of death: Buffalo attack (officially) or murder (alleged by at least one publication)
- Occupation: Aviator
- Known for: Pioneering aviator and display pilot

Arthur Charles Hubert Latham (10 January 1883 – 25 June 1912) was a French aviation pioneer. He was the first person to attempt to cross the English Channel in an aeroplane. Due to engine failure during his first of two attempts to cross the Channel, he became the first person to land an aeroplane on a body of water.

In August 1909 at the Grande Semaine d'Aviation de la Champagne he set the world altitude record of 155 metres (509 ft) in his Antoinette IV. In April 1910 he set the official World Airspeed Record of 48.186 miles per hour (77.548 km/h) in his Antoinette VII.

== Early life ==
Latham was born in Paris into a wealthy Protestant family. His French mother's family were the bankers, Mallet Frères et Cie, and his father, Lionel Latham, was the son of Charles Latham, an English merchant adventurer and trader of indigo and other commodities, who had settled in Le Havre in 1829. Hubert Latham's English grand-uncles were mercantile traders, merchant bankers and lawyers in the City of London and Liverpool and his home was the centuries-old Château de Maillebois, near Chartres, which his father purchased from Vicomte de Maleyssie in 1882. One of Latham's maternal grand-aunts was the mother of the German Chancellor, Theobald von Bethmann Hollweg, (appointed in 1909), which made him a second cousin of the aviator.

Latham had two siblings, an older sister, Edmée, and a younger sister, Léonie. The three children were raised within the small but elite circle of Protestant high society. All three children spoke French, English and German fluently. His father, Lionel, died of pneumonia in 1885 and his mother never remarried.

Latham attended Balliol College at the University of Oxford for one academic year 1903/4 after which he fulfilled his reservist military service training obligation in Paris and then accompanied his cousin, the balloonist Jacques Faure, on a night crossing of the English Channel (from London to Paris) in a gas balloon on 11–12 February 1905. He also competed successfully in an Antoinette motor yacht in the power boat racing events at the Monaco Regatta, April 1905, in association with his cousin Jules Gastambide and Léon Levavasseur, the inventor of the Antoinette engine. He then led an exploratory expedition with friends to Abyssinia (Ethiopia) in 1906/07 during which he collected specimens for the Natural History Museum in Paris and performed survey work for the French Colonial Office. In 1908, his travels continued on to the Far East, before returning to France later that year.

== Aviation career ==
=== Association with Antoinette aircraft ===
Latham returned from the Far East in time to take the opportunity of witnessing several of the performances by Wilbur Wright, who was in France trying to sell his aeroplane to the French Government, in his Flyer at Camp d'Auvours, near Le Mans. Intrigued with the idea of flying, Latham searched for an aeroplane company that would train him as a pilot. He selected the Antoinette company headed by Jules Gastambide, a distant cousin, and Léon Levavasseur, co-director, designer, and chief engineer, whom Latham knew from Monaco, since it was Levavasseur who designed the boats Latham raced as well as built their engines which became the precursors of his aeroplane motors. The Antoinette company (named after Gastambide's daughter) had been founded in 1906 to build and sell Levavasseur's engines. The favourable power-to-weight ratio of the engines made them attractive to other early aeroplane builders, including Gabriel Voisin, Louis Blériot, Alberto Santos-Dumont, and Henry Farman, who used them for their own aeroplanes. In 1907 the company decided to build its own aeroplanes, and after several unsuccessful attempts at designing an airworthy model, the first Antoinette monoplane was finally introduced in late 1908.

Antoinette Monoplane, ca.1909

Latham joined the firm in February 1909, and was taught to fly by the company's pilots, Eugène Welféringer and René Demasnet. It took several weeks for Latham to master the complicated controls, but Levavasseur recognized his potential and did not dismiss him. Once Latham became proficient, for the next two years he competed at aviation meets throughout Europe and the United States, setting records and winning prizes. His performances earned him fame on both sides of the Atlantic. While many other pilots flew the Antoinette competitively, either for the company or privately, none mastered the aircraft as well as Latham.

Latham's cousin, René Labouchere, was responsible for the development of "Antoinette" engines, and in the spring of 1909 became the first passenger whom Hubert Latham carried for 200 metres, 5 metres above ground at Mourmelon le Grand.

=== Flying school ===
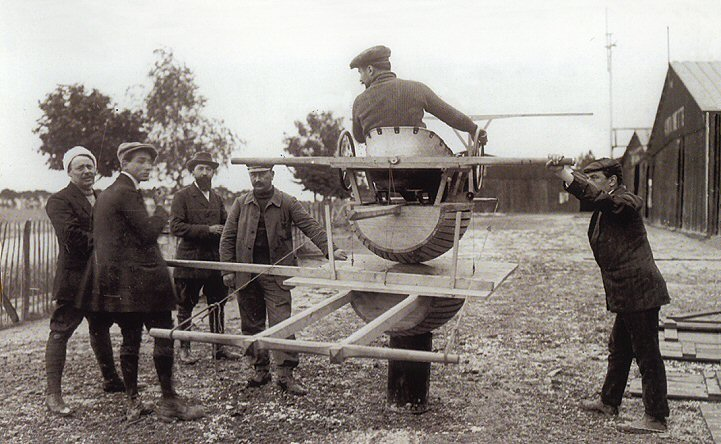
Antoinette's rudimentary 'flight simulator' at Châlons. This method of flight training was mimicked quite accurately in the 1965 film Those Magnificent Men in Their Flying Machines

In early 1909, the Antoinette company worked with the French Army at Camp Châlons near Mourmelon-le-Grand to establish the first military aircraft trials, a flight school and a workshop. The school, run by Levavasseur's brother-in-law Charles Wachter, included the Antoinette Trainer a rudimentary flight simulator that comprised a half-barrel mounted on a universal joint, with flight controls, pulleys, and stub-wings (poles) to allow the trainee to maintain balance while instructors applied external forces.

Within months of both learning to fly and developing his flying technique, Latham became the school's principal instructor. On 17 August 1909 he was awarded Aviator's Certificate number 9 by the Aéro-Club de France. His pupils in 1909 included Marie Marvingt, who became the first woman to fly combat missions as a bomber pilot and established air ambulance services throughout the world, and Infante Alfonso, Duke of Galliera, cousin of King Alfonso XIII of Spain and the first Spanish military pilot.

=== Attempts to win Daily Mail Channel-crossing prize ===
In May 1909, three months after Latham joined the company, he at last realized his potential and flew for 37.5 minutes at a speed of 45 mph at a height of just over 30 m (98 ft). A week later he set the European non-stop flight record at 1 hour and 7 minutes which seriously challenged the Wrights' world record. During this flight he took his hands off the steering wheel, took a cigarette out of his silver case and smoked it in his ivory holder, thus creating a new record. This delighted Levavasseur because it showcased the aeroplane's stability when being flown with hands off the controls. Then on June 6, 1909, Latham won the Prix Ambroise Goupy for flying a straight-line course of six kilometres in 4 minutes, 13 seconds. These flights convinced Levavasseur that Latham was clearly his best pilot and he was named the company's premier pilot. Furthermore, based on the length of the flights Latham was conducting, Levavasseur was satisfied that his Antoinette IV monoplane was sufficiently reliable for a 45 minute-to-1 hour continuous flight and therefore Latham could attempt to fly across the English Channel to win a £1,000 (US$5,000 1910) prize offered by the Daily Mail.

On 9 July 1909, while encamped at Sangatte, several miles west of Calais on the French coast of the English Channel, Latham officially informed the Daily Mail that he intended to cross the Channel by air and claim their prize. He was forced to renew his intention several times as his attempt was continually delayed by bad weather. Within the next four days, Comte Charles de Lambert, a Franco-Russian aviator, also notified the Daily Mail of his intention to compete for the prize and he established his camp at Wissant, several miles west of Sangatte, bringing two French-built Wright Flyers (Nos. 2 and 18) with him.

On 19 July Latham took off from Cap Blanc-Nez, very near Sangatte, but after only 8 miles (13 km) his Antoinette IV suffered engine failure and Latham had to ditch in the Channel, thereby performing the world's first landing of an aircraft on the sea. The undamaged fuselage remained afloat, so he lit a cigarette and awaited rescue by the French torpedo-destroyer Harpon that was following. After recovery of the aircraft, the engine was examined and a stray piece of wire was found inside. Levavasseur stated that the misfire was caused by this wire.

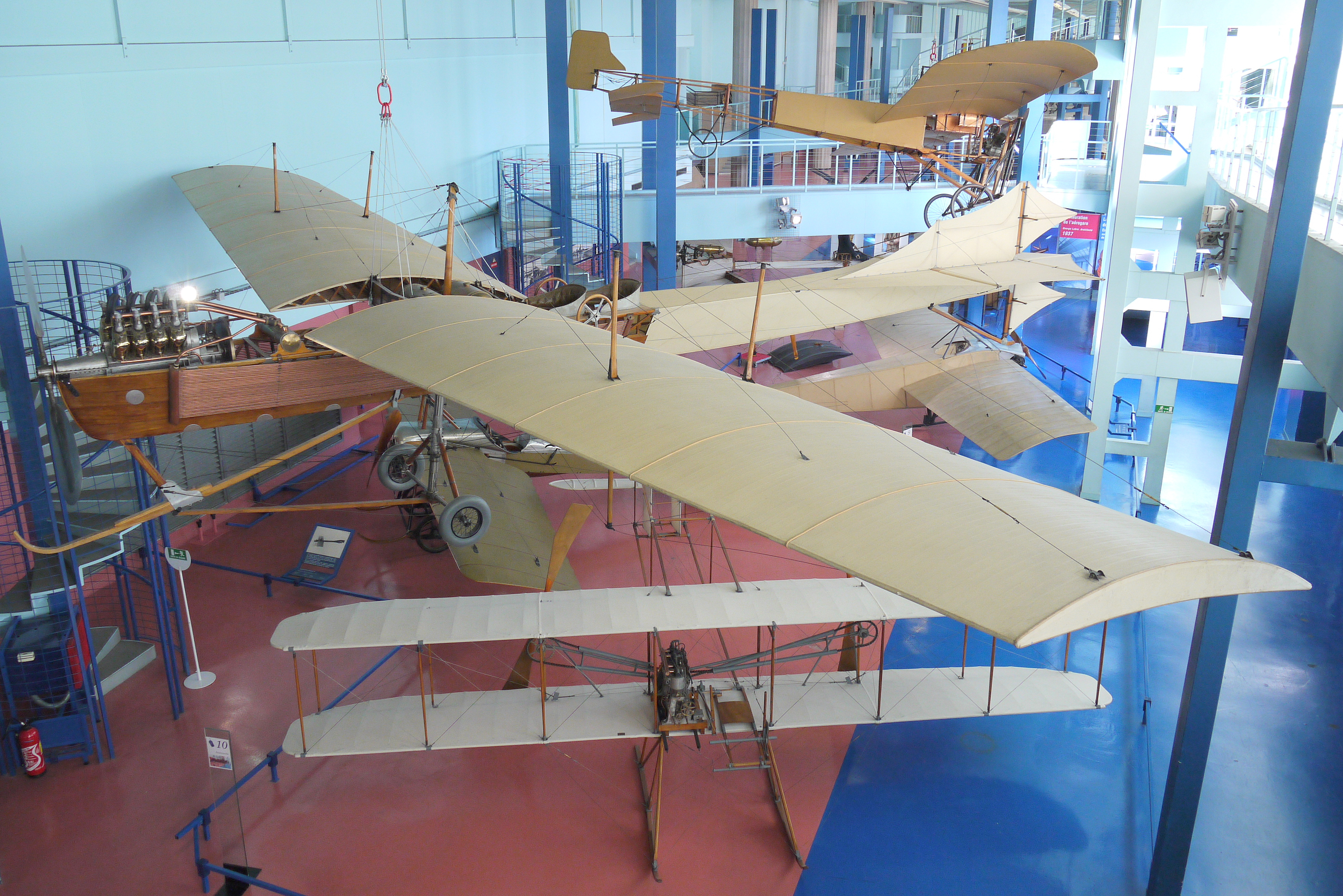
Replicas of two of the aircraft that competed for the Daily Mail Channel-crossing prize: the Antoinette VII (centre) and the Blériot XI (top)

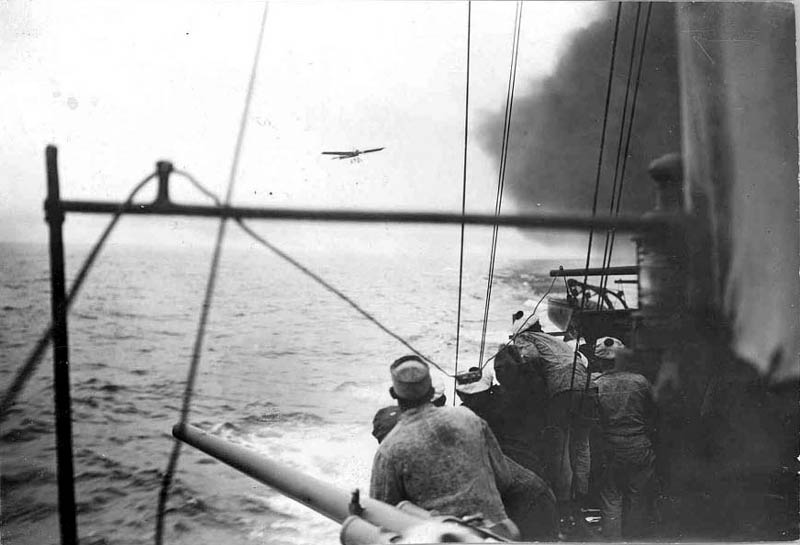
Latham over English Channel on 2nd attempt

In his 1958 book Flying Witness Graham Wallace recounts that, when surrounded by the crowd that greeted Latham on the Calais quayside on 19 July, Levavasseur was asked by the Daily Mail’s reporter Harry Harper if the failure had caused him to be discouraged. The answer was:

“Not in the very least. We have proved that the Channel can be flown. A little accident to a motor, what is that? Accidents happen to bicycles, to horses, even to bath-chairs...We have a machine that can go on land, in the air, and in the water. It runs, it flies, it swims. C'est un triomphe!”".

Because the salvage operation on Latham's first Antoinette resulted in severe damage to the aircraft, Levavasseur was forced to arrange for a second plane to be shipped from the factory in Puteaux, a Paris suburb, and it arrived on July 21. It was their newest model, the Antoinette VII, and it had never been tested in flight, although Latham did get a chance to fly it once, briefly, while he waited for the foul weather to abate.

A day later, Louis Blériot set up camp just under 2 miles (3.2 km) away from Latham at Les Baraques and announced his intention to go for the prize in his Blériot XI monoplane, and the two contestants had to wait for better weather. Meanwhile, de Lambert damaged one of his Flyers in a test flight shortly after Blériot's arrival and decided to withdraw from the competition.

At about 3 a.m. the morning of 25 July 1909 Blériot's team noticed a break in the weather, awakened him, prepared the aircraft, and waited for dawn to make the attempt if the favourable conditions still held. Levavasseur and the rest of Latham's team, however, slept the night through and failed to notice the opportunity, a lapse which was rigorously criticised by Latham’s supporters. Blériot took off precisely at dawn (4.41am) to make the first successful crossing of the English Channel by aeroplane.

Harry Harper, the Daily Mail reporter who was witness to the event, wrote that Levavasseur woke up just in time to see Blériot's aeroplane leaving the French coast and he rushed to wake Latham and his crew to see if it could be possible to catch Blériot or overtake him should the latter not succeed in crossing the Channel. By the time Latham's monoplane was in position atop the cliffs at Cap Blanc-Nez, a gusty wind had risen, accompanied by heavy rains, so that "any attempt at a take-off would have been nothing less than suicidal."

Two days later, on 27 July, Latham made a second attempt to cross the Channel. He was within minutes of arriving in the vicinity of Dover when engine failure again forced him into the sea. This time he could not control the angle of descent as well as he had in his first attempt and when he hit the water he seriously damaged the aircraft and suffered severe lacerations to his forehead. Although no definitive cause of engine failure for this second attempt was found, two possibilities were put forward. One is that the innovative fuel-injection system became clogged due to unfiltered fuel. Aviation pioneer Gabriel Voisin, who used Antoinette engines in his own planes, posited another possibility which he argued was also the cause of Latham's first failure: "The Antoinette V-8 [motor] furnished a significant fraction less of its power after running more than 15 minutes. It was this problem that provoked Latham's fall into the sea."

Latham wanted to make yet another attempt but as British pioneer aviator Claude Grahame-White wrote:

"It is a tribute to Latham's courage that, immediately he was well enough to fly again, he should want to make a third attempt to cross the Channel. But the directors of the Antoinette Company, having already spent a large sum of money upon the project, and having lost two machines, were not inclined to take the risk of a third venture, particularly as the great Reims flying meeting was now imminent and they desired to send all their available machines there."

=== Further aviation career ===
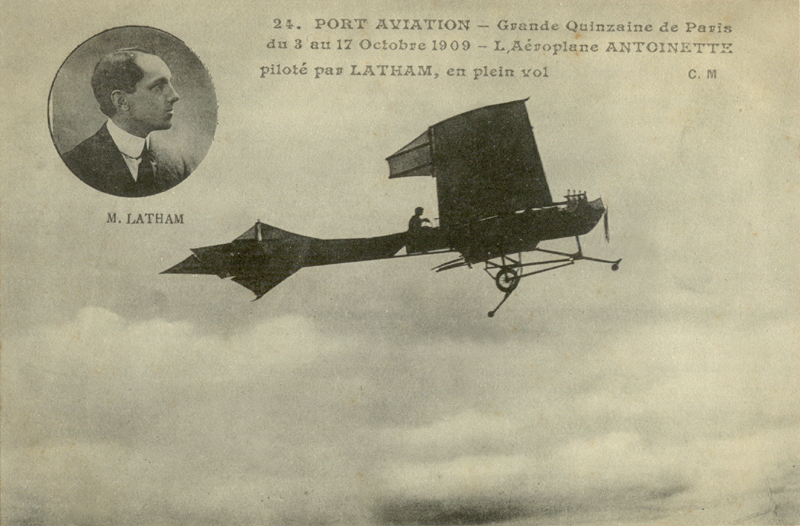
Hubert Latham and his Antoinette IV monoplane at the Grande Quinzaine de Paris, 3–17 October 1909,

Latham participated in twelve other competitions throughout Europe and, in late 1910 and early 1911, four in the United States: New York, site of the second Gordon Bennett International Gold Cup race, where Latham was a member of the French team (it was the first flight in a competition of the Antoinette VII equipped with a V-16 100 hp motor.); Baltimore, Los Angeles, and San Francisco.

==== Champagne 1909 ====
At the Grande Semaine d'Aviation de la Champagne on 22–29 August 1909 at Reims, France, (the first true international aviation competition that drew almost 100,000 spectators on opening day. Latham came in second for the speed competition 68.9 km/h (42.8 mph) and was first in the altitude contest, flying an Antoinette IV, setting a world record of 155 metres (509 ft). He also competed in the Grand Prix event, trying to fly the longest distance around the circuit in a single uninterrupted flight, making several attempts in two different aircraft over the three-days. He won prizes for second place in one aircraft (Antoinette IV) and fifth in the other (Antoinette VII ).

Latham competed as a member of the French team in the first Coupe Internationale d'Aviation, popularly known as the Gordon Bennett Cup since its inauguration as a hot air balloon contest years earlier, which was also held during the first "Reims Week". Piloting the Antoinette VII he placed third with Glenn Curtiss, the only American entrant at the competition, earning first prize and Louis Blériot coming in second.

==== Blackpool 1909 ====
One of Latham's more spectacular exhibition flights took place in Blackpool, England, on 22 October 1909, where he flew in a gale. The signal was given that the wind was over the limit of 15 mph, but Latham took off and covered 8 miles (13 km) in 11 minutes in winds ranging between 23 mph and 40 mph.

When he flew downwind he later estimated that his ground speed reached 100 mph during the flight. When he flew directly into the wind, however, one of the stronger gusts he encountered drove him backwards. This was reported as the first time people ever saw an aeroplane fly in reverse. According to one local historian, the incident came about to fulfill his promise to fly given to the Tsar’s cousin and his wife with whom he had dined the previous night. Newspaper reporters dubbed him ‘King of the Air’, in a similar way that the soubriquet ‘The Storm King’, had been created by the press after his encounters with stiff winds at Reims.

==== World records ====
On 7 January 1910, in Mourmelon-le-Grand, France, Latham climbed to an altitude of 1,100 m (3,600 ft), more than 610 m (2,000 ft) higher than his previous world record and beyond previous claims of unofficial records. Later the same year, in July during the second Semaine de l'Aviation de la Champagne at Reims, Latham again set a world altitude record of 1,384 m (4,541 ft).

On 23 April 1910 at Nice, France he set the official World Airspeed Record of 48.186 mph (77.548 km/h) in his Antoinette VII.

==== American sojourn ====
While attending the Baltimore Air Show in the United States in November 1910, Latham took part in special demonstrations for spectators drawn from US government and army representatives to display the capabilities of aircraft for waging war on land and at sea. During one simulated bomb-dropping exercise using bags of flour instead of high explosives, he was rated as scoring a bullseye by dropping one down the funnel of a battleship.

In Los Angeles in December 1910, while Latham was participating in an aviation meet, he was asked by one of the wealthier citizens of the city if he would consider coming to his estate to try to shoot wild duck in the air from his aeroplane. Latham agreed and shot two with a borrowed shotgun and thus became the first person to hunt wild fowl from an aeroplane. Again, Levavasseur had reason to be pleased over yet another demonstration of his aircraft's stability. Latham had one of the ducks stuffed and it is still displayed at the Château de Maillebois.

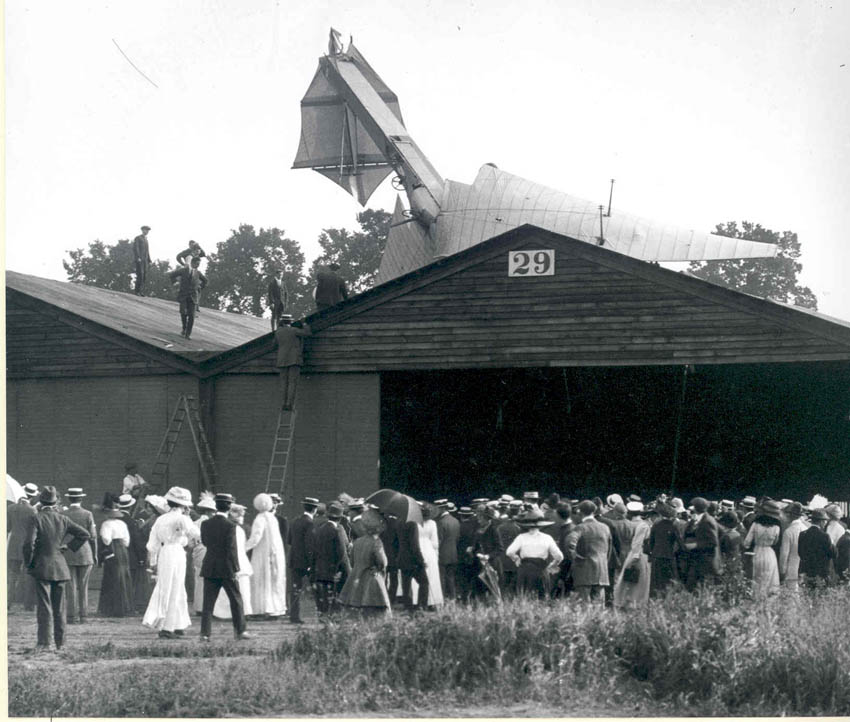
Latham's spectacular crash at Brooklands in 1911

In Los Angeles, Latham had a serious crash attributed to wind gusts. He misjudged the strength of the wind while trying to land, which resulted in his being driven into a hillside. The Los Angeles Times ran the following headline about the incident:

"Fights a Hurricane With Man-Made Bird. Aviator Latham Takes Desperate Chances, While Great Throng Holds Its Breath, and After Terrible Struggle Against the Wind His Machine is Crushed Upon Hillside - He's Uninjured."

==== Brooklands crash ====
Latham survived another crash in early 1911 when he gave a demonstration flight at the Brooklands automobile racing course in England. Harry Harper described the incident:

..."Latham threw his machine about in the air in a way that made fellow airmen gasp. They had never seen anything like it before. But in making one final manoeuvre he misjudged by a matter of inches his height above a shed. One of his wing-tips just touched the roof. Instantly there came a devastating crash. A huge cloud of dust arose. And then the monoplane could be seen hanging - a mass of wreckage - on the top of the roof. It seemed almost certain that Latham must have been killed. The impact had appeared so tremendous - the crash so complete. But suddenly, amid the drifting dust clouds, a slight, dapper figure could be seen disengaging itself from the battered fuselage, and lowering itself deftly to an undamaged part of the roof. Then out came that inevitable cigarette case, and Latham sat there smoking till someone arrived with a ladder."

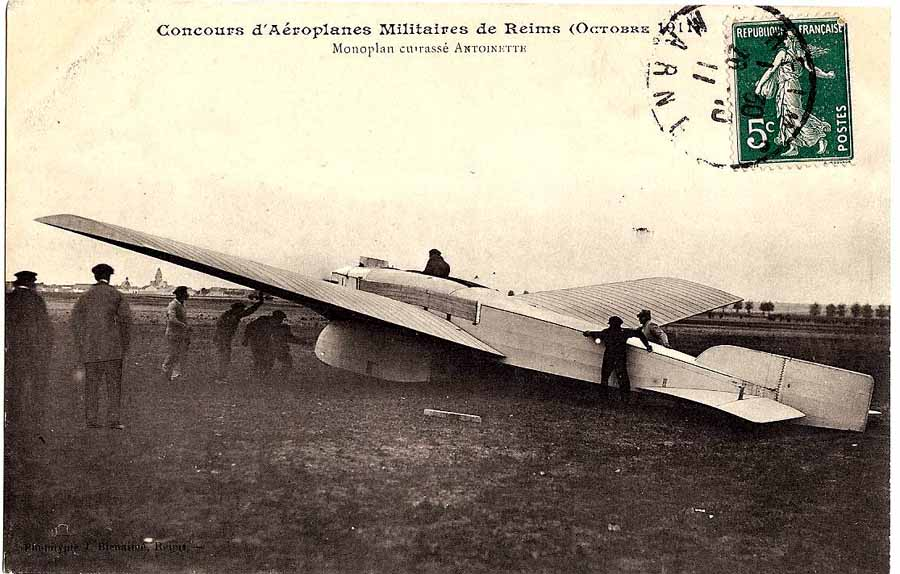
Latham in Antoinette Monobloc at the Reims Military Trials, October 1911

==== Military testing ====
By the autumn of 1911, Levavasseur had completed building an aeroplane known as the Monobloc or Antoinette blindé (Fr. 'armoured') that was engineered and designed in accordance with the French Ministry of War's requirements. It was entered in the military trials staged at Reims in October 1911 to compete with 10 other entries from as many companies. Levavasseur insisted that Latham would be the pilot. Unfortunately, in the rush to have his aeroplane built in time to enter the trials, Levavasseur never had the chance to test it. The result was that the aeroplane failed to get airborne despite two attempts by Latham because Levavasseur did not have a powerful enough motor that could cope with the significant weight of the aircraft. The Monobloc's failure and subsequent loss of a potentially lucrative government contract was the final blow to the Antoinette company which folded the next month.

== Death ==
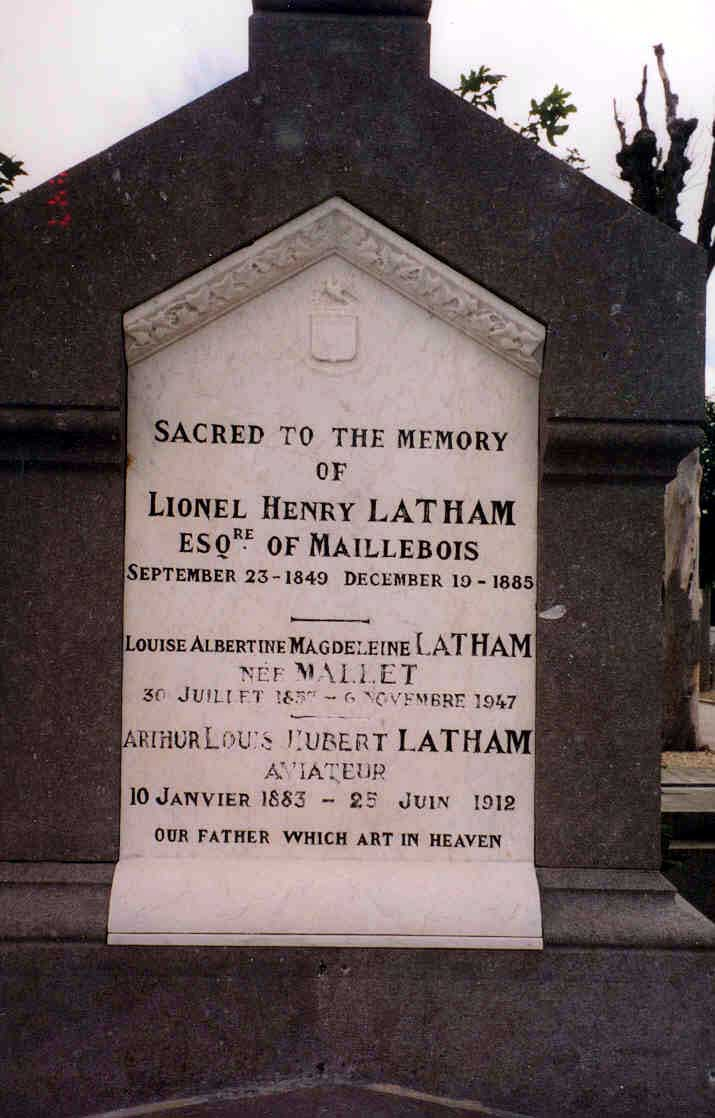
Latham is buried with his parents in Le Havre, France. In error, one of his middle names, Charles, was replaced by Louis on the headstone. This has never been corrected

At the end of December 1911, Latham left France to undertake an expedition to the French Congo. Following recent wars to retain their control over this part of Africa, this region continued to be a virtual war zone administered by the French Colonial military authorities. A number of air-fields were being planned for the Sahara to the north of the Congo and there was speculation at the time that Latham may have been asked to undertake an assessment of conditions in the interior region for the French Colonial Office. One aviation journalist suggested that he was to be ‘acting on their behalf in a matter that is not disclosed’. Latham did not ship an aircraft but instead brought an out-board engine for a canoe.

Although an experienced and expert hunter of wild game, his death is officially reported to have been caused by being mauled by a wounded buffalo. However, in one anonymous contemporary newspaper article which appeared in 1914, it was claimed that the adjutant-commandant of a French Colonial Army fort located just outside Fort Archambault, who retrieved his body after his death, had found that Latham had sustained a single head wound and saw no marks on or around Latham's body consistent with a rampaging buffalo. The writer claimed that the commandant believed, based on the physical evidence and on the conflicting reports of the porters under questioning, that it was possible Latham had been murdered by one or more of his porters, perhaps in order to steal his rifles, but was unable to prove it. Latham was originally buried in Fort Lamy (now N'Djamena, capital city of Chad), because French colonial law forbade the transport of any human remains to another country until a full year had lapsed since death. In January 1914 Latham's mother arranged to have her son's corpse disinterred and shipped to Le Havre where he was re-interred in the family plot. He had never married and thus left no direct descendants.

Latham's own written account of his final weeks in the bush described his unease over the discipline of his team of bearers, and also his anxiety over the levels of discord and violence that ruled this military administered area. The official investigation into Latham's death took no cognisance of his concerns and recorded the incident as a tragic hunting accident.

Aviation reporter and author Harry Harper, who had witnessed Latham's career from his cross-Channel attempts to the failure of the Monobloc at the French military trials two years later, wrote the following about Hubert Latham in his final book, published in 1956:

"Slight, dapper, pale of face, Latham always seemed languid and fatigued until he took his place at the controls of his beloved aeroplane. Then he seemed to become a different man. His eyes sparkled. He appeared in a flash to become intensely alive. And I do not think there was ever a finer pilot."

== Legacy ==
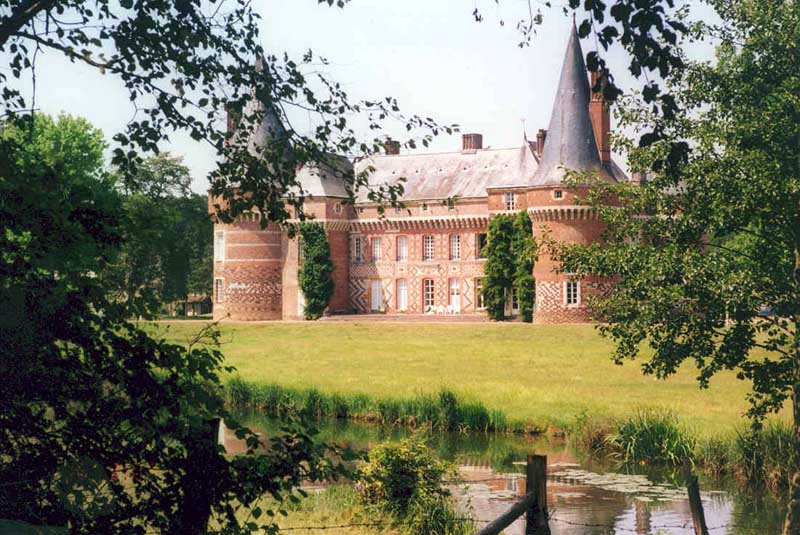
The 15th-century Château de Maillebois, Hubert Latham's family estate, purchased by his father in 1882. It is still in the Latham family

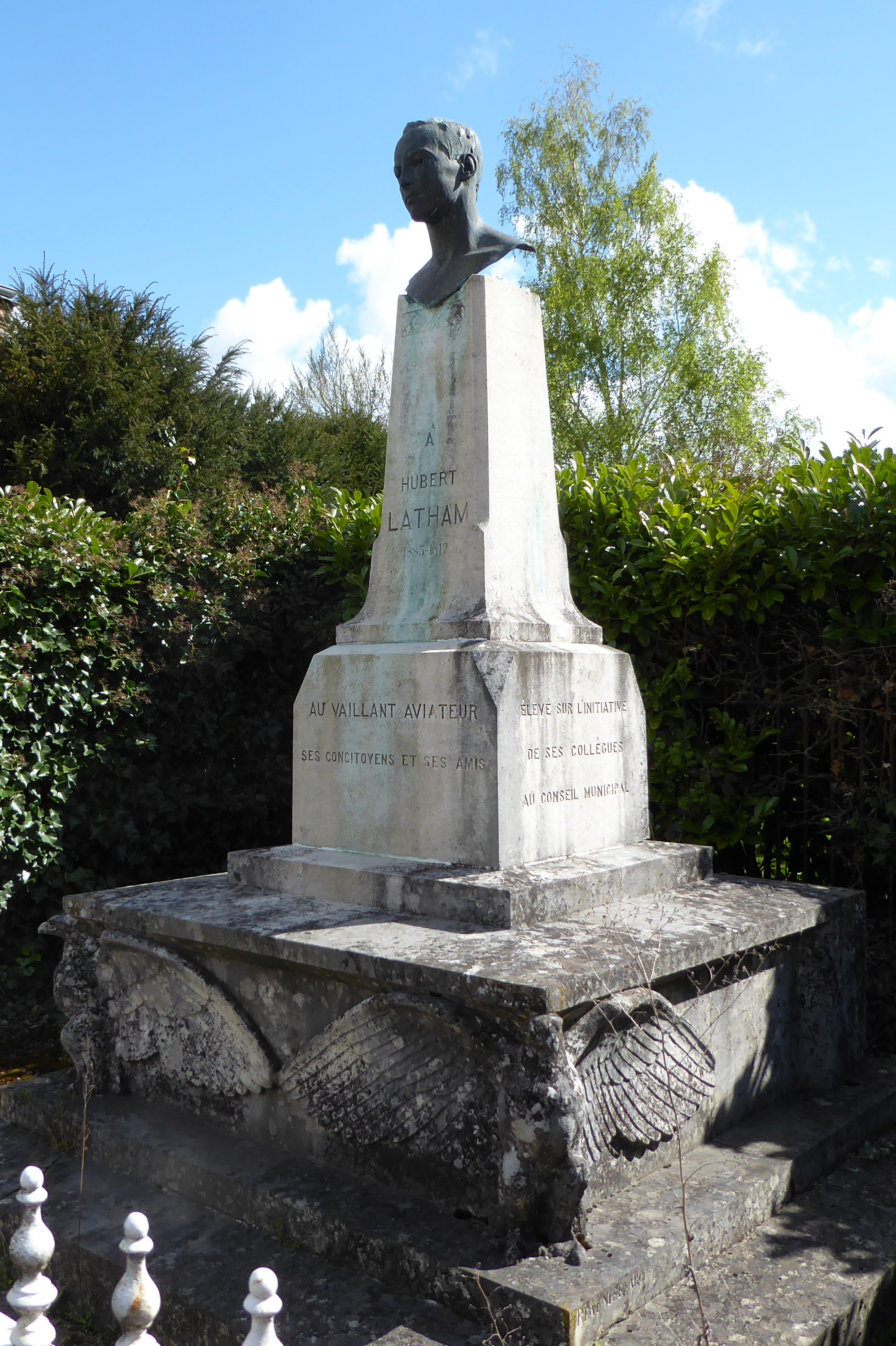
The monument in the centre of Maillebois on the D939

A statue erected by the French to Latham's memory overlooks the English Channel near the Dover Patrol Monument, on top of Cap Blanc-Nez between Calais and Boulogne-sur-Mer.

According to Henry Villard in his 2002 book - Contact! The Story of the Early Aviators :

Proudly displayed at the Château de Maillebois is a handsome silver trophy awarded to Latham by a Berlin air club for the first overland flight in Germany, completed on September 27, 1909, between the embryonic flying fields of Tempelhof and Johannisthal. On a wide expanse of meadow adjoining the Château is a stone marker to commemorate the day that Hubert first flew down from Paris for lunch. A monument stands in the centre of Maillebois, opposite the Place de l'Hôtel de Ville.

As the D939 route passes through Maillebois it is named 'rue Hubert Latham'.(scale:1000 region:FR 48.633°N 1.1472°E)

A fictionalized version of Latham is a central character in the 2021 novel Man of the World by Layne Maheu.

== See also ==
- List of firsts in aviation
