= Antoinette VI =

1900s French light aircraft

General information
- Type: Experimental aircraft
- Manufacturer: Antoinette
- Designer: Léon Levavasseur

History
- First flight: 1909

The Antoinette VI was an early French aircraft, flown in 1909. It was a development of the Antoinette IV, its major technological advance being that it was fitted with true ailerons, whereas the former aircraft had ailerons mounted as separate surfaces on the trailing edges of the wings. Nevertheless, Levavasseur was not satisfied with this innovation and later modified the aircraft to use a wing warping system similar to that fitted to the Antoinette V.

== See also ==
- Gastambide-Mengin monoplane
- Antoinette III
- Antoinette IV
- Antoinette V
- Antoinette VII
- Antoinette military monoplane
- Fedor Ivanovich Bylinkin, designer of a similar aircraft, 1910

Related lists List of aircraft (pre-1914)
