= Antoinette VII =

1909 experimental French aircraft

VII
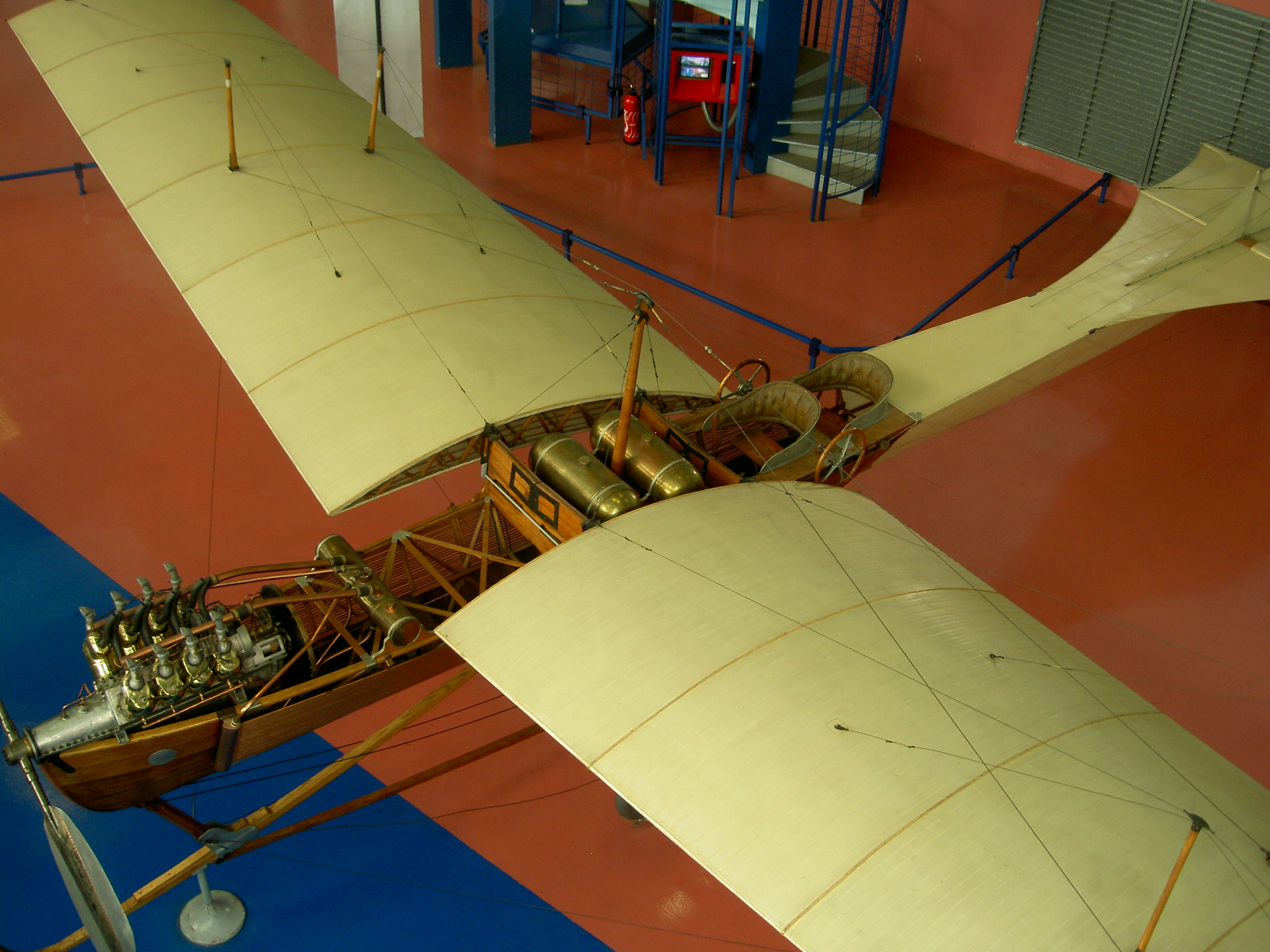
- Antoinette VII example showing seating arrangement for two

General information
- Type: Experimental aircraft
- Manufacturer: Antoinette
- Designer: Léon Levavasseur

History
- First flight: 1909

The Antoinette VII was an early French aircraft, flown in 1909.

== History ==
The VII was a further development of the Antoinette IV, with increased engine power and using a wing warping system implemented by Levavasseur for the Antoinette V in place of the Antoinette IV's ailerons.

With this aircraft, Levavasseur hoped that Antoinette test pilot Hubert Latham would be able to make the crossing of the English Channel that he had previously attempted in the Antoinette IV and claim the Daily Mail prize then on offer. As it happened, the Antoinette VII's first flight took place on 25 July 1909, the same day that Louis Blériot succeeded in crossing the channel in his Blériot XI. Undaunted, Latham made the attempt anyway on 27 July. Unfortunately, the result was the same, with Latham making a forced landing this time within sight of the English coast only 1.6 km (0.99 mi) away. He and the aircraft were rescued by HMS Russell.

Antoinette VII, 1909

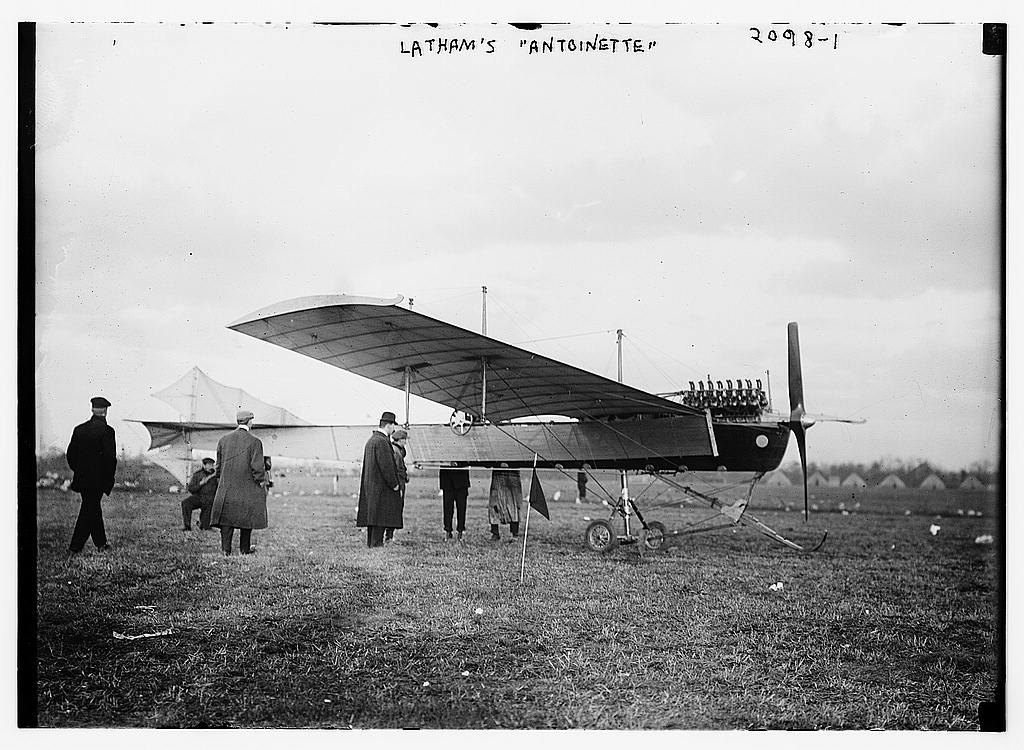
Latham's Antoinette VII. This is a 1910 version with 100 hp V-16 engine.

The following month, Latham flew the same aircraft at the Grande Semaine d'Aviation de la Champagne, winning the prize for altitude (155 m, 509 ft) and coming second in the contest for the fastest circuit, with a speed of 68.9 km/h, 42.8 mph

== Specifications ==
General characteristics

- Crew: one, pilot (later versions after 1910 could accommodate one passenger)
- Length: 11.50 m (37 ft 9 in)
- Wingspan: 12.80 m (42 ft 0 in)
- Height: 3.00 m (9 ft 10 in)
- Wing area: 50 m^{2} (538 sq ft)
- Gross weight: 590 kg (1,300 lb)
- Powerplant: 1 × Antoinette 8V , 37 kW (50 hp)

Performance

- Maximum speed: 70 km/h (44 mph, 38 kn)

== See also ==
- Gastambide-Mengin monoplane
- Antoinette III
- Antoinette IV
- Antoinette V
- Antoinette VI
- Antoinette military monoplane
- Fedor Ivanovich Bylinkin, designer of a similar aircraft, 1910
- Antoinette VII un avión con historia

Related lists List of aircraft (pre-1914)
