= Antoinette IV =

1900s French light aircraft

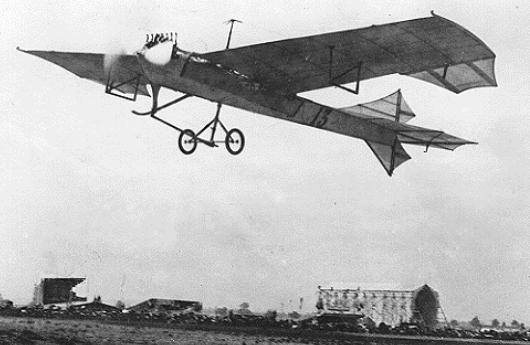
- Antoinette IV in flight

General information
- Type: Experimental aircraft
- Manufacturer: Antoinette
- Designer: Léon Levavasseur
- Status: Destroyed
- Number built: 1

History
- First flight: 19 October 1908

The Antoinette IV was an early French monoplane.

== Design and development ==
The Antoinette IV was a high-wing aircraft with a fuselage of extremely narrow triangular cross-section and a cruciform tail. Power was provided by a V8 engine of Léon Levavasseur's own design driving a paddle-bladed tractor propeller. Lateral control was at first effected with large triangular, and shortly afterwards trapezoidal-planform ailerons hinged to the trailing edge of the wings, although wing-warping was substituted at an early stage in flight trials, and in this type proved more effective.

On 19 February 1909, the Antoinette IV flew 5 km (3.1 mi) at Mourmelon-le-Grand, and on 19 July, Hubert Latham attempted to cross the English Channel in it, covering 11 km (6.8 mi) out of Sangatte before making a forced water landing due to engine failure.

On 3 October 1910, Frenchman René Thomas, flying the Antoinette IV, collided with British Army Captain Bertram Dickson by ramming his Farman III biplane in the rear. Both pilots survived, but Dickson was so badly injured that he never flew again.

== Specifications ==
General characteristics

- Crew: one, pilot
- Length: 11.50 m (37 ft 9 in)
- Wingspan: 12.80 m (42 ft 0 in)
- Wing area: 50 m^{2} (538 sq ft)
- Empty weight: 250 kg (550 lb)
- Powerplant: 1 × Antoinette 8V , 37 kW (50 hp)

== See also ==
- Gastambide-Mengin monoplane
- Antoinette III
- Antoinette V
- Antoinette VI
- Antoinette VII
- Antoinette military monoplane
- Fedor Ivanovich Bylinkin, designer of a similar aircraft, 1910

Related lists List of aircraft (pre-1914)
