= Wing warping =

Early system for lateral control of a fixed-wing aircraft

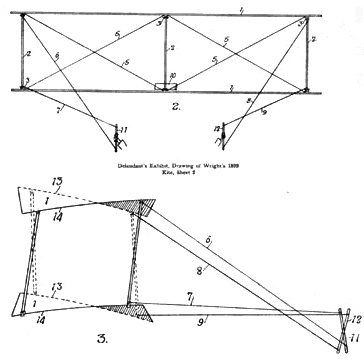
Diagram of the Wright brothers' 1899 kite, showing wing bracing and strings attached to hand-held sticks used for warping the wing while in flight.

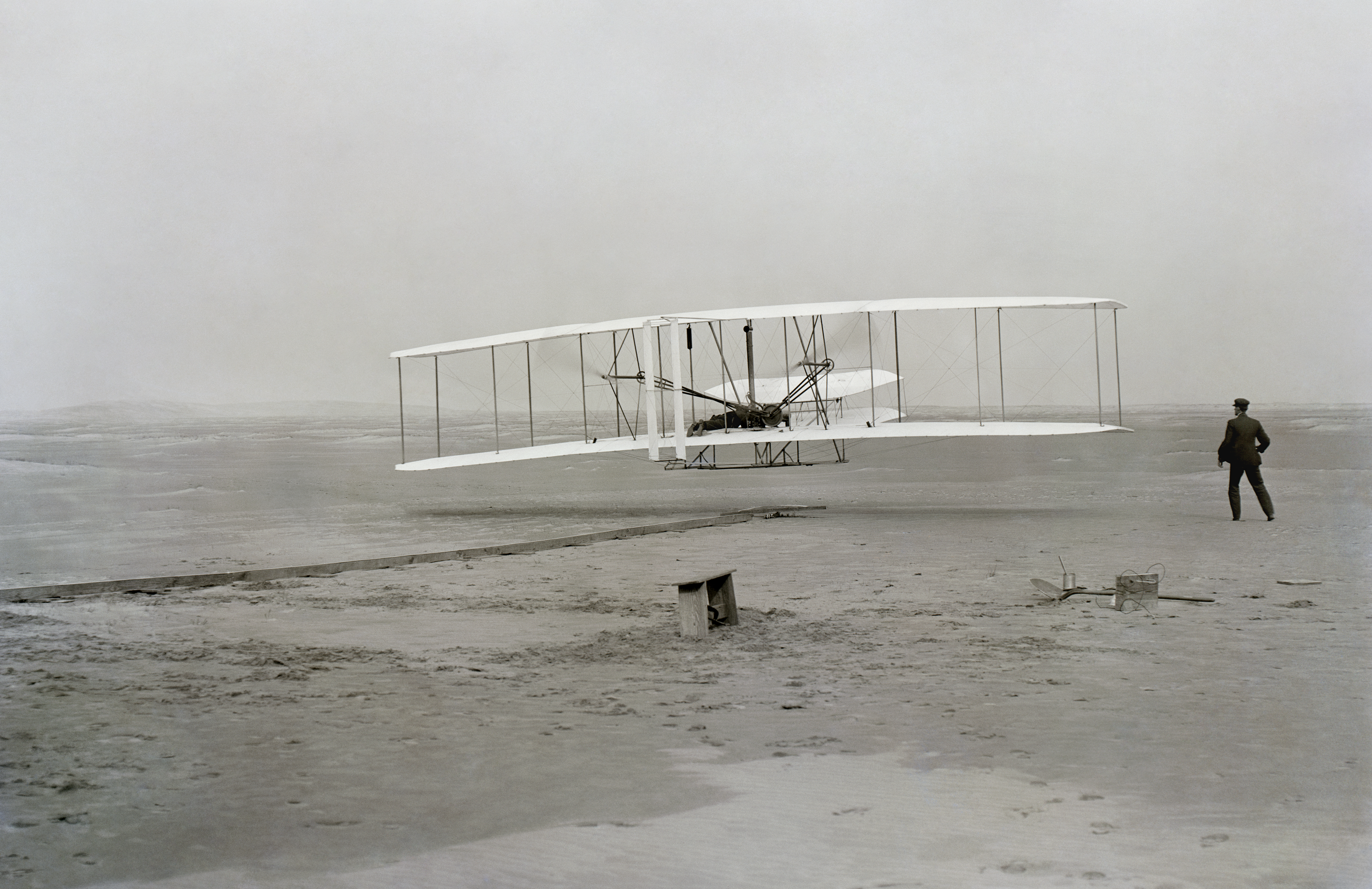
The Wright brothers' first powered aircraft, which utilized warping wings.

Wing warping was an early system for lateral (roll) control of a fixed-wing aircraft or kite. The technique, used and patented by the Wright brothers, consisted of a system of pulleys and cables to twist the trailing edges of the wings in opposite directions. In many respects, this approach is similar to that used to trim the performance of a paper airplane by curling the paper at the back of its wings.

== Description ==
In 1900, Wilbur Wright wrote, "...my observations of the flight of birds convince me that birds use more positive and energetic methods of regaining equilibrium than that of shifting the center of gravity...they regain their lateral balance...by a torsion of the tips of the wings. If the rear edge of the right wing tip is twisted upward and the left downward the bird becomes an animated windmill and instantly begins to turn, a line from its head to its tail being the axis." After Wilbur demonstrated the method, Orville noted, "From this it was apparent that the wings of a machine of the Chanute double-deck type, with the fore-and-aft trussing removed, could be warped in like manner, so that in flying the wings on the right and left sides could be warped so as to present their surfaces to the air at different angles of incidence and thus secure unequal lifts on the two sides."

Birds visibly use wing warping to achieve control. This was a significant influence on early aircraft designers. The Wright brothers were the first group to use warping wings. Their first plane mimicked the bird's flight patterns and wing form.

In practice, since most wing warping designs involved flexing of structural members, they were difficult to control and liable to cause structural failure. Ailerons had begun to replace wing warping as the most common means of achieving lateral control as early as 1911, especially in biplane designs. Monoplane wings of the period were much more flexible, and proved more amenable to wing warping – but even for monoplane designs, ailerons became the norm after 1915.

Lateral (roll) control in early aircraft was problematic at best. An overly flexible, involuntarily twisting wing can cause involuntary rolling, but even worse, it can convert attempts at correction, either from wing warping or ailerons, into a counteracting "servo tab" effect. Once this was fully understood, wing structures were made progressively more rigid, precluding wing warping altogether – and aircraft became far more controllable in the lateral plane.

Current technology has allowed scientists to revisit the concept of wing warping (also known as morphing wings).

== Applications ==
Wing warping was a common feature of early aircraft, including:

- The Albatross (1868)
- The Wright Flyer (1903)
- The Santos-Dumont Demoiselle (1907), the first homebuilt.
- The Antoinette V (1908), a wing-warping variant of the Antoinette IV
- The Blériot XI (1909), which made the first flight across a major body of water, namely the English Channel.
- The Etrich Taube (1910) originally used a cable-warped horizontal stabilizer to give elevator functionality as well
- The Nieuport IV (1911) racing and sport monoplane used for the first loop.
- The Bristol Coanda Monoplanes (1912), whose structural failures (along with those of a Deperdussin monoplane) led to a ban on monoplanes with the Royal Flying Corps.
- The early versions of the Royal Aircraft Factory B.E.2 (1912) used wing warping, while the "C" variant and later used ailerons.
- The Morane-Saulnier L (1913), the first fighter aircraft, and the first to shoot down another aircraft.
- The Morane-Saulnier N (1914), a World War I French scout derived from the previous G and H
- The Caudron G.4 (1915), a French biplane with twin engines.
- The Fokker Eindecker (1915), the first German fighter aircraft.
- The Fokker D.III (1916), one of the last operational fighters with wing warping.
- The Christmas Bullet (1919), whose wing warping and unbraced sprung steel spars contributed to its notoriety.

== Modern re-assessment ==
Several of the reproduction planes built for the film Those Magnificent Men in Their Flying Machines used the wing warping control systems of the original aircraft – with mixed results. The wing warping of the Avro Triplane proved surprisingly successful, whereas on the reproduction Antoinette, with its very flexible wing, wing warping offered little effective lateral control. Since the original Antoinette-style ailerons would have probably been even less effective, unobtrusive "modern" ailerons were inserted – even with these, lateral control remained very poor.

Wing morphing is a modern-day extension of wing warping in which the aerodynamic shape of the wing is modified under computer control. Research into this field is mainly conducted by NASA such as with the Mission Adaptive Wing (MAW) trialed from 1985 on the General Dynamics–Boeing AFTI/F-111A Aardvark.

Many major companies and scientists are working on developing morphing wings. NASA is working to develop a morphing wing made of cells that will twist to mimic birds. The cells NASA is using to construct the wing are small black modules consisting of carbon fiber. Currently, NASA is focusing on unmanned drones.

The appeal of shape-changing wings lies in the gapless and smooth nature of the resulting geometries. In contrast to conventional wings, relying on discrete, moveable parts (ailerons, flaps, slats...) to achieve variations of their shape – and hence of their aerodynamic properties – morphing wings attain these geometrical variations with continuous deformations of their outer surface. The absence of discrete curvature changes and of gaps has the potential of reducing the shape drag associated to the wing, thus increasing their aerodynamic efficiency. This characteristic makes adaptive wings well-suited to operate at various different operational conditions, as they can optimally adapt their shape and thus minimize the resulting drag.

== See also ==
- Edson Gallaudet - the first person to experiment with warped wings in 1896.
- Aileron
- M. P. W. Boulton, the British inventor (1868) of the aileron
- Elevon – a combination elevator/aileron used on Bleriot's earliest designs and more recently on flying wing and delta wing aircraft.
- Sport kite
