= Leonard E. Opdycke =

American aviation historian and author (1929–2023)

- Born: Leonard Emerson Opdycke; 22 May 1929; Boston, Massachusetts
- Died: 23 February 2023 (aged 93); Poughkeepsie, New York
- Education: University of Rochester

Leonard E. Opydycke (May 22, 1929 – February 23, 2023) was an American historian, editor, and author, who specialized in pre-WWII aviation history.

== Biography ==
Leonard Emerson Opdycke was born in Boston, Massasscusetts in 1929. His education included earning an undergraduate degree in English, in 1951 from Harvard College, and in 1965 a Master's degree in Psycholinguistics from the University of Rochester.

He is best known for being the founding editor of two magazines dealing with early aviation;

- World War 1 Aeroplanes, established in 1961, focused on aviation covering the period up to the end of World War I.
- Skyways, established in 1987, covered aviation between the years 1920 and 1940.

In 1999, Opdycke's book French Aeroplanes Before the Great War was published. This was the result of more than 15 years of research, initially with Michel Bénichou, editor of Le Fana de l'aviation, but then as an individual endeavor.

== Publications ==
- — (1999). French Aeroplanes Before the Great War. Atglen, PA: Schiffer Military. ISBN 9780764307522.
