= Antoinette 8V =

V8 piston aircraft engine

8V
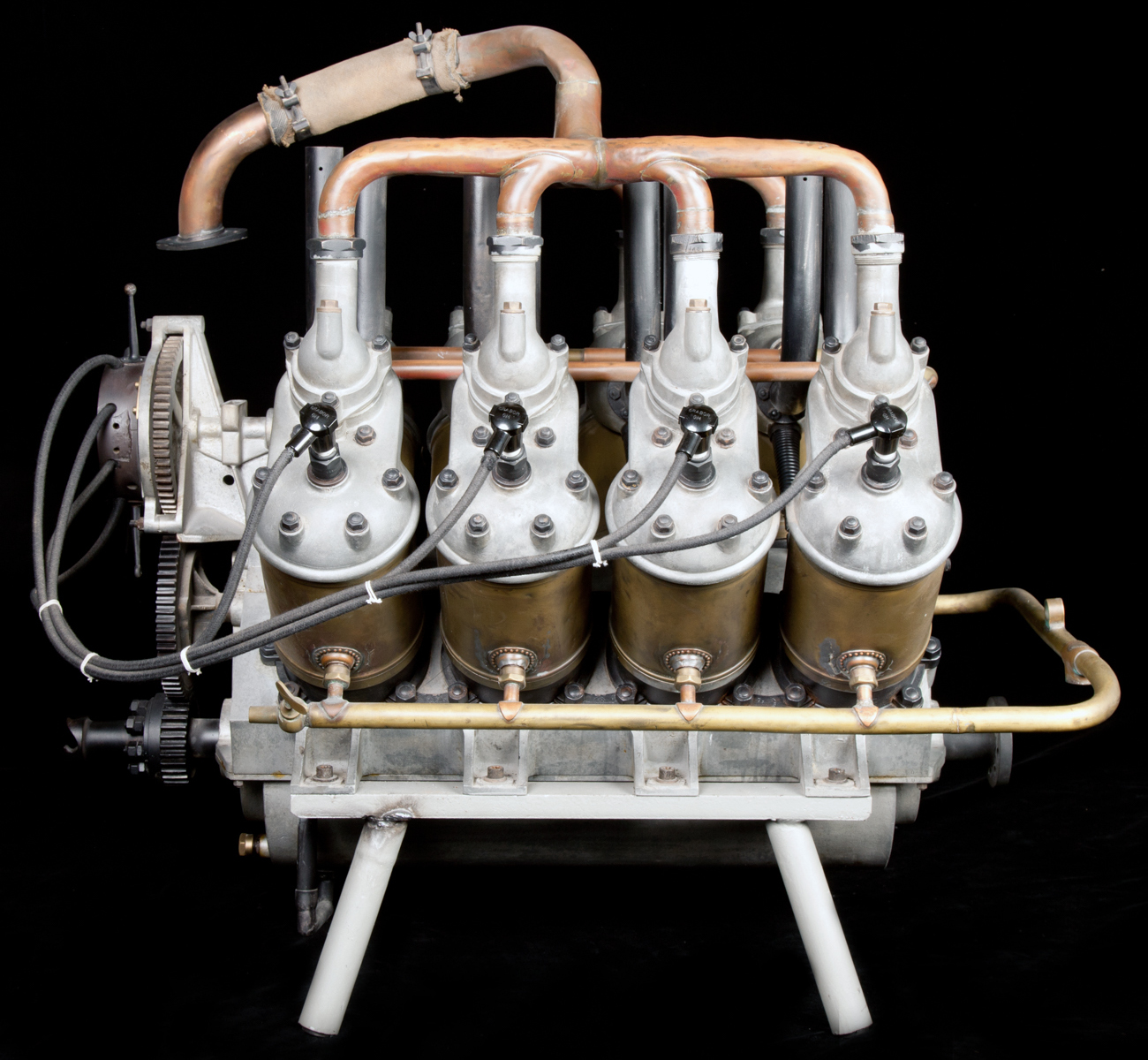
- Antoinette 8V exhibited at the Museo Nazionale della Scienza, Milan
- Type: V8 aero engine
- National origin: France
- Manufacturer: Antoinette
- Designer: Léon Levavasseur
- First run: end of 1902

The Antoinette 8V was an early French eight-cylinder, liquid-cooled, V engine, the first series production gasoline-fueled manifold injection engine with spark plug ignition of any kind. It was typically rated at 37 kW (50 hp).

The engine was designed in 1902 by Léon Levavasseur with financial backing by Jules Gastambide, named after Gastambide's daughter. On 28 August 1902, Levavasseur applied for a secret patent which became public on 28 August 1903 and was granted French patent no 399,068 on 30 September 1904.

From 1904 through 1906, Levavasseur’s engines powered a number of motorboats that achieved various distance speed records. They were built as V16 or V24, too.

The V8 was used on a number of early French aircraft, including Alberto Santos Dumont's 14 Bis of 1906 and the Antoinette company's own Antoinette VII.

== Specifications (Antoinette 8V) ==
Data for: Antoinette 8V

=== General characteristics ===
- Type: 8-cylinder liquid-cooled V engine
- Bore: 110 mm (4.33 in)
- Stroke: 105 mm (4.13 in)
- Displacement: 8.0 L (487 cu in)
- Length: 1,120 mm (44 in)
- Width: 630 mm (25 in)
- Height: 540 mm (21 in)
- Dry weight: 95 kg (209 lb)

=== Components ===
- Valvetrain: intake over exhaust
- Fuel system: fuel injection
- Cooling system: Liquid-cooled

=== Performance ===
- Power output: 37 kW (50 hp) at 1,100 RPM
- Power-to-weight ratio: 0.4 kW/kg (0.24 hp/lb)

== See also ==
Related lists

- List of aircraft engines
