= Fedor Ivanovich Bylinkin =

Fedor Ivanovich Bylinkin was an aircraft designer and builder in Russia before World War I. He designed and built a monoplane in 1910 similar to the Antoinette VI which succeeded in reaching 200 m of flight. A later biplane design proved a failure.

Bylinkin had earlier joined with Igor Sikorsky to design a biplane featuring a 15 hp Anzani engine in pusher configuration. This design was later rebuilt to address a lack of power, installing a 25 hp Anzani in a tractor configuration. This design, dubbed the BIS-2, was flown for the first time by Sikorsky on 3 June 1910. Maximum distance achieved by this design was 600 m and maximum flight time was 42 seconds.

Summary of aircraft built by F. I. Bylinkin
Model name	First flight	Number built	Type
BIS-2	1910	1	Experimental
Bylinkin monoplane	1910	1	Experimental
Bylinkin biplane	1910	1	Experimental
