= Léon Levavasseur =

French engineer, aircraft designer and inventor (1863–1922)

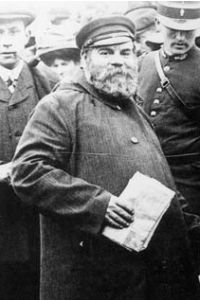
- Born: 8 January 1863; Le Mesnil-au-Val, Cherbourg, France
- Died: 26 February 1922 (aged 59); Puteaux, France
- Occupations: Inventor and engineer
- Known for: Inventing the V8 engine Design and manufacture of aircraft engines Design and manufacture of fixed-wing aircraft Levavasseur project Levavasseur whistle

Léon Levavasseur (8 January 1863 – 26 February 1922) was a French powerplant engineer, aircraft designer and inventor. His innovations included the V8 engine, direct fuel injection, and liquid engine cooling. Primarily associated with the Antoinette company, he continued to experiment with aircraft design after the company went bankrupt.

== Early life ==
Levavasseur was born in Le Mesnil-au-Val, Cherbourg, France to a naval officer. Initially studying fine arts, Levavasseur switched to studying engineering, with a particular interest in arc lamps and petrol engines.

== The Antoinette company ==
=== The engine enterprise and incorporation ===
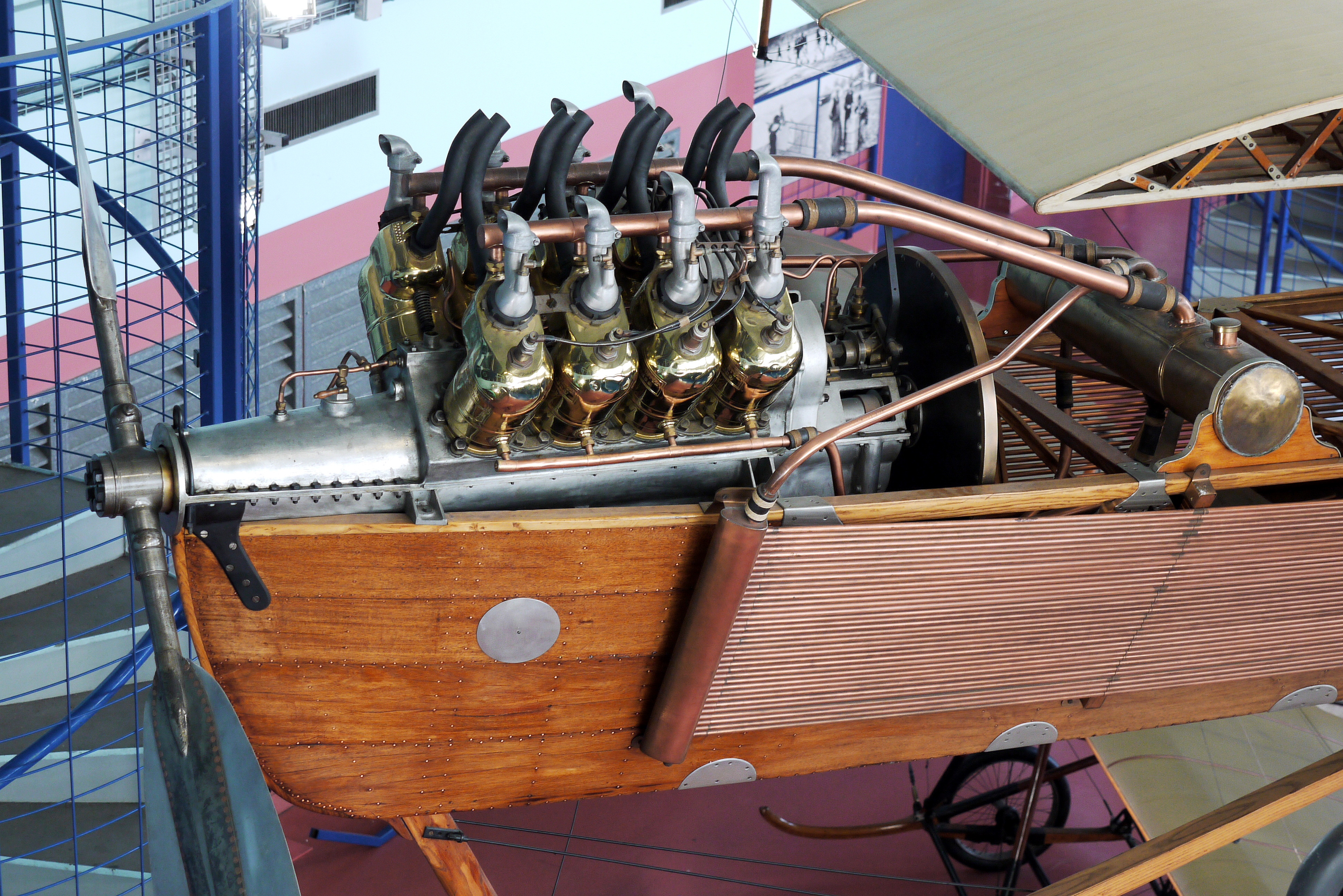
1909 Antoinette VII aircraft with Antoinette, the world's first V8 engine

In the summer of 1902, Levavasseur suggested to industrialist Jules Gastambide that powerful, lightweight engines would be necessary for powered flight, and proposed the manufacture of these engines. He also proposed that the engines be named after Gastambide's daughter, Antoinette. Gastambide financed the venture. Levavasseur patented the V8 engine configuration that year. By 1904, most of the prize-winning speedboats in Europe were powered with Antoinette engines. During this time, he designed engines of various configurations of up to thirty-two cylinders.

The Antoinette company was incorporated in 1906, with Gastambide as president and Levavasseur as technical director. The vice-president was aviation pioneer Louis Blériot. The company's primary business was the sale of engines to aircraft builders.

Levavasseur's Antoinette engines often included advanced features, including direct fuel injection and liquid engine cooling.

=== Aircraft manufacture ===
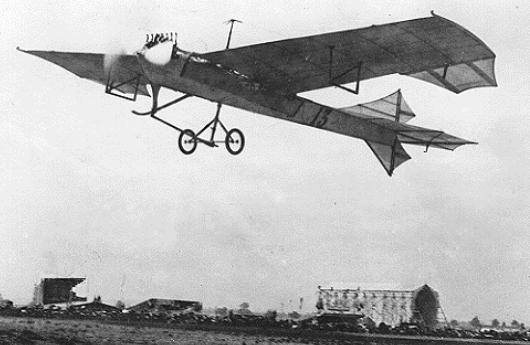
Antoinette IV designed by Levavasseur in 1908

Levavasseur experimented with the construction of aircraft and in 1906 the Antoinette company was contracted to build an aircraft for Captain Ferdinand Ferber. Blériot tried to dissuade the directors of Antoinette from becoming aircraft manufacturers, fearing that they would begin competing against their own customers. Blériot left the company when his advice was ignored.

=== Aircraft promotion with Hubert Latham ===
In the spring of 1909, Antoinette pilot Hubert Latham made several impressive flights. This convinced Levavasseur that Latham could cross the English Channel in an Antoinette aircraft and win the Daily Mail prize for doing so. Latham made two attempts to cross the English Channel in July 1909, both of which were unsuccessful due to engine failure while over the Channel. Between Latham's attempts, former Antoinette vice-president Blériot successfully crossed the Channel in his own aircraft. That month, Levavasseur was made a Chevalier of the Legion of Honour.

Latham's efforts to promote Levavasseur's Antoinette products were more successful at the Grande Semaine d'Aviation de la Champagne on 22–29 August 1909 at Reims, France, where he won the altitude prize, finished second in the speed competition, took third place in the Gordon Bennett Cup for aeroplanes, and, in the Grand Prix event, trying to fly the longest distance around the circuit in a single uninterrupted flight, he won second prize in one aircraft (an Antoinette IV) and fifth prize in another (an Antoinette VII).

=== Turbulent times and the end of Antoinette ===
Levavasseur left the Antoinette company in November 1909. He returned to the company as the technical director in March 1910. After his return, he designed the Antoinette military monoplane, known as the Monobloc, a streamlined monoplane with cantilever wings. Due to its enormous weight and underpowered engine, it was unable to take off during the 1911 military trials held at Reims and was rejected by the military. The Antoinette company went bankrupt shortly afterward.

== After Antoinette ==
Levavasseur began working on an aircraft with variable wing surface in late 1918. The variable area wing design won Levavasseur a "Safety in Aeroplanes" prize and was later acquired by the French government.

Levavasseur died in poverty in February 1922.
