= Howard Wright 1910 Monoplane =

General information
- National origin: United Kingdom
- Manufacturer: Howard T. Wright
- Designer: W.O. Manning

History
- First flight: 1910
- Variant: Howard Wright 1909 Monoplane Scottish Aeroplane Syndicate Avis

The Howard Wright 1910 Monoplane was an early British aircraft. It was one of a series of similar designs built by Wright, then one of Englands foremost aircraft engineers, between 1909 and 1910. Three of these were on display at the 1910 Aero show at Olympia. The noted English pioneer aviator and aircraft designer Thomas Sopwith learnt to fly in an example.

== Development ==
The Howard Wright 1910 monoplane was one of a series of similar aircraft designed by W.O. Manning for Howard T. Wright during 1909 and 1910. The 1910 monoplane was built for Wright's brother Warwick and was shown at the 1910 Aero Exhibition in London, where two other similar aircraft designed by Manning for Wright were also on display.

In common with the other aircraft the 1910 Monoplane was a tractor monoplane with an uncovered wire-braced wood fuselage. It was powered by 40 hp (30 kW) E.N.V. water-cooled engine. The fabric-covered wooden wings were mounted on the upper longerons of the fuselage, which tapered to a horizontal knife-edge at the tail, carrying a rectangular rudder and a fixed horizontal stabiliser with tip elevators at each end. In order to reduce drag, the wing bracing used flat steel ribbons rather than wires, the struts of the undercarriage were of streamline section, and a polished aluminium spinner was fitted to the wooden propeller. The twin radiators were positioned over the inner end of each wing, being curved to follow the wing section. The aircraft was exhibited at the 1910 Aero Exhibition at Olympia, after which it was taken to the Royal Aero Club's flying field at Eastchurch for testing, where it first flew on 3 April piloted by Warwick Wright.

== Operational history ==
The prototype was wrecked when Warwick Wright swerved to avoid spectators while landing at Brooklands and ran into a boulder at the edge of the airfield, tearing the undercarriage off: the fuselage, wings and pilot continuing onwards, coming to rest in the adjoining sewage farm.

At the same time a second example was being flown by G. Ll. Hinds Howell, who was employed by Warwick Wright's car business. This differed slightly in having a full-span elevator and a block radiator below the engine. This aircraft was first flown on 26 March 1910

In October 1910 a third aircraft was bought, and immediately damaged, by Thomas Sopwith, who upon delivery of the aircraft to Brooklands made brief taxying trials and then stalled on his first attempted takeoff. Sopwith was unhurt and the aircraft suffered only minor damage. Sopwith managed considerably better on his next attempt a few days later, but a cylinder head burst on 4 November and Sopwith sold the aircraft, buying a biplane which was also manufactured by Wright.

== Specifications ==
Data from Ransom, S. and Fairclough, F. English Electric Aircraft and their Predecessors, p.

General characteristics

- Crew: 1
- Length: 29 ft (8.8 m)
- Wingspan: 27 ft (8.2 m)
- Wing area: 160 sq ft (15 m^{2})
- Empty weight: 450 lb (204 kg)
- Gross weight: 605 lb (274 kg)
- Powerplant: 1 × E.N.V. 'D' water-cooled V8, 40 hp (30 kW)

Performance

- Cruise speed: 35 mph (56 km/h, 30 kn)

== See also ==
Related development

- Howard Wright 1909 Monoplane
- Scottish Aeroplane Syndicate Avis

Aircraft of comparable role, configuration, and era

- Bleriot XII
- Deperdusssin Type A
