= E.N.V. Motor Syndicate =

E.N.V. Motor Syndicate Ltd.
- Industry: Mechanical engineering
- Founded: 1908
- Defunct: 1968
- Fate: Ceased engine manufacture about 1914 other business ended 1968
- Headquarters: Sheffield, Courbevoie, Paris, Willesden (1909 onwards)
- Products: Aircraft engines (1908-1914), camshafts, bevel gears

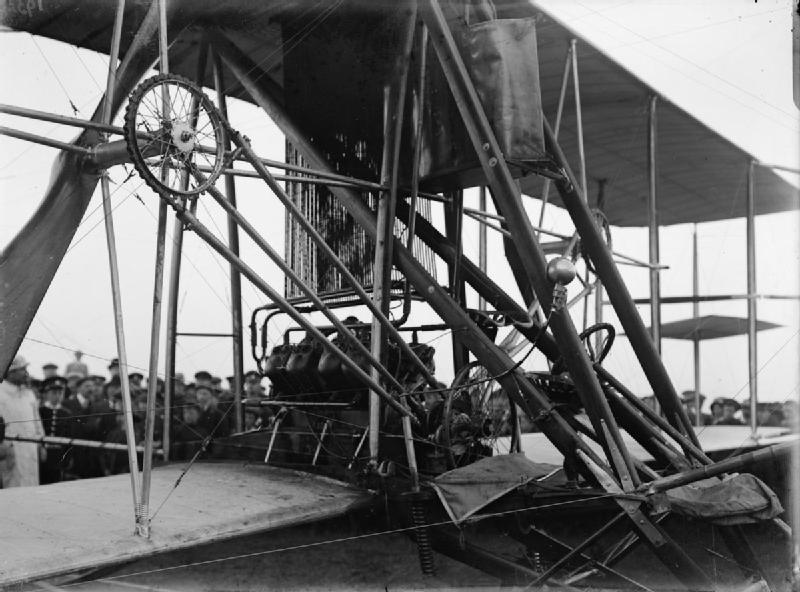
A close up of the ENV engine installation in the Cody Mark IC Cathedral

E.N.V. was an early manufacturer of aircraft engines, originally called the London and Parisian Motor Company, their first model appearing in 1908. E.N.V. engines were used by several pioneer aircraft builders and were produced in both France and the UK until about 1914. They subsequently specialised in camshafts and bevel gear manufacture until 1968 when the name was lost.

== The company ==
The London and Parisian Motor Co. was an Anglo-French venture registered in London in 1908 and largely backed with British capital and expertise. The castings and forgings for its engines were made in Sheffield where the company was originally based, then taken to France for assembly. The reason for this was that there was much more aeronautical activity in France than in England in 1908, but the French were taxing imported machinery. The French works were in Courbevoie in the Paris suburbs.

By 1909 there was more aviation activity in England and E.N.V. decided to begin full manufacture at home, at Willesden, London. At that time a separate company was formed to produce the aero-engines in Willesden, The E.N.V. Motor Syndicate Ltd. E.N.V. was a contraction of French phrase "en-V" ("in a V"), which was a common name at the time for a V-engine. Indeed, most of their engines were in fact 90° V-8s — the idea for the V8 engine itself originated with French engineer Leon Levavasseur in 1902. All of E.N.V.'s V8 engines were water-cooled. The first two models were powerful but heavy, while the later "D" and "F" types were lighter yet reliable, with power ratings of 37 hp (26 kW) and 74 hp (51 kW) respectively.

These were widely used from 1909 in both Britain and France; in England well known pioneers like S.F. Cody, A.V. Roe, Claude Grahame-White, Moore-Brabazon and T.O.M. Sopwith used them. In France, pioneers such as Henri Rougier, Pierre de Caters, Arthur Duray and Rene Metrot won prizes flying E.N.V. powered Voisin aircraft, and other French manufacturers like Farman and Antoinette used E.N.V.s in some of their machines.

After about mid-1911, these water-cooled engines began to fall out of favour, superseded by the much lighter air-cooled radial engines from Anzani and in particular by the high-performing newcomer, the rotary engine, introduced by the Gnome et Rhône company. A good power-to-weight ratio was rather less critical for use in airship installations, and several used E.N.V. engines. The 100 hp (75 kW) V-8 submitted to the Naval and Military Aero Engine Contest of 1914 proved to have serious design flaws and as a result of its failure E.N.V withdrew from engine production.

== E.N.V. Motors ==
E.N.V. Motors was incorporated on 30 May 1919 which then acquired on 3 June 1919 the engineering business of Joseph Frederick Laycock who traded under the name of E.N.V. Motor Company at Willesden. The property and assets were acquired for £45,000 and new company invested in new plant and machinery including building a new factory for manufacturing of gearboxes and camshafts for engines and in particular spiral bevel gears. In 1928 the company changed name to E.N.V. Engineering Company Limited.

The company continued successful production of bevel gears and camshafts for another 50 years; it produced individual components for several World War I aircraft and tank engines, and after the war built complete gearboxes for the automobile industry. In 1964 it became part of the Eaton, Yale and Towne group, losing its identity in 1968.

== London & Parisian - Motor cars ==
The London & Parisian were agents and sole concessionaire for the French Hotchkiss and Delage motor cars which it displayed at the Olympia Motor Show from 1909. The company was closed down in 1929.

== Engines ==
E.N.V.'s V-8 engines appeared in six different models. Most of these were identified by a letter, though contemporary sources often refer to them by power. The assignment of the letters C, D, F and T is known from contemporary sources. The one type known to have pre-dated the C has been assigned the letter A by a later historian, a notation followed here. The last engine is usually known as the "1914 100 hp E.N.V". The physical details of all the engines, such as bore and stroke etc. are known from both contemporary records and surviving examples. There were also variations within types, as development proceeded. Nonetheless, all the V-8s had much in common. They all had their cylinder banks separated by 90°, leaving space within the V for inlet manifolds and valvegear. All were water-cooled; each cylinder was enclosed with an electrolytically formed copper jacket. Initially these were produced with a variant of the lost wax process. The cylinders were coated with wax, which was then coated with black lead to make it electrically conductive and copper plated. Afterwards the wax was removed by heating. Later, the insulating wax was replaced with electrically conducting, low melting point white metal, simplifying the process. Pistons were made of steel, with cast iron rings, and the crankcases were cast aluminium. There was one plug per cylinder, supplied by a gear-driven magneto alone or with an additional battery-driven ignition coil and distributor for dual ignition.

The types A, C, D and F were all side-valve engines, with valves operated by push rods running exposed and parallel to the cylinder axes, driven within the V from a central, gear-driven camshaft above the crankshaft. All camshafts were hollow for lubrication. The cylinder cooling jackets surrounded the cylinders, then turned inward with flattened faces for inlet and exhaust manifolds and push rods. The exhaust stubs were vertical, each bank of cylinders feeding its own horizontal pipe. The inlet stubs entered the cylinder head at right angles. The earliest type A engines had a pair of inlet tubes, one for each bank and fed from a carburettor at the front. Slightly later model As and types C and F placed the carburettor between the cylinder banks, halfway along the engine axis. Fuel and air was passed to a spherical copper mixing chamber above the carburettor, then via four radial copper tubes which finally branched into pairs the feed the inlet ports symmetrically. The smaller type D retained the end positioned carburettor. These engines all had cast iron cylinders. The types A and C were very similar in construction as well as capacity, but a major change in crankshaft design was introduced with the smaller type D and inherited by the F. The A and C types had a crankshaft supported by only three plain bearings and the width of the central one required a greater space between the second and third cylinder of each bank, visibly dividing each into blocks of two. The crankshafts of the D and F types had five ball race bearings, one between each cylinder and two end bearings; the output thrust bearing was a double race to allow for pusher or tractor configurations. The new bearing arrangement permitted an equal cylinder spacing. The type FA was a type F with an extended crankshaft, mounted in a very prominent, conical crankcase extension. The type T had a similar extension, which in that case at least allowed a larger diameter thrust bearing to be used.

Though heavy, the E.N.V. models A and C provided some of the earliest European fliers with a relatively powerful engine. Some Voisin biplanes used them between 1908 and 1910 and Samuel Franklin Cody fitted his first pusher biplane with a type C in the second half of 1909. His second aircraft also used that engine in the autumn of 1910. The types D and F had significantly better power-to-weight ratios than the first two models and become E.N.V.'s most popular products, being widely used in 1910 and 1911. After that they were eclipsed by the new, light rotary engines.

The last two V8's, the T and the 100 hp (75 kW) were not successful. Though tested, they never flew. The type T introduced steel cylinders and was an overhead-valve engine with vertically mounted valves operated from a central camshaft by thin pull rods and rockers. The carburettor was mounted centrally at the front, feeding a central tube which ran to the back of the engine, divided and ran back along each cylinder bank. Dual magneto/coil and battery ignition was provided. The 100 hp (75 kW) engine was also an overhead-valve engine in the sense that the port opened directly into the cylinder head, though the valves were mounted horizontally. This arrangement required an unusual shape of combustion chamber but enabled the valves to be operated directly from a central crankshaft raised on pillars to cylinder head height. Vibrations of this crankshaft and weakness of a new cylinder head restraint system dogged the engine, the last E.N.V. made.

The three horizontally opposed, four-cylinder, overhead-valve engines that appeared at aircraft shows between October 1909-10 were E.N.V.'s only departure from their standard 90° V8 layout. Technical details are sparse, but the 1909 engine had steel cylinders and combined inlet/exhaust valves. The 30 hp 1910 engine had separate steel cylinder heads and barrels, screwed and brazed together. Inlet and exhaust valves were also separated, placed respectively below and above the cylinders and worked by push/pull rods and rockers. Only one of these horizontal engines flew, powering the Neale Monoplane of 1909-10 at Brooklands for a short time.

Production records have been lost, but probably 100-200 E.N.V. engines were made.

90° V-8 engines
Type	Year	Power	Maximum power	Valve configuration	Capacity (cc)	Bore×Stroke (mm)	Weight (kg)	Manufactured in
A	1908	50 hp (37 kW) at 1,000 rpm	60 hp (45 kW)	side	8,171	100×130	200	France
C	1908-9	65 hp (48 kW) at 1,180 rpm	90 hp (67 kW) for 15 min claimed	side	8,171	100×130	170	France
D	1909-10	30 hp (22 kW) at 1,000 rpm	40 hp (30 kW) at 1,400 rpm	side	4,087	85×90	70	France + UK
F, FA	1909-11	59 hp (44 kW) at 1,000 rpm	88 hp (66 kW) at 1,500 rpm	side	7,623	105×110	130	France + UK (FA France only)
T	1910-11	100 hp (75 kW) at 1,000 rpm		overhead	15,934	130×150	238	
	1914	100 hp (75 kW) at 1,620 rpm		overhead	7,494	95×165	204 with radiator	UK

4-cylinder horizontally opposed, OHV engines
Type	Year	Power	Capacity (cc)	Bore×Stroke (mm)	Weight (kg)	Manufactured in
25/30 hp	1909	24 hp (18 kW) at 1,200 rpm	4,100	109×110	30	France
H	1910	30 hp (22 kW) at 1,200 rpm	2,300	90×90	40 bare	
30 hp	1910	30 hp (22 kW)	3,050	80×120(?)	60	

== Applications ==
Aircraft
Type	Engine
Avro Type D	F
Avro Type E	F
Avro Duigan	D
B.E.2	F
Billing tractor biplane	D
Blériot XII	D, F, FA
Bristol Boxkite	F
Bristol Challenger-England	F
Cody British Army Aeroplane No 1	C
Cody Michelin Cup Biplane	C, F
Dufaux biplane	F
Farman pusher biplane	F
Fritz tractor monoplane	D
Grahame-White Blériot	F
Grahame-White Boxkite	F
Howard Wright 1910 monoplane	D, F
Howard Wright 1910 biplanes	F
Lane tractor monoplane	D
Molesworth tractor triplane	D
Mulliner 2 Knyplane	F
Neale tractor monoplane	H
Percival Parseval 1 tractor biplane	F
Perry Beadle flying boat	F
Piffard biplanes No.1-4	D
Sanders 2	F
Royal Aircraft Factory S.E.1	F
Short S.29	F
Skinner tractor monoplane	F
Swann tractor monoplane	D
Swann pusher biplane	D
Turcat-Mery-Rougier	F
Voisin 1907 biplane	A(?), C, F
Weiss No.2	D

Airships
	Engine
Duks JASTREB non-rigid	F
Izorsky GOLUB non-rigid	F
Marshall-Fox rigid	F
Moreing (Healey & Roberts) non-rigid	C
Willows No.5 non-rigid	F
Wellman non-rigid	F

== Notable flights and prizes ==
Aircraft powered by E.N.V engines, principally the type F, won considerable cash prizes at air meetings during 1909-10. At Heliopolis (near Cairo), in 1910, E.N.V. engines collected FF145,000 of the FF175,000 available prize money.

On 15 October 1910 Walter Wellman, a U.S. citizen, set out from Atlantic City to cross the Atlantic in a 345,000-cubic-foot (9,770 m^{3}) airship that he had built and named America. It had two engines, a 75 hp (56 kW) Lorraine-Dietrich and a 60 hp (45 kW) E.N.V. type F. The E.N.V was soon overheating and had to be shut down. After 69 hours of flight and having reached latitude 35°43′W and longitude 68°18′N and having covered a great circle distance of about 1,500 miles (2,400 km), they had to ditch, and the six crew were fortunate to be picked up unhurt by a passing steamer.

In December 1910, eleven pilots were preparing attempts on the £4,000 Baron de Forest prize for the longest single stage flight, including a crossing of the English Channel, by an Englishman in an all-British aircraft before the end of 1910. Nine of them were using E.N.V. engines. The prize was won by a newcomer to the British aviation scene, T.O.M. Sopwith, in an E.N.V. type F powered Howard Wright pusher biplane. He flew from Eastbourne on the southern coast of England to Beaumont, south of Charleroi in Belgium, a distance of 169 miles (272 km) on 18 December.

== Surviving engines ==
At least six E.N.V. engines are known to have survived. Four are in national museums: a D and an F in the Science Museum, London, an FA in the Musée de l'Air et de l'Espace at Le Bourget, Paris and an F in the National Technical Museum, Prague, though they may not all be on display. A type F, N/S 8, is on display in the Museo Militar de Aviación de la Fuerza Aérea Mexicana (Santa Lucía Air Base) in Mexico. A type F is on display in the United States, mounted in a replica Short S.27 and part of the Old Rhinebeck museum. Samuel Cody's type C is still in the possession of his family.
