= List of protected heritage sites in Beaumont, Belgium =

This table shows an overview of the protected heritage sites in the Walloon town Beaumont, Belgium. This list is part of Belgium's national heritage.

Object	Year/architect	Town/section	Address	Coordinates	Number^{?}	Image
The "Tour Salamandre" in property "Trinité Notre-Dame" ^{(nl)} ^{(fr)}		Beaumont	Beaumont	50.235299°N 4.234195°E	56005-CLT-0001-01 Info	De "Tour Salamandre" in het eigendom "Trinité Notre-Dame"
Chapel of Saint Julien l'Hospitalier, and the ensemble of the chapel, the parcel on which it is located and the road providing access ^{(nl)} ^{(fr)}		Beaumont	Beaumont	50.233082°N 4.234774°E	56005-CLT-0006-01 Info	Kapel Saint-Julien l'Hospitalier, en het ensemble van de kapel, het perceel waarop het zich bevindt en de weg die toegang biedt
Church of Saint-Lambert ^{(nl)} ^{(fr)}		Beaumont	Barbençon	50.220053°N 4.279419°E	56005-CLT-0007-01 Info	Kerk Saint-Lambert
Church of Saint-Martin-Chaudeville Leval, and the ensemble of the church and cemetery around it, including the surrounding wall ^{(nl)} ^{(fr)}		Beaumont		50.235591°N 4.209233°E	56005-CLT-0009-01 Info	Kerk Saint-Martin van Leval-Chaudeville, en het ensemble van de kerk en het kerkhof eromheen, inclusief de omringende muur
St. Martin's Church ^{(nl)} ^{(fr)}		Beaumont	Renlies	50.191824°N 4.265672°E	56005-CLT-0011-01 Info	
The facades and roofs of the building ^{(nl)} ^{(fr)}		Beaumont	rue de Binche n°6, Beaumont	50.238004°N 4.234723°E	56005-CLT-0013-01 Info	
The facades and roofs, including the barn, the Castle ^{(nl)} ^{(fr)}		Beaumont	Jettefeuille	50.236168°N 4.311236°E	56005-CLT-0014-01 Info	
Chapel of the Blessed Virgin ("Chapelle de la Vierge Sacrée) ^{(nl)} ^{(fr)}		Beaumont	Place de Géramont, Beaumont	50.188043°N 4.266911°E	56005-CLT-0015-01 Info	
Chapel of Our Lady of Seven Sorrows (Notre-Dame des Sept Douleurs) ^{(nl)} ^{(fr)}		Beaumont	Beaumont	50.191511°N 4.264423°E	56005-CLT-0016-01 Info	
Ensemble from the ramparts of the city of Beaumont ^{(nl)} ^{(fr)}		Beaumont		50.238013°N 4.233240°E	56005-CLT-0019-01 Info	Ensemble van de wallen van de stad Beaumont
Facades and roofs of the old vicarage ^{(nl)} ^{(fr)}		Beaumont	Beaumont	50.261238°N 4.234614°E	56005-CLT-0020-01 Info	
The potale from the 18th century at the crossroads of the rue des Trous and rue de l'Etang ^{(nl)} ^{(fr)}		Beaumont	Beaumont	50.218790°N 4.284228°E	56005-CLT-0021-01 Info	
Facades and roofs of the farm Peruque ^{(nl)} ^{(fr)}		Beaumont	Beaumont	50.222628°N 4.286795°E	56005-CLT-0022-01 Info	

== See also ==
- List of protected heritage sites in Hainaut (province)
- Beaumont, Belgium
