= Howard Wright 1909 Monoplane =

General information
- Type: Howard Wright 1909 Monoplane
- National origin: Britain
- Manufacturer: Howard T Wright
- Designer: W.O. Manning

History
- First flight: 1909

The Howard Wright 1909 Monoplane was the first of a series of tractor configuration monoplane aircraft built by Wright in England during 1909 and 1910. A variant, the Lascelles Ornis, was displayed at the 1910 Aero Show at Olympia in London.

== Development ==
In October 1909 Wright and Manning started work on a new tractor monoplane design. Unlike earlier aircraft, which had used steel tubing, the fuselage was constructed from wire-braced ash wood, but was otherwise similar, being a square-section box-girder tapering to a vertical knife-edge at the back. The tail-mounted control surfaces were similar to those of the Howard Wright Cooke Monoplane, consisting of a triangular rudder mounted on the sternpost and a rectangular horizontal stabiliser with tip-mounted elevators mounted below the lower longerons. The undercarriage was also similar to the Cooke aircraft, with a pair of mainwheels on sprung trailing arms and a large tailwheel. Wing warping was used for lateral control: this was controlled by a lever which also operated the elevator on one side of the cockpit, the rudder being operated by a lever on the other side. A 35 hp Lascelles 5-cylinder semi-radial air-cooled engine was probably fitted to the examples built, although any suitable engine could be installed.

Work was started on at least three airframes in an early effort to reduce costs by some measure of standardisation of design, and Wright claimed that he could deliver an aircraft within fourteen days of receiving an order. Although only a few of the type were built, it was quickly followed by a number of very similar aircraft.

The Lascelles Ornis, built for the Lascelles company and exhibited on their stand at the 1910 Aero Show at Olympia, differed in having a 2 ft (0.6 m) longer fuselage, a rectangular balanced rudder, and different control arrangements. It was fitted with a propeller made by José Weiss.

After the Olympia show the Ornis was bought by A.G. Power, who flew it at Brooklands during 1910.

== Specifications (Lascelles Ornis) ==
Data from English Electric Aircraft and their predecessors London: Putnam, 1987 ISBN 0-85177-806-2

General characteristics

- Crew: 1
- Length: 30 ft (9.1 m)
- Wingspan: 28 ft (8.5 m)
- Wing area: 154 sq ft (14.3 m^{2})
- Gross weight: 600 lb (272 kg)
- Powerplant: 1 × Lascelles 5-cylinder air-cooled semi-radial, 35 hp (26 kW)

Performance

- Maximum speed: 35 mph (56 km/h, 30 kn)

Related development

- Scottish Aeroplane Syndicate Avis
- Howard Wright 1910 Monoplane

Aircraft of comparable role, configuration, and era

- Blériot XI
- Deperdussin Type A
