= Thomas Sopwith =

English aviation pioneer

Sir Thomas Sopwith CBE, Hon FRAeS
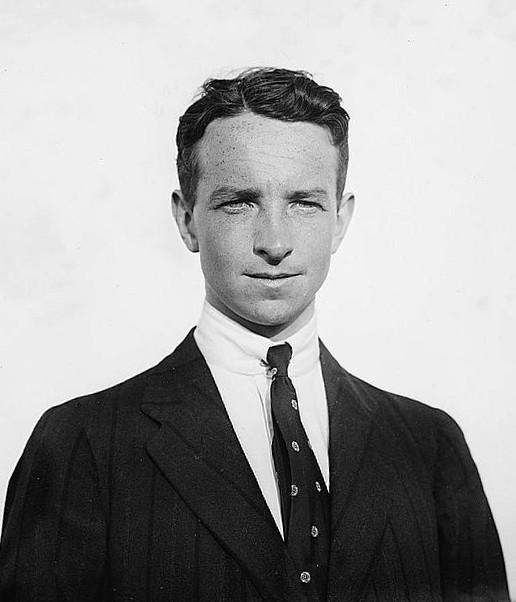
- Sopwith in 1911
- Born: Thomas Octave Murdoch Sopwith; 18 January 1888; Kensington, London, United Kingdom
- Died: 27 January 1989 (aged 101); Hampshire, United Kingdom
- Resting place: Little Somborne, United Kingdom
- Occupations: Aviator and businessman
- Years active: 1910–1980
- Organizations: Sopwith Aviation Company; Hawker Aircraft; Hawker Siddeley
- Spouses: Beatrix Hore-Ruthven (m. 1914; died 1930) Phyllis Brodie (m. 1932; died 1978)
- Children: Thomas E.B. Sopwith

Thomas Sopwith
Medal record

Representing United Kingdom

Men's ice hockey

European Championships
Gold medal – first place	1910	Great Britain

Sir Thomas Octave Murdoch Sopwith, CBE, Hon FRAeS (18 January 1888 – 27 January 1989) was a British aviation pioneer, businessman and yachtsman.

== Early life ==
Sopwith was born in Kensington, London, on 18 January 1888. He was the eighth child and only son of Thomas Sopwith (a civil engineer and managing director of the Spanish Lead Mines Company in Linares, Jaén, Spain) and his wife, Lydia Gertrude Messiter. He was a grandson of mining engineer Thomas Sopwith. He was educated at Cottesmore School in Hove and at Seafield Park engineering college in Hill Head.

On 30 July 1898, when he was ten years old and on a family holiday at the Isle of Lismore near Oban in Scotland, a gun lying across young Thomas's knee went off, killing his father. This accident haunted Sopwith for the rest of his life.

Sopwith was interested in motor cycles, and he took part in the 100-mile Tricar trial in 1904, where he was one of four medal winners. He also tried ballooning, his first ascent being in C.S. Rolls' balloon in June 1906. Together with Phil Paddon, he bought his own balloon from Short Brothers. For a while, he was in business with Phil Paddon selling automobiles as Paddon & Sopwith on Albemarle Street in Piccadilly, London.

In his youth, he was an expert ice skater and played in goal during the Princes Ice Hockey Club's 1908 match with C.P.P. Paris and during the 1909–10 season. He was also a member of the Great Britain national ice hockey team that won the gold medal at the first European Championships in 1910.

== Career in aviation ==
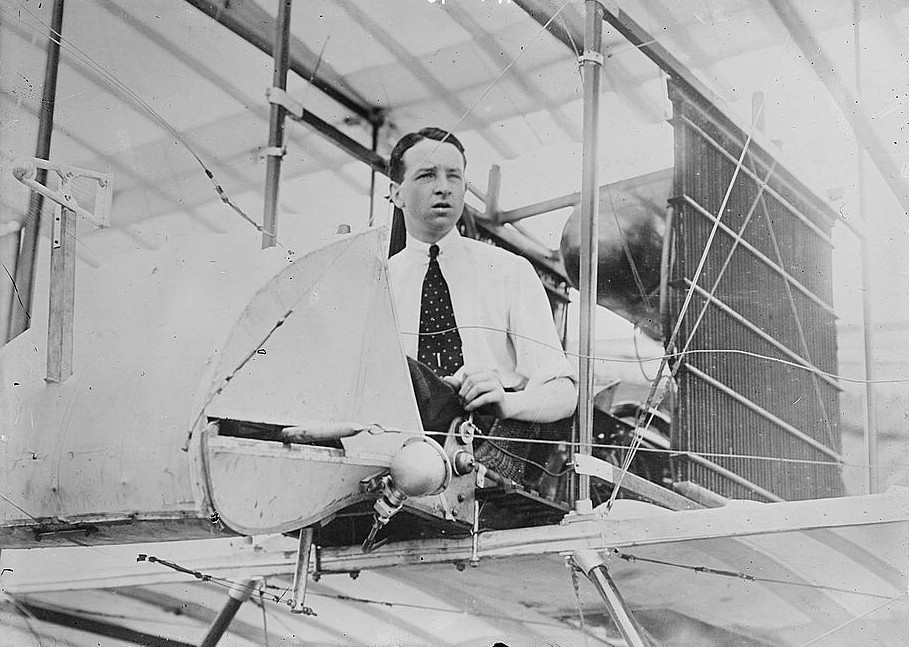
Thomas Sopwith at the controls of his Howard Wright 1910 Biplane

Sopwith became interested in flying after seeing John Moisant flying the first cross-Channel passenger flight. His first flight was with Gustave Blondeau in a Farman at Brooklands. He soon taught himself to fly on a Howard Wright Avis monoplane and took to the air on his own for the first time on 22 October 1910. He crashed after travelling about 300 yards (275 m), but soon improved, and on 22 November was awarded Royal Aero Club Aviation Certificate No. 31, flying a Howard Wright 1910 Biplane.

On 18 December 1910, Sopwith won the £4000 Baron de Forest Prize for the longest flight from England to the Continent in a British-built aeroplane, flying 169 miles (272 km) in 3 hours 40 minutes. He used the winnings to set up the Sopwith School of Flying at Brooklands.

On 28 June 1911, as the RMS Olympic was leaving New York City on her eastbound maiden voyage, Sopwith flew up to the Olympic, intending to drop a package of last minute supplies destined for passenger Washington Atlee Burpee. However, the package narrowly missed the deck, falling into the Hudson River.

In June 1912, Sopwith, along with Fred Sigrist and others, set up the Sopwith Aviation Company, initially at Brooklands. On 24 October 1912 using a Wright Model B completely rebuilt by Sopwith and fitted with an ABC 40 hp engine, Harry Hawker took the British Michelin Endurance prize with a flight of 8h 23m.

Sopwith Aviation got its first military aircraft order in November 1912, and in December moved to larger premises in Canbury Park Road, Kingston upon Thames. The site of the factory is now a private gated housing estate. A small section of the original building still exists at the junction of Elm Crescent and Canbury Park Road; white painted bay windows can be seen extending from the building to allow as much light as possible to enter the large room in which Sopwith made blueprints for his aircraft designs.

The company produced more than 18,000 World War I aircraft for the allied forces, including 5747 of the Sopwith Camel single-seat fighter. Sopwith was awarded the CBE in 1918.

Bankrupted after the war by punitive anti-profiteering taxes and a failed venture into motorcycle manufacturing, he re-entered the aviation business in 1920 with a new firm named after his chief engineer and test pilot, Harry Hawker. Sopwith became chairman of the new firm, Hawker Aircraft.

He became a Knight Bachelor in 1953. After the nationalisation in 1977 of the aviation interests of what was by then Hawker Siddeley, he continued to work as a consultant to the company until 1980.

In 1979, Sopwith was inducted into the International Air & Space Hall of Fame at the San Diego Air & Space Museum. He was a member of the Air Squadron flying club.

== Yachting ==
Sopwith challenged the America's Cup with his J-class yachts, Endeavour, in 1934, and with Endeavour II in 1937. Both yachts were designed by Charles E. Nicholson. Sopwith funded, organised and helmed the yachts, and came close to winning the cup in 1934. He was inducted into the America's Cup Hall of Fame in 1995.

In 1927 Sopwith commissioned yacht builders Camper and Nicholsons to build a luxury motor yacht he named Vita. She was sold in 1929 to Sir John Shelley-Rolls who renamed her Alastor. During World War II the Royal Navy commandeered her to ferry provisions to Navy vessels moored at the entrance to Strangford Lough. In 1946 a fire gutted her and she sank in Ringhaddy Sound in Strangford Lough.

In 1937 Sopwith received the yacht Philante, also built for him by Camper and Nicholsons. In the Second World War the ship was requisitioned by the Royal Navy and used as a convoy escort vessel, HMS Philante. After the war the vessel was returned to Sopwith and he sold her to Norway in 1947, to become the royal yacht of the King of Norway.

== Personal life ==
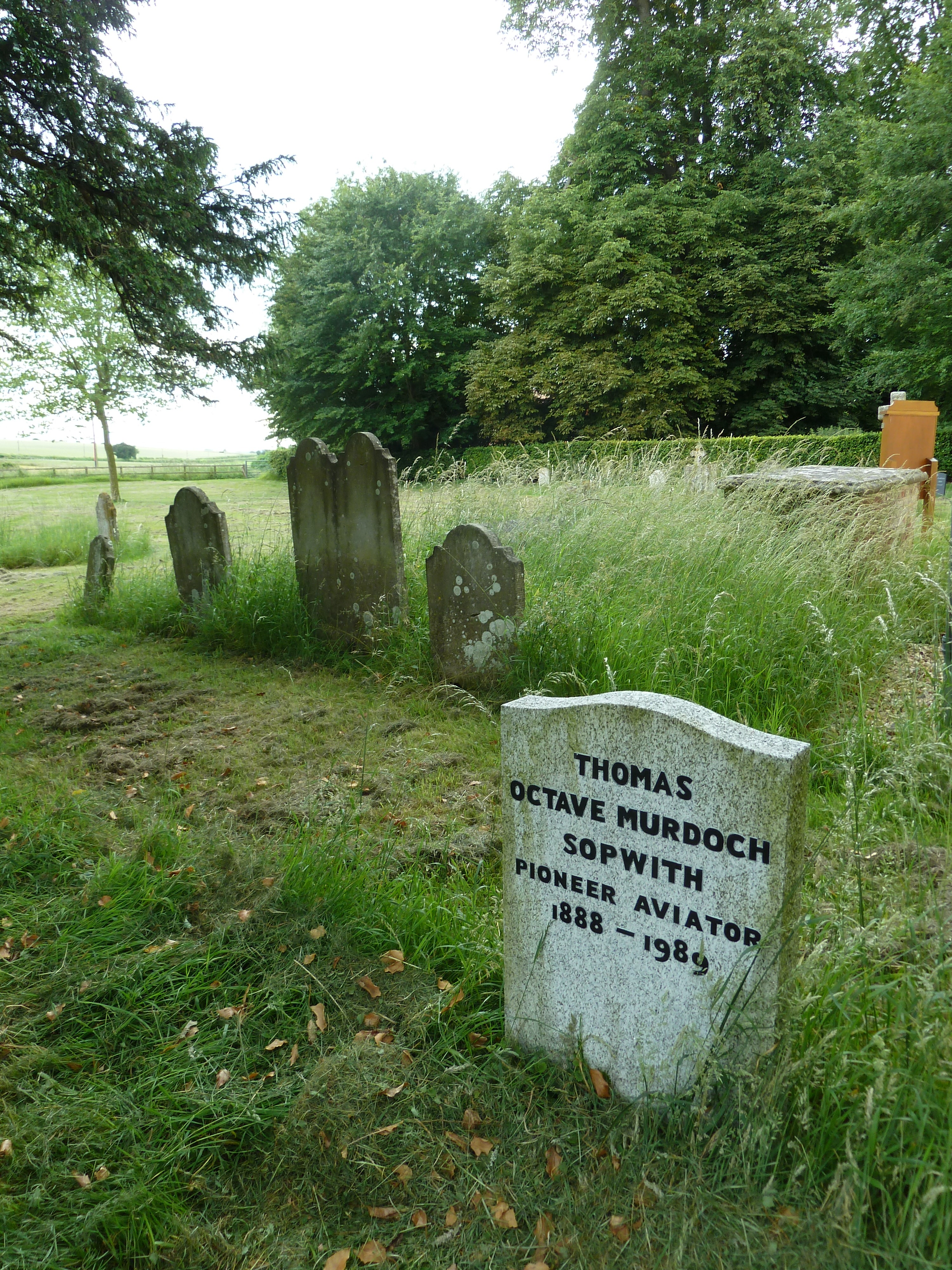
Sopwith's gravestone in Little Somborne

Sopwith married Beatrice Hore-Ruthven (1871–1930) in 1914; they had no children. Beatrice was the daughter of Walter Hore-Ruthven, who was created Baron Ruthven of Gowrie in 1919. From 1914 to 1920 Sopwith lived in Cobham, Surrey where a blue plaque commemorates his residence.

After Beatrice's death, he married Phyllis Brodie Gordon (1892–1978) in 1932. They had one son, Thomas Edward Brodie Sopwith, who had success in car racing.

Sopwith's house in Mayfair at No. 46 Green Street, where he lived from 1934 until 1940, also has a blue plaque. In 1940, he moved to Warfield Hall in Berkshire, which he had acquired the previous year.

Sopwith's 100th birthday was marked by a flypast of military aircraft over his home, Compton Manor in King's Somborne, Hampshire. He died in Hampshire on 27 January 1989, nine days after his 101st birthday. His grave and that of his second wife (Phyllis Brodie) are in the churchyard of All Saints Church, Little Somborne, near Winchester.

== Legacy and tributes ==
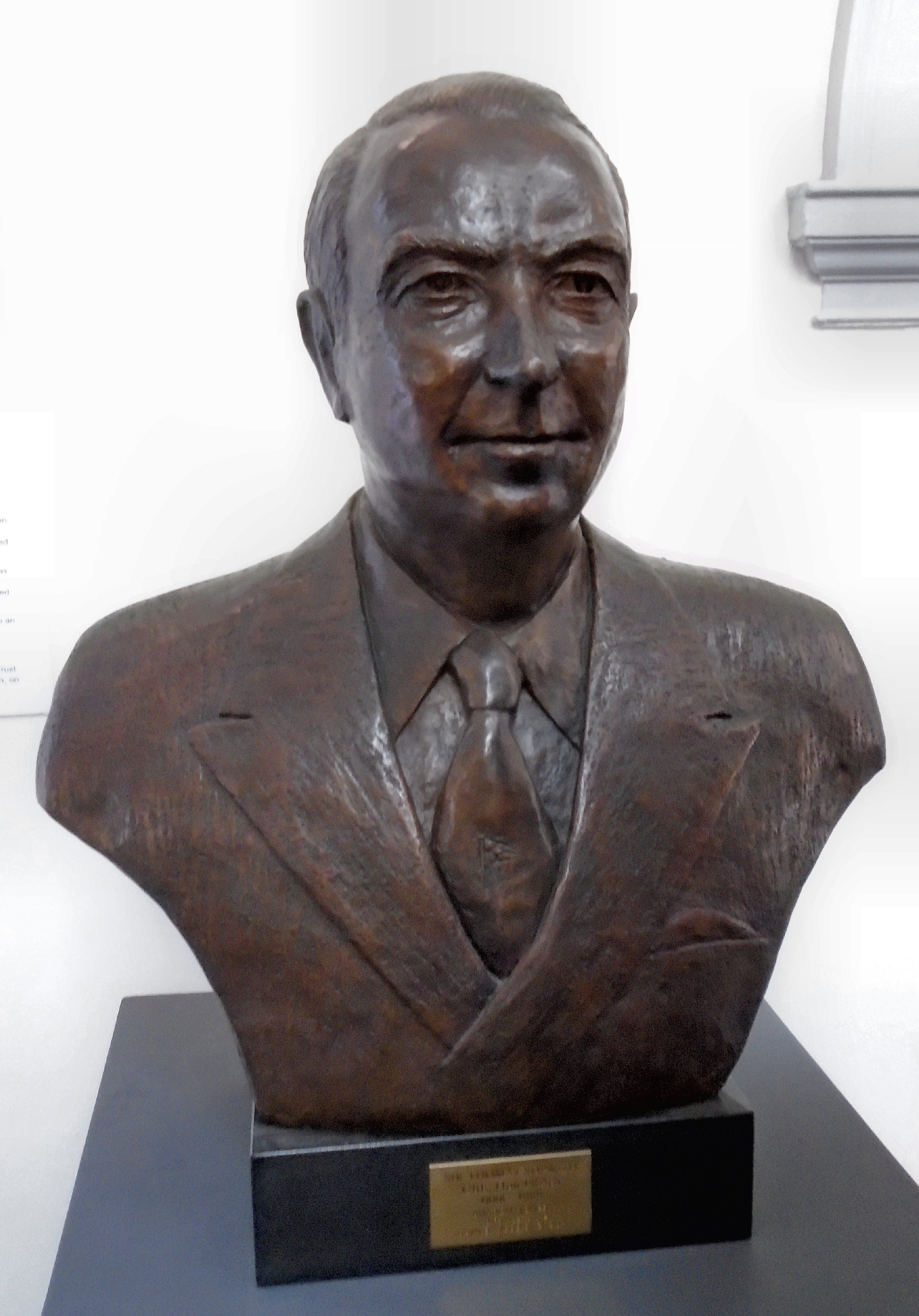
Bust of Sopwith at Kingston Library, London

His authorised biography is Pure Luck (2005) by Alan Bramson, with a foreword by the Prince of Wales (ISBN 1-85260-263-5). Sir Thomas was interviewed on 8 November 1978 by the art historian Anna Malinovska; the interview is reproduced in Voices in Flight, 2006.

A bronze bust of Sopwith was unveiled by his son at Kingston Library, London, on 26 September 2014. The sculptor was Ambrose Barber, a former executive of Hawker. Earlier in the same year, a plaque was unveiled at Canbury Gardens in Kingston upon Thames by Sopwith's son to commemorate the Sopwith aviation company.

Sopwith Way in Kingston upon Thames was named after Thomas Sopwith. Sopwith Road, one of the roads built on the site of the former Heston Aerodrome, is also named after him. Sopwith Road in Warfield (Bracknell, Berkshire), located close to his former home Warfield Hall and the location of the newly built Woodhurst school (part of Warfield CE Primary School), is also named after him.
