= Barbençon =

Barbençon Barbinçon (Walloon)
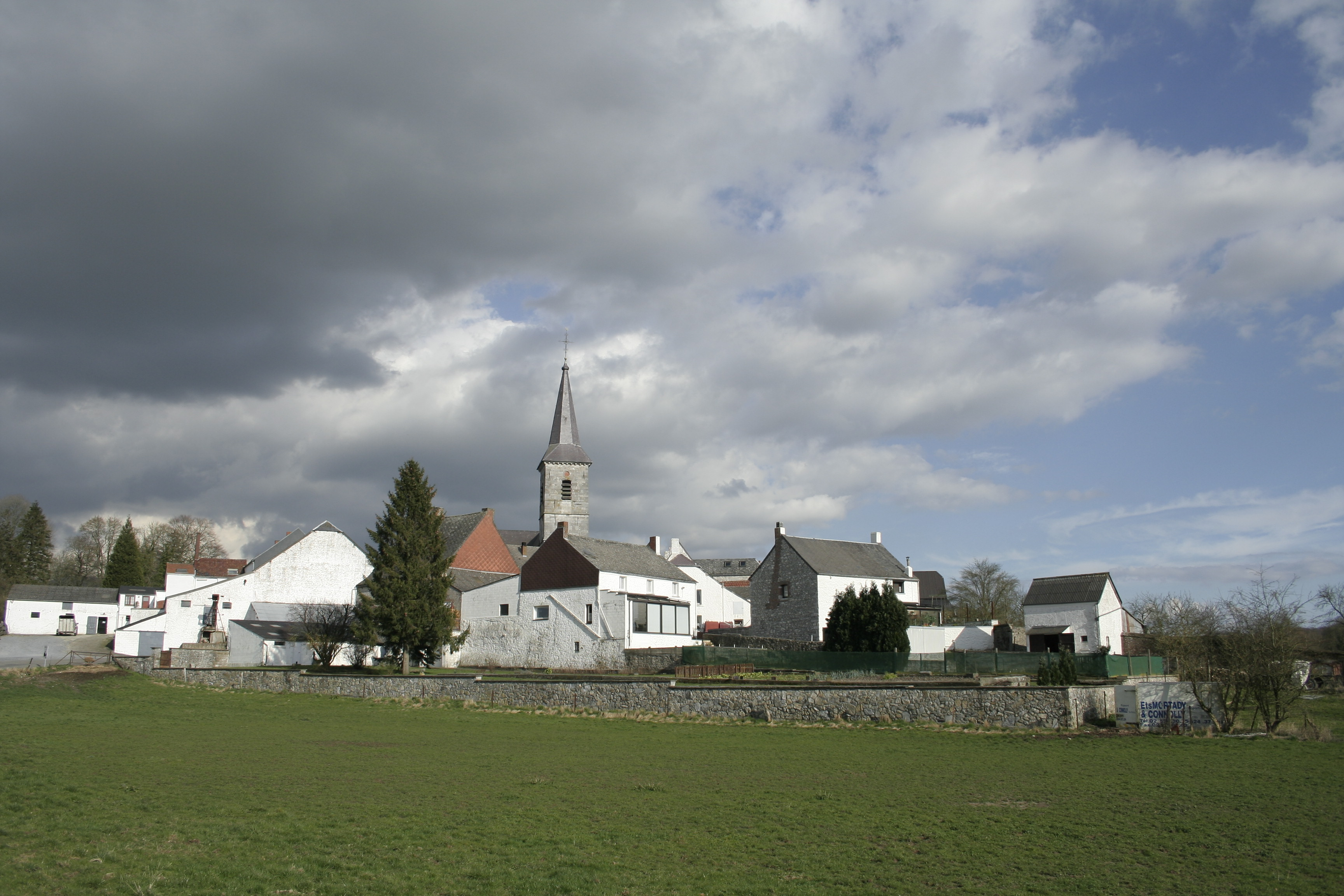
- Barbençon

- Coat of arms

- Location within Belgium Location within Europe
- Coordinates: 50°13′14″N 04°17′09″E
- Country: Belgium
- Region: Wallonia
- Province: Hainaut
- Municipality: Beaumont

Barbençon (Walloon: Barbinçon) is a village of Wallonia and a district of the municipality of Beaumont, located in the province of Hainaut, Belgium.

The village is a member of the association Les Plus Beaux Villages de Wallonie.

From c. 1400, glass was produced in the village. In 1559 a larger glass factory was established here, active until around 1750. From 1678 until 1815 the village belonged to France. The village church dates from the 12th century and has a richly sculpted portal. There are remnants of medieval ramparts and a château from the Napoleonic era in the village, and a preserved fortified farm from the 17th century.

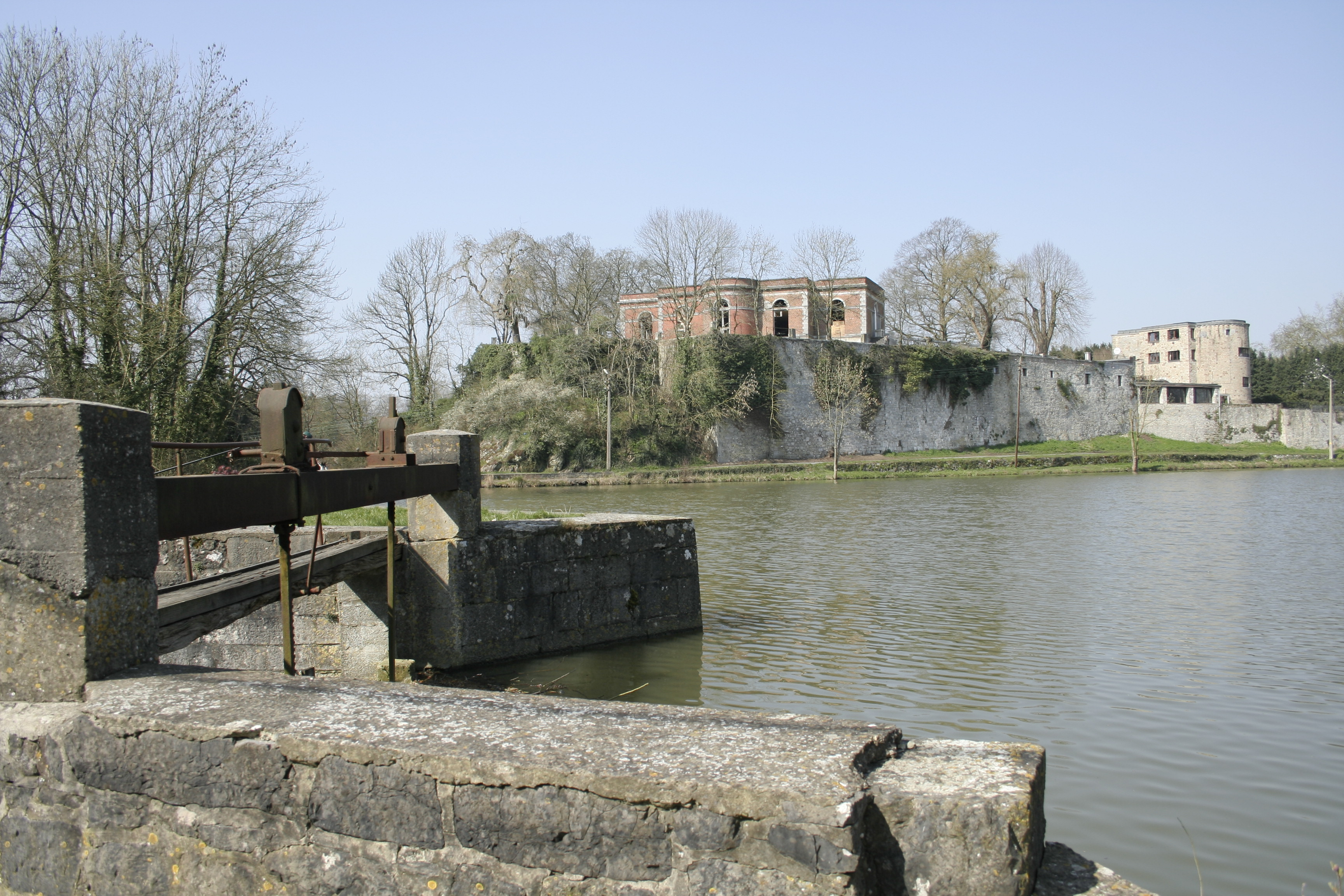
Castle ruins

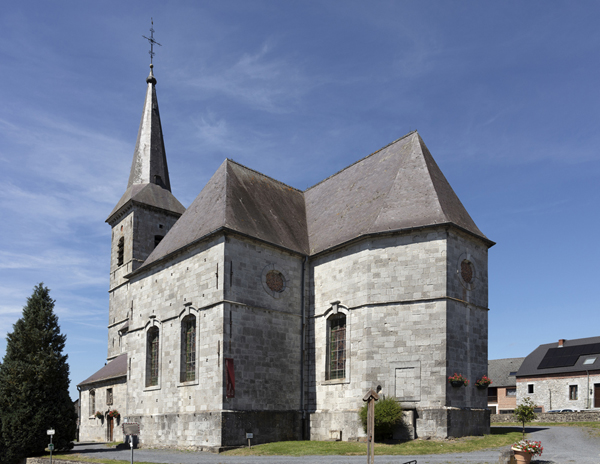
Saint Lambertus Church

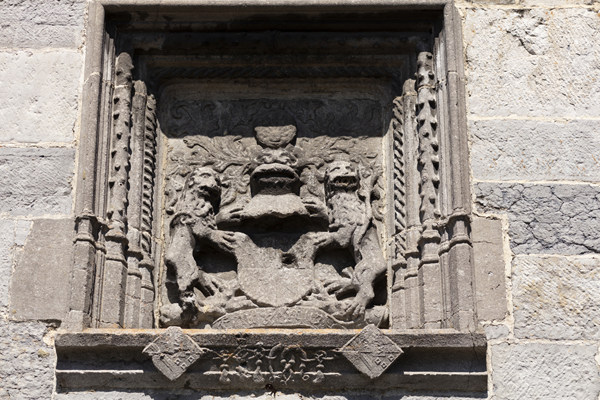
Saint Lambertus Church
