= Royal Aircraft Factory S.E.1 =

S.E.1
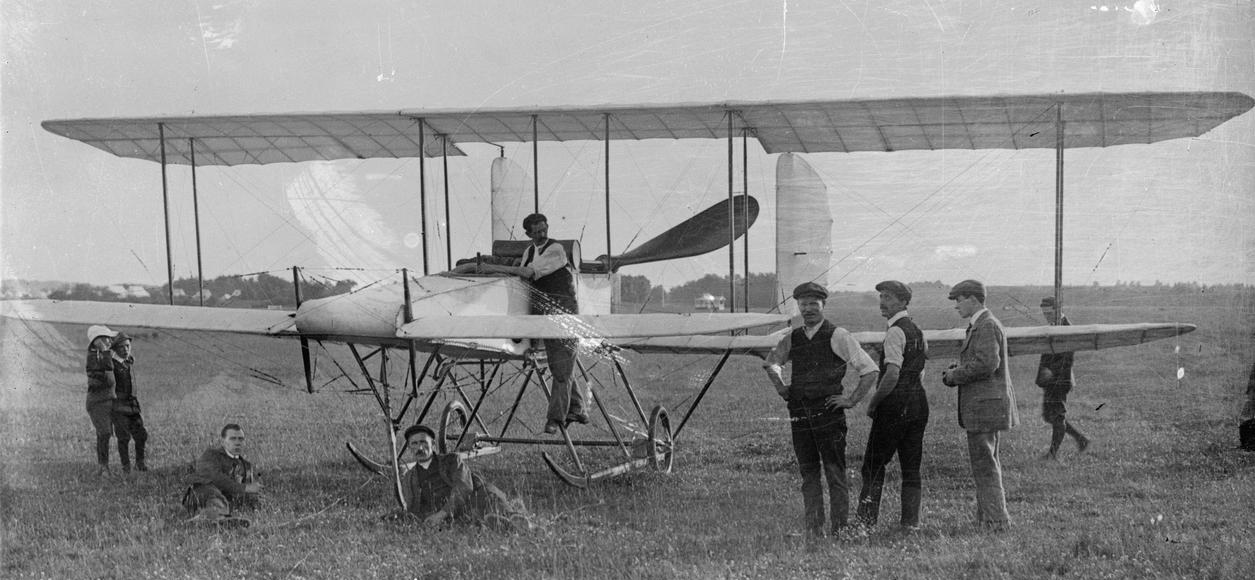

General information
- Type: Experimental research aircraft
- Manufacturer: Army Balloon Factory
- Designer: Geoffrey de Havilland, F. M. Green
- Number built: 1

History
- First flight: 11 June 1911

The Royal Aircraft Factory S.E.1 (S'antos Experimental) was an experimental aircraft built at the Army Balloon Factory at Farnborough (later the Royal Aircraft Factory) in 1911. Its place in aviation history is mainly that it was the first in the series of Royal Aircraft Factory designs - several of which played an important role in World War I.

== Design and Fate ==
In 1910, the Army Balloon Factory was not actually authorised to design or build aircraft, but only to repair them. When the remains of a crashed Blériot XII monoplane (nicknamed "The Man-Killer" owing to its poor handling) belonging to the army were sent from Larkhill to Farnborough for repair, authorisation for a complete reconstruction was sought, and granted. The result was a completely new design. A tractor monoplane became a pusher biplane with large balanced fore-elevators, similar in basic layout to the Wright Flyer, but with a fully covered fuselage. Ailerons were fitted to the top wing, and twin balanced rudders were mounted behind the propeller, but out of its immediate slipstream. The only obvious component of the Blériot that found its way into the new design was its 60 hp (45 kW) E.N.V. Type F engine.

The S.E.1 made its first flight, a straight mile in the hands of its designer Geoffrey de Havilland on 11 June 1911. Further flight testing revealed control problems and the area of the front wing/elevator was adjusted to try to bring together the centre of pressure and the hinge line and make the S.E.1 stable in pitch. By the beginning of August the front surface was fixed and carried a conventional trailing edge elevator. An attempt to improve the turning characteristics was made by stripping the side covering of the nacelle to reduce side area.

De Havilland continued to fly the S.E.1 until 16 August. On 18 August the aircraft was flown by the inexperienced pilot Lt. Theodore J. Ridge, assistant superintendent at the factory (whose previous experience was chiefly with dirigibles, and had only been awarded his pilot's certificate the day before, and was described as "an absolutely indifferent flyer"). Both de Havilland and a factory engineer warned him against flying it. The combination of the inexperienced pilot and the marginally controllable aircraft proved fatal – while landing, with the engine off, he made a sharp turn; the S.E.1 stalled and spun in, killing Ridge.

No attempt to rebuild the S.E.1 was made, and the design was apparently abandoned, no attempt being made to develop it. The S.E.2 of 1913 was a completely different kind of aeroplane – a development of the B.S.1.

== Specifications ==
Data from The Royal Aircraft Factory de Havilland Aircraft since 1909.

General characteristics

- Crew: 1
- Length: 29 ft 0 in (8.84 m)
- Wingspan: 38 ft 0 in (11.58 m)
- Height: 11 ft 6 in (3.51 m)
- Wing area: 400 sq ft (37 m^{2})
- Empty weight: 1,200 lb (544 kg)
- Gross weight: 1,640 lb (744 kg)
- Powerplant: 1 × E.N.V. Type F V-8 water-cooled piston engine, 60 hp (45 kW)
- Propellers: 2-bladed fixed-pitch pusher propeller

== Bibliography ==
- "The Fatal Accident at Aldershot". Flight. 26 August 1911. p. 741.
- Hare, Paul R (1990). The Royal Aircraft Factory. London: Putnam. ISBN 0-85177-843-7.
- Jackson, A.J. (1978). de Havilland Aircraft since 1909. London: Putnam Publishing. ISBN 0-370-30022-X.
- Jarrett, Philip (1991). "Farborough's First: The story of de Havilland's S.E.1". Air Enthusiast. No. Forty–two. pp. 1–10. ISSN 0143-5450.
- Jarrett, Philip (2002). "Making Flying Safer". In Jarrett, Philip (ed.). Pioneer Aircraft:Early Aviation before 1914. London: Putnam. pp. 202–215. ISBN 0-85177-869-0.
- Lewis, Peter British Aircraft 1809-1914 London, Putnam, 1962
- O'Gorman, Mervyn, "First Report on Aeroplane Research on Full-Sized Machines: Aeroplane S.E. 1", pp. 106–110 of Technical Report of the Advisory Committee for Aeronautics for the Year 1911–12, London: HMSO, 1919.
