= All Saints Church, Little Somborne =

Coordinates: 51.0919°N 1.4557°W

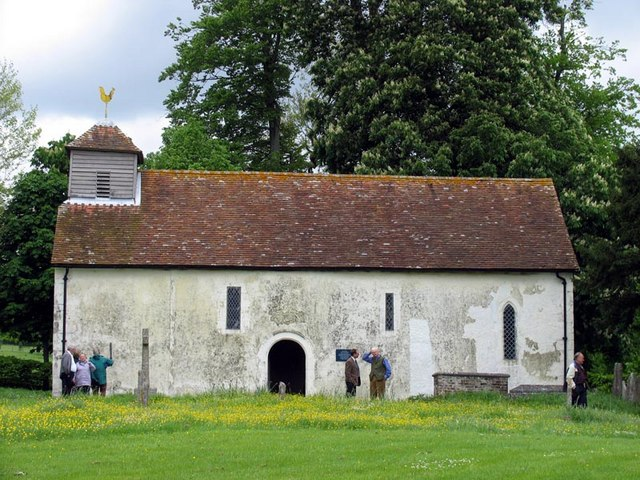
- All Saints' Church, Little Somborne, from the south

- Location in Hampshire
- OS grid reference: SU 383 326
- Location: Little Somborne, Hampshire
- Country: England
- Denomination: Church of England
- Website: Churches Conservation Trust

Architecture
- Functional status: Redundant
- Heritage designation: Grade II*
- Designated: 29 May 1957
- Architectural type: Church
- Style: Anglo-Saxon, Norman

Specifications
- Materials: Rendered flint rubble with stone dressings Tiled roof

All Saints' Church is a redundant Church of England parish church in the hamlet of Little Somborne, Hampshire, England. It is a Grade II* listed building in the National Heritage List for England and is under the care of the Churches Conservation Trust. The church is about 4 miles (6 km) southeast of Stockbridge, east of the A3057 road.

== History ==
The oldest parts of the church are Anglo-Saxon. The original church had a nave and a chancel, but in 1170 the chancel was removed, the nave was extended towards the east, and a very small chancel was added at the east end. The chancel was removed in the 17th century, the chancel arch was filled in with a wall and a window was inserted.

== Architecture ==
The church is built of flint rubble with stone dressings. The walls are rendered and colourwashed. The roof is tiled. Its plan is simple, consisting of a nave and a chancel in a single range, with a weatherboarded bellcote at the west end. At the east end, within the former chancel arch, is a three-light square-headed window, and above this are two lancet windows. In the north wall of the chancel is a 12th-century single-light window. West of this is a blocked door dating from the same period. Also in the north wall is an Anglo-Saxon pilaster strip made in Binstead stone from the Isle of Wight. In the south wall of the chancel is a 13th-century lancet window. West of this are two single-light square-headed windows. Between these is a Norman round-headed doorway. The west window is 14th-century and has two lights with trefoil heads, and there is a quatrefoil window above it.

The plaster has been stripped from the interior side of the walls, and the floor has been partly removed and replaced by flagstones. South of the chancel arch is a small round-headed niche. The font is 19th-century.

== Churchyard ==
In the churchyard is the grave of Thomas Sopwith (1888–1989), the pioneer aviator, aircraft manufacturer and yachtsman.

== See also ==
- List of churches preserved by the Churches Conservation Trust in South East England
