= Blériot XII =

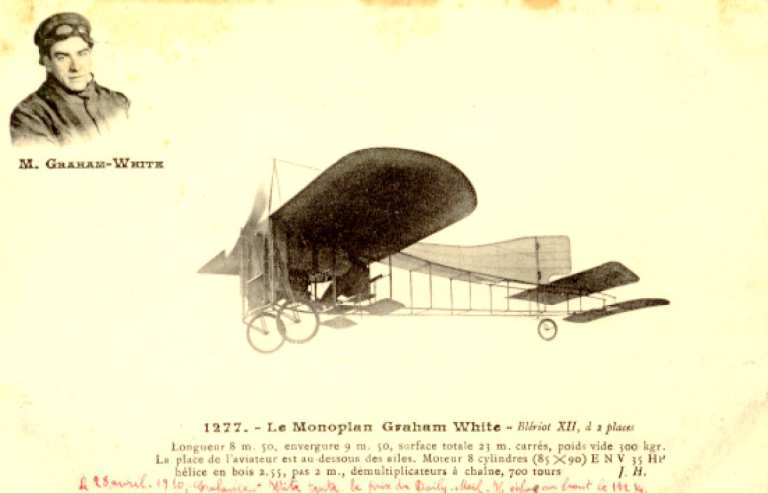

General information
- Manufacturer: Louis Blériot
- Designer: Louis Blériot
- Number built: at least 3

History
- First flight: 21 May 1909

The Blériot XII was an early French aeroplane built by Louis Blériot. It was first flown in May 1909 and was the first aircraft to be flown with two passengers on board, and was used by Blériot to gain second place in the 1909 Gordon Bennett Cup and to set a new world speed record.

== Development ==
The Blériot XII was a high wing tractor configuration monoplane with a deep uncovered fuselage, with the wings mounted on the upper longerons and the pilot and passenger seated between upper and lower longerons below the trailing edge of the wing. Lateral control was effected by a pair of ailerons mounted independently of the wings on the lower longerons behind the pilot. The prototype was initially powered by an 40 hp (30 kW) E.N.V. Type D water-cooled engine mounted on the lower longerons, driving a two-bladed propeller mounted at the same level as the wing via a chain with a reduction ratio of about 2:1. When first flown the empennage consisted of an elevator at the extreme rear of the fuselage, with a separate fixed horizontal surface mounted above and in front of it, and three small rectangular rudders above the elevator. After initial flight trials during May 1909 the rudders were removed. Various configurations were experimented with, the final arrangement being an elongated triangular fin with a rectangular unbalanced rudder hinged to the trailing edge.

== Operational history ==
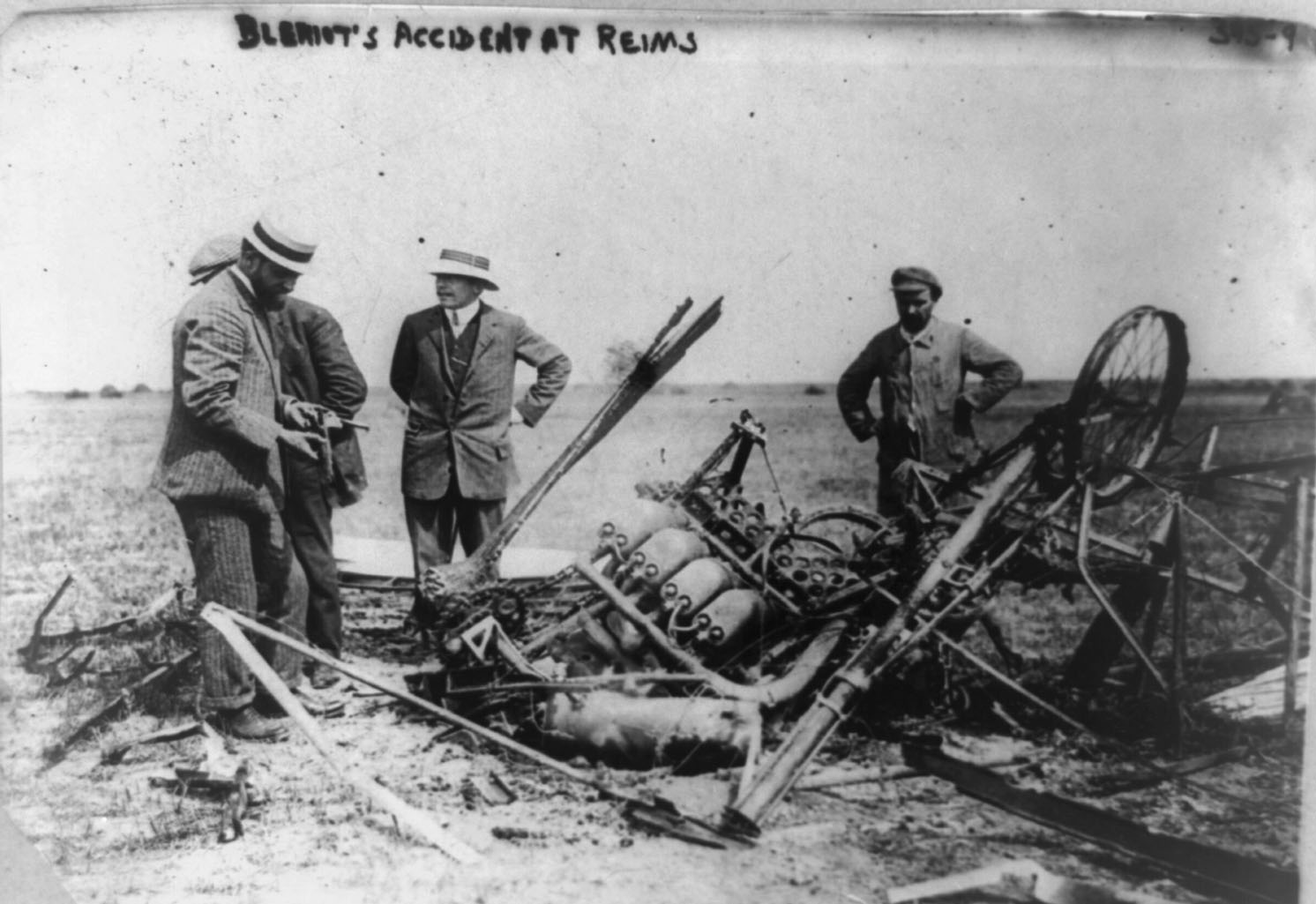
Remains of Type XII after crash at Reims

The aircraft was first flown by Blériot on 21 May. Over the following weeks he made a number of long flights, and on 12 June it became the first aircraft to fly with three people aboard. One of the passengers was Alberto Santos-Dumont. At the Grande Semaine d'Aviation held at Reims between August 22 and August 29 Blériot flew two Type XIIs, the prototype (now powered by a 60 hp (45 kW) E.N.V. Type F and another powered by a 40 hp (30 kW) Anzani. Flying the E.N.V. powered aircraft he came second in the Gordon Bennett Cup race on 28 August, being beaten by Glenn Curtiss by a margin of 6 seconds. Later that day he succeeded in winning the prize for the fastest lap of the 10 km (6.2 mi) circuit, with a time of 7 minutes 47.8 seconds. His speed of 77 kilometres per hour (48 mph) was a new world speed record for the distance. The next day Blériot was flying the aircraft at a low altitude when it stalled, crashed and burst into flames. Blériot managed to land the aircraft and get clear, rolling on the ground to put out his overalls, which had caught fire, but the aircraft was destroyed.

An example powered by a 60 horsepower (45 kW) E.N.V. Type F was bought in December 1909 by Claude Grahame-White, who named it the White Eagle. However, Grahame White found the aircraft unsatisfactory, and it was later sold to Colonel Joseph Laycock and the Duke of Westminster, who presented it to the British War Office, making it the first heavier-than-air craft possessed by the Balloon School. Lieutenant Reginald Cammell was sent to France to collect the aircraft. Cammell described the aircraft as dangerously unstable and having too steep a glide angle. At Larkhill it acquired the nickname "The Man-Killer", and was eventually rebuilt by the Royal Aircraft Factory, who transformed it into the S.E. 1.

== Specifications ==
Data from Opdycke 1999 p.55

General characteristics

- Crew: 1
- Capacity: 2
- Length: 9.5 m (31 ft 2 in)
- Wingspan: 10 m (32 ft 10 in)
- Wing area: 22 m^{2} (240 sq ft)
- Empty weight: 600 kg (1,323 lb)
- Powerplant: 1 × E.N.V. , 35 kW (47 hp)

Performance

- Maximum speed: 100 km/h (62 mph, 54 kn)
