= Little Somborne =

Village and parish in Hampshire, England

Coordinates: 51.091200°N 1.45529°W

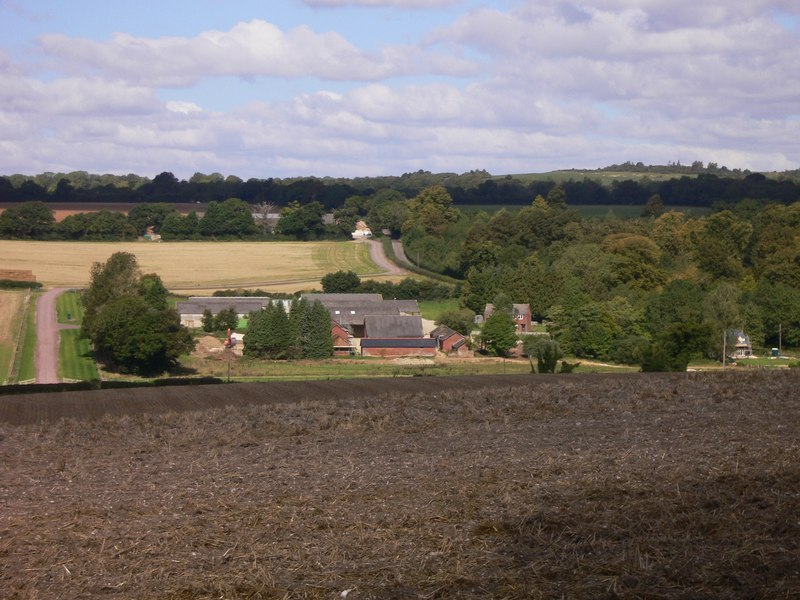
- View across the valley to the south

- Location within Hampshire
- OS grid reference: SU3824532573
- District: Test Valley
- Shire county: Hampshire
- Region: South East
- Country: England
- Sovereign state: United Kingdom
- Post town: STOCKBRIDGE
- Postcode district: SO20
- Dialling code: 01264
- Police: Hampshire and Isle of Wight
- Fire: Hampshire and Isle of Wight
- Ambulance: South Central
- UK Parliament: North West Hampshire

Little Somborne is a hamlet and civil parish of the Test Valley district in Hampshire, England. Its nearest town is Stockbridge, which lies approximately 2.3 miles (3.5 km) north-west from the hamlet.

== Geography of the civil parish ==
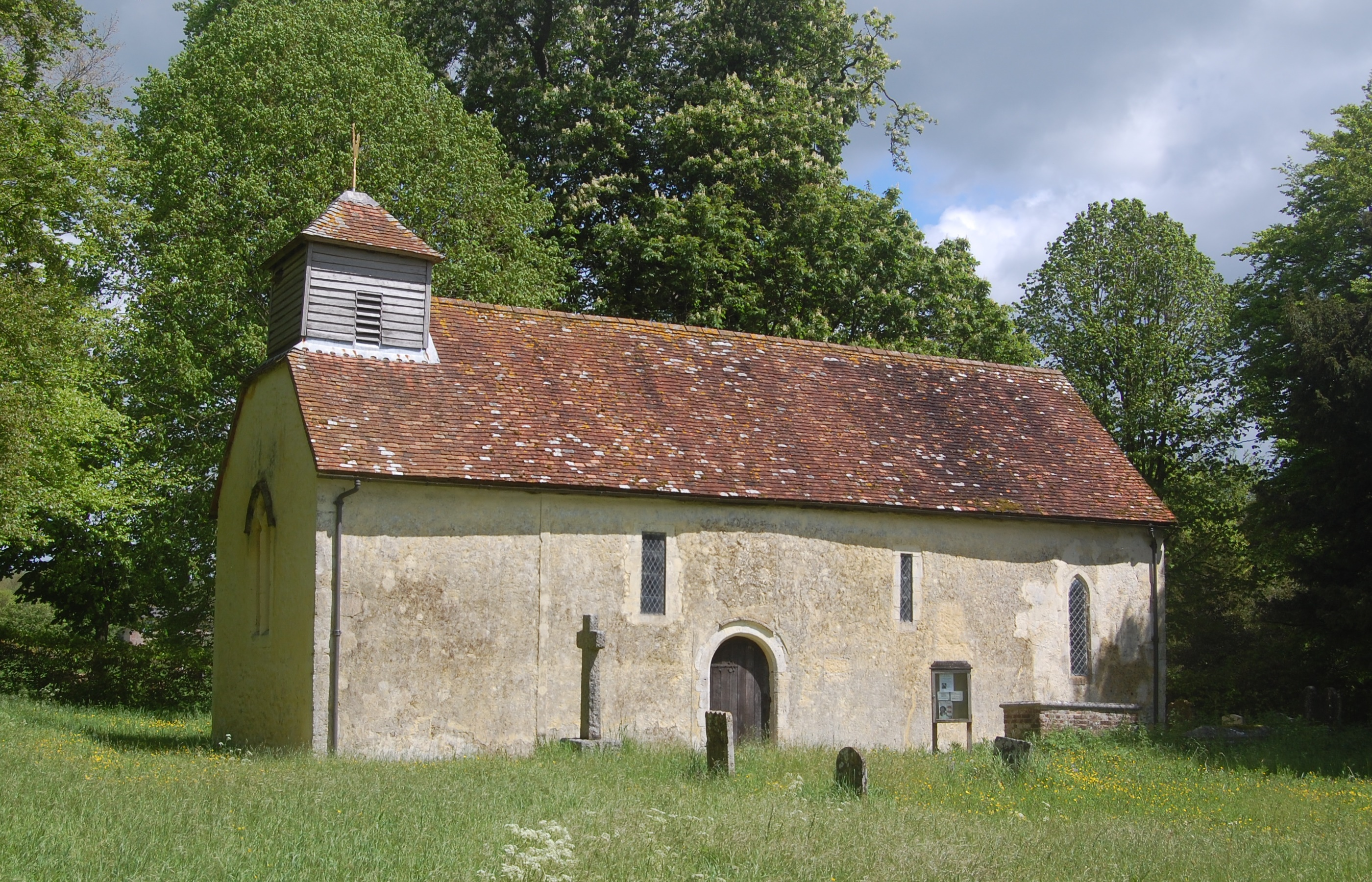
Former All Saints Church (2021)

The most northerly point of the civil parish is 175 m (190 yds) north of the Tumulus near New Farm, Leckford CP. A section of the A30 primary route passes through the north of the parish. It crosses the parish's eastern boundary 275 m (300 yds) before the previously mentioned Tumulus and exits the parish after another 0.87 km (0.54 mi) at the junction with Whitehall road. The B3049 Winchester to Stockbridge road crosses the eastern boundary of the parish on the Stockbridge side of Turnpike Copse, it leaves the parish 0.65 km (0.4 mi) later at the Winchester side of Ridge's Grove.

The parish is crossed north–south by a road generally less than 4 m wide called Whitehall Road. The northern end of WhiteHall Road begins at a junction off A30. It heads southeast for 1.3 km (0.8 mi) where it turns southwest and crosses the B3049 after 0.6 km (0.4 mi). From the junction with the B3048, Whitehall Road continues southwest for 2.2 km (1.4 mi) to a junction near Park Farm Cottages, Little Sombourne. The most southerly point of the parish is 160 m (175 yds) southeast of the entrance to Chalk Hill cottages along Chalk Hill lane, at this point the lane has a bend.

== See also ==
- All Saints Church, Little Somborne
