= Scottish Aeroplane Syndicate Avis =

General information
- Type: Pioneering sport aircraft
- National origin: United Kingdom
- Manufacturer: Howard T. Wright
- Designer: W.O. Manning
- Number built: 5

History
- First flight: March 1910

The Scottish Aeroplane Avis was a tractor monoplane built by Howard T. Wright in 1909. At that time Wright was one of England's foremost aircraft engineers, and had several monoplane aircraft under development. The Avis was shown at the 1910 Aero Exhibition in London and several examples were successfully flown during 1910.

== Design and development ==
The Avis was designed by Wright and William Oke Manning for Alan Boyle's newly formed Scottish Aeroplane Syndicate and was constructed at Wright's Battersea works during 1909. It was a single-seat tractor monoplane with an uncovered wire-braced wooden fuselage using wing-warping for lateral control, resembling the aircraft that Louis Bleriot had used to make the first flight across the English Channel. The wings were braced by wires attached to two pairs of cabane struts, which extended down and outwards to form two A-frames carrying a pair of skids to each of which a pair of wheels was attached using shock cords. It had an all-moving cruciform tail, built as a single assembly articulated on a universal joint. A small sprung tailwheel was fitted. At that time there was no standardised system for control layout and the Avis used foot pedals for lateral control, and a stick with a wheel at the top to control rudder and elevator.

The prototype, known as the Golden Plover, was fitted with a 30 hp (22 kW) Anzani engine. It was finished in December 1909, but trials at Brooklands were unsatisfactory and the engine was replaced by a 35 hp (26 kW) Anzani driving a wooden propeller manufactured by Wright. The prototype was first successfully flown by Boyle in March 1910. It was sold to Mr Maconie, who used it at Brooklands in August 1910.

== Operational history ==
A second aircraft, now called the Avis and sometimes called the Avis II because it was the second built, powered by a 40 hp (30 kW) J.A.P. was exhibited by the Scottist Aeronautical Syndicate at Olympia in Jan 1910. This aircraft was bought by R.F. Wickham, who flew it at Brooklands, extensively damaging it after a forced landing caused by engine failure.

The third built, which was powered by 40 hp (30 kW) E.N.V. engine was officially named the Avis I and was used as a personal machine by Boyle, who confusingly gave it his personal number "3", which was painted on the tail. He gained his Aero Club certificate (number 13) in it on 14 July, but wrecked the aircraft at the Bournemouth Air display later that month.

An example referred to as Avis III was bought by the racing driver John Herbert Spottiswode, who later sold it as a prop to the London photography studio Campbell–Gray .

Another, Avis IV, was used by Boyle to replace the aircraft wrecked at Bournemouth, but when the Scottish Aeronautical Syndicate was dissolved at the end of the year this was sold at auction at Brooklands, going for £50 to Eustace Gray, the Brooklands press steward.

== Specifications ==
Data from Lewis 1962, p.314

General characteristics

- Crew: 1
- Length: 27 ft (8.2 m)
- Wingspan: 28 ft (8.5 m)
- Wing area: 160 sq ft (15 m^{2})
- Empty weight: 430 lb (195 kg)
- Gross weight: 630 lb (286 kg)
- Powerplant: 1 × J.A.P. 8-cylinder, 40 hp (30 kW)
- Propellers: 2-bladed
