= Beaumont, Belgium =

City in Hainaut Province, Wallonia, Belgium

Beaumont Biômont (Walloon)
- Municipality
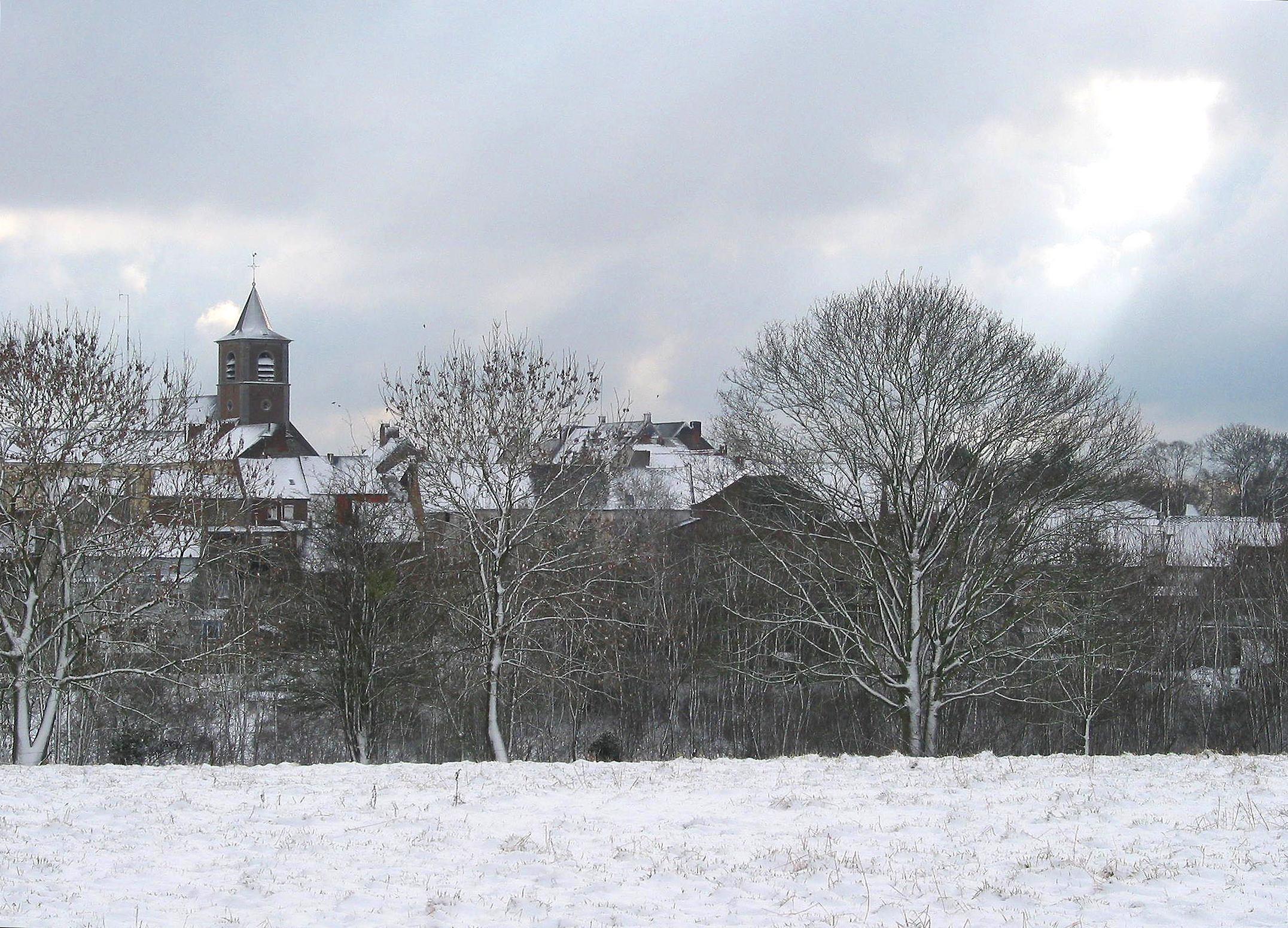

- Flag Coat of arms

- Location of Beaumont in Hainaut
- Interactive map of Beaumont
- Location in Belgium
- Coordinates: 50°14′N 04°14′E
- Country: Belgium
- Community: French Community
- Region: Wallonia
- Province: Hainaut
- Arrondissement: Thuin

Government
  - Mayor: Bruno Lambert (cdH) (ICI)
  - Governing party: Intérêts Communaux Indépendants (ICI)

Area
  - Total: 93.48 km^{2} (36.09 sq mi)

Population (2026-01-01)
  - Total: 7,104
  - Density: 75.99/km^{2} (196.8/sq mi)
- Postal codes: 6500, 6511
- NIS code: 56005
- Area codes: 071
- Website: www.beaumont.be

Beaumont (French pronunciation: [bomɔ̃]; Walloon: Biômont) is a city and municipality of Wallonia located in the Belgian province of Hainaut, on the border with France.

On 1 January 2012 Beaumont had a total population of 7,060. The total area is 92.97 km^{2}.

The municipality consists of the following districts: Barbençon, Beaumont, Leugnies, Leval-Chaudeville, Renlies, Solre-Saint-Géry, Strée, and Thirimont.

The Tour Salamandre, an 11th-century donjon, is the only remaining part of the Château de Beaumont, seat of the Croÿ family. It can still be visited and holds expositions of the town's history. The old castle, in which Napoleon spent a night before going to Waterloo in 1815, has been separated in two parts; one houses the town hall and the other contains a Catholic secondary school, Paridaens.

== Gallery ==
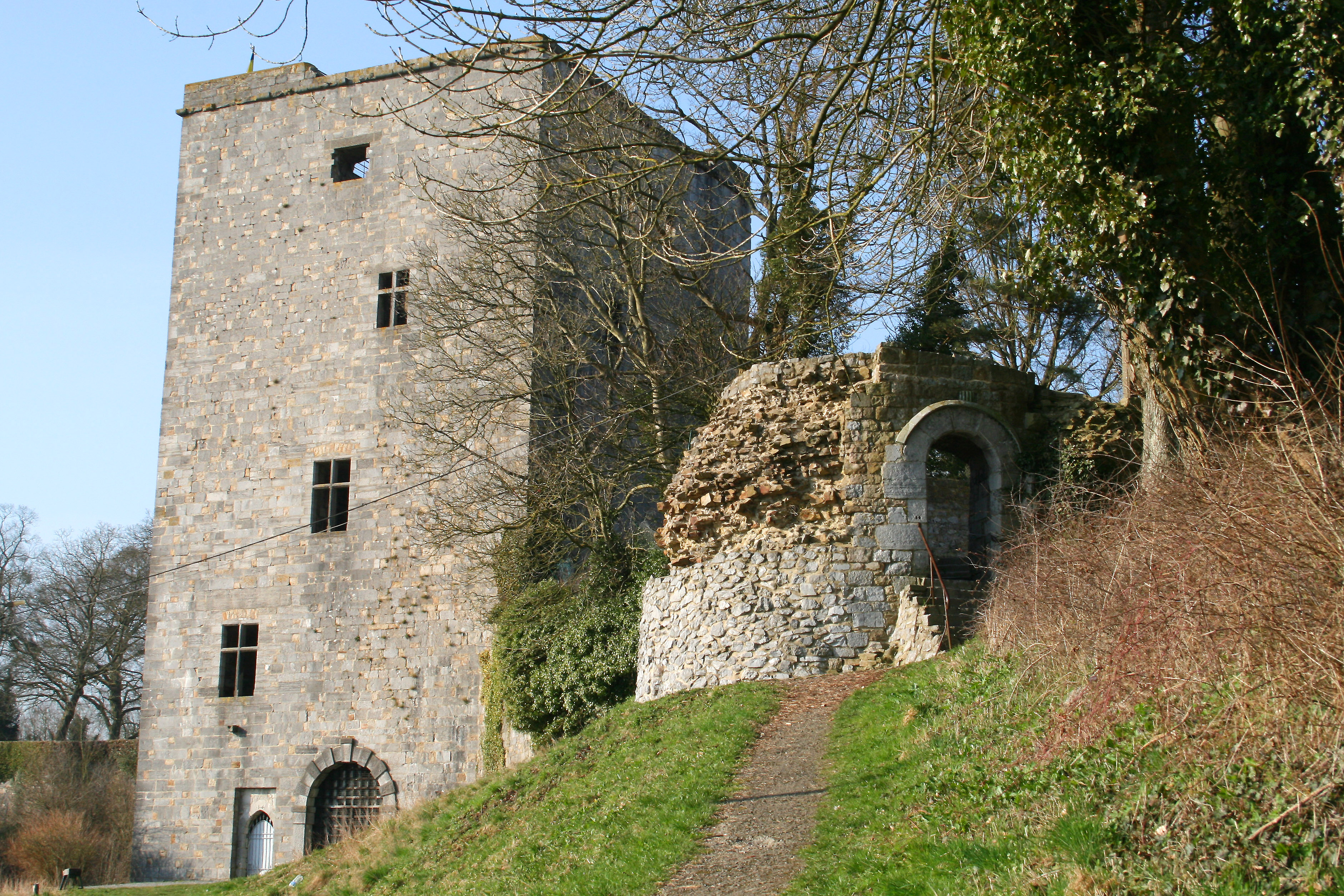
Tour Salamandre

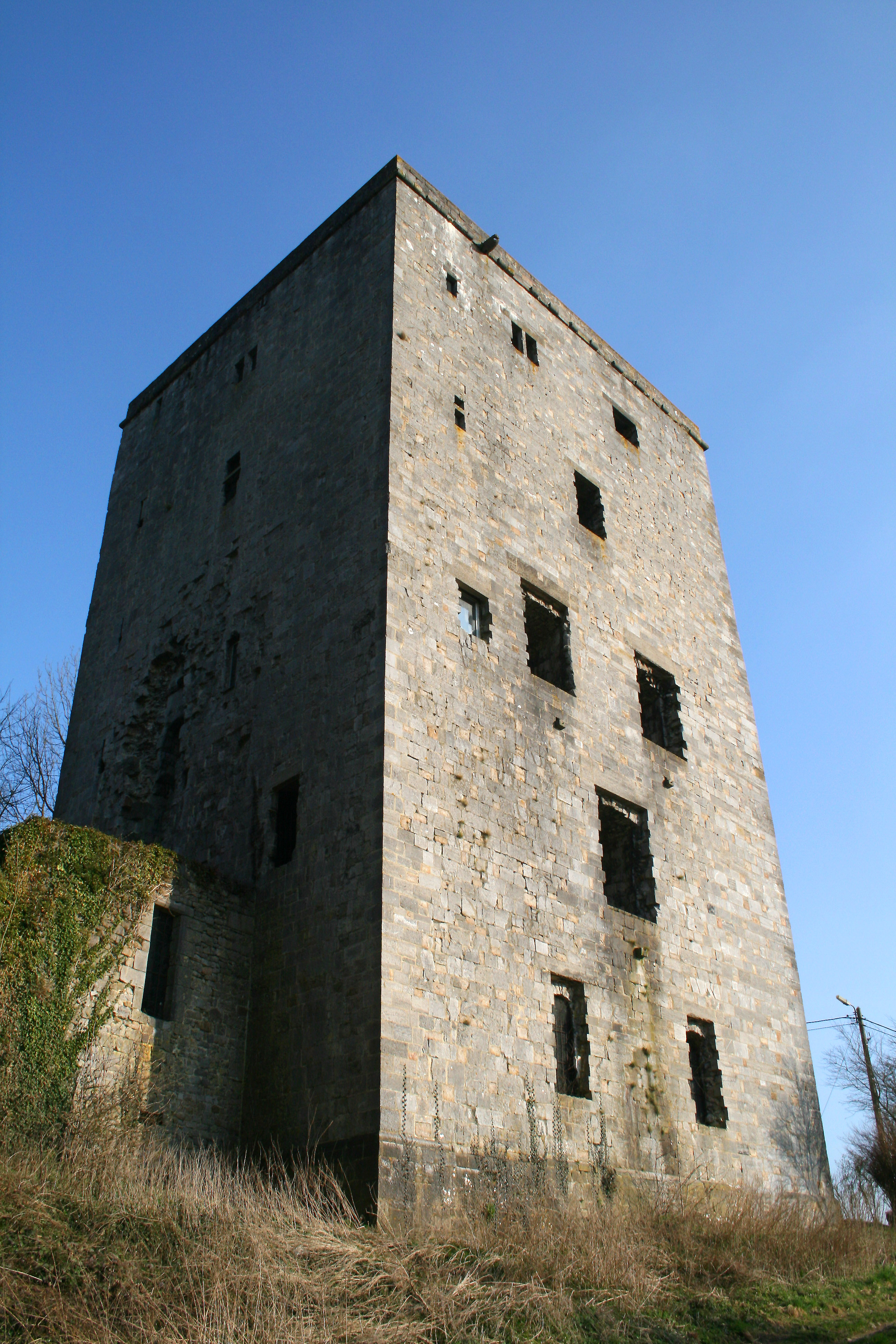
Tour Salamandre

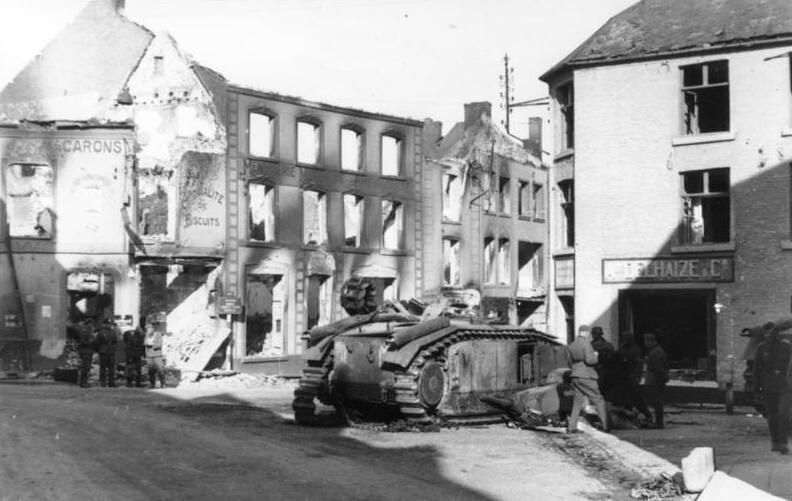
View of Beaumont after its capture by German troops during the German invasion of Belgium (1940)
