= Royal Automobile Club Volunteer Force =

The Royal Automobile Club Volunteer Force (also known as "RAC Corps of Volunteer Motor Drivers") was a group of civilian members of the Royal Automobile Club, who at the outbreak of the First World War in 1914, took their personal cars and joined the British Army in France and Belgium, to act as chauffeurs for senior officers. Following their involvement in the early battles of the war, several of their number were appointed to senior positions in the British military establishment.

== Formation ==
Shortly after departure of the British Expeditionary Force (BEF) for France on 7 August 1914, the War Office made a request to the Royal Automobile Club (RAC), that twenty-five suitable members, together with their own vehicles, make themselves available to the General Headquarters at the front. Volunteers were interviewed and their cars inspected by the RAC themselves under the direction of the club secretary, Julian Orde. Once accepted, the volunteers were told to obtain an officer's khaki Service Dress uniform (without badges) and whatever else they thought they might need, and to present themselves at Southampton Docks for embarkation on 21 August. The only equipment issued by the RAC was a brassard, described by one volunteer as "somewhat pretentious"; however, the War Office undertook to provide a daily allowance of 10 French Francs, as well as rations and petrol.

== Service ==
The volunteers and their cars arrived in Le Havre on 22 August aboard SS Gloucester Castle. They drove in convoy as far as Amiens where they met Major-General Frederick Robb, the Inspector-General of Lines of Communications. The volunteers were appointed to various corps and divisional headquarters of the BEF, while 6 of them were selected to go to the BEF's General Headquarters which were then located at Le Cateau.

The volunteers served with distinction during the Retreat from Mons, the First Battle of the Marne and the First Battle of Ypres, ferrying around staff officers and dispatches under the most dangerous conditions. In the early part of the campaign there was no defined front line; drivers at various times found themselves being chased by an uhlan cavalry patrol, shot at by a German sentry and detained at bayonet-point by French soldiers as suspected spies. A further group of forty-six volunteers were recruited by the RAC for service in the Siege of Antwerp, some of whom joined the ranks of the RNAS Armoured Car Section. Others were co-opted as staff officers or found other roles in the various divisional headquarters which they operated with. By the end of the war, 226 RAC members and 24 staff had served as volunteers, and between them had gone on to be awarded three Victoria Crosses and twelve Distinguished Service Orders.

== Notable Members ==
- Christopher D'Arcy Bloomfield Saltren Baker-Carr: a former infantry officer and small arms specialist. Went to France with a borrowed Mercedes car in August 1914, but by early 1915, he had established the Machine Gun School for the whole BEF and successfully lobbied Lord Kitchener to be allowed to create the Machine Gun Corps. He later wrote an account of his wartime exploits in From Chauffeur to Brigadier (1930).
- Frederic Coleman: a United States citizen, took his White car to France and later published an account of his wartime driving in From Mons to Ypres with French: a personal narrative.
- Hugh Grosvenor, 2nd Duke of Westminster: took his Rolls-Royce and chauffeur to France. Went on to serve with the RNAS Armoured Car Section and the Cheshire Yeomanry.
- Freddie Guest: a former Life Guards officer, Member of Parliament, polo player, pilot and racing driver, who took his Rolls-Royce car and became ADC to Sir John French.
- Harry Primrose, Lord Dalmeny: took his Rolls-Royce and became Camp Commandant and ADC to General Allenby.
- Alfred "Toby" Rawlinson: a former cavalry officer, Olympic polo player, pilot and racing driver. He took his Hudson sports car to France, but by October 1914 he had become a staff officer with the rank of Colonel. After being injured, he transferred to the Royal Naval Air Service and formed the Royal Naval Anti-Aircraft Mobile Brigade which defended London during the early Zeppelin raids. Transferring again to the Intelligence Corps, he oversaw the Armistice arrangements with Turkey, but was imprisoned for 20 months as a suspected spy.
- James Radley: a racing driver and pilot, who took his Rolls-Royce.
- James Armand de Rothschild: a racehorse owner who took his Rolls-Royce. As a French citizen, he was arrested in France and conscripted as a private in the French Army, but was quickly found a staff position with the British III Corps. He finished the war in Palestine as a major in the Jewish Legion.
- Mrs Nora Riddell is the only woman who appears to have served with the RAC volunteers. There is a medal card for her in the archive WO/372/23/35027 that gives her rank as "Owner/Driver" but no medals are recorded.
