= Gordon England (coachbuilder) =

British coachbuilding company

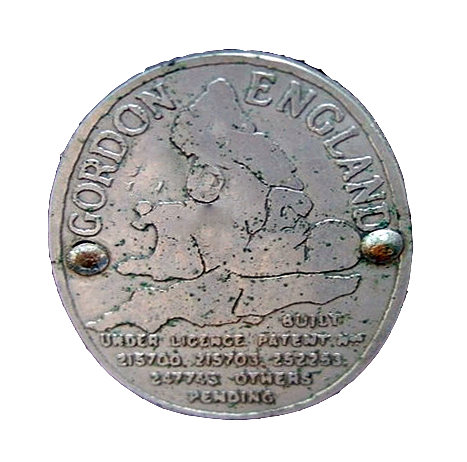
Gordon England

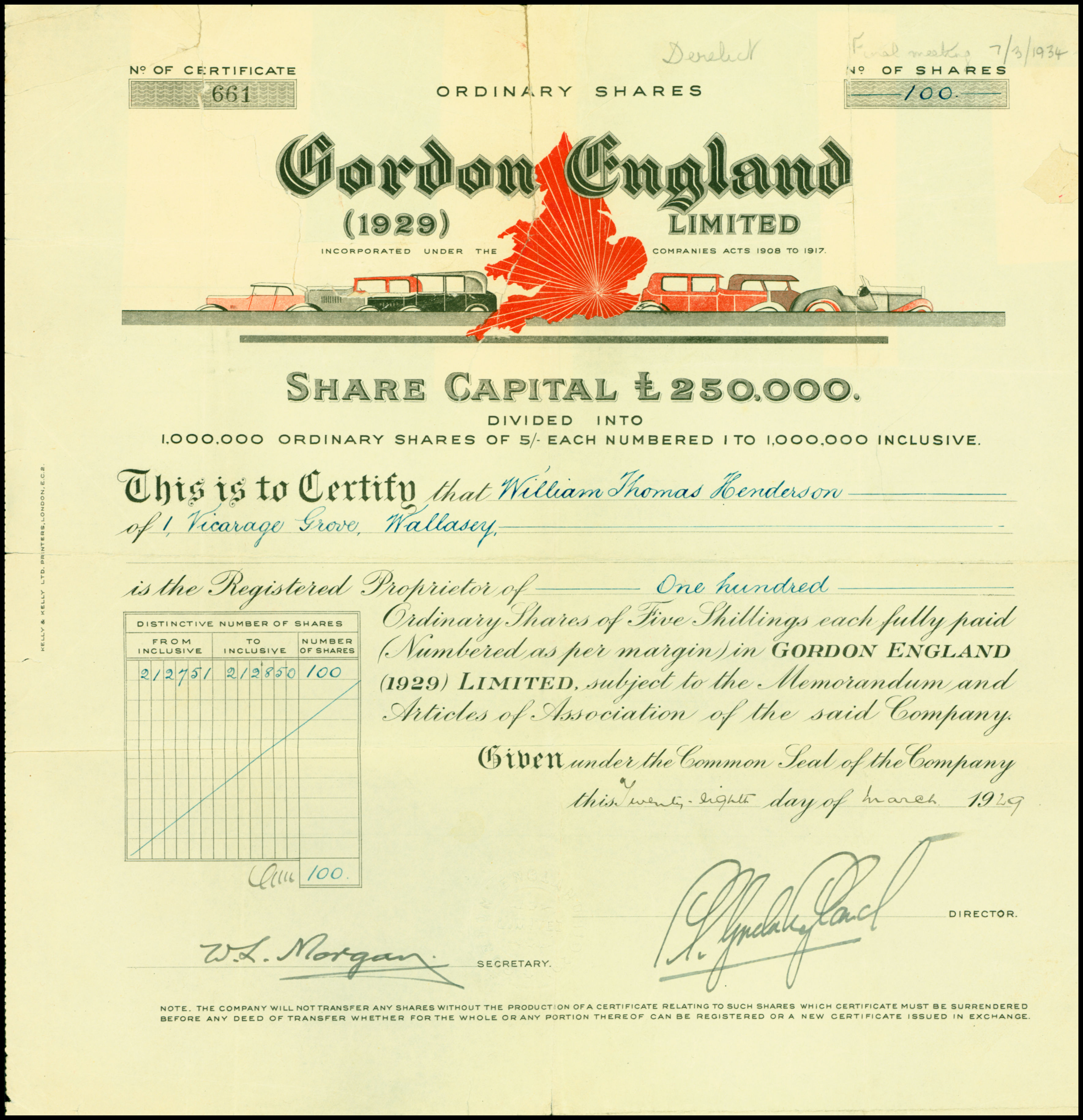
Share of the Gordon England (1929) Ltd., issued 28. March 1929

Gordon England was a British coachbuilding company based in Putney, South West London and later in the Palace of Industry, Wembley, North London with a showroom at 28 South Molton Street, Mayfair, London W1.

== Gordon England ==
E. C. Gordon England, after beginning an engineering apprenticeship with Great Northern Railway in Doncaster, changed to aviation and went on to pilot and design both gliders and powered aircraft and was works manager at Bristol Aeroplane Company during World War I. After that war he raced cars and also developed and patented lightweight car bodies.

== Lightweight bodies for cars ==
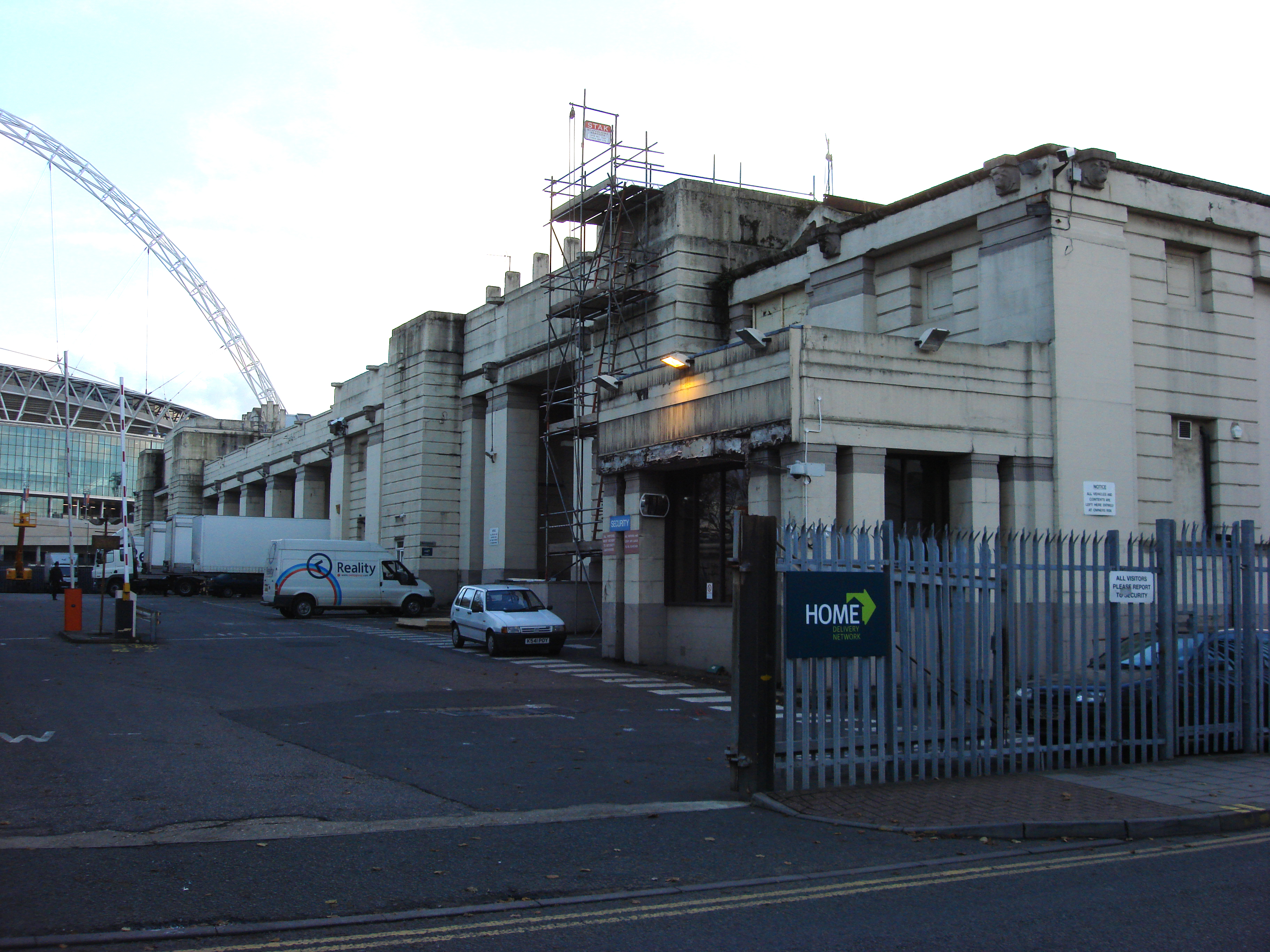
Palace of Industry, Wembley before demolition

After the war his interest turned to motor racing and in 1922 he obtained a chassis version of the new Austin 7 which he tuned and entered successfully at several events. This led him to make and sell a series of cars to the public based on his racers. He believed that car performance was being held back by the heavy coachwork being fitted to many models and set about designing bodies largely of plywood covered with fabric and fixed to the chassis with three rubber mountings. To make these George England (Motor Bodies) Ltd was incorporated in 1925.

=== Construction ===
Gordon England took four years to develop his own construction technique using a solid plywood shell without Weymann's skeletal frame. His seats and floorboards were mounted directly onto the chassis, as was the scuttle and instrument panel. The body was given a hollow box-girder of plywood around its base and attached to the frame at three points. This way the body on its three separate mounting points was able to maintain its shape even over rough roads.

=== Austin ===
The first model to be sold was the Brooklands Super-sports Austin 7 and although his racing version had been fabric covered the production version was aluminium panelled. Each one was supplied with a certificate stating that it would attain 80 mph (130 km/h). The "Cup" model followed in 1925 and then a fabric saloon which came out before the official factory version. In 1927 almost 20,000 bodies were supplied for the Austin 7.

Work extended beyond Austin and in 1925 a Rolls-Royce was fitted followed by work on Bentleys, MG, Morris, Standard and Wolseley. The Putney premises were outgrown and in 1927 the company moved to Wembley and exhibited at the London Olympia Motor Show with an Invicta on the stand.

The company was reformed as Gordon England (1929) Ltd and claimed to be making 35 bodies a day. However, the fabric body started to lose out to all-metal types, the company's fortunes declined and in 1930 it closed.

Gordon England coachwork on Austin Seven chassis

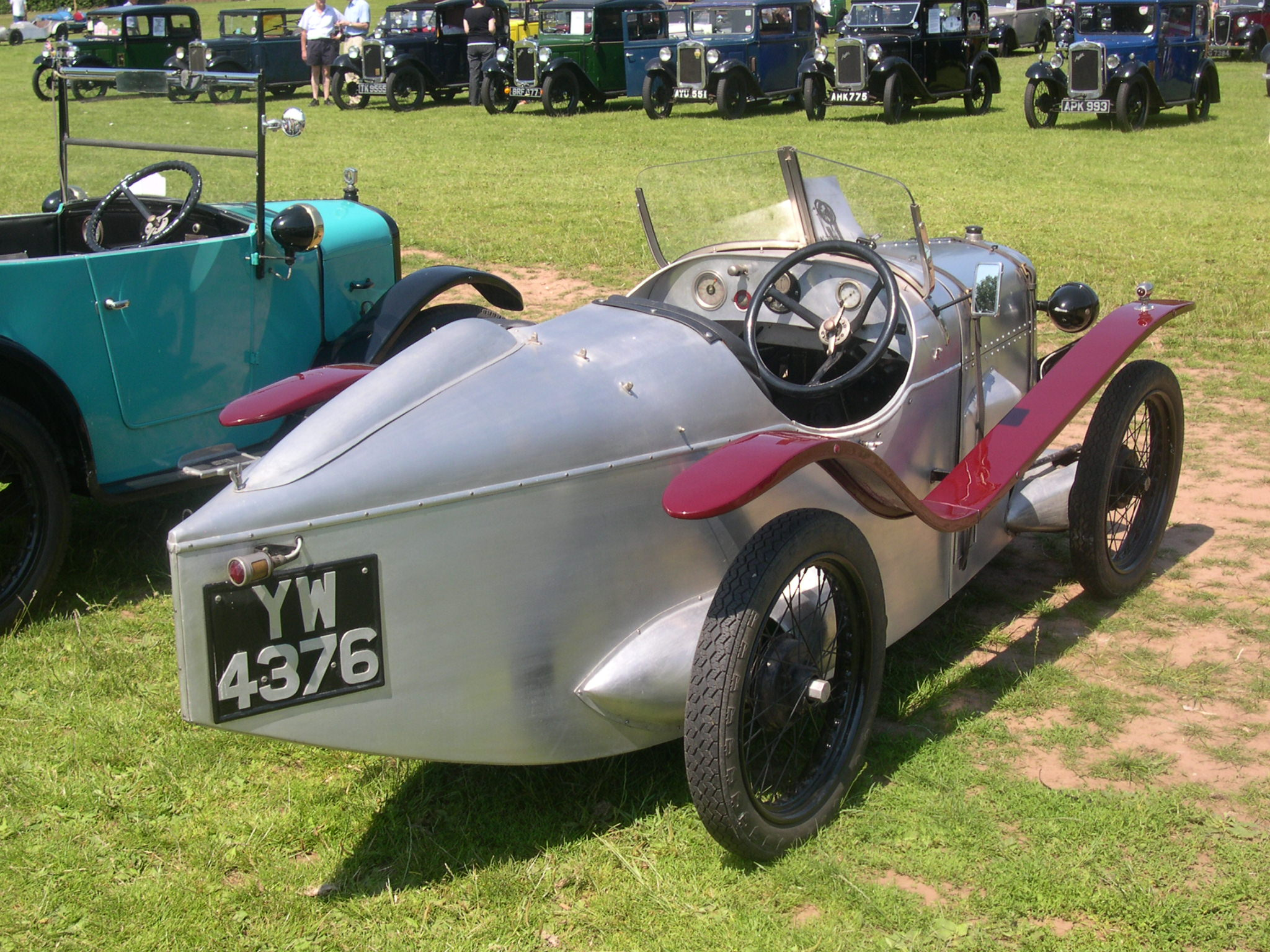
Brooklands Super-sports
1926

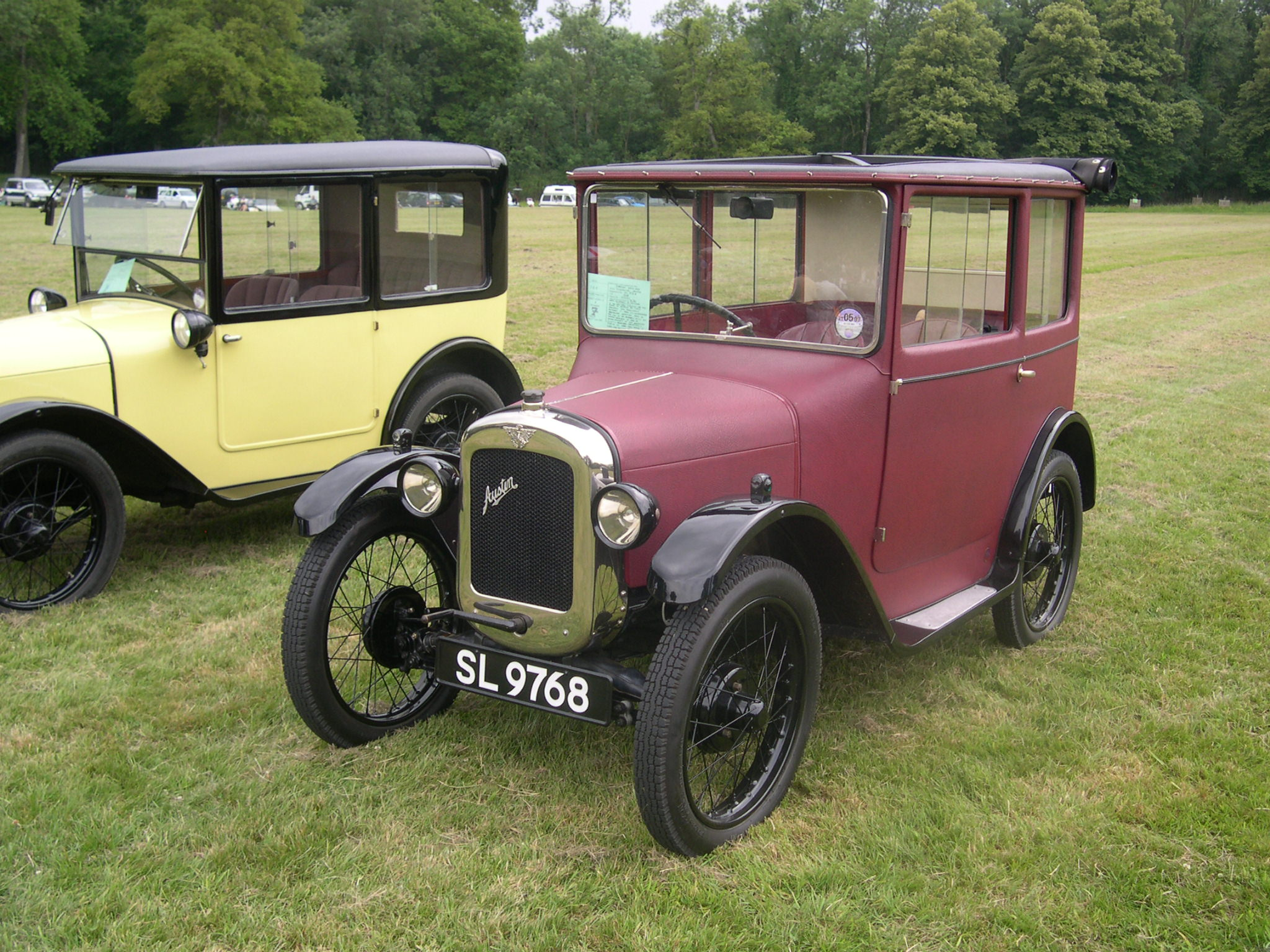
Sunshine saloon
1928

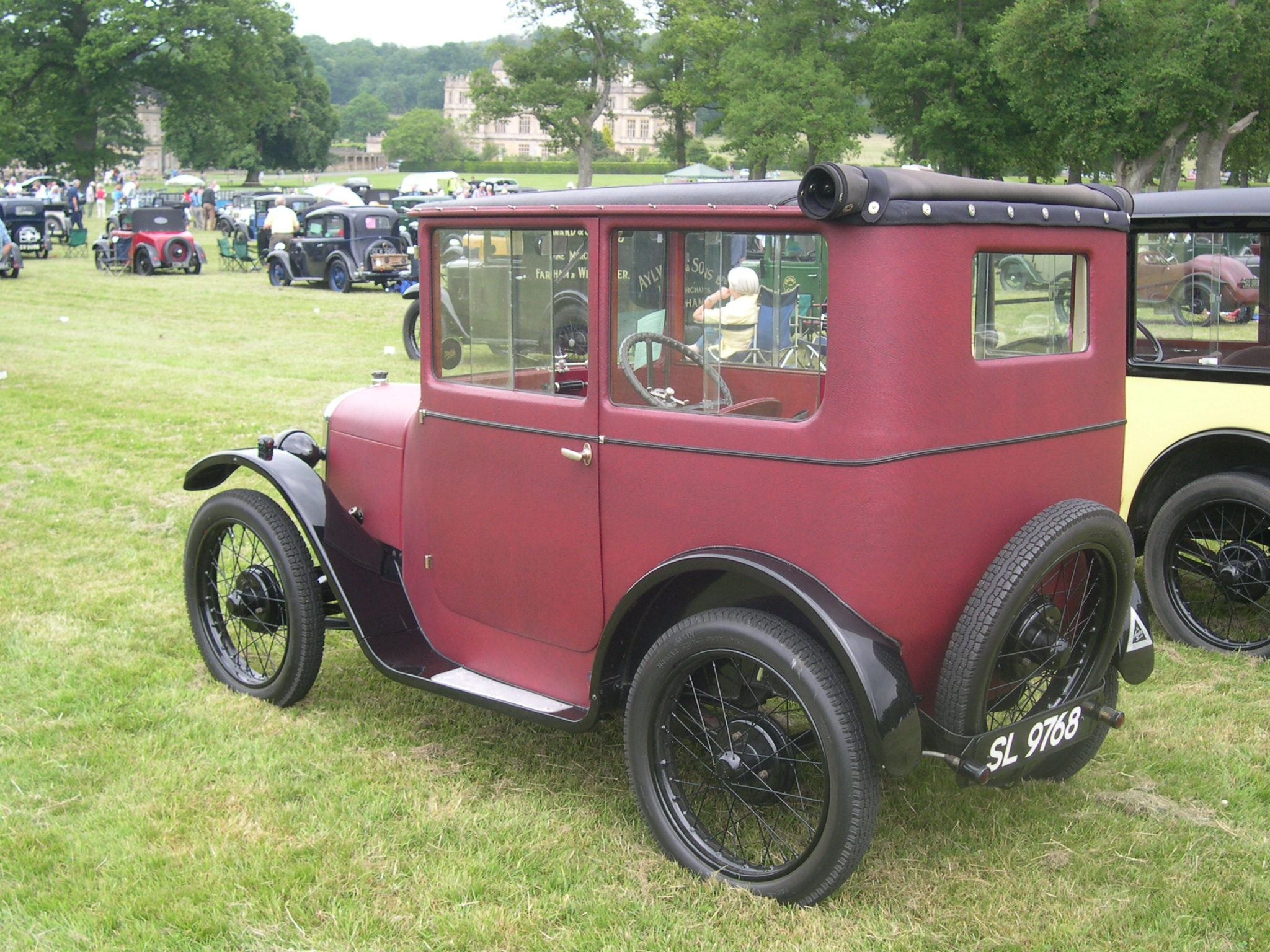
first Austin Seven saloon
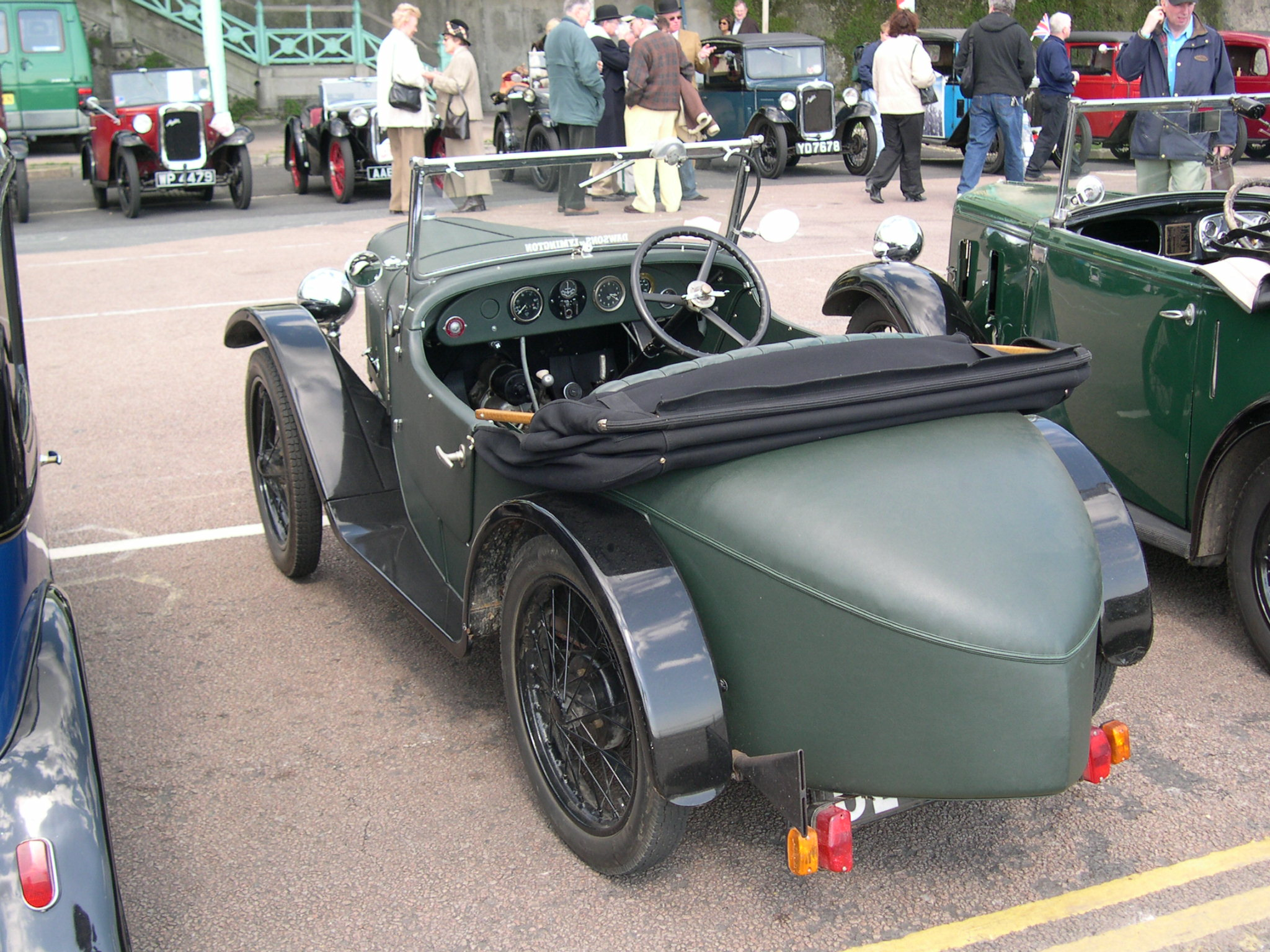
Stadium 2-seater
1929

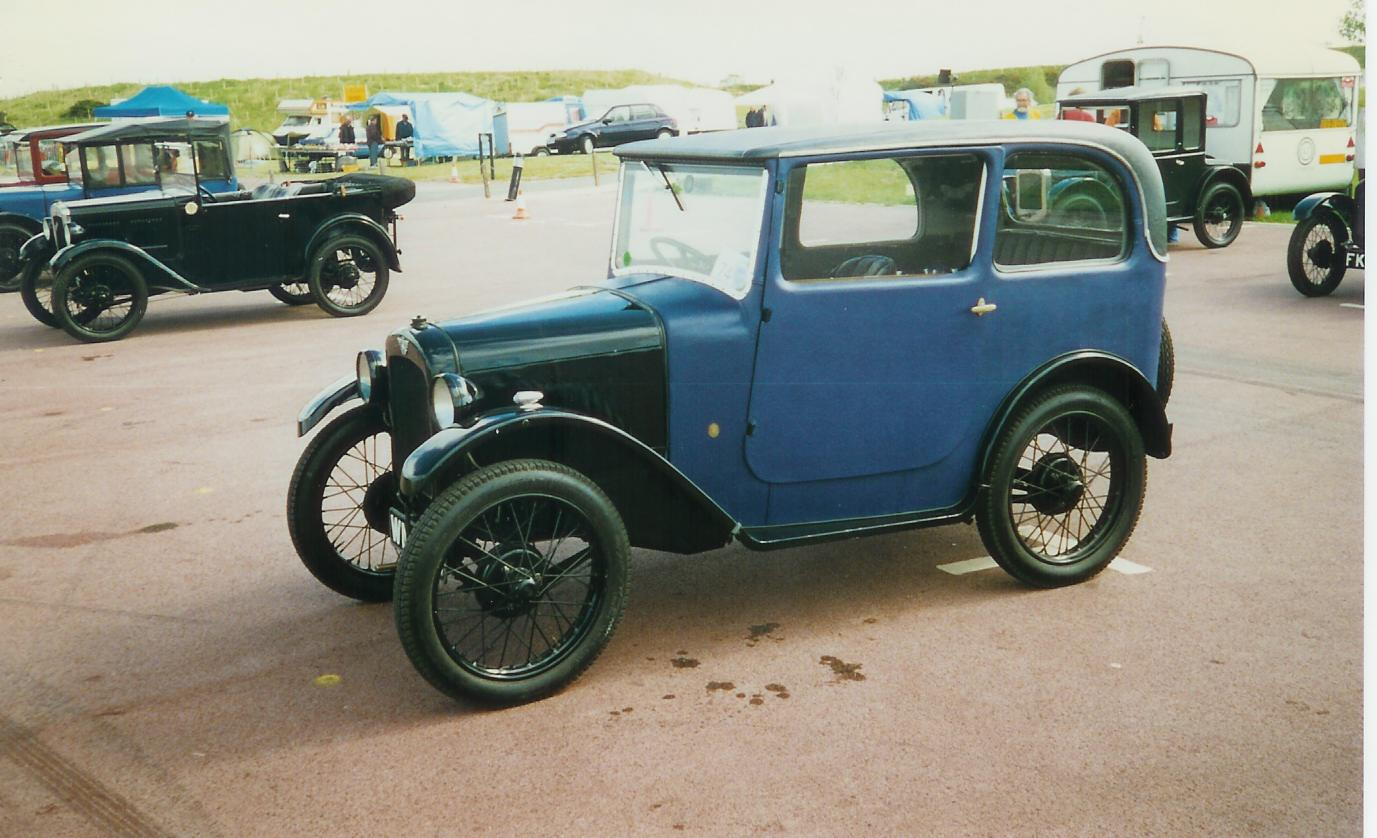
Wembley saloon
1929

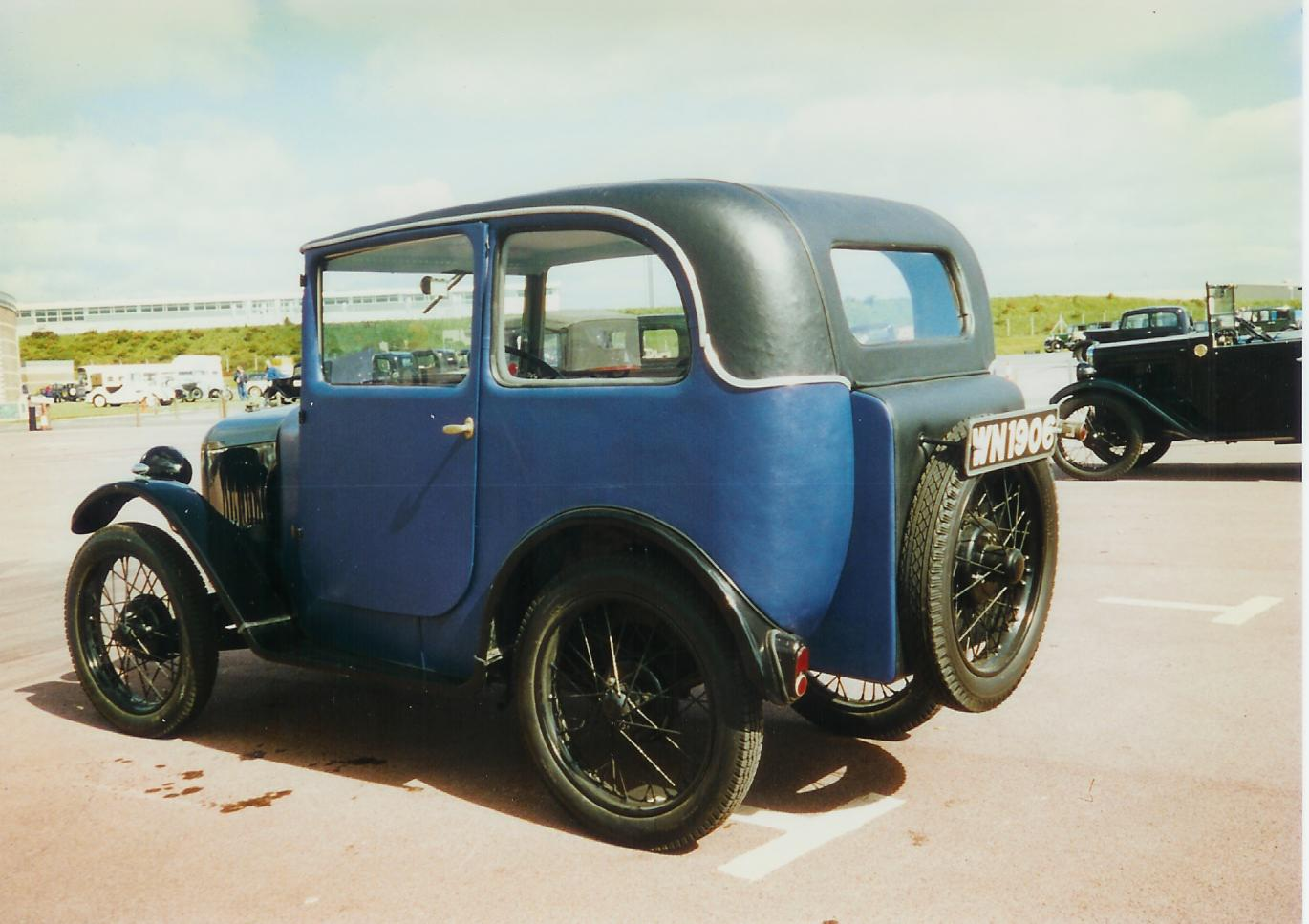

== First road test in history ==
The weekly magazine Autocar claims to have invented the road test. Its very first published test in 1928 was of an Austin 7 (Gordon) England Sunshine saloon, Sunshine because it had a very large sunroof.

== See also ==
- Eric Gordon England
- Gordon England glider
- Bristol Gordon England biplanes
