= James Radley =

English aviator (1884–1959)

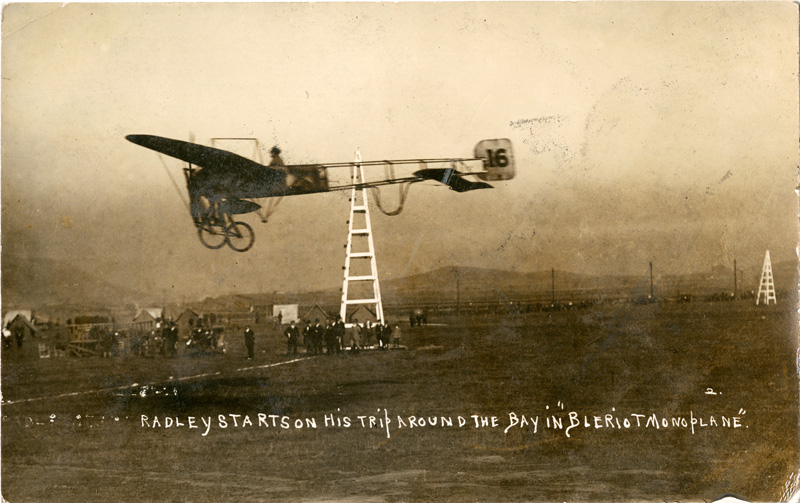
- Radley flying his Bleriot XI at Tanforan Park Racetrack in San Bruno, California (c. 1911), photographed by Charles Weidner
- Born: 9 February 1884; Dunnow Hall, Slaidburn, Yorkshire, England
- Died: 5 March 1959 (aged 75); Hampshire, England
- Known for: Auto racing Air racing Ballooning
- Aviation career
- Flight license: 14 June 1910

James Radley (1884–1959) was one of the first English aviators, holding Royal Aero Club Aviators Certificate Number 12. As well as carrying out demonstration flights and competitions in aircraft, he also piloted a ballon in a number of balloon races. As well as his interests in aviation he was a racing driver.

== Early life ==
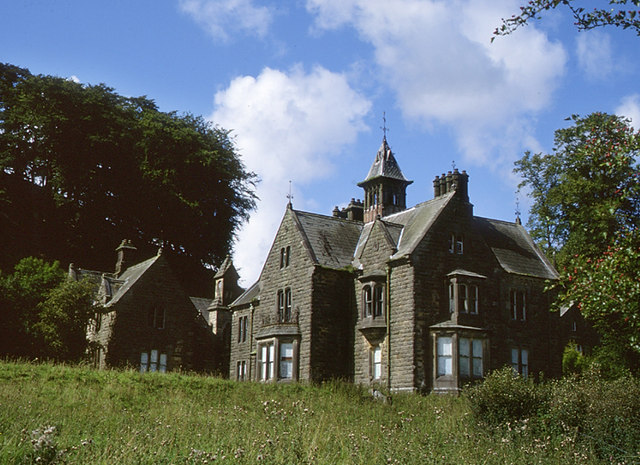
Dunnow Hall, home to the Radley family

Radley was born in 1884 at Dunnow Hall, Slaidburn in Yorkshire, England. His parents were James and Fanny Radley, his father being a wealthy colliery owner who took a 14-year lease of Dunnow, with shooting rights on part of the Slaidburn Estate, from William Wilkinson in 1877 for a rent of £400 per annum.

== Aviation and motor career ==
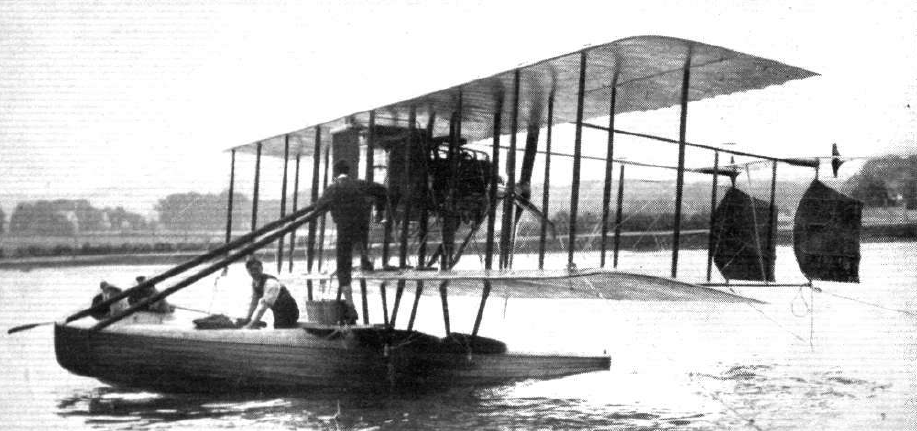
Radley-England seaplane in 1913

Radley started as a racing driver before gaining his aviators certificate on 14 June 1910.

In June 1910, he flew his Blériot XI at the first aviation meeting held in Scotland at Pollokshaws, Glasgow making seven flights.

In October 1910, he flew in the United States, winning the aviation race at Belmont Park in New York. Radley covered 20 miles in 19 minutes and 46 seconds, an American speed record.

In 1911 he entered the Daily Mail Circuit of Britain Air Race and was to use an Antoinette monoplane, but he failed to start.

In July 1912 he won a cross-country balloon race where he achieved a distance of 132 miles from Hurlingham.

For the 1913 Circuit of Britain race, Radley in co-operation with Gordon England designed and built the Radley-England waterplane to take place in the 1913 race. It was damaged before the race and did not complete, the aircraft was subsequently modified and re-built.

In 1912, Radley entered a Rolls-Royce Silver Ghost into the 1912 Austrian Alpine Trial, he also competed in 1913 and won in 1914 with test driver and riding mechanic 'Tubby' Ward.

In August 1914, Radley joined the Royal Automobile Club Volunteer Force and took his personal Rolls-Royce car to France to act as a civilian staff car driver for senior officers of the British Expeditionary Force.

== Later life ==
Radley died in 1959 at his home at Woodgreen, Hampshire.
