= Eric Gordon England =

British aviator, racing driver and engineer

Eric Cecil Gordon England
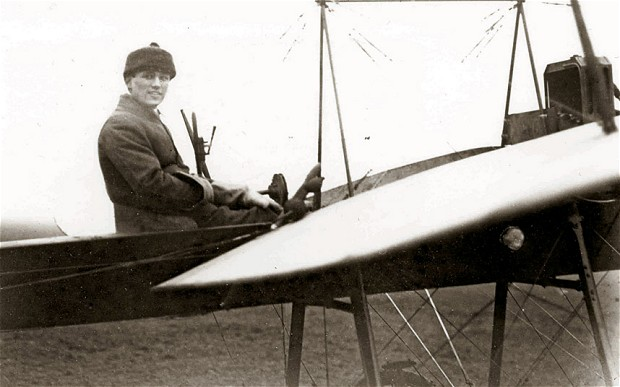
- Eric Cecil Gordon England in his Hanriot monoplane Henrietta
- Born: 5 April 1891; Concordia, Argentine Republic
- Died: February 1976 (aged 84); Bracknell, England
- Occupation(s): Aviator; Aeronautical engineer Racing driver Company director
- Known for: Birth of Gliding; Lightweight car bodies

Eric Cecil Gordon England (5 April 1891 – February 1976) AFRAeS, FIMT, was a British aviator, racing driver and engineer. E.C. Gordon England was one of the early pioneers of gliding, and his glider flight in 1909 is considered to be the birth of the sport of soaring.

== Early years ==
Gordon England was born in Argentina in 1891, the son of British parents George and Amy England. He emigrated to England at age ten, and he was first educated at New College, Eastbourne; then from 1904 to 1906 at Framlingham College in Suffolk. He then started an engineering apprenticeship with the Great Northern Railway works at Doncaster becoming a fellow-apprentice of W O Bentley.

== Early aviation and gliders ==
The glider Olive, in 1909

In 1908, he left the railways for his first job in aviation, working as an assistant for Noel Pemberton Billing who was trying to establish a flying ground at South Fambridge in Essex. While working for Pemberton Billing he met José Weiss, who designed and built tailless gliders, and England became an assistant to Weiss. On 27 June 1909, Gordon England flew a Weiss glider (named Olive after one of Weiss's five daughters), at Amberley Mount, Sussex, on a height-gaining flight that reached 100 feet. It is the first recorded soaring flight, and is considered to be the birth of the sport of Gliding.

== Aviator, designer and engineer ==
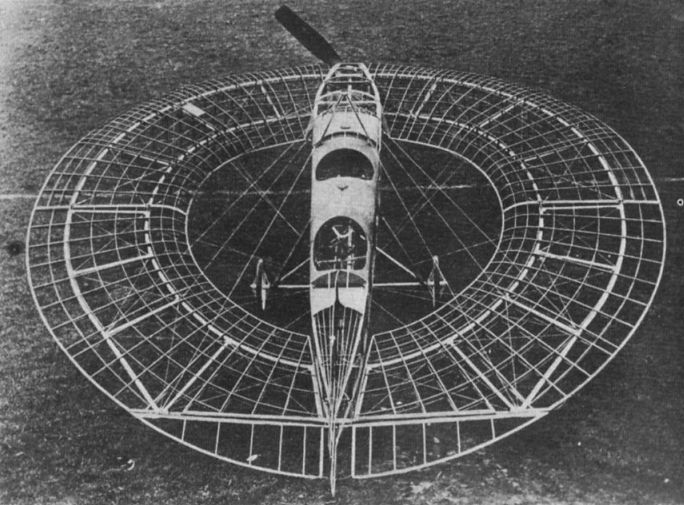
Lee-Richards Annular Monoplane No. I before its only flight 23 November 1913

In 1911, Gordon England taught himself to fly at the Bristol flying school at Brooklands, and he gained Pilot Certificate No. 68 in three hours. Later in 1911, he joined the Bristol Aeroplane Company as a staff pilot, but was soon recognised as a designer. One of his first design tasks was to convert a Bristol T-type biplane into a tractor design, which was then named the Bristol Challenger-England. This conversion was followed by three biplanes (the G.E.1, G.E.2 and G.E.3), all designed by Gordon England. In August 1912, the G.E.2 was flown by Gordon England in the Military Aeroplane Trials at Larkhill. Gordon England left the Bristol company, and in 1912 in association with James Radley produced the Radley-England waterplane; it was the first three-engined aircraft built in the United Kingdom. Between 1913 and 1916, he was a test pilot and consultant engineer to a number of aircraft constructors, mainly on the English south coast, including J. Samuel White and Company and White and Thompson. He also test flew the Lee-Richards annular monoplane.

In 1916, he became the factory manager for Frederick Sage & Company, which was building Short-designed seaplanes and Avro 504Ks under licence.

== Motor racing, car building and later life ==
In 1919, Gordon England left Frederick Sage & Co to become a consultant, and started an interest in motor racing. In 1922, with his father George, he became interested in building bodies for the Austin Seven sports cars. Using his skills gained with aircraft, he designed and patented a new lightweight body made from plywood box-girders and an ash framework covered with thin plywood panels. In 1925, he entered the 24 Hours of Le Mans race using one of his own designs, but he failed to finish. By 1927, over 20,000 Austin Sevens had been built with England bodies. He incorporated the company as Gordon England (1929) Ltd, but with the increase in the use of metal bodies, the firm eventually closed in 1930.

England became manager of the automotive lubricants department at the Vacuum Oil Company 1930–1935. He was managing director of General Aircraft Limited 1935–1942, and chairman of the Engineering Industries Association 1940–1944. General Manager, Eugene Ltd, 1945–1950. Life Member Council British Automobile Racing Club; Founder Member of Railway Conversion League; Member, Economic Research Council. FIMI, FRAeS, MIProdE.

In 1945, Gordon England contested the Bury St Edmunds seat in the General Election, standing for the socialist Common Wealth Party, but failed to get elected. England died in February 1976.

== See also ==
- Bristol Gordon England biplanes
- Gordon England (coachbuilder)
- Gordon England glider
