= Radley-England waterplanes =

Radley-England Waterplane
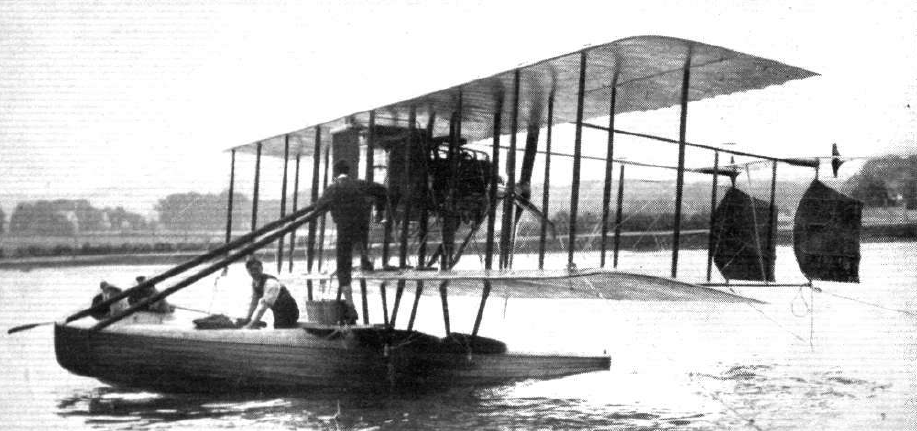
- Radley-England II

General information
- Type: Racing aircraft
- Designer: James Radley and Gordon England
- Number built: 1

History
- First flight: 1913

The Radley-England Waterplane was a British floatplane designed and built by James Radley and Gordon England to take place in the 1913 Circuit of Britain race. Damaged before the start of the race, it was unable to compete and was subsequently rebuilt as the Radley-England Waterplane 2

== Design and development ==
The Radley-England Waterplane was a twin-hulled flying boat with a parasol-mounted biplane wing. The wing was of four-bay biplane construction with ailerons fitted to the top wing only. A single horizontal stabiliser and elevator with twin balanced rudders mounted below it were carried on four wire-braced booms behind the wing. It was powered by three 50 hp (37 kW) Gnome Omega rotary engines arranged in line above the wing centre section, each connected by a roller chain to a long shaft at the rear of which was a four-bladed propeller 9 ft 10 in (3 m) diameter. To protect the occupants from the oil thrown out, the front engine was partially enclosed by an aluminium cowling.

A number of successful flights were made at Huntingdon in April 1913 with Gordon England at the controls, using a temporary wheeled undercarriage. It was then taken to Shoreham for further trials. During these England ran over a buoy when landing, tearing the bottom out of one of the hulls.

The aircraft was subsequently rebuilt in a modified form. The flat bottomed hulls were replaced with a pair of clinker-built hulls made by the South Coast Yacht Agency of Shoreham, each with a pair of tandem cockpits; the Gnome engines were replaced by a single 150 hp (110 kW) Sunbeam 150hp water-cooled engine driving a slightly smaller propeller and wing area was increased by slightly increasing the span of the upper wing.

== Specifications (Waterplane 2) ==
Data from British Aircraft 1809-1914

General characteristics

- Crew: 2
- Capacity: 2
- Length: 29 ft 9 in (9.07 m)
- Wingspan: 51 ft 7.5 in (15.735 m)
- Wing area: 560 sq ft (52 m^{2})
- Gross weight: 2,500 lb (1,134 kg)
- Powerplant: 1 × Sunbeam 150hp V-8 water cooled side-valve piston engine, 150 hp (110 kW)
- Propellers: 4-bladed Lang, 9 ft 6 in (2.90 m) diameter

Performance

- Cruise speed: 60 mph (97 km/h, 52 kn)
- Endurance: 10 hours
