= Bristol Gordon England biplanes =

Gordon England biplanes
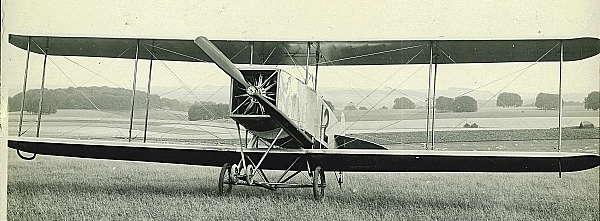
- G.E.2 with Gnome engine

General information
- Type: Military utility aircraft
- Manufacturer: Bristol
- Designer: Eric Gordon England
- Number built: 5

History
- First flight: May 1912

The Bristol Gordon England biplanes were a series of early British military biplane aircraft designed by Eric Gordon England for the Bristol Aeroplane Company that first flew in 1912. Designed for easy ground transport, the aircraft could be quickly disassembled.

== Design and development ==
The first Gordon England design, the G.E.1, was a two-bay equal-span tractor configuration biplane powered by a 50 hp (37 kW) Clerget four-cylinder water-cooled engine, driving the two-bladed propeller via a chain drive giving a 2:1 speed reduction. The crew of two were accommodated side-by-side in a single cockpit, fitted with dual controls. The empennage consisted of a small triangular tailplane and elevators mounted on top of the rectangular-section fuselage and elongated triangular fins above and below the fuselage with the unbalanced rudder mounted on the trailing edge.

After testing during May and June 1912 the fins were removed, and an enlarged aerodynamically balanced rudder fitted. The aircraft was sold to the Deutsche Bristol Werke. However it was found to be unsuitable for use as a trainer, and was returned to the Bristol works at Filton in September 1912 and scrapped.

The G.E.2 was an enlargement and refinement of the previous design. The fuselage was carried on the innermost pairs of interplane struts, so that there was a gap between the fuselage and the lower wing, and a shallow curved fairing was added to the top and bottom of the fuselage. The tailplane was enlarged and mounted in a mid-fuselage position. Two examples were built, one powered by a 100 hp (75 kW) Gnome double Omega twin-row rotary engine and the other with a 70 hp (53 kW) four-cylinder inline water-cooled Daimler. Both were entered in the British military aeroplane trials held in August 1912, the first to be flown by Gordon England and the other by Howard Pixton but were unsuccessful, completing only the quick-assembly tests. The Daimler-engined version proved underpowered, and the other aircraft was damaged in an accident early in the competition, which was won by the Cody V biplane . Bristol did have some success, however: their monoplane design being placed equal third.

The design was further refined in the G.E.3, of which two were built for the Turkish government. This had a fuselage faired to a circular cross-section with the crew in two tandem cockpits, with fuel and oil tanks sufficient for three hours flight between them, and was powered by an 80 hp (60 kW) Gnome Lambda single-row rotary engine threequarters enclosed in a circular cowling. The continuous inmost interplane struts were replaced by short struts between the lower longerons and the lower wing and a cabane consisting of two sets of inverted V struts supplemented by a single strut between the centre of the upper wing and the nose of the aircraft. Trials of the aircraft revealed that the wing spars were too flexible, and although an attempt was made to address this problem by adding short kingpost-bracing to the rear spar, by this time the Italian blockade of Turkey made delivery difficult, and no further development was carried out.

== Variants ==
G.E.1
One built. Powered by 50 hp (40 kW) Clerget inline engine: length 29 ft (8.84 m), wingspan 33 ft 8 in (10.26 m).
G.E.2
Two built — one with a 100 hp (80 kW) Gnome engine, the other with a 70 hp (53 kW) Daimler
G.E.3
Two built. Powered by an 80 hp (60 kW) Gnome Lambda engine, length 28 ft 5 in, (8.63 m), wingspan 39 ft (12 m).

== Specifications (G.E.2, Gnome engine) ==
Data from

General characteristics

- Crew: two, pilot and observer
- Length: 31 ft 0 in (9.45 m)
- Wingspan: 40 ft 0 in (12.20 m)
- Wing area: 400 sq ft (37.2 m^{2})
- Empty weight: 1,080 lb (480 kg)
- Gross weight: 2,000 lb (907 kg)
- Powerplant: 1 × Gnome double Omega 14-cylinder twin-row rotary engine , 100 hp (75 kW)

Performance

- Maximum speed: 68 mph (109 km/h, 59 kn)

== See also ==
- Eric Gordon England
- Gordon England (coachbuilder)
- Gordon England glider

== Bibliography ==
- Barnes, C. H. (1988). Bristol Aircraft since 1910 (3rd ed.). London: Putnam. ISBN 0-851778-232.
- Bruce, J.M. (1982). The Aeroplanes of the Royal Flying Corps (Military Wing). London: Putnam. ISBN 978-0-370-30084-9.
- Lewis, Peter (1962). British Aircraft 1809–1914. London: Putnam.
- Taylor, Michael J. H. (1989). Jane's Encyclopedia of Aviation. London: Studio Editions. p. 204.
