= Gordon England glider =

General information
- Type: single seat glider
- National origin: UK
- Manufacturer: George England (1922) Ltd; Walton-on-Thames
- Designer: Gordon England
- Number built: 1

History
- First flight: 1922

The Gordon England glider was a single seat glider designed specifically for the first British gliding competition held at Itford Hill in 1922, an endurance event. It made some competition flights but was damaged on the last day.

== Design ==
In August 1922 the Daily Mail newspaper offered a £1,000 prize for the longest duration flight by an unpowered, heavier than air aircraft. The competition was to be organized by the Royal Aero Club, who chose the site (Itford Hill, on the Sussex South Downs near Lewes) and the date (16–21 October). This gave competitors six weeks to design, build and transport their entries. 13 arrived in time and one of these was the Gordon England glider, competition number 13, to be flown by its designer, Eric Gordon England, after whom it was named.

The Gordon England glider was a wooden aircraft, constructed by George England (1922) Ltd, (Note: The George England of the company name was Gordon England's father; Gordon also had a brother George, who helped him at Iford. George England (1922) Limited was formed with a capital of £10,000 to purchase the business carried on at Walton-on-Thames as George England Limited, manufacturers of and dealers in aerial conveyances and aircraft of all kinds etc. First directors: G G T Simpson, N A Hodgkinson and E C G England. page 320 Flight magazine, 1 June 1922) in whose name it was entered into the competition. It was a high wing cantilever monoplane. Its wings were slightly tapered, with a little sweep on the leading edge, with blunt tips. The ailerons extended to the wing tips. The tailplane had parallel chord and rounded tips, carrying a single piece elevator. The fin had a rounded leading edge and vertical hinge for the rhomboidal rudder; the rudder's upswept lower edge allowed for elevator deflection.

The fuselage was rectangular in cross-section, with sides rounded and tapered into a slender symmetrical airfoil-like shape. The open cockpit was placed a little behind the leading edge. A pair of half-exposed, unsprung wheels was mounted just within the fuselage, assisted by twin skids under the tail.

== Operational history ==
During practice, non-competition flights on Saturday 14 October England found his rudder ineffective, so he and his brother spent the day enlarging it. On Sunday he made a flight lasting 84 s. On Monday, the first day of competition flights he watched the approach of Anthony Fokker, who had more gliding experience after flying in Germany, then returned a 4 min 32 s flight of his own. Conditions became increasingly windy on Wednesday, with hilltop wind speeds gusting up to 40 mph (65 kmh). Gordon England flew, but could not improve on his time, though he said that was his first landing made travelling backwards. It was windy also on Saturday, the final day of the competition. Trying to return to the top of the ridge, having been blown windward, a gust caught him in a steep turn and the wing tip hit the ground. The glider survived the impact with damage only to the extreme nose but England suffered a broken leg. The competition winner, the French pilot Maneyrol, stayed up for 201 min in his tandem-winged Peyret glider that same day. Gordon England received Mrs C. G. Grey's prize o £10.

It is not known for certain what happened to the glider after the competition, though it may have been used by the gliding club at the RAF Staff College, Andover.

== Specifications ==
Data from British Gliders and Sailplanes p.67

General characteristics

- Capacity: 1
- Length: 17 ft 3 in (5.26 m)
- Wingspan: 28 ft 2 in (8.58 m)
- Wing area: 130.0 sq ft (12.08 m^{2})
- Aspect ratio: 6
- Empty weight: 100 lb (45 kg)
- Gross weight: 260 lb (118 kg)

Performance

- Wing loading: 2.00 lb/sq ft (9.76 kg/m^{2})

== See also ==
- Bristol Gordon England biplanes
- Gordon England (coachbuilder)
- Eric Gordon England
