= List of aircraft (pre-1914) =

This is a chronological list of pioneer aircraft built, planned or conceptualized before 1914. Entries here may or may not be repeated in the main List of aircraft pages.

== Before the 19th century ==
- 400 BC Archytas steam powered pigeon
- 1485 Da Vinci Ornithopter
- 1493 Da Vinci Helicopter
- 1495 Da Vinci Aeroplane
- 1648 Hautsch and Burattini Flying machine
- 1655 Borelli and Hooke Ornithopter
- 1670 Terzi Flying boat
- 1678 Besnier Ornithopter
- 1709 De Gusmao Steam airship
- 1714 Swedenborg Monoplane
- 1742 De Bacqueville Artificial wings
- 1754 Lomonosov Helicopter
- 1764 Bauer Ornithopter
- 1768 Paucton Helicopter
- 1772 Desforges Flying machine
- 1781 Blanchard Flying machine
- 1781 Meerwein Ornithopter
- 1784 Blanchard Airship
- 1784 Charles and Robert Airship
- 1784 Gerard Ornithopter
- 1784 Launoy and Bienvenu Helicopter
- 1784 Meusnier Airship
- 1784 Renaux Ornithopter
- 1784 Thibault Flying machine
- 1788 De Goue Flying machine
- 1793 Aguilera Glider
- 1796 Cayley Helicopter

== 19th century ==
- 1804 Cayley Glider
- 1808 Degen Ornithopter
- 1811 Berblinger Glider
- 1812 Leppig Airship
- 1818 Lambertgye Helicopter
- 1828 Sarti Helicopter
- 1842 Henson Ariel monoplane
- 1843 Cayley Helicopter
- 1845 Cossus Helicopter
- 1848 Cayley Biplane glider
- 1848 Stringfellow Monoplane
- 1849 Porter Airship
- 1850 Jullien Airship
- 1852 Giffard Airship
- 1853 Cayley Glider
- 1853 Letur Flying machine
- 1854 Porter Airship
- 1856 Mouillard Glider No.1
- 1857 Du Temple Monoplane
- 1857 Le Bris Albatross glider
- 1857 Mouillard Glider No.2 and No.3 (1857–1864)
- 1858 Wenham Multiwing glider
- 1861 Amecourt Helicopter
- 1861 Bright Helicopter
- 1861 Nelson Helicopter
- 1862 Crowell Helicopter
- 1862 Powers Helicopter
- 1863 Amecourt Helicopter
- 1863 Andrews Aereon airship
- 1864 Teleshov Mennon Struve Sistema Vosdukhoplavania monoplane
- 1865 Brodbeck Airship
- 1866 Andrews Aereon 2 airship
- 1866 Wenham Monoplane and Multiwing glider
- 1866 Wootton Helicopter
- 1867 Teleshov Delta (rocket engined)
- 1868 Le Bris Albatross II glider
- 1868 Stringfellow Triplane
- 1869 Marriott Avitor airship
- 1870 Penaud Helicopter
- 1871 Penaud Planophore
- 1871 Pomes & Pauze Helicopter (rocket rotor engined)
- 1871 Rykachev Helicopter
- 1872 De Lome Airship
- 1872 Haenlein Airship
- 1872 Maxim Helicopter
- 1873 Penaud Ornithopter
- 1874 Achenbach Helicopter
- 1874 Du Temple Monoplane
- 1874 Penaud Amphibian monoplane
- 1875 Moy Aerial Steamer
- 1876 Penaud Monoplane with enclosed flight deck
- 1876 Ward Helicopter
- 1877 Dieuaide Helicopter
- 1877 Forlanini Helicopter
- 1877 Vuitton Helicopter
- 1878 Castel Helicopter
- 1878 Mouillard Glider No.4 (1878–1895)
- 1878 Ritchel Airship
- 1879 Biot-Massia Glider
- 1879 Greenough Helicopter
- 1879 Melikoff Helicopter
- 1879 Quinby Helicopter
- 1879 Stedman Airship
- 1879 Tatin Monoplane
- 1880 Wolfert Baumgarten Airship
- 1883 Tissandier Airship
- 1884 Goupil Duck
- 1884 Montgomery glider#1 (Gull)
- 1884 Mozhaisky Monoplane
- 1884 Renard Krebs Airship
- 1885 Montgomery glider#2
- 1885 Wolf Airship
- 1886 Montgomery glider#3
- 1887 Langley Glider
- 1888 Herard Flying machine
- 1888 Johnston Helicopter
- 1888 Wolfert Airship
- 1889 Hargrave Flying machine
- 1890 Ader Eole
- 1890 Tatin and Richet Flying machine (1890–1897)
- 1891 Capazza Airship
- 1891 Hargrave Monoplane
- 1891 Lilienthal Derwitzer glider
- 1891 Matyunin Mikst airship (mixed HTA-LTA I. A. Matyunin)
- 1891 Ninomiya Karasu and Tamamushi
- 1892 Ader Avion II
- 1892 Lilienthal Sudende glider
- 1892 Ostoja-Ostaszweski-Mondrzykowski Stibor No.1
- 1893 Herring Glider
- 1893 Lilienthal Klein ornithopter (1893–1896)
- 1893 Lilienthal Maihohe Rhinow glider
- 1893 Phillips 1893 Multi-Wing Flying machine
- 1893 Schwartz Airship
- 1894 Herring Monoplane glider
- 1894 Lanchester Aerodon
- 1894 Lilienthal Normalsegelapparat glider
- 1894 Lilienthal Sturmflugel glider
- 1894 Maxim Flying machine
- 1894 Tanski Glider
- 1895 Lilienthal Gross doppeldecker glider
- 1895 Lilienthal Klein doppeldecker glider
- 1895 Lilienthal Vorflugelapparat glider
- 1895 Pilcher Beetle, Bat and Gull glider
- 1895 Talpade Marutsakha flying machine
- 1896 Chanute Biplane and Multiwing glider
- 1896 airship Deutschland
- 1896 Frost Airship Glider
- 1896 Langley Aerodrome No.5 and No.6
- 1896 Lilienthal Gross ornithopter
- 1897 Ader Avion III
- 1897 Gallaudet Hydroplane glider
- 1897 Nyberg Flugan (1897–1910)
- 1897 Pilcher Hawk glider
- 1897 Schwartz and Berg Airship
- 1898 Gilmore Monoplane
- 1898 Herring Biplane motorglider
- 1898 Santos-Dumont No.1 airship
- 1899 Pilcher Triplane motorglider
- 1899 Santos-Dumont No.2 airship
- 1899 Santos-Dumont No.3 airship
- 1899 Whitehead Flying machine (Gustav Whitehead Weisskopf)

== 1900 ==
- 1900 Santos-Dumont No.4 airship
- 1900 Wright No.1 Glider
- 1900 Zeppelin LZ-1 airship

== 1901 ==
- 1901 Blériot I
- 1901 Kress Floatplane
- 1901 Nemethy Flugrad (Emil von Némethy)
- 1901 Santos-Dumont No.5 airship
- 1901 Santos-Dumont No.6 airship
- 1901 Whitehead No. 21 (Gustav Whitehead Weisskops)
- 1901 Wright No.2 Glider

== 1902 ==
- 1902 Cannon Ezekiel Airship
- 1902 Ferber Biplane glider (Ferdinand Ferber)
- 1902 Lebaudy No.1 airship
- 1902 Santos-Dumont No.7 airship
- 1902 Spencer Airship No.1
- 1902 Wright No.3 glider

== 1903 ==
- 1903 Botts Flying machine
- 1903 Fedorov Five wing plane
- 1903 Jatho Doppeldecker motorgleiter
- 1903 Langley Aerodrome A
- 1903 Lebaudy No.1 Jaune I bis airship
- 1903 Pearse monoplane
- 1903 Santos-Dumont No.9 Baladeuse airship
- 1903 Santos-Dumont No.10 airship
- 1903 Spencer Airship No.2
- 1903 Tatin Mallet Airship
- 1903 Wright Flyer l

== 1904 ==
- 1904 Archdeacon Glider
- 1904 Lebaudy No.1A airship
- 1904 Montgomery Santa Clara tandem glider
- 1904 Phillips 1904 Multi-Wing Flying machine
- 1904 Wright Flyer II

== 1905 ==
- 1905 Blériot II
- 1905 Blériot-Voisin Floatplane glider
- 1905 Ellehammer Monoplane
- 1905 Ferber VI glider
- 1905 Gillespie Aeroplane
- 1905 Jones Aeroplane (Charles Oliver Jones)
- 1905 Lebaudy No.1B airship
- 1905 Lipkovski Helicopter
- 1905 Montgomery California tandem glider
- 1905 Montgomery Defalco tandem glider
- 1905 Santos-Dumont No.11 monoplane
- 1905 Santos-Dumont No.12 helicopter
- 1905 Santos-Dumont No.13 airship
- 1905 Schio Italia I airship
- 1905 Voisin Floatplane glider
- 1905 Willows No.1 airship
- 1905 Wright Flyer III

== 1906 ==
- 1906 Blériot III tandem biplane
- 1906 Blériot IV tandem biplane
- 1906 Bellamy Floatplane
- 1906 Crocco and Ricaldoni Airship 1
- 1906 De La Hault Ornithopter (flapper)
- 1906 Ellehammer No.1 tractor monoplane
- 1906 Ellehammer semi-biplane
- 1906 Gilbert Monoplane (Eugene Gilbert)
- 1906 Godard Airship (French airship built for an American journalist to reach the North Pole)
- 1906 Lebaudy No.1C airship
- 1906 Lebaudy No.2 Patrie airship
- 1906 Parseval Versuchsluftschiff
- 1906 Pischoff et Koechlin Tandem biplane
- 1906 Santos-Dumont No.14A airship
- 1906 Santos-Dumont No.14B airship
- 1906 Santos-Dumont No.14bis Canard
- 1906 Surcouf Airship
- 1906 Vuia I
- 1906 Vuia I bis
- 1906 Zeppelin LZ-2 airship
- 1906 Zeppelin LZ-3 Z-I airship
- 1906 Zodiac No.1 airship

== 1907 ==
- 1907 ABF No.1 NS I and NS II airship (also known as British Army Airship No.1 NS I and NS II)
- 1907 Agusta Biplane (Giovanni Agusta)
- 1907 Blanc and Barlatier Aeroplane
- 1907 Blériot V Canard
- 1907 Blériot VI Libellule
- 1907 Blériot VII monoplane
- 1907 Breguet-Richet Gyroplane No.1
- 1907 Collomb Ornithopter
- 1907 Cornu helicopter
- 1907 De La Vaux Monoplane
- 1907 De Pischoff Tractor biplane
- 1907 Dunne D.1 glider
- 1907 Ellehammer Triplane
- 1907 Equivelly-Montjustin Multiplane
- 1907 Epps Monoplane
- 1907 Esnault-Pelterie REP.1
- 1907 Etrich-Wels I
- 1907 Farman HF.I pusher biplane (Henri Farman)
- 1907 Ferber VIII
- 1907 Gammeter Orthopter
- 1907 Gross-Basenach Versuchsluftschiff
- 1907 Koechlin No.1 biplane
- 1907 Lebaudy No.2A airship
- 1907 Phillips 1907 Multi-Wing Flying machine
- 1907 Santos-Dumont No.15 biplane
- 1907 Santos-Dumont No.16 airship
- 1907 Santos-Dumont No.19 Demoiselle
- 1907 Santos-Dumont No.19bis Demoiselle
- 1907 Sautereau Biplane
- 1907 Seux Monoplane (Edmond Seux)
- 1907 Torres-Quevedo No.1 airship
- 1907 Voisin 1907 biplane
- 1907 Voisin HF.I biplane
- 1907 Vuia II
- 1907 Wright Model A

== 1908 ==
- 1908 AEA June Bug
- 1908 AEA Loon pontoon floatplane
- 1908 AEA Red Wing
- 1908 AEA Silver Dart
- 1908 AEA White Wing
- 1908 Antoinette IV
- 1908 Antoinette V
- 1908 Astra-Clement-Bayard No.1 airship
- 1908 Astra-Kapferer Tandem plane
- 1908 Auffin-Ordt Monoplane
- 1908 Baldwin SC-1 airship
- 1908 Bates Biplane I
- 1908 Bates Biplane II
- 1908 Berliner-Williams Helicopter
- 1908 Bertin Compound helicopter
- 1908 Blanc et Barlatier Monoplane
- 1908 Blériot VIII monoplane
- 1908 Blériot IX monoplane
- 1908 Blériot X biplane
- 1908 Blériot XI monoplane
- 1908 Bocker Triplane
- 1908 Bonnet-Labranche No.1 pusher biplane
- 1908 Bonnet-Labranche No.2 pusher biplane
- 1908 Bousson Borguis Triplane
- 1908 Breguet-Richet Gyroplane No.2
- 1908 Cody I biplane (also known as British Army Aeroplane No.1 of Cody 'Cathedral')
- 1908 De Caters Triplane
- 1908 Delagrange No.2 biplane
- 1908 Delagrange No.3 biplane
- 1908 Dernaut Monoplane
- 1908 Denhaut-Bouyer-Mercier Biplane
- 1908 Dufaux Tractor dreidecker
- 1908 Dunne D.4
- 1908 Ellehammer IV tractor biplane
- 1908 Esnault-Pelterie REP 2 monoplane
- 1908 Etrich-Wels Tailless parasol
- 1908 Etrich-Wels Tractor monoplane
- 1908 Euler No.3 doppeldecker
- 1908 Farman HF.Ibis pusher triplane (Henri Farman)
- 1908 Farman HF Flying fish monoplane
- 1908 Ferber IX (also known as Antoinette III)
- 1908 Gasnier Biplane (René Gasnier)
- 1908 Gastambide-Mengin I (also known as Antoinette I)
- 1908 Gastambide-Mengin II (also known as Antoinette II)
- 1908 Geisler Eindecker
- 1908 Goupy Triplane
- 1908 Grade Dreidecker
- 1908 Gross-Basenach M I airship
- 1908 Guilbaut Tandem monoplane
- 1908 Guyot et Verdier Biplane
- 1908 Hippsich Eindecker (maybe 1908)
- 1908 Italian Μilitary Αirship No.1
- 1908 Jatho IV doppeldecker motorgleiter
- 1908 Kapferer Tandem monoplane
- 1908 Lebaudy No.3 Republique airship
- 1908 Leray Triplane
- 1908 Liore No.1
- 1908 Lorenzen Helicopter
- 1908 Luyties Otto Helicopter
- 1908 Ostoja-Ostaszweski Stibor No.2 ornithopter
- 1908 Ostoja-Ostaszweski Stibor No.3 ornithopter
- 1908 Passat Ornithopter
- 1908 Pean Monoplane
- 1908 Pischoff et Koechlin Tandem monoplane
- 1908 Quick Monoplane
- 1908 Robart 1 1.2 monoplane
- 1908 Robinson Monoplane
- 1908 Roe I Biplane
- 1908 Roshon Multiplane
- 1908 Santos-Dumont No.20 Demoiselle
- 1908 Schneider No.1 biplane (Frederick Schneider)
- 1908 Scholtz Flying machine
- 1908 Sellers No.5 quadriplane
- 1908 Seux-Roesch Biplane
- 1908 Shabsky Uchebny airship
- 1908 Torres-Quevedo No.2 airship
- 1908 Tatin Monoplane
- 1908 Tips Canard biplane
- 1908 Vaniman Triplane
- 1908 Vendome No.2 monoplane
- 1908 Voisin HF.Ibis biplane
- 1908 Voisin Standard biplane
- 1908 Vuitton-Huber Helicopter
- 1908 Williams Quadriplane
- 1908 Witzig-Liore-Dutilleul Biplane
- 1908 Zens Pusher biplane
- 1908 Zeppelin LZ-4.2 airship
- 1908 Zeppelin LZ-4.3 airship
- 1908 Zerbe Sextuplane (James Slough Zerbe)

== 1909 ==
- 1909 ABF No.2A airship (also known as British Army Airship No.2A)
- 1909 ABF No.3 airship (also known as British Army Airship No.3)
- 1909 Abric-Calas Glider
- 1909 Abric-Calas Biplane
- 1909 Aerial Manufacturing monoplane
- 1909 Aerocar Monoplane
- 1909 Aeromarine Flying boat
- 1909 Aimé-Salmson Autoplane
- 1909 Aldasoro Monoplane
- 1909 AMA Biplane
- 1909 Antoinette VI
- 1909 Antoinette VII
- 1909 Antoinette VIII
- 1909 Antoni Monoplane
- 1909 Anzani Tractor monoplane
- 1909 Armitage Monoplane 1 seater
- 1909 Arnoux Flying wing
- 1909 ASL monoplane No.1
- 1909 Astley Monoplane
- 1909 Auffin-Ordt Monoplane
- 1909 A.V.I.A. Monoplane
- 1909 A.V.I.A. Vedette biplane
- 1909 Avioplan
- 1909 Baddeck No. 1
- 1909 Baddeck No. 2
- 1909 Barnwell Canard biplane
- 1909 Barillon Monoplane No.1
- 1909 Barrillon Monoplane No.2
- 1909 Beach-Willard Monoplane
- 1909 Beilharz Eindecker
- 1909 Blackburn Dart triplane
- 1909 Blackburn-Walker biplane
- 1909 Blériot XII highwing monoplane
- 1909 Bobenreith Biplane
- 1909 Bokor Triplane
- 1909 Bonnet-Labranche ABL monoplane
- 1909 Bonnet-Labranche No.3 pusher biplane
- 1909 Borgnis Tailless pusher triplane
- 1909 Boutaric Triplane
- 1909 Bradshaw Monoplane
- 1909 Brauner and Smith Biplane
- 1909 Breguet I tractor biplane
- 1909 Breguet II tractor biplane
- 1909 Britain Triplane
- 1909 BRT Biplane
- 1909 Brunet-Olivert Biplane
- 1909 Bulot Triplane (Belgian Walther Bulot)
- 1909 Burchard Triplane
- 1909 Burlingame Monoplane
- 1909 Canton et Unne Push-pull triplane
- 1909 Caproni Ca.1 (1910)
- 1909 Caudron A tractor biplane
- 1909 Cazalot et Prevot Biplane
- 1909 Chapiro Biplane
- 1909 Chaussee Biplane
- 1909 Chauviere No.1 monoplane
- 1909 Chauviere No.2 biplane
- 1909 Chedeville Monoplane
- 1909 Christmas Red Bird I biplane
- 1909 Clement M monoplane
- 1909 Clerget Monoplane
- 1909 Cluzan Biplane
- 1909 Cobianchi Brescia Biplane
- 1909 Cobioni Monoplane
- 1909 Copin Tractor biplane
- 1909 Cremp Monoplane
- 1909 Crocco and Ricaldoni P1 airship
- 1909 Curtiss Golden Flyer
- 1909 Curtiss Reims Racer
- 1909 Cuthbertson I and II pusher biplane
- 1909 Daimler Lutskoy No.1 monoplane
- 1909 De Feure-Deperdussin Monoplane
- 1909 De Havilland Biplane No. 1
- 1909 De Laminne Biplane (Chevalier Louis de Laminne)
- 1909 De Silva Biplane
- 1909 Du Reau Monoplane
- 1909 Dufaux 4 doppeldecker
- 1909 Dufaux Tiltrotor
- 1909 Dufaux Tractor doppeldecker
- 1909 Ellehammer Standard monoplane
- 1909 Eparvier Monoplane
- 1909 Epps Monoplane
- 1909 Etrich Nurflugel tractor monoplane
- 1909 Etrich Taube tractor monoplane
- 1909 Etrich-Wels Praterspatz tractor monoplane
- 1909 Euler Pusher doppeldecker 1 seater
- 1909 Euler-Voisin Pusher biplane
- 1909 Faccioli No.2 triplane
- 1909 Faccioli No.3 biplane
- 1909 Faludy III biplane
- 1909 Farman HF.II tractor biplane
- 1909 Farman HF.III pusher biplane
- 1909 Farman HF.IV pusher biplane
- 1909 Farman MF.I pusher biplane (Maurice Farman)
- 1909 Farman-Sommer Biplane
- 1909 Faure Monoplane
- 1909 Ferguson Tractor monoplane
- 1909 Fernandez No.2 biplane
- 1909 Fernandez No.3 Aeral biplane
- 1909 Ford-Van Auken mono tractor plane
- 1909 Forlanini F.1 Da Vinci airship
- 1909 Gakkel I
- 1909 Gebauer Airplane
- 1909 Germe Biplane
- 1909 Gilbert Monoplane
- 1909 Gilly Triplane
- 1909 Givaudan Aerofoil multicellplane
- 1909 Godard Goldschmidt Airship
- 1909 Goupy I triplane
- 1909 Goupy II biplane
- 1909 Grade Eindecker
- 1909 Grandjean Eindecker
- 1909 Greene Biplane
- 1909 Gregoire Monoplane 1
- 1909 Grose & Feary Monoplane
- 1909 Gross-Basenach M II airship
- 1909 Gross-Basenach M III airship
- 1909 Guyot-Cellier Tandem biplane
- 1909 Hammond Biplane
- 1909 Handley Page Glider
- 1909 Hanriot 1909 monoplane
- 1909 Heath Monoplane
- 1909 Hespel Monoplane
- 1909 Hieronymus I
- 1909 Howard Wright 1909 Biplane
- 1909 Howard Wright 1909 Barber monoplane
- 1909 Howard Wright 1909 Cooke monoplane
- 1909 Howard Wright 1909 monoplane
- 1909 Howard Wright 1909 Lascelles Ornis
- 1909 Humphreys Biplane
- 1909 IAL Monoplane
- 1909 Italian Μilitary Αirship No.1bis
- 1909 Kaspar-Cihak Monoplane
- 1909 Kluytman Twin pusher biplane
- 1909 Koechlin A monoplane
- 1909 Kremp Yu Monoplane
- 1909 La Belgique Airship
- 1909 La Flandre Airship (Henri Farman)
- 1909 Lambert Airship (Henri Farman)
- 1909 Lamine Biplane
- 1909 Lamoureux Monoplane
- 1909 Lasternas Biplane
- 1909 Lebaudy No.4 airship
- 1909 Lebaudy No.5 Liberte airship
- 1909 Le Prieur-Aihara Glider
- 1909 Legagnoux Biplane
- 1909 Legras Biplane
- 1909 Lejeune Biplane
- 1909 Lejeune Modified biplane
- 1909 Lepin Triplane
- 1909 Lepousse Aerotorpille
- 1909 Letord et Niepce Monoplane
- 1909 Ling Monoplane
- 1909 Liwentaal Libellule tandem biplane
- 1909 Loose Monoplane
- 1909 Lutskoy I rotary wing apparatus
- 1909 Macfie monoplane
- 1909 Marchand Monoplane (Henri Farman)
- 1909 Marchetti Chimera biplane
- 1909 Martin Pusher biplane
- 1909 Martinet Biplane
- 1909 Maxfield Monoplane
- 1909 Mazoyer Monoplane
- 1909 McDowell Monoplane
- 1909 Mercep Biplane
- 1909 Miller Monoplane
- 1909 Moisant L'Ecrevisse Monoplane
- 1909 Moore-Brabazon
- 1909 Moreau Aerostable monoplane
- 1909 Neale Monoplane
- 1909 Nemethy Eindecker
- 1909 Nieuport Monoplane
- 1909 Obre Biplane
- 1909 Obre Biplane No.2
- 1909 Page-Light Biplane
- 1909 Parseval Aeroboat
- 1909 Parseval PL-1 airship
- 1909 Parseval PL-2 P-I airship
- 1909 Parseval PL-3 P-II airship
- 1909 Paulhan biplane
- 1909 Pischoff et Koechlin Monoplane
- 1909 Pischoff-Koechlin-Piquerez Biplane
- 1909 Platel Monoplane
- 1909 Ponzelli-Miller Aerocurvo monoplane
- 1909 Pride Monoplane
- 1909 Prosper Monoplane
- 1909 Raiche-Crout Biplane
- 1909 Rickman Helicopter (bicycle aircraft)
- 1909 Roe I Triplane
- 1909 Rossel-Peugeot Biplane
- 1909 Rumpler Taube
- 1909 Rusjan EDA I biplane
- 1909 Rusjan EDA II
- 1909 Rusjan EDA III
- 1909 Saint Marcq Airship
- 1909 Salamanca Biplane
- 1909 Sanchis Biplane
- 1909 Sanders No.1 biplane
- 1909 Santos-Dumont No.21 Demoiselle
- 1909 Santos-Dumont No.22 Demoiselle
- 1909 Saul No.1 tandem biplane
- 1909 Savary Tractor biplane
- 1909 SCAA Fregates Monoplane
- 1909 Scottish Aeroplane Syndicate Avis (Howard T. Wright designer W.O. Manning)
- 1909 SELA 1 monoplane
- 1909 Sellers No.6 quadriplane
- 1909 Short Biplane No.1
- 1909 Short Biplane No.2
- 1909 Siemens-Bourcart Doppeldecker
- 1909 Sikorsky S-1 helicopter
- 1909 Soltau Sturmvogel ornithopter
- 1909 Sorokin Helicopter
- 1909 Stebbins-Geynet Pusher triplane
- 1909 Stoeckel Monoplane
- 1909 Stolfa Aeroplane
- 1909 Svachulay Hummingbird I
- 1909 Sverchkov Cyclogyro
- 1909 Tanski Latka monoplane
- 1909 Tatarinov Aeromobile
- 1909 Tips Pusher biplane
- 1909 Tucek I 1 seater monoplane
- 1909 Tupolev Glider
- 1909 UFA Monoplane
- 1909 UFA Triplane
- 1909 Ueda Hiryu-Go Biplane
- 1909 Usuelli U.1 airship (non-rigid airship designed by Celestino Usuelli)
- 1909 Vandenbergh Flapper (ornithopter like)
- 1909 Vasserot Glider
- 1909 Vendome La Moustique monoplane
- 1909 Vendome No.3 monoplane
- 1909 Vendome No.3bis monoplane
- 1909 Verdaguer Biplane
- 1909 Vernander APV
- 1909 Vlemincckz Biplane
- 1909 Voisin Bird of Passage pusher biplane
- 1909 Voisin Tractor biplane
- 1909 Vosgiens Biplane
- 1909 Vreedenburgh Monoplane
- 1909 Walden No.3 monoplane
- 1909 Walden Tandem biplane
- 1909 Watkins Monoplane
- 1909 Weiss Flying wing glider
- 1909 Willows No.2 airship
- 1909 Windham Monoplane No.1
- 1909 WLD No.2 biplane
- 1909 Wright Military Flyer
- 1909 Wright Model A transitional
- 1909 Zalewski WZ-I
- 1909 Zeppelin LZ-5 Z-II airship
- 1909 Zeppelin LZ-6 airship
- 1909 Zipfel Biplane
- 1909 Zipfel Triplane
- 1909 Zodiac No.2 airship
- 1909 Zodiac No.3 airship
- 1909 Zodiac No.4 airship
- 1909 Zolyi Biplane (Adalar Zolyi also known as Zoelgi)
- 1909 Zornes Biplane (Charles A. Zornes)

== 1910 ==
- 1910 Abberly Biplane
- 1910 ABF Beta I and Beta II airship (also known as British Army Airship Beta I and Beta II)
- 1910 ABF Gamma I and Gamma II airship (also known as British Army Airship Gamma I and Gamma II)
- 1910 Adorjan Libelle monoplane
- 1910 Adorjan Strucc monoplane
- 1910 AEG Z1 doppeldecker
- 1910 Aeromarine 8 pusher canard
- 1910 Agapov Farman Sommer Biplane
- 1910 Ago Doppeldecker
- 1910 Agusta Glider
- 1910 Albatros Biplane
- 1910 Albert Monoplane (Jean Albert)
- 1910 Albessard Tandem monoplane (La Balancelle)
- 1910 Alexander Monoplane
- 1910 Alfaro ACA glider
- 1910 Alkan Le Enfin (Oscar Alkan)
- 1910 Andrews Pusher biplane
- 1910 Angelis Biplane
- 1910 Antonov Helicoplane
- 1910 Armitage Monoplane 2 seater
- 1910 Armstrong Monoplane
- 1910 Ask-Nyrop 1 Grasshoppan monoplane
- 1910 ASL monoplane No.2
- 1910 ASL Valkyrie A, B and C
- 1910 Astra-Wright Biplane
- 1910 Astra-Wright E biplane
- 1910 Aubry Meteor monoplane
- 1910 Audineau Monoplane
- 1910 Auffin-Ordt Monoplane
- 1910 Aventino-Mingozi-Paletta Monoplane
- 1910 A.V.I.A. Biplane
- 1910 Aviatik Doppeldecker
- 1910 Aviator Monoplane
- 1910 Baden-Powell Monoplane
- 1910 Baldwin Red Devil biplane
- 1910 Bell Mike Monoplane
- 1910 Benegent Monoplane
- 1910 Bertin Monoplane
- 1910 Bertrand Ducted-propeller monoplane
- 1910 Bilek Monoplane
- 1910 Black Diamond pusher biplane
- 1910 Bland Mayfly
- 1910 Blériot XI Circuit de l'Est
- 1910 Blériot XIII
- 1910 Blériot XIV
- 1910 Bloudek-Potucek-Cermak Racek monoplane
- 1910 BMFW Stahleindecker
- 1910 Bokor II biplane
- 1910 Bonnet-Labrance No.6 School
- 1910 Bonnet-Labrance No.7 Racer
- 1910 Borel Pusher monoplane
- 1910 Bothy Monoplane
- 1910 Bourdariat Biplane
- 1910 Bracke Monoplane
- 1910 Breguet III tractor biplane
- 1910 Bristol Boxkite
- 1910 Brooks Biplane
- 1910 Brunet Tandem biplane
- 1910 Brzeski Aquila monoplane
- 1910 Bueno et Demaurex Pusher biplane
- 1910 Burgess A pusher biplane
- 1910 Burgess B pusher biplane
- 1910 Burgess D pusher biplane
- 1910 Bylinkin Iordan Sikorsky BIS No.1 biplane
- 1910 Bylinkin Iordan Sikorsky BIS No.2 biplane
- 1910 Bylinkin Monoplane
- 1910 Canadian Aerodrome Co. Hubbard II Mike
- 1910 Canton et Unne Push-pull monoplane
- 1910 Caproni Ca.2 (1910)
- 1910 Caproni Ca.3 (1910)
- 1910 Carid Monoplane
- 1910 Caudron A2-6 tractor biplane
- 1910 Caux et Camboulive Biplane
- 1910 Cerny Monoplane
- 1910 Chapiro Biplane No.2
- 1910 Chassany Monoplane
- 1910 Chesnay Monoplane
- 1910 Christie Monoplane
- 1910 Cihak C monoplane
- 1910 Clement-Bayard No.2 airship
- 1910 Clement M Pusher biplane
- 1910 Clerget Monoplane
- 1910 Clerget-Etrich Taube (Gustave Aman)
- 1910 Clouth Airship
- 1910 Coanda jet biplane (jet engined)
- 1910 Cody Michelin Cup Biplane
- 1910 Collier Monoplane
- 1910 Collyer-Lang Otasel monoplane
- 1910 Contal No.2 monoplane
- 1910 Contal Tractor monoplane
- 1910 Cordner Monoplane No.1
- 1910 Courrejou Tractor monoplane
- 1910 Crocco and Ricaldoni P2 airship
- 1910 Culver Biplane
- 1910 Curtiss Bennett Racer monoplane
- 1910 Curtiss Ely monoplane
- 1910 Curtiss Hudson Flyer biplane
- 1910 Curtiss-Willard Banshee Express
- 1910 Daily Old Glory Biplane
- 1910 Daimler Lutskoy No.2 monoplane
- 1910 Dajoigny et Beaussart Simplex monoplane
- 1910 Danton Back staggered racing biplane
- 1910 Day Tractor biplane
- 1910 De Coster Flugi monoplane
- 1910 De Feure-Deperdussin Canard
- 1910 De Feure-Deperdussin No.2 monoplane
- 1910 De Havilland Biplane No. 2
- 1910 De La Hault Monoplane
- 1910 De Lailhacar Monoplane
- 1910 Denhaut Danton Biplane (Le Danton designed by Denhaut)
- 1910 Deperdussin Canard monoplane
- 1910 Deperdussin Type A monoplane
- 1910 Desusclade Monoplane
- 1910 Dokuchaev 1 biplane
- 1910 Dorner II eindecker
- 1910 Dottori Biplane 2 props
- 1910 DSL Sao Paulo Monoplane (Dimitri Sensaud de Lavaud)
- 1910 Dufour No.1 monoplane
- 1910 Dufour No.2 biplane
- 1910 Duigan pusher biplane
- 1910 Dumas Monoplane
- 1910 Dunne D.5
- 1910 Dunne-Huntington triplane
- 1910 Eaton-Twining Monoplane
- 1910 Esnault-Pelterie REP B monoplane
- 1910 Esnault-Pelterie REP D monoplane
- 1910 Epps Monoplane
- 1910 Escofet II Biplane
- 1910 Etrich II modified Taube tractor monoplane
- 1910 Etrich II Taube 2-seater tractor monoplane
- 1910 Etrich III Möve (Seagull) tractor monoplane
- 1910 Etrich IV Taube tractor monoplane
- 1910 Etrich V Taube tractor monoplane
- 1910 Etrich VI Taube tractor monoplane
- 1910 Euler Military pusher doppeldecker
- 1910 Everett-Edgecumbe Monoplane
- 1910 Fabre Hydravion pusher canard
- 1910 Faccioli No.4 biplane
- 1910 Fairchild Monoplane
- 1910 Farman Coupe Michelin Biplane
- 1910 Farman Freres Biplane
- 1910 Farman HF.II-2 parasol tractor monoplane
- 1910 Farman HF.V
- 1910 Ferguson No.2 monoplane
- 1910 Fiedler Eindecker
- 1910 Filiasi Biplane
- 1910 Fokker I
- 1910 Forssmann Airship
- 1910 Fournier Monoplane
- 1910 Francis Pusher biplane
- 1910 Gakkel II
- 1910 Gakkel III biplane
- 1910 Gallone-Lampert Monoplane
- 1910 Gambier Monoplane
- 1910 Garnier Olga monoplane
- 1910 Gasnier Biplane
- 1910 Gates Biplane
- 1910 George & Jobling Biplane
- 1910 Gibson No.2 biplane
- 1910 Gibson No.3 biplane with twin tractor propellers
- 1910 Gibson Twin plane
- 1910 Goedecker No.1 eindecker
- 1910 Gold Biplane (Willibald Gold)
- 1910 Graf Napoli 1 monoplane
- 1910 Greene 1910 Biplane
- 1910 Gregoire Monoplane 2
- 1910 Gregoire Monoplane 3
- 1910 Grizodubov 1
- 1910 Grizodubov 2
- 1910 Grizodubov 3
- 1910 Guillebaud Tandem monoplane
- 1910 Guillemin Biplane
- 1910 Gunn Biplane
- 1910 Guyard Monoplane No.2
- 1910 Hackel-RBWZ Biplane
- 1910 Handley Page A Bluebird monoplane
- 1910 Handley Page B
- 1910 Hanriot Monoplane
- 1910 Harroun Monoplane
- 1910 Hartman monoplane
- 1910 Heinrich A monoplane
- 1910 Henry Canard monoplane
- 1910 Herring-Burgess Flying fish biplane
- 1910 Hornstein Biplane
- 1910 Horvath 1B monoplane
- 1910 Howard Wright 1910 Monoplane
- 1910 Howard Wright 1910 Biplane
- 1910 Howard Wright Avis monoplane
- 1910 Howard Wright Demoiselle monoplane
- 1910 Howard Wright Bleriot monoplane
- 1910 Howard Wright Curtiss biplane
- 1910 Howard Wright Ornis monoplane
- 1910 Hudson-O'Brian Biplane
- 1910 Hulbert Biplane
- 1910 Humber Le Blon monoplane
- 1910 Humber Lovelace 1 monoplane
- 1910 Humber-Bleriot monoplane
- 1910 Humber-Sommer biplane
- 1910 Humber Tractor biplane
- 1910 Illinschulz
- 1910 Izhora No.1 Pigeon airship
- 1910 Izhora No.2 Sokol airship
- 1910 Izhora No.3 Albatros airship
- 1910 Jacquelin Tractor biplane
- 1910 JAP Harding Monoplane
- 1910 Jeannin Doppeldecker
- 1910 Jezzi No.1 pusher biplane
- 1910 Jezzi No.1 tractor biplane
- 1910 Jirotka Monoplane
- 1910 Joachimczyk Monoplane
- 1910 Jourdan Helioplane
- 1910 Kalep
- 1910 Karpeka 1 monoplane
- 1910 Kasyanenko 1 and 1bis biplane
- 1910 Kaufmann No.1 monoplane
- 1910 Koechlin Monoplane
- 1910 Kolbanyi I biplane
- 1910 Kolousek Biplane
- 1910 Kowalski Biplane
- 1910 Kozlowski Biplane
- 1910 Kudashev 1 biplane (Кудашев 1)
- 1910 Kudashev 2 biplane
- 1910 Kudashev 3 monoplane
- 1910 Kvasz I monoplane
- 1910 Lane No.1 monoplane
- 1910 Lane Pusher biplane
- 1910 Lange-Billard Triangular wing monoplane
- 1910 Lanyi Biplane
- 1910 Lascelles Ornis
- 1910 Lebaudy No.5A airship
- 1910 Lebaudy No.6 airship
- 1910 Lebaudy No.7 airship
- 1910 Lecoq-Monteiro-Aillaud Monoplane
- 1910 Legnano I monoplane
- 1910 Legrand Triplane
- 1910 Lemaitre Biplane
- 1910 Leroy et Marzollier Monoplane
- 1910 Lesseps La frigate monoplane
- 1910 Letai I biplane
- 1910 Letord et Niepce Biplane
- 1910 Libanski Jaskolka monoplane
- 1910 Libanski Mono-Biplan I
- 1910 Linon Monoplane (André Linon and Louis Linon)
- 1910 Liore No.2 monoplane
- 1910 Ljusik Monoplane
- 1910 Lohner-Daimler Pfeilflieger I doppeldecker
- 1910 Lohner-Umlauff Doppeldecker
- 1910 Macchi-Nieuport Biplane
- 1910 Macfie Empress biplane
- 1910 Mainguet Tractor monoplane with enclosed flight deck
- 1910 Mann & Overton Monoplane
- 1910 Martin-Handasyde No.3
- 1910 McCormick-James Monoplane
- 1910 Meduna Monoplane
- 1910 Mercep-Rusjan Monoplane
- 1910 Michelet Biplane
- 1910 Moisant Le Corbeau monoplane
- 1910 Montgomery Tandem monoplane
- 1910 Moon Moonbeam No.1 and No.2
- 1910 Morel Canard 2 and 3 seater biplane
- 1910 Mulliner Monoplane
- 1910 Mullot Monoplane
- 1910 Mullot Biplane
- 1910 Myers Glider
- 1910 Nau Monoplane
- 1910 Neal VI monoplane
- 1910 Neal VII biplane
- 1910 Nicholson Monoplane
- 1910 Nieuport II monoplane
- 1910 Nieuport III 2 seater monoplane
- 1910 Norman and Knight Monoplane
- 1910 Nyrop No.3 monoplane
- 1910 Obre No.3 monoplane
- 1910 Ocenasek Monoplane 2 seater
- 1910 Odier-Vendome Pusher biplane
- 1910 Odier-Vendome Tractor biplane
- 1910 Pachiotti Monoplane
- 1910 Parent Monoplane
- 1910 Parkes Monoplane
- 1910 Parseval PL-6 airship
- 1910 Parseval PL-7 airship
- 1910 Parseval Seaplane
- 1910 Passerat-Radiguet Monoplane
- 1910 Paterson No.1 biplane
- 1910 Paulhan biplane
- 1910 Paumier Biplane
- 1910 Pega Emich Sechsdecker
- 1910 Penkala Leptir I biplane
- 1910 Penkala Leptir II biplane
- 1910 Pfitzner Monoplane
- 1910 Picat-Dubreuit Monoplane
- 1910 Piccoli Ausonia airship
- 1910 Piggott Biplane
- 1910 Pither Monoplane
- 1910 Pivot Monoplane
- 1910 Plage I biplane
- 1910 Planes Biplane
- 1910 Pliska Biplane
- 1910 Poignard et Tranchard Monoplane
- 1910 Pollock Monoplane
- 1910 Porte Monoplane
- 1910 Portway Monoplane
- 1910 Poulain Orange No.1 biplane
- 1910 Poynter Monoplane
- 1910 Prazma Biplane
- 1910 Pulpe
- 1910 Ragot Canard monoplane
- 1910 Raiche Biplane
- 1910 Rajki Monoplane
- 1910 Reader Allen Sheffield RAS Monoplane
- 1910 Rebikov Schetinin Rossia A biplane
- 1910 Rebikov Schetinin Rossia B monoplane
- 1910 Requillard Monoplane
- 1910 Rhodes Aeroplane
- 1910 Roe II triplane
- 1910 Roe III triplane
- 1910 Roehrig Pusher biplane
- 1910 Romanoplane Pusher monoplane
- 1910 Rosenman-Rolzewski Tandem Coleopter
- 1910 Rossel-Peugeot monoplane
- 1910 Rozum-Bechiny Monoplane
- 1910 Rougier biplane
- 1910 Rusjan EDA V monoplane
- 1910 Rusjan EDA VI
- 1910 Rusjan EDA VII
- 1910 SFLA Monoplane
- 1910 Sanchez-Besa Biplane
- 1910 Saulnier No.1 monoplane
- 1910 Saulnier No.2 monoplane
- 1910 Savary Biplane
- 1910 SBS Monoplane of the three (Aleksander Sokalski, Kazimierz Baszniak, Wlodzimierz Semiula)
- 1910 SCAA Fregates Monoplane
- 1910 Schindler Aquila monoplane (Henryk Brzeski (engine), Rudolf Schindler and Wincenty Schindler (airframe))
- 1910 Schlegel Zust Monoplane
- 1910 Schmitt Biplane
- 1910 Schroth ED
- 1910 Schuler Doppeldecker
- 1910 Sclaves Biplane
- 1910 Scottish Aeroplane Syndicate Avis
- 1910 Seddon Tandem biplane
- 1910 SELA No.2 monoplane
- 1910 SFLA Monoplane
- 1910 Shkolin Russian Monoplane
- 1910 Short No.3 biplane
- 1910 Short S.27 pusher biplane
- 1910 Siemens-Bourcart Doppeldecker (SSW, Max Bourcart)
- 1910 Sikorsky S-2 helicopter
- 1910 Sikorsky S-3 tractor biplane
- 1910 Sikorsky S-4 biplane
- 1910 Simplex Monoplane
- 1910 Sippe Monoplane
- 1910 Sloan Bicurve biplane
- 1910 Smidley Monoplane
- 1910 Smith Pusher biplane 2 props
- 1910 Smith Rex Biplane 2 seater
- 1910 Sommer 1910 biplane
- 1910 Sommerville Pusher biplane
- 1910 Souchet Monoplane
- 1910 Spencer-Stirling Biplane
- 1910 Star Monoplane
- 1910 Stasenko Lyusik monoplane
- 1910 Stein Eindecker
- 1910 Svachulay Albatrosz I
- 1910 Szarics I monoplane
- 1910 Szekely I biplane
- 1910 Tan Gen Hydroplane
- 1910 Taris Monoplane
- 1910 Tellier Monoplane
- 1910 Thiersch Monoplane
- 1910 Thomann Monoplane
- 1910 Thomas Pusher biplane
- 1910 Thomas TA amphibian pusher flying boat
- 1910 Thompson Biplane
- 1910 Tips Biplane
- 1910 Todd Biplane
- 1910 Toth I monoplane
- 1910 Train No.1 monoplane
- 1910 Tubavion Monoplane
- 1910 Turcat-Mery-Rougier Biplane
- 1910 Ufimtsev Spheroplane 1
- 1910 Ufimtsev Spheroplane 2
- 1910 Van Anden Biplane
- 1910 Vasserot Mouette Geante monoplane (Giant Seagull)
- 1910 Vendome Tiny monoplane
- 1910 Vinet A monoplane
- 1910 Vlaicu I
- 1910 Voisin Bordeaux
- 1910 Voisin Militaire biplane
- 1910 Voisin Tourisme biplane
- 1910 Voisin Type de Course biplane
- 1910 Vollmoeller Monoplane
- 1910 Walden No.4 monoplane
- 1910 Warchalowski I 1 seater pusher biplane
- 1910 Warchalowski II and IIbis 2 seater pusher biplane
- 1910 Warchalowski III 1 seater pusher biplane
- 1910 Weber Sochacki Pusher biplane 2 seater
- 1910 Weidmann Flying tank monoplane
- 1910 Weiss Flying wing glider
- 1910 White and Thompson No.1
- 1910 Willard Biplane
- 1910 Willoughby Pelican tractor flying boat
- 1910 Willows No.3 airship
- 1910 Wills Monoplane (Indian Wilfred Wills)
- 1910 Wiseman Biplane
- 1910 Wiseman Pusher biplane
- 1910 Wisniewski Monoplane 1 seater
- 1910 Wright Baby Grand
- 1910 Wright Model B
- 1910 Wright Model R
- 1910 Wright Roadster
- 1910 Wrobel Monoplane
- 1910 Yamada No.1 airship
- 1910 Yuriev Helicopter
- 1910 Zenith Monoplane
- 1910 Zeppelin LZ-7 Deutschland airship
- 1910 Zodiac L'Albatros No.1 monoplane
- 1910 Zodiac L'Albatros No.2 monoplane
- 1910 Zodiac No.5 airship
- 1910 Zodiac No.6 and No.6A airship
- 1910 Zodiac No.7 airship
- 1910 Zodiac No.8 airship
- 1910 Zodiac No.9 airship
- 1910 Zselyi Eindecker
- 1910 Zselyi Eindecker II

== 1911 ==
- 1911 Adelmann Doppeldecker
- 1911 AEG Z2 eindecker
- 1911 Aitken Biplane
- 1911 Albatros Doppeldecker
- 1911 Albatros MZ2 doppeldecker
- 1911 Albatros SZ1
- 1911 Albatros-Pietschker Renndoppeldecker (Albatros SZ1)
- 1911 Antoinette military monoplane
- 1911 Antoinette Monobloc
- 1911 Arondel Monoplane
- 1911 Artigala Argentino 1ro (Enrique Artigalá)
- 1911 Ask Monoplane
- 1911 Asteria No.3 pusher biplane
- 1911 Astra C biplane
- 1911 Astra Concourse militaire biplane
- 1911 Astra-Torres AT-1 airship
- 1911 Aviatic Biplane
- 1911 B-S Monoplane
- 1911 Balsan Monoplane
- 1911 Barillon No.3 monoplane
- 1911 Barnwell Monoplane
- 1911 Bartelt Ornithopter
- 1911 Barucki I monoplane
- 1911 Barucki II Biplane
- 1911 Bastier Biplane
- 1911 Bates Monoplane
- 1911 Battaille Triplane
- 1911 Beaver Monoplane
- 1911 Bellanca Monoplane
- 1911 Benoist Headless pusher biplane
- 1911 Besson Canard monoplane
- 1911 Billing Tractor biplane
- 1911 Blackburn Mercury
- 1911 Blackburn Tractor monoplane
- 1911 Bland Mayfly Biplane
- 1911 Blaney Monoplane
- 1911 Blériot XV
- 1911 Blériot XX Le Poisson monoplane
- 1911 Blériot XXI side by side seater monoplane
- 1911 Blériot XXIII monoplane
- 1911 Blériot XXIV
- 1911 Blériot XXV Canard
- 1911 Blériot XXVII monoplane
- 1911 Blériot XXVIII Populaire monoplane
- 1911 Bloudek-Cermak Libella monoplane
- 1911 Bloudek-Cermak Libella II biplane
- 1911 Bohatyrew Canard monoplane
- 1911 Bokor III triplane
- 1911 Boland tailless pusher biplane
- 1911 Bonnet-Labranche Racer monoplane
- 1911 Borel Militaire monoplane 4 seat
- 1911 Borucki No.2 pusher biplane
- 1911 Breguet U-2 3 seat biplane
- 1911 Bristol-Challenger-Low Monoplane
- 1911 Bristol Prier monoplane
- 1911 Bristol Racing biplane
- 1911 Bristol T (also known as Bristol-Challenger-England Biplane or Bristol-Challenger-Dickson Biplane)
- 1911 Bronislawski I 2 seater biplane
- 1911 Brown Biplane
- 1911 Brumarescu Columba Biplane 2 seat
- 1911 Bulot Tractor biplane
- 1911 Burgess E Baby biplane
- 1911 Burgess-Wright F biplane
- 1911 Caledonia Monoplane
- 1911 Capon Monoplane
- 1911 Caproni Ca.4 (1911) biplane
- 1911 Caproni Ca.5 (1911) biplane
- 1911 Caproni Ca.6 biplane
- 1911 Caproni Ca.8 monoplane
- 1911 Caproni Ca.9 monoplane
- 1911 Carlier Biplane
- 1911 Carter Biplane
- 1911 Castaibert II monoplane
- 1911 Cato Pusher biplane
- 1911 Caudron Type N monoplane
- 1911 Caudron-Fabre Hydrobiplane
- 1911 Cayre Monoplane
- 1911 Ceita Monoplane
- 1911 Cessna Monoplane
- 1911 Champel Biplane
- 1911 Chase-Gouverneur Wrightsville beach multiplane
- 1911 Chazal Monoplane
- 1911 Chechet Ushkov Rebikov ChUR-1 biplane
- 1911 Chedeville No.2 monoplane
- 1911 Cihak D
- 1911 Clement Louis Steel tube biplane
- 1911 Clement-Bayard Monoplane
- 1911 Coanda Biplane
- 1911 Coanda Monoplane
- 1911 Cody III biplane
- 1911 Copin Tractor monoplane
- 1911 Crocco and Ricaldoni P3 airship
- 1911 Curtiss A-1 Triad pusher amphibian
- 1911 Curtiss Amphibian triplane
- 1911 Curtiss Canoe biplane
- 1911 Curtiss D Headless amphibian
- 1911 Curtiss E hydroplane
- 1911 Dajoigny et Beaussart Minimum monoplane
- 1911 De Brageas Monoplane
- 1911 De Brouckere Biplane
- 1911 De La Hault Biplane
- 1911 De Marcay-Moonen Folding wing monoplane
- 1911 De Nissole Monoplane
- 1911 Dechenne Biplane
- 1911 Demkin Biplane (Georgiy Konstantinovich Demkin, Георгий Константинович Демкин)
- 1911 Denhaut Flying boat biplane
- 1911 Deperdussin Type B monoplane
- 1911 Deperdussin Militaire monoplane
- 1911 Deperdussin Grenoble monoplane
- 1911 Deperdussin Type C monoplane
- 1911 DFW Doppeldecker
- 1911 Dinoird Monoplane
- 1911 Dixon Nipper No.1 monoplane
- 1911 Donnet-Leveque A
- 1911 Dorner Eindecker
- 1911 Du Breuil Monoplane No.1
- 1911 Du Breuil Monoplane No.2
- 1911 Du Breuil Monoplane No.3
- 1911 Dufaux 5 doppeldecker
- 1911 Dufaux Floatplane
- 1911 Dunne D.6 monoplane
- 1911 Dunne D.7 all wing auto safety monoplane
- 1911 Dux Yastreb airship
- 1911 Edwards Rhomboidal
- 1911 Emblem Biplane
- 1911 Eparvier Monoplane
- 1911 Ery Monoplane
- 1911 Escher Monoplane
- 1911 Esnault-Pelterie REP Biplane
- 1911 Esnault-Pelterie REP De Course monoplane
- 1911 Esnault-Pelterie REP F monoplane
- 1911 Etrich Etrichapparat eindecker
- 1911 Etrich IV Manövertaube Type B military 2-seater monoplane
- 1911 Etrich VII Renntaube 3 seater racing monoplane
- 1911 Euler Eindecker
- 1911 Euler Military pusher doppeldecker
- 1911 Euler Schuldreidecker training pusher triplane
- 1911 Farman Monoplane 2 seat
- 1911 Farman HF.VI Militaire 2 seat pusher biplane
- 1911 Farman HF.VII
- 1911 Farman HF.X 3 seater pusher biplane
- 1911 Farman HF.Xbis 3 seater pusher biplane
- 1911 Farman MF.II staggered biplane (Maurice Farman)
- 1911 Fisk Monoplane
- 1911 Fitch Biplane
- 1911 Fitzsimmons Pusher monoplane
- 1911 Flanders F.2 monoplane
- 1911 Flanders F.3 2 seater monoplane
- 1911 Fokker M1 2 seat monoplane
- 1911 Fokker Spinn tractor monoplane
- 1911 Fokker Spinn 2 monoplane
- 1911 Francis Biplane twin engined
- 1911 Fritz Monoplane
- 1911 Fumat Monoplane
- 1911 Gabardini Le Monaco monoplane
- 1911 Gakkel IV biplane
- 1911 Gakkel V
- 1911 Gakkel VI biplane
- 1911 Gakkel VII biplane
- 1911 Garuda Moewe Eindecker (Seagull)
- 1911 Gassier Sylphe Monoplane
- 1911 Gaudard Monoplane rigid trussed beam
- 1911 Gaunt Biplane No.2 Baby
- 1911 Gibson Multiplane
- 1911 Glowinski monoplane
- 1911 Goldschmidt Monoplane
- 1911 Goupy No.2
- 1911 Goupy No.3
- 1911 Grahame-White Baby biplane
- 1911 Grahame-White School Biplane
- 1911 Grapperon Monoplane
- 1911 Gray Monoplane
- 1911 Guyard Monoplane
- 1911 Guyot et Verdier Biplane
- 1911 Haefelin Eindecker
- 1911 Hamel Biplane
- 1911 Hammond Triplane
- 1911 Handley Page D monoplane
- 1911 Hanriot Monoplane VI
- 1911 Harel Biplane
- 1911 Harlan Eindecker
- 1911 Hawkins-Ogilvie Triplane
- 1911 Hayot Monoplane
- 1911 Henkel Biplane
- 1911 Hiller Hydroplane
- 1911 Hiller Monoplane
- 1911 Hino 2 monoplane
- 1911 HMA No.1 Mayfly airship
- 1911 Horvath II monoplane
- 1911 Horvath IIIA monoplane
- 1911 Humber Biplane
- 1911 Humphrey No.3 monoplane
- 1911 Jatho Stahltaube
- 1911 Jero N° 9 Antwerpen
- 1911 Jezzi No.2 sesquiplane
- 1911 Johnson Monoplane
- 1911 Kaishiki No.1 biplane
- 1911 Karpeka 1bis
- 1911 Kassa Ery 1 biplane
- 1911 Kassa Ery 2 monoplane
- 1911 Kaufmann No.3 monoplane
- 1911 Kaufmann No.4 De Course monoplane
- 1911 Kiraly-Berkovics Monoplane
- 1911 Kolbany II monoplane
- 1911 Kolbany III monoplane
- 1911 Koolhoven F.K.1 Heidevogel biplane
- 1911 Kordin Monoplane
- 1911 Kudashev 4 monoplane
- 1911 Kvasz II monoplane
- 1911 Lakes Water Bird seaplane
- 1911 Lasternas Biplane
- 1911 Lebaudy No.8 airship
- 1911 Lebaudy No.9 capitaine Marchal airship
- 1911 Lebaudy No.10 airship
- 1911 Lebedev PTA-1 folding wing biplane
- 1911 Lecoq-Monteiro-Aillaud Monoplane
- 1911 Lefebvre Concours Militaire monoplane
- 1911 Lefebvre La Mouette monoplane (Gull)
- 1911 Leforestier Monoplane
- 1911 Lennert Biplane
- 1911 Libanski Jaskolka biplane
- 1911 Liore et Olivier Monoplane
- 1911 Lobanov L-1
- 1911 Loening Flying boat
- 1911 Lohner-Etrich Taube A military monoplane
- 1911 Long Monoplane
- 1911 Longren Biplane
- 1911 Loose Pusher biplane
- 1911 Loubery Biplane
- 1911 Macfie Circuit biplane
- 1911 Mamet Monoplane 2 seater
- 1911 Mannsbarth-Stagl Airship
- 1911 Marinescu Bomber
- 1911 Martin Pusher biplane
- 1911 Martin-Handasyde No.4B
- 1911 Martin-Handasyde No.5
- 1911 Martinaisse Pusher monoplane
- 1911 Maurin et Willaume Monoplane
- 1911 McCormick-James Master plaster monoplane
- 1911 McCormick-Romme Umbrellaplane
- 1911 McCormick-Romme Cycloplane
- 1911 McCurdy Headless pusher biplane
- 1911 Mercep Monoplane
- 1911 Mersey monoplane
- 1911 Merx Himmelsleiter funfdecker
- 1911 Moisant Monoplane
- 1911 Molon Monoplane
- 1911 Monnier-Harper Monoplane
- 1911 Montgomery Evergreen monoplane glider
- 1911 Morane-Borel Militaire monoplane 2 seater
- 1911 Morane-Borel monoplane
- 1911 Morane-Saulnier A Ecole 1 seater monoplane
- 1911 Morane-Saulnier B tandem 2 seater monoplane
- 1911 Morane-Saulnier C 1 seater monoplane
- 1911 Morane-Saulnier HS Ecole 2 seater monoplane
- 1911 Morane-Saulnier PP 1 seater monoplane
- 1911 Morane-Saulnier Rebikoff 3 seater monoplane
- 1911 Morane-Saulnier TB 2 seater armoured military monoplane
- 1911 Morita Monoplane
- 1911 Narahara No.2 biplane
- 1911 Narahara No.3 biplane
- 1911 Nieuport IV monoplane
- 1911 Nieuport IVM Militaire monoplane
- 1911 Noel Le Moineau biplane
- 1911 North Biplane glider
- 1911 Nottingham Monoplane
- 1911 Nyrop Monoplane
- 1911 Obre No.4 monoplane
- 1911 Oertz Eindecker
- 1911 Paterson No.2 biplane
- 1911 Paulhan biplane
- 1911 Paulhan triplane l
- 1911 Paulhan-Tatin Aéro-Torpille
- 1911 Pelliat Monoplane
- 1911 Pepper Biplane
- 1911 Percival 1 biplane
- 1911 Pietschker Taube (Alfred Pietschker)
- 1911 Piffard No.2 biplane
- 1911 Piggott Monoplane
- 1911 Pischoff Autoplans monoplane
- 1911 Pivot-Koechlin monoplane
- 1911 Plage-Court Torpedo I monoplane
- 1911 Planes Monoplane
- 1911 Pochin Biplane
- 1911 Poix et Deroig Monoplane
- 1911 Ponnier F1 biplane
- 1911 Ponnier F1bis biplane
- 1911 Poulain Orange No.2 monoplane
- 1911 Porokhovschikov 1 monoplane
- 1911 Prier monoplane
- 1911 Proudhon Monoplane
- 1911 Queen Monoplane
- 1911 Queen-Martin Biplane
- 1911 R.A.A. Kretchet airship
- 1911 Radley & Moorhouse Monoplane
- 1911 Radley Gull wing monoplane
- 1911 Rodjestveisky Triplane
- 1911 Roe IV triplane
- 1911 Roe Duigan
- 1911 Roe D
- 1911 Royal Aircraft Factory B.E.1
- 1911 Royal Aircraft Factory B.E.2
- 1911 Royal Aircraft Factory F.E.1
- 1911 Royal Aircraft Factory F.E.2
- 1911 Royal Aircraft Factory S.E.1
- 1911 Ragot Monoplane (Henri Ragot and Louis Ragot, Adrien Lacroix, New York NY)
- 1911 Raison Monoplane
- 1911 Rebikoff Biplane
- 1911 Restan Monoplane
- 1911 Roux Monoplane 2 seater
- 1911 Ruchonnet Le Cigare monoplane
- 1911 Ruchonnet-Schemmel Monoplane
- 1911 Ruehl Monoplane
- 1911 Sablatnig Baby (first aircraft of Carinthian Josef Sablatnig)
- 1911 SAC Caledonia monoplane
- 1911 Salvador Monoplane
- 1911 Sanders No.2 biplane I
- 1911 Sanders No.2 biplane II
- 1911 Sarri Monoplane
- 1911 Saru-Ionescu Monoplane 1 seater
- 1911 Sato & Davis Biplane
- 1911 Savary Biplane 2 props
- 1911 Schmitt Biplane
- 1911 Schreck Diapason I
- 1911 Schudeisky Eindecker
- 1911 Schutte Lanz S.L.1 airship
- 1911 Sexton Monoplane
- 1911 Short S.39 triple twin
- 1911 Short Tandem-Twin
- 1911 Siemens-Schuckert Airship I
- 1911 Siemens-Schuckert Eindecker
- 1911 Sikorsky S-5 and S-5A biplane
- 1911 Sikorsky S-6 biplane
- 1911 Sirius Monoplane
- 1911 Skinner Monoplane
- 1911 Sloan Concours militaire biplane
- 1911 Sloan Twin tractor bicurve biplane
- 1911 Smith Monoplane
- 1911 Sommer Aerobus Grand pusher biplane
- 1911 Sommer De Campagne biplane
- 1911 Sommer De Course tractor biplane
- 1911 Sommer Rapide L biplane
- 1911 Spainhour Monoplane
- 1911 Sperry Tractor biplane
- 1911 Star monoplane
- 1911 Steco Hydraplane biplane
- 1911 Steffen Taube
- 1911 Steglau No.1 biplane
- 1911 Stewart Biplane
- 1911 Suchard Airship
- 1911 SVA Minimum monoplane
- 1911 Svachulay Albatrosz II
- 1911 Svachulay Hummingbird II
- 1911 Szarics II monoplane
- 1911 Szekely II Canard pusher monoplane
- 1911 Taddeoli Eindecker
- 1911 Takacs I monoplane
- 1911 Tellier Monoplane
- 1911 Teodorescu Monoplane
- 1911 Thomann Monoplane
- 1911 Thomas Headless biplane
- 1911 Toth II monoplane
- 1911 Tonini Monorebus (Alessandro Tonini)
- 1911 Train No.2 1 and 2 seat monoplane
- 1911 Tsuzuku No.1 pusher monoplane
- 1911 Tucek II 1 seater monoplane
- 1911 Universal Aviation Company Birdling monoplane
- 1911 Van Den Burg Monoplane
- 1911 Vass Monoplane
- 1911 Vedo Vili
- 1911 Vendome Elliptical wing monoplane
- 1911 Vendome Gull wing monoplane
- 1911 Vickers No.1 monoplane
- 1911 Vickers No.2-V monoplane
- 1911 Vinet B monoplane
- 1911 Vinet D monoplane
- 1911 Vlach III monoplane
- 1911 Vlaicu II
- 1911 Vogel Monoplane (bird)
- 1911 Voisin 17 metres canard
- 1911 Voisin-Bristol Monoplane
- 1911 Voisin Canard
- 1911 Walden Monoplane
- 1911 Walsh Biplane
- 1911 Walton-Edwards Colossoplane biplane
- 1911 Warchalowski IV 1 seater pusher biplane
- 1911 Warchalowski V 1 seater pusher biplane
- 1911 Warchalowski VI 1 seater tractor biplane
- 1911 Warchalowski VII and VIIbis 1 seater pusher biplane
- 1911 Warchalowski VIII 1 seater pusher biplane
- 1911 Warchalowski IX pusher biplane
- 1911 Warchalowski X biplane
- 1911 Watson No.2 biplane
- 1911 Weiss No.2 Sylvia tractor monoplane
- 1911 Wiencziers Renneindecker (first retractable undercarriage Eugen Wiencziers)
- 1911 Wildeblood Triplane
- 1911 Willing Monoplane
- 1911 Wilson-Gibson Monoplane
- 1911 Wiseman-Noonen Biplane
- 1911 Wisniewski Monoplane
- 1911 Wright Model EX
- 1911 Yamada Kai-Shiki I-Go airship
- 1911 Yamada No.2 airship
- 1911 Yamada No.3 airship
- 1911 Young-Hearne Biplane
- 1911 Zbieranski and Cywinski Biplane
- 1911 Zens High wing monoplane
- 1911 Zeppelin LZ-8 Deutschland II airship
- 1911 Zeppelin LZ-10 Schwaben airship
- 1911 Zodiac No.3 biplane pusher
- 1911 Zodiac No.4 biplane 2 seater tractor
- 1911 Zodiac No.10 airship
- 1911 Zodiac No.11 capitaine Ferber airship
- 1911 Zurovec Doppeldecker

== 1912 ==
- 1912 ABF Delta airship (also known as British Army Airship Delta)
- 1912 Abramovich Biplane
- 1912 AEG Z3 doppeldecker
- 1912 Aerial Wheel Syndicate Monoplane
- 1912 Albatros DD1 Pfeil doppeldecker
- 1912 Albatros Doppeltaube
- 1912 Albatros F2 doppeldecker
- 1912 Albatros WM2 doppeldecker
- 1912 Albessard Aerobus
- 1912 Amiot 1
- 1912 Antoni Monoplane
- 1912 Arnoux Flying wing
- 1912 Arsenal Seaplane
- 1912 Artois Aerotorpille biplane
- 1912 ASL Viking
- 1912 Astra Hydrobiplane
- 1912 Astra Triplane
- 1912 Astra CM biplane
- 1912 Auto-Fiacre
- 1912 Aviatik AK1 doppeldecker
- 1912 Aviatik Taube
- 1912 Avro 500
- 1912 Avro F with enclosed flight deck
- 1912 Avro G with enclosed flight deck
- 1912 BCD No.1 El Cangrejo biplane
- 1912 Barillon No.4 monoplane
- 1912 Bates Monoplane
- 1912 Beech National biplane
- 1912 Behueghe Monoplane
- 1912 Benoist Biplane flying boat
- 1912 Benoist XII 2 seater tractor biplane
- 1912 Benton II tractor biplane
- 1912 Berthaud Monoplane
- 1912 Bertin No.5 2 seater monoplane
- 1912 Blackburn III tractor monoplane
- 1912 Blackburn Tractor monoplane 1 seater
- 1912 Blackburn E military tractor monoplane
- 1912 Blériot XXXIII Canard Bleu
- 1912 Blériot XXXVI Torpille monoplane
- 1912 Blériot XXXVIbis
- 1912 Blinderman-Gilbert Monoplane
- 1912 Boemcher I airship
- 1912 Boemcher II airship
- 1912 Boland tailless pusher biplane
- 1912 Bomhard Pfeil doppeldecker
- 1912 Borel Hydromonoplane 2 seater
- 1912 Borel Monoplane
- 1912 Borel O BUS monoplane
- 1912 Botyanszky MB-1
- 1912 Breguet U tractor biplane, U-2 hydravion and Militaire tractor biplane
- 1912 Bristol Coanda Monoplane
- 1912 Bristol G.E.2 biplane
- 1912 Bristol G.E.3 2 seater biplane
- 1912 Bronislawski II 2 seater biplane
- 1912 Brule Biplane
- 1912 Burgess H military tractor biplane
- 1912 Burgess-Gill Twin hydro biplane
- 1912 Burgess-Wright Military biplane
- 1912 Burney X.2 seaplane
- 1912 Calderara Seaplane
- 1912 Call II monoplane
- 1912 Camo y Acedo Biplane
- 1912 Caproni Ca.13 monoplane
- 1912 Caproni Ca.16 monoplane
- 1912 Caproni Ca.18 monoplane
- 1912 Castaibert III monoplane
- 1912 Cato Pusher biplane
- 1912 Caudron C and D
- 1912 Caudron M monoplane
- 1912 Caudron Monaco pusher seaplane
- 1912 Caudron Special
- 1912 Cayol Monoplane
- 1912 Cessna Silver wings monoplane
- 1912 Champel No.4 pusher biplane
- 1912 Chanter Monoplane
- 1912 Cheramy-Gilbert Amphibian canard monoplane
- 1912 Chiribiri No.5 2 seater tractor monoplane
- 1912 Christofferson Curtiss Headless pusher biplane
- 1912 Christofferson Trainer biplane
- 1912 Church and Sherwood Biplane
- 1912 Cihak E
- 1912 Cihak F
- 1912 Cihak G 2 seater monoplane
- 1912 Cihak H 1 seater monoplane
- 1912 Cihak J 2 seater monoplane
- 1912 Cihak Rapid A 1 seater monoplane
- 1912 Cihak Rapid C 1 seater monoplane
- 1912 Cirulis
- 1912 Clement-Bayard Biplane
- 1912 Clement-Bayard Monoplane
- 1912 Coventry 10 biplane
- 1912 CPC Monoplane 2 seater
- 1912 Crocco and Ricaldoni M1 airship
- 1912 Crocco and Ricaldoni M2 airship
- 1912 Crocco and Ricaldoni P4 airship
- 1912 Crocco and Ricaldoni P5 airship
- 1912 Clement-Bayard No.3 airship
- 1912 Clement-Bayard No.4 Adjudant Vincenot airship
- 1912 Cockburn Biplane
- 1912 Cody IV monoplane
- 1912 Cody V biplane
- 1912 Cooke Flying boat biplane
- 1912 Cooke No.1 pusher biplane
- 1912 Copin Monoplane
- 1912 Cordner Monoplane No.2
- 1912 COW No.10 biplane
- 1912 COW No.11 biplane
- 1912 Crocco and Ricaldoni Hydroplane
- 1912 Csok Monoplane
- 1912 Curtiss A-2 pusher biplane
- 1912 Curtiss E flying boat
- 1912 Curtiss OWL pusher biplane flying boat
- 1912 Dajoigny et Beaussart 3rd monoplane
- 1912 Danard et Nayout Pusher biplane
- 1912 Darmstadt Gleiter
- 1912 Day Tractor biplane
- 1912 De Beer 3 monoplane
- 1912 De Beer 4 monoplane
- 1912 De Brouckere Biplane
- 1912 Decazes Helicoplane
- 1912 De Marcay-Moonen L'Abeille monoplane (Bee)
- 1912 De Marcay-Moonen Monoplane
- 1912 Debongnie Monoplane
- 1912 Demazel Biplane
- 1912 Deperdussin L'Espervier F monoplane
- 1912 Deperdussin Monocoque and Grand Prix d'Anjou monoplane
- 1912 Deperdussin Racing monoplane
- 1912 Deperdussin Tamise amphibian monoplane
- 1912 DFW Mars Pfeil 2 seater eindecker and doppeldecker
- 1912 Diakov Monoplane
- 1912 Dokuchaev 2 biplane
- 1912 Donnet-Leveque B
- 1912 Donnet-Leveque C
- 1912 Dorand Laboratoire biplane
- 1912 Dornier Doppeldecker 2 seater
- 1912 Doutre Biplane
- 1912 Drzewiecki Canard monoplane (also known as Dzhevetsky)
- 1912 Duflou and Konstantinovich Kobchik airship
- 1912 Dunne D.7bis all wing monoplane
- 1912 Dux 1 biplane
- 1912 Dux Meller 1 pusher monoplane
- 1912 Ecker Flying boat
- 1912 EFW Etrich XII Rennapparat 2-seater bomber monoplane
- 1912 Ellehammer helicopter
- 1912 Epps 1912 Monoplane
- 1912 Erdody Biplane
- 1912 Erdody Monoplane
- 1912 Esnault-Pelterie REP K hydromonoplane
- 1912 Etrich IX Schwalbe eindecker
- 1912 Etrich Manövertaube Type F 2-seater military monoplane
- 1912 Etrich Luft-Limousine
- 1912 Euler Amphibian pusher dreidecker
- 1912 Euler Eindecker (not a Taube)
- 1912 Euler Gelber Hund pusher doppeldecker 2 seater
- 1912 Euler Taube
- 1912 Faccioli No.6 monoplane
- 1912 Farman Amphibian pusher biplane
- 1912 Farman HF.XI big 2 seater seaplane
- 1912 Farman HF.XIV 4 and 5 seater pusher biplane
- 1912 Farman HF.XV 2 seater pusher biplane
- 1912 Farman HF.XVI single bay sesquiplane
- 1912 Farmann Le Babillard biplane
- 1912 FBA 26 biplane flying boat
- 1912 Feng Ru No.2 biplane (Fung Joe Guey, Fung Guey, Fung Yuen, Fong Yu, Fung Yu etc.)
- 1912 Flanders B.2
- 1912 Flanders F.4
- 1912 Fokker IIIB monoplane
- 1912 Fokker M2 monoplane
- 1912 Fokker M3 2 seater monoplane
- 1912 Fokker M4 2 seater trainer monoplane
- 1912 Fowler-Gage Tractor biplane
- 1912 Frassinetti La Colomba monoplane
- 1912 Friedrichshafen FF1
- 1912 Gabardini Flying boat
- 1912 Gage Biplane
- 1912 Gage-Fowler Biplane
- 1912 Gakkel VIII biplane
- 1912 Gakkel IX monoplane
- 1912 Gandy-Vrang Monoplane 2 seater
- 1912 Garaix Monoplane 2 seater metal construction
- 1912 Garbero-Becue Monoplane
- 1912 Garnier Biplane
- 1912 Gallaudet A-1 Bullet pusher monoplane
- 1912 Gavault Monoplane
- 1912 Gayot Monoplane
- 1912 Gerard et Salkin Gesa hydromonoplane
- 1912 Gilbert Canard monoplane
- 1912 Ginnochio Flying boat
- 1912 Gluck Taube
- 1912 Gnosspelius No.2 hydromonoplane
- 1912 Goedecker Sturmvogel eindecker
- 1912 Goodden Dragonfly monoplane
- 1912 Gourvene Biplane
- 1912 Grade Seaplane
- 1912 Grandjean Hydravion monoplane
- 1912 Grizodubov 4 monoplane
- 1912 Groth II monoplane
- 1912 Hammer & Krollmann Eindecker
- 1912 Handley Page E 2 seater monoplane
- 1912 Handley Page F 2 seater monoplane
- 1912 Hanriot Monoplane
- 1912 Hanuschke Eindecker
- 1912 Harlan Doppeldecker
- 1912 Harlan Eindecker
- 1912 Harriman Biplane
- 1912 Hirondelle Monoplane
- 1912 Horvath Military monoplane 2 seater
- 1912 Horvath IIIB monoplane
- 1912 Horvath IIIC Fecske monoplane
- 1912 Hubner Eindecker
- 1912 IAC X 2 place tractor biplane
- 1912 Jatho Eindecker
- 1912 Jeannin Eindecker
- 1912 Jeannin Stahltaube
- 1912 Jezzi No.2 biplane
- 1912 Jones Monoplane (L. J. R. (Leslie) Jones)
- 1912 Kaishiki No.2 pusher biplane
- 1912 Kalep Biplane 2 engines
- 1912 Kalep Monoplane
- 1912 Karpeka 2 biplane
- 1912 Kassa Ery 3 monoplane
- 1912 Khioni Monoplane
- 1912 Kirkham Racer biplane
- 1912 Kolbanyi IV
- 1912 Kolbanyi V monoplane
- 1912 Kuhlstein Eindecker
- 1912 Kvasz III monoplane
- 1912 Kvasz IV monoplane
- 1912 Kvasz-Torsz Godron biplane
- 1912 Ladougne La Colombo No.1 monoplane
- 1912 Ladougne La Colombo No.2 monoplane
- 1912 Lakes Water Hen
- 1912 Lakes Sea Bird seaplane
- 1912 Lanyi Biplane
- 1912 Lavesvre et Veillon monoplane 2 seater
- 1912 Leblic Biplane
- 1912 Leclerc Monoplane
- 1912 Lecomte Monoplane
- 1912 Lecoq-Monteiro-Aillaud Monoplane
- 1912 Leforestier Monoplane
- 1912 Lemaitre-Maucourt-Legrand Monoplane
- 1912 Lerke Yankovsky Mosca LYaM 1 seater monoplane
- 1912 Letai II biplane
- 1912 Letai III biplane
- 1912 Letai IV monoplane
- 1912 Leyat Biplane
- 1912 Lohner B.I doppeldecker
- 1912 Lohner Pfeilflieger II doppeldecker
- 1912 Lohner Pfeilflieger Sport type Hold
- 1912 LVG B.I doppeldecker
- 1912 LVG Doppeldecker
- 1912 Marshall Biplane
- 1912 Martin Pusher biplane 2 seater
- 1912 Martin-Handasyde Military trial
- 1912 Meckler-Allen New York hydrobiplane
- 1912 Mercader y Bernal Biplane
- 1912 Mercep Monoplane
- 1912 Montgolfier Monoplane
- 1912 Morane-Saulnier Monoplane
- 1912 Morane-Saulnier Type Canton 3 seater monoplane
- 1912 Morane-Saulnier Type E monoplane
- 1912 Morane-Saulnier Type G and Type G Parasol monoplane
- 1912 Morane-Saulnier Type Garros 1 seater monoplane
- 1912 Morane-Saulnier Type H 1 seater monoplane
- 1912 Morane-Saulnier Type J 2 seater touring monoplane
- 1912 Morane-Saulnier Type K racing hydromonoplane
- 1912 Morane-Saulnier Type M armoured
- 1912 Morane-Saulnier Type Renault 2 seater monoplane
- 1912 Morane-Saulnier Type WR 2 seater armoured monoplane
- 1912 Moreau Military aerostable monoplane
- 1912 Mountaineer Pusher biplane
- 1912 Mrozinski Eindecker
- 1912 Narahara Otori biplane
- 1912 NFW E5 eindecker
- 1912 Nieuport IV G hydromonoplane
- 1912 Oertz Eindecker
- 1912 Otto Renndoppeldecker racer
- 1912 Palmgren Monoplane (David A. Palmgren)
- 1912 Passat Seagull monoplane
- 1912 Paterson Twin tractor biplane
- 1912 Paulat Monoplane
- 1912 Paumier No.2 biplane
- 1912 Peck Columbia biplane
- 1912 Pippart-Noll PN1 eindecker
- 1912 Pippart-Noll PN2 eindecker
- 1912 Plage-Court Torpedo II monoplane
- 1912 Ponche-Primaud Tubavion
- 1912 Ponnier D.I monoplane
- 1912 Pons Pusher canard monoplane
- 1912 Poulain Orange No.3 monoplane
- 1912 Prodam I monoplane
- 1912 Prodam II 2 seater monoplane
- 1912 Queen Aeroboat flying boat monoplane
- 1912 Reichelt Eindecker 2 seater
- 1912 Reissner Canard monoplane
- 1912 Reiter No.1 monoplane
- 1912 Reiter No.2 monoplane
- 1912 Rex Monoplane
- 1912 Rimailho Biplane
- 1912 Roe-Burga monoplane
- 1912 Roe E
- 1912 Roe F
- 1912 Roe G
- 1912 Roux-Garaix Monoplane
- 1912 Rover Eindecker
- 1912 Royal Aircraft Factory B.E.3
- 1912 Royal Aircraft Factory B.E.4
- 1912 Royal Aircraft Factory B.E.5
- 1912 Royal Aircraft Factory B.E.6
- 1912 Rowell Monoplane
- 1912 Rumpler Taube
- 1912 Ruth Rohde Doppeldecker I
- 1912 Ruth Rohde Doppeldecker II
- 1912 SAC Dart monoplane
- 1912 Saigai Monoplane
- 1912 Saint George Helicopter
- 1912 Salvez Monoplane
- 1912 Sanchez-Besa Biplane
- 1912 Sanchez-Besa Seaplane
- 1912 Savary Biplane
- 1912 Savary Floatplane
- 1912 Savary Military biplane
- 1912 Schlegel Monoplane
- 1912 Schreck Diapason II
- 1912 Schulze Eindecker I
- 1912 Schulze Eindecker II
- 1912 Schulze Eindecker III
- 1912 Shigeno Biplane
- 1912 Shiukov Canard 1 monoplane
- 1912 Short S.33 dual control floatplane
- 1912 Short S.36 tractor biplane
- 1912 Short S.41 amphibian tractor biplane
- 1912 Short S.42 tractor monoplane
- 1912 Short S.45 tractor biplane
- 1912 Short S.47 Field kitchen triple tractor biplane
- 1912 Short S.80 Nile floatplane
- 1912 Short S.38 pusher biplane
- 1912 Sigismund Eindecker
- 1912 Sikorsky S-6A biplane
- 1912 Sikorsky S-6B biplane
- 1912 Sikorsky S-7 monoplane
- 1912 Sikorsky S-8 Malyutka biplane
- 1912 Sloan Biplane
- 1912 Smith Monoplane
- 1912 Smith Multiplane
- 1912 Sommer Floatbiplane
- 1912 Sommer E monoplane
- 1912 Sommer K pusher biplane
- 1912 Sommer Monoplane
- 1912 Sommer R biplane
- 1912 Sommer Reliable biplane
- 1912 Sonoda Biplane
- 1912 Sopwith 3-Seater tractor biplane
- 1912 Sopwith-Wright Twin pusher biplane
- 1912 Sparling Biplane
- 1912 Spencer biplane
- 1912 Steglau No.2 biplane
- 1912 Suranyi I monoplane
- 1912 SVA 3 monoplane
- 1912 Svachulay Albatrosz III
- 1912 Svachulay Hummingbird III
- 1912 Szekely III Az Ujsag monoplane
- 1912 Taddeoli-Perrot Mouette canard floatplane
- 1912 Takacs II monoplane
- 1912 Takacs III monoplane
- 1912 Takacs IV monoplane
- 1912 Tereschenko Zembinsky Monoplane
- 1912 Thomas B-4 pusher flying boat
- 1912 Thomas Pusher monoplane
- 1912 Thomas-Morse TA tractor flying boat
- 1912 Toth III monoplane
- 1912 Train No.3 monoplane
- 1912 Tsuzuki Monoplane No.2
- 1912 Vendome Militaire monoplane
- 1912 Vickers No.6 monoplane
- 1912 Villard Helicopter
- 1912 Vinet F 2 seater monoplane
- 1912 Vlach Monoplane
- 1912 Voisin Icare Aero-Yacht
- 1912 Voisin Monaco canard
- 1912 Von Preussen Monoplane
- 1912 Wakadori Biplane
- 1912 Warchalowski XI 2 seat floatplane
- 1912 Washington Columbia monoplane
- 1912 Wetterwald Eindecker
- 1912 Williams Biplane
- 1912 Williams Monoplane
- 1912 Willows No.4 airship
- 1912 Wittber Biplane
- 1912 Wright Model C
- 1912 Wright Model D
- 1912 Yuriev Helicopter
- 1912 Zens No.3 monoplane
- 1912 Zeppelin LZ-11 airship
- 1912 Zeppelin LZ-12 Z-III airship
- 1912 Zeppelin LZ-13 Hansa airship
- 1912 Zeppelin LZ-14 L-1 airship
- 1912 Ziegler Eindecker (Ziegler Pfeil eindecker? Albert Ziegler)
- 1912 Zsemlye Monoplane
- 1912 Zurovec Eindecker 1 seat

== 1913 ==
- 1913 ABF Epsilon airship (also known as British Army Airship Epsilon)
- 1913 AEG B.I doppeldecker
- 1913 Ago E.I eindecker
- 1913 Ago Seaplane
- 1913 Albatros B.I doppeldecker
- 1913 Albatros DD2 Pfeil doppeldecker
- 1913 Albatros DE doppeldecker
- 1913 Albatros DL1 doppeldecker
- 1913 Albatros EE eindecker
- 1913 Albatros K351 doppeldecker
- 1913 Albatros RE1 eindecker
- 1913 Albatros Taube
- 1913 Albatros WDD floatplane
- 1913 Alfaro I
- 1913 Andreansky
- 1913 Antoni Monoplane
- 1913 Arnoux Flying wing
- 1913 Artois Flying boat
- 1913 Astra-Torres AT-13 airship
- 1913 Atwood Floatbiplane
- 1913 Autostable Monoplane
- 1913 Aviatik C.I doppeldecker
- 1913 Aviatik P14 doppeldecker
- 1913 Avro 501
- 1913 Avro 503
- 1913 Avro 504
- 1913 Bachelier-Dupont-Baudrin Biplane flying boat
- 1913 Badaire Monoplane
- 1913 Balassian de Manawas Monoplane
- 1913 Baltic Kovanko airship
- 1913 Bathiat-Sanchez E monoplane
- 1913 Bathiat-Sanchez Floatplane
- 1913 Bathiat-Sanchez Pusher biplane
- 1913 Batson Dragonfly six wing flying boat
- 1913 Baumbach Eindecker
- 1913 BCD No.2 monoplane
- 1913 Benoist Type XIV 2 seater pusher biplane flying boat
- 1913 Berger Monoplane
- 1913 Blackburn Tractor monoplane 2 seater
- 1913 Blanc Monoplane
- 1913 Blériot XL tandem seater pusher biplane
- 1913 Blériot XLII pusher canard
- 1913 Blériot XLIII tandem armored monoplane
- 1913 Blériot XLIV Artillaire monoplane
- 1913 Blériot XLV monoplane
- 1913 Blériot XXXIX armoured monoplane
- 1913 Bloudek-Cermak Bohemia B I 1 seater monoplane
- 1913 Bloudek-Cermak Bohemia B II 1 seater monoplane
- 1913 Boland Biplane
- 1913 Boland Triplane
- 1913 Borel Aeroyacht Denhaut I
- 1913 Borel Aeroyacht Denhaut II
- 1913 Borel Aeroyacht Denhaut III
- 1913 Borel hydro-monoplane 2 seater
- 1913 Borel Monoplane
- 1913 Borel Ruby pusher monoplane
- 1913 Borel Torpille monoplane
- 1913 Borel Militaire monoplane
- 1913 Borel Monaco flying boat
- 1913 Botyanksy MB-2
- 1913 Breguet G-4 amphibian
- 1913 Breguet H-U3 hydravion
- 1913 Breguet La Marseillaise monoplane flying boat
- 1913 Bristol Coanda BR.7 biplane
- 1913 Bristol Coanda BR.8 biplane
- 1913 Bristol Coanda Hydrobiplane
- 1913 Bristol Halberstadt Taube
- 1913 Bristol Scout
- 1913 Bristol TB.8 biplane
- 1913 Bruneau-Parant Monoplane
- 1913 Burgess I Scout hydroaeroplane
- 1913 Burgess K biplane flying boat
- 1913 Burgess-Collier Biplane flying boat
- 1913 Burgess-Dunne Aerohydroplane
- 1913 Burgess-Wright Hydrobiplane flying boat
- 1913 Burney X.3 seaplane
- 1913 Caproni Ca.20 monoplane
- 1913 Caproni Ca.22 monoplane
- 1913 Caproni Ca.25 monoplane
- 1913 Castaibert IV monoplane
- 1913 Caudron Type F
- 1913 Caudron Type G 2 seater biplane
- 1913 Caudron Type J tractor
- 1913 Caudron Type K big pusher seaplane
- 1913 Christofferson D hydroplane
- 1913 Christofferson Hydroplane
- 1913 Clement-Bayard Adjudant Vincenot airship
- 1913 Clement-Bayard Biplane
- 1913 Clement-Bayard Monoplane
- 1913 Crocco and Ricaldoni M3 airship
- 1913 Clement-Bayard Montgolfier airship
- 1913 Clement-Bayard No.5 airship
- 1913 Cody floatplane
- 1913 Constantin-Astanieres Safety monoplane
- 1913 Cooke tractor biplane
- 1913 Cooper Biplane
- 1913 Copin-Revillard Monoplane
- 1913 Crawford Pusher biplane
- 1913 Curtiss A-3 US Navy amphibian
- 1913 Curtiss F 2 seater flying boat
- 1913 Curtiss G scout biplane
- 1913 Dahlbeck Biplane
- 1913 Daimler-Lutskoy No.3 monoplane
- 1913 De Brageas Monoplane
- 1913 De Langhe-Corville Monoplane
- 1913 De Marcay-Moonen Seaplane
- 1913 De Monge Parasol monoplane
- 1913 De Simone Parasol monoplane
- 1913 Deperdussin Monaco floatplane
- 1913 Deperdussin Seagull seaplane
- 1913 DFW Stahltaube 2 seater eindecker
- 1913 Donnet-Leveque Flying boat
- 1913 Dorand DO1 biplane
- 1913 Drzewiecki Canard monoplane (also known as Dzhevetsky)
- 1913 Duigan Tractor biplane No.2
- 1913 Dunne D.8 biplane
- 1913 Dunne D.8bis biplane
- 1913 Dux 2 monoplane
- 1913 Dux Meller 2 E pusher biplane
- 1913 Dux Meller 3 monoplane
- 1913 Dybovski Delphin monoplane
- 1913 Dybovski Nieuport Monoplane
- 1913 Dyott monoplane
- 1913 Eastbourne Monoplane
- 1913 EFW Etrich Taube Type 1913 2-seater bomber monoplane
- 1913 Esnault-Pelterie REP I monoplane
- 1913 Euler Eindecker
- 1913 Euler Military doppeldecker
- 1913 Euler Military dreidecker
- 1913 Euler Sea reconnaissance dreidecker
- 1913 Euler Stahltaube
- 1913 Falts-Fein Biplane
- 1913 Farman HF.XIX pusher hydrobiplane
- 1913 Farman HF.XX pusher biplane
- 1913 Farman HF.XXII pusher biplane
- 1913 Farman HF.XXIV pusher biplane
- 1913 Farman MF.VII biplane
- 1913 Farman MF.X seaplane
- 1913 Farman MF.XI and MF.XIbis
- 1913 Farman MF.XVII hydroplane
- 1913 FBA 27 biplane flying boat
- 1913 FBA 28 biplane flying boat
- 1913 Fisher Monoplane
- 1913 Fjallback Naktergaten monoplane
- 1913 Flanders B.3
- 1913 Flanders S.2
- 1913 Flanders F.5
- 1913 Floryanski Biplane
- 1913 Foehn Eindecker
- 1913 Fokker W2 seaplane
- 1913 Forlanini F.2 airship
- 1913 Fournier Monoplane
- 1913 Franchault Monoplane
- 1913 Frantisek Novak No.1 helicopter
- 1913 Frantisek Novak No.2 helicopter
- 1913 Gabardini monoplane
- 1913 Gage-McClay Tractor biplane
- 1913 Galvin Seaplane
- 1913 Garuda Eindecker
- 1913 Gallaudet Monoplane flying boat
- 1913 Gnosspelius Hydrobiplane
- 1913 Gotha LD2 doppeldecker
- 1913 Gotha LE2 doppeldecker
- 1913 Gotha Eindecker
- 1913 Goupy A biplane
- 1913 Goupy B biplane
- 1913 Goupy Hydrobiplane
- 1913 Grahame-White Monoplane
- 1913 Grahame-White VI 2 seater military biplane
- 1913 Grahame-White VII Popular
- 1913 Grahame-White VIII hydrobiplane
- 1913 Grahame-White X Charabanc biplane
- 1913 Gramaticescu No.1 monoplane
- 1913 Grigorovich Schetinin M-3 flying boat (also known as Sch-3)
- 1913 Guillaume Push-pull biplane
- 1913 Handley Page G biplane
- 1913 Hayabusa Biplane
- 1913 Hayot Tandem monoplane
- 1913 Heath 2B flying boat
- 1913 Heinrich D monoplane
- 1913 Henkel-Albatros Taube
- 1913 Huet-Grazzioli-Lombardini Monoplane
- 1913 Iordan Biplane
- 1913 Jannus Flying boat
- 1913 Japanese Army Mo biplane
- 1913 Jatho Seaplane
- 1913 Jeannin Stahltaube
- 1913 Jeanson-Colliex Giant floatplane
- 1913 Kahnt Falke
- 1913 Kaishiki No.3 biplane
- 1913 Kaishiki No.4 biplane
- 1913 Kaishiki No.5 biplane
- 1913 Kaishiki No.6 biplane
- 1913 Kalep-Dybovski Monoplane
- 1913 Karpeka 3 biplane
- 1913 Kasyanenko 4 monoplane
- 1913 Knabel Monoplane
- 1913 Kondor Taube
- 1913 Kovanko AA pusher monoplane
- 1913 Kvasz V
- 1913 Kvasz VI monoplane
- 1913 Laird No.2 baby biplane
- 1913 Lakes Hydromonoplane
- 1913 Lazard Parasol monoplane
- 1913 Lazarus I monoplane
- 1913 Lecomte Monoplane
- 1913 Lecoq-Monteiro-Aillaud 4bis monoplane
- 1913 Lee-Richards annular monoplane
- 1913 Lelieve Monoplane
- 1913 Letai V 2 seater monoplane
- 1913 Leveque-Salmson Biplane
- 1913 Lillie Tractor biplane
- 1913 Lohner E17 flying boat
- 1913 Lohner-Etrich E-1 racing eindecker
- 1913 Lohner-Etrich-Mickl-Paulal M flying boat
- 1913 Lohner Pfeilflieger AD355 racing 2 seater doppeldecker
- 1913 Loughead G flying boat
- 1913 LVG Eindecker
- 1913 Marine Flying boat
- 1913 Martin Hydrobiplane
- 1913 Martin T and TT tractor biplane
- 1913 Martin-Handasyde No.6
- 1913 Martin-Handasyde No.7
- 1913 Martinsyde S-1 biplane
- 1913 Morane-Saulnier Demoiselle monoplane
- 1913 Morane-Saulnier Type L Parasol monoplane
- 1913 Morane-Saulnier Type M 1 seater monoplane
- 1913 Nakajima FU
- 1913 Nieuport Pusher sesquiplane seaplane
- 1913 Nieuport VI.H tandem monoplane seaplane
- 1913 Nieuport X 2 seater monoplane
- 1913 Nieuport XI 1 seater monoplane
- 1913 Nieuport-Dunne flying wing
- 1913 Otto Militartyp doppeldecker
- 1913 Otto Eindecker
- 1913 Parseval PL-8 airship
- 1913 Parseval PL-9 airship
- 1913 Parseval PL-10 airship
- 1913 Parseval PL-12 airship
- 1913 Parseval PL-13 airship
- 1913 Parseval PL-14 airship
- 1913 Parseval PL-16 P-IV airship
- 1913 Parseval PL-17 airship
- 1913 Parseval PL-18 airship
- 1913 Parsons Biplane
- 1913 Partridge-Keller No.1 biplane
- 1913 Partridge-Keller Trainer biplane
- 1913 Paterson No.2bis seabiplane
- 1913 Patterson-Francis Twin tractor flying boat
- 1913 Pega Emich Eindecker
- 1913 Perry Bradle T1 biplane
- 1913 Philippon Tandem monoplane
- 1913 Pippart-Noll PN3 eindecker
- 1913 Placek Multiplane
- 1913 Ponche-Primaud Tubavion
- 1913 Ponnier D.III monoplane
- 1913 Ponnier Cavalrie
- 1913 Prodam III 2 seater military monoplane
- 1913 R.A.A. Kostevich airship
- 1913 Radley-England waterplane No.1
- 1913 Radley-England waterplane No.2
- 1913 Ratmanoff Tandem monoplane 2 seater
- 1913 Royal Aircraft Factory B.E.7
- 1913 Royal Aircraft Factory B.E.8
- 1913 Royal Aircraft Factory B.S.1
- 1913 Royal Aircraft Factory H.R.E.2
- 1913 Royal Aircraft Factory R.E.1
- 1913 Royal Aircraft Factory R.E.2
- 1913 Royal Aircraft Factory S.E.2
- 1913 Riggs-Wehr Biplane
- 1913 Riggs-Wehr Tractor biplane
- 1913 Robinson Monoplane
- 1913 Robiola Idromultiplano
- 1913 Roland Doppeltaube
- 1913 Rosto Monoplane
- 1913 Rozental Monoplane
- 1913 Rudlicki R-1
- 1913 Rumpler Eindecker
- 1913 Sandford-Miller Biplane
- 1913 Schelies Hydromonoplane
- 1913 Schio Italia II airship
- 1913 Schmitt No.7 biplane
- 1913 Schwade Doppeldecker 2 seater
- 1913 Shiukov Canard 1bis and 2
- 1913 Short S.60 tractor biplane
- 1913 Short S.63 tractor seaplane
- 1913 Short S.68 tractor seaplane
- 1913 Short S.80 Nile pusher floatplane
- 1913 Short S.81 pusher floatplane
- 1913 SIA R2 biplane
- 1913 Sikorsky Grand 2 engined tractor biplane
- 1913 Sikorsky S-9 Kruglyi monocoque
- 1913 Sikorsky S-10 and S-10A seaplane
- 1913 Sikorsky S-11 Pulukrugliy monoplane
- 1913 Sikorsky S-21 Russky Vityaz 4 engined biplane with enclosed flight deck
- 1913 Sikorsky S-22 Ilya Mourometz 4 engined biplane with enclosed flight deck
- 1913 Smurov Ornithopter
- 1913 Sonora Biplane
- 1913 Sopwith Bat boat BB1, BB2 and BB3
- 1913 Sopwith D biplane
- 1913 Sopwith DM tractor biplane
- 1913 Sopwith HT biplane
- 1913 Sopwith St. B tractor
- 1913 Sopwith Tabloid floatplane
- 1913 Suranyi II monoplane
- 1913 Sutro Twin tractor hydroaeroplane
- 1913 Svachulay Albatrosz IV
- 1913 Svachulay Albatrosz V
- 1913 Svachulay Hummingbird IV
- 1913 Svechnikov 2
- 1913 Szekely IV 2 seater parasol monoplane
- 1913 Szekely VI Bubu monoplane
- 1913 Takasou No.3 biplane
- 1913 Takasou No.4 biplane
- 1913 Tereschenko 5bis monoplane
- 1913 Tereschenko Pischoff 5 monoplane
- 1913 Thomas Hydro flying boat
- 1913 Thomas Nacelle pusher biplane
- 1913 Thomas Special E biplane
- 1913 Tonini-Bergonzi-Negri TBN Italia 2
- 1913 Toth IV monoplane
- 1913 Toth V monoplane
- 1913 Trebeudin Biplane
- 1913 Tsuzuku Monoplane No.3
- 1913 Union Floatplane
- 1913 Union Pfeil doppeldecker
- 1913 Van Meel Brisk Biplane
- 1913 Vickers EFB.2 18 and 18A biplane
- 1913 Vickers No.7 monoplane
- 1913 Vickers No.8 monoplane
- 1913 Vickers No.26 Pumpkin biplane
- 1913 Vlaicu III
- 1913 Voisin Hydravion
- 1913 Voisin L biplane
- 1913 Voisin Petit Blinde biplane
- 1913 Watson No.3 biplane
- 1913 Wenskus Eindecker
- 1913 Westlake Monoplane
- 1913 White and Thompson No.1 biplane
- 1913 White and Thompson No.2
- 1913 Wight No.1 seaplane
- 1913 Wight No.2 Navy plane
- 1913 Williams Tractor headless biplane
- 1913 Willows No.5 airship
- 1913 Wizina Hummingbird
- 1913 Wong Biplane
- 1913 WPS Eindecker
- 1913 Wright Model CH
- 1913 Wright Model E
- 1913 Wright Model F
- 1913 Wright Model G
- 1913 Wright Model G Aeroboat
- 1913 Wroblewski II 2 seater military armoured monoplane
- 1913 Wullschleger-Peier Triplane (Fritz Wullschleger and Albert Peier)
- 1913 Yamada No.4 airship
- 1913 Zahradnicek Monoplane
- 1913 Zeppelin LZ-17 airship
- 1913 Zeppelin LZ-18 L-2 airship
- 1913 Zodiac No.12 airship
- 1913 Zodiac Spiess No.13 and No.13A airship
- 1913 Zodiac No.14 airship
- 1913 Zodiac No.15 airship
- 1913 Zodiac No.16 airship
- 1913 Zselyi Eindecker II

== Bleriot XI ==
- Blériot XI Artillerie
- Blériot XI Ecole
- Blériot XI Militaire
- Blériot XI R1
- Blériot XI REP
- Blériot XIbis
- Blériot XI-2 Artillerie
- Blériot XI-2 BG
- Blériot XI-2 Genie
- Blériot XI-2 Hauteur
- Blériot XI-2bis
- Blériot XI-3 Concours Militaire 3 seater

== Etrich Taube ==
- Albatros Taube (Produced by the Albatros Flugzeugwerke)
- Albatros Doppeltaube (Biplane version produced by the Albatros Flugzeugwerke)
- Aviatik Taube (Produced by the Automobil und Aviatik AG firm)
- DFW Stahltaube (Version with a steel frame)
- EFW Etrich Taube (Produced by the inventor Igo Etrich and EFW Etrich Flugzeugwerke)
- EFW Etrich II Taube 2-seater tractor monoplane
- EFW Etrich II modified Taube tractor monoplane
- EFW Etrich III Möve (Seagull) tractor monoplane
- EFW Etrich IV Manövertaube Type B military 2-seater monoplane
- EFW Etrich IV Taube tractor monoplane
- EFW Etrich V Taube tractor monoplane
- EFW Etrich VI Taube tractor monoplane
- EFW Etrich VII Renntaube 3-seater racing monoplane
- EFW Etrich VIII Luft-Limousine 4-seater high-wing monoplane
- EFW Etrich IX Schwalbe monoplane
- EFW Etrich XII Rennapparat 2-seater bomber monoplane
- EFW Etrich Taube Type 1913 2-seater bomber monoplane
- EFW Etrich Manövertaube Type F 2-seater military monoplane
- EFW Etrich Etrichapparat monoplane
- Etrich-Rumpler Taube (Initial name of the Rumpler Taube)
- Gotha Taube (Produced by the Gothaer Waggonfabrik as the LE1, LE2 and LE3 (land eindecker means land monoplane) and designated A.I by the Idflieg)
- Harlan Pfeil Taube
- Halberstadt Taube III (Produced by the Halberstadt)
- Jeannin Taube (Jeannin Stahltaube version with a steel tubing fuselage structure)
- Kondor Taube (Produced by the Kondor)
- RFG Taube (Produced by the Reise und Industrieflug GmbH (RFG))
- Roland Taube
- Rumpler Taube (Produced by Rumpler Luftfahrzeugbau)
- Rumpler Delfin-Taube (Rumpler Kabinentaube Delfin version with a closed cabin, produced by Rumpler Luftfahrzeugbau)

== Bibliography ==
- Crouch, Tom D. (2002). A dream of wings: Americans and the airplane, 1875-1905. New York & London: W. W. Norton & company. ISBN 9780393347456.
- Flight international. Vol. 70. USA: IPC Transport press limited. 1956.
- Phythyon, John R. (2007). Great war at sea: Zeppelins. Virginia beach, Virginia: Avalanche press, Inc.
- Trimble, William F. (1982). High frontier: A history of aeronautics in Pennsylvania. Pittsburgh: University of Pittsburgh press. p. 58. ISBN 9780822974260.
