= Astra Clément-Bayard =

French dirigible manufacturer

Astra Clément-Bayard was a French manufacturer of dirigibles.

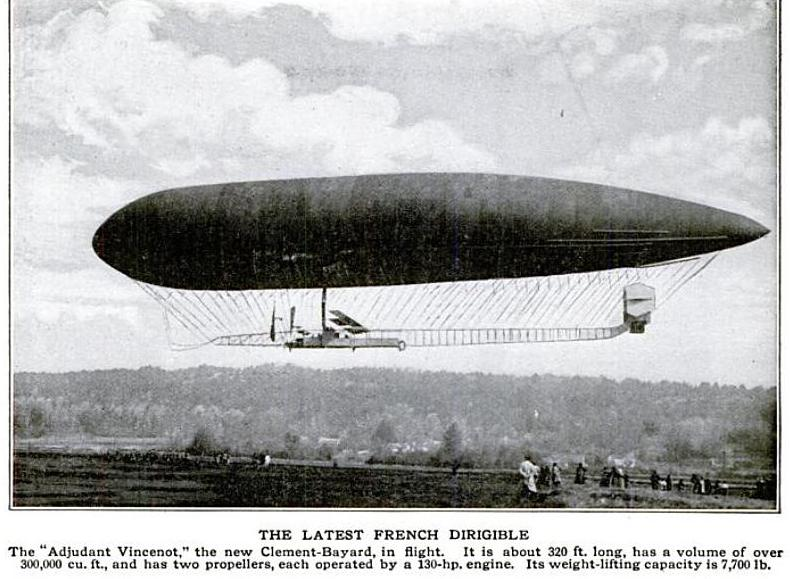
Clément-Bayard Airship No 4, the "Adjudant Vincenot" circa 1910. Caption from Popular Mechanics magazine 1910

In 1908 the French industrialist Adolphe Clément-Bayard, who had already made a fortune manufacturing cars, motorcycles and bicycles, diversified into the aviation industry. His first project was a lens-shaped airship designed by Louis Capazza, which was never built. He then collaborated with the Société Astra (Société Astra des Constructions Aéronautiques) on the manufacture of a more conventional craft. Astra were responsible for the manufacture of the envelope, and Clément-Bayard took responsibility for the nacelle and engine. After this collaborative effort the company started manufacturing the envelopes as well, at a new factory in La Motte-Breuil built in anticipation of orders from the French Army, who had decided to commence airship operations.

The Clément-Bayard No.1 airship was offered to the French government but was too expensive so it was bought by Tsar Nicholas II for the Russian army.

In 1910 the Clément-Bayard No.2, piloted by Maurice Clément-Bayard, was the first airship to cross the Channel, travelling over 380 kilometres (240 mi) in six hours. The French army ordered three.

The company was bought by Citroën in 1922.

The airship hangar in La Motte-Breuil is still maintained by Clément-Talbot Ltd.

== Clément-Bayard dirigibles ==
Seven Clément-Bayard airships were completed.

- N° 1 was 56.25 metres (184 ft 7 in) long, 10.58 m (34 ft 9 in) wide, 3,500 cubic metres (120,000 ft^{3}) capacity, powered by 2 Clément-Bayard 115 hp engines. First flew on 28 October 1908.
- N° 2 was 76.50 m (251 ft 0 in) long, 13.22 m (43 ft 4 in) wide, 7,000 m^{3} (250,000 ft^{3}) capacity, powered by 2 Clément-Bayard 120 hp engines. Top speed 54 km/h. First flew on 1 June 1910.
- N° 3 Dupuy de Lôme, 89.0 m (292 ft 0 in) long, 13.5 m (44 ft 3 in) wide, 9,000 m^{3} (320,000 ft^{3}) capacity, powered by 2 Clément-Bayard 120 hp engines. First flew on 1 May 1912.
- N° 4 Adjudant Vincenot, 88.5 m (290 ft 4 in) long, 13.50 m (44 ft 3 in)wide, 9,800 m^{3} (350,000 ft^{3}) capacity, powered by 2 Clément-Bayard 120 hp engines. Top speed 49 km/h. First flew in 1911.
- Adj Vincenot modified, 87.3 m (286 ft 5 in) metres long, 13.50 m (44 ft 3 in) wide, 9,800 m^{3} (350,000 ft^{3}) capacity, powered by 2 Clément-Bayard 120 engines. Top speed 53 km/h. First flew on 13 August 1913.
- N° 5 livré à la Russie, 86.0 m (282 ft 2 in) long, 13.50 m (44 ft 3 in) wide, 9,500 m^{3} (340,000 ft^{3}) capacity, powered by 2 Clément-Bayard 130 hp engines. First flew on 9 February 1913.
- Montgolfier, 73.50 m (241 ft 2 in)long, 12.2 m (40 ft 0 in)12.2 metres wide, 6,500 m^{3} (230,000 ft^{3}) capacity, powered by 2 Clément-Bayard 90 hp engines. Top speed 60 km/h. First flew on 31 July 1913.

== See also ==
- Société Astra (Société Astra des Constructions Aéronautiques)
