= Paterson Biplane =

British biplane

General information
- Type: Experimental biplane
- National origin: United Kingdom
- Designer: Cecil Compton Paterson
- Number built: 2

History
- First flight: 14 May 1910

The Paterson Biplane was an early British biplane designed by Cecil Compton Paterson and built at the Liverpool Motor House, where Paterson was a director. It was later called the Paterson No. 1 Biplane to distinguish it from subsequent aircraft designed by Paterson.

== Design and development ==
Built between 1909 and 1910, the Paterson Biplane had a design similar to that of the Curtiss Biplane. It was an open-framed pusher biplane with a main frame made from bamboo and a tubular steel tricycle landing gear. It had a biplane front elevator and a single rear elevator with a rudder. It first flew from the beach at Freshfield north of Liverpool on 14 May 1910. It flew a second time on 23 June 1910 but was damaged: after repair, it was used by Paterson to obtain his aviator's certificate, issued in December 1910. He built a second Biplane with a larger engine for Gerald Higginbotham, later called Biplane No. 2. This was completed in January 1911. Both aircraft were based at Freshfield.

== Variants ==
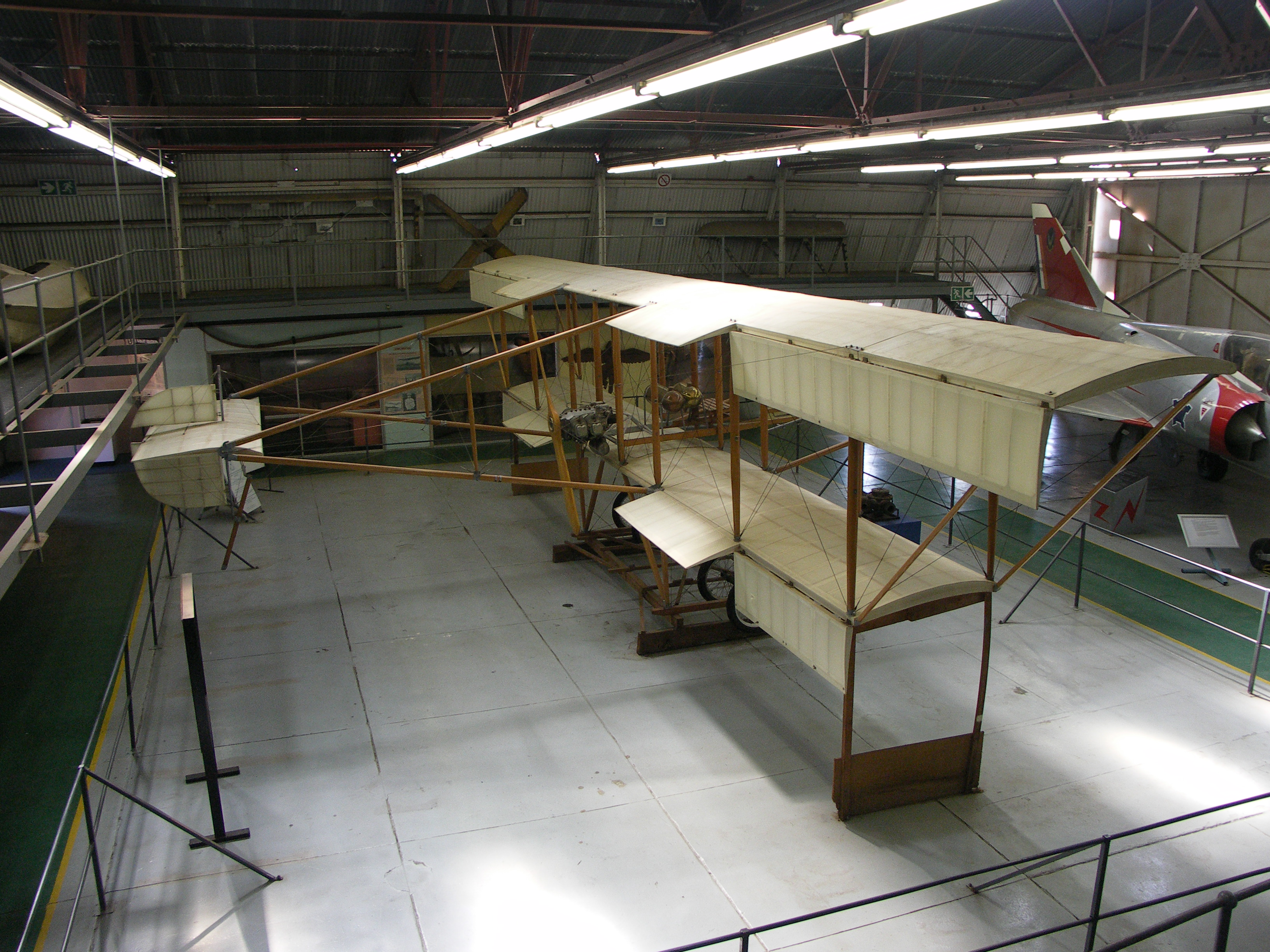
Replica Patterson No. 2 biplane at the South African Air Force Museum, AFB Swartkop

Biplane No. 1
Anzani powered early biplane.
Biplane No. 2
Similar aircraft with a 50 hp (37 kW) Gnome air-cooled rotary engine.

== Specifications (No. 1) ==
General characteristics

- Crew: 1
- Length: 31 ft 0 in (9.45 m)
- Wingspan: 34 ft 4 in (10.47 m)
- Powerplant: 1 × Anzani three-cylinder air-cooled piston engine , 30 hp (22 kW)
