= Humphreys Biplane =

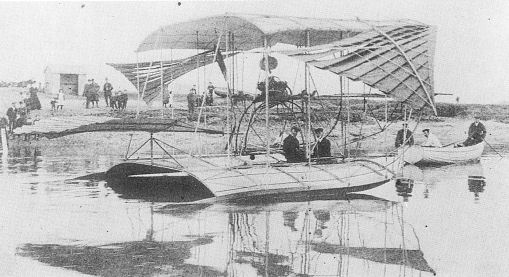

General information
- Type: Biplane flying boat
- National origin: United Kingdom
- Designer: Jack Humphreys
- Number built: 1

History
- Introduction date: 1909

The Humphreys Biplane was the first serious attempt to build a flying boat in the United Kingdom. Also known as the Wivenhoe Flyer it was designed by dentist Jack Humphreys; it failed to fly.

== Design and development ==
With the help of Forrestt's boatyard, construction by Humphreys of the biplane started in 1908 near Wivenhoe on the River Colne, Essex. With a span of 45 feet it was a sesquiplane biplane with a single-seat hull. The biplane had a 35 hp (26 kW) JAP V8 air-cooled engine which drove two counter-rotating propellers.

The biplane was launched on 3 April 1909 but it turned turtle and sank due to an accident. Recovered and tested again, The Times reported in April 1909 that a further trial was abandoned when the gearing between the engine and the propellers failed. In May 1909 it did manage to skim the water at speed of 12 knots but failed to overcome the drag in the design and failed to fly.

== Specifications ==
Data from London

General characteristics

- Crew: 1
- Length: 38 ft 0 in (11.58 m)
- Wingspan: 45 ft 0 in (13.72 m)
- Wing area: 650 sq ft (60 m^{2}) approximate
- Gross weight: 1,750 lb (794 kg) approximate
- Powerplant: 1 × J.A.P. V8 air-cooled piston engine, 38 hp (28 kW)
