= Ford-Van Auken 1909 Monoplane =

General information
- Type: Monoplane
- National origin: United States
- Manufacturer: Ford Motor Company
- Designer: Charles Van Auken
- Number built: 1

History
- First flight: 1909

The Ford-Van Auken 1909 Monoplane was the first of a series of aircraft built with and for the Ford Motor Company.

== Design and development ==
The Monoplane's design was started in 1908 by Charles Van Auken using plans of a Blériot XI as a guide. A Ford Model T engine with holes bored throughout to lighten the weight was used as a powerplant. The aircraft was a conventional landing gear-equipped, wire braced, mid-wing monoplane with a fabric covered cruciform empennage and warping wings for roll control. The aircraft bore a striking resemblance to the Blériot XI.

== Operational history ==
In 1909, the aircraft was test flown by Van Auken in Dearborn Michigan, flying in ground effect before crashing into a fence. The engine was modified for more power and the aircraft was flown a second time in 1910 at the Fort Wayne parade grounds; after becoming airborne, Van Auken lost control and crashed into a tree.

== Specifications (1909 Monoplane) ==
Data from The Youth's Companion and Sherman

General characteristics

- Crew: 1
- Powerplant: 1 × Ford Model T engine Four cylinder inline piston engine, 28 hp (21 kW)
- Propellers: 2-bladed Wood

Performance

- Service ceiling: 8 ft (2.4 m)
