= Penkala 1910 Biplane =

Early Croatian aircraft

Penkala Biplane
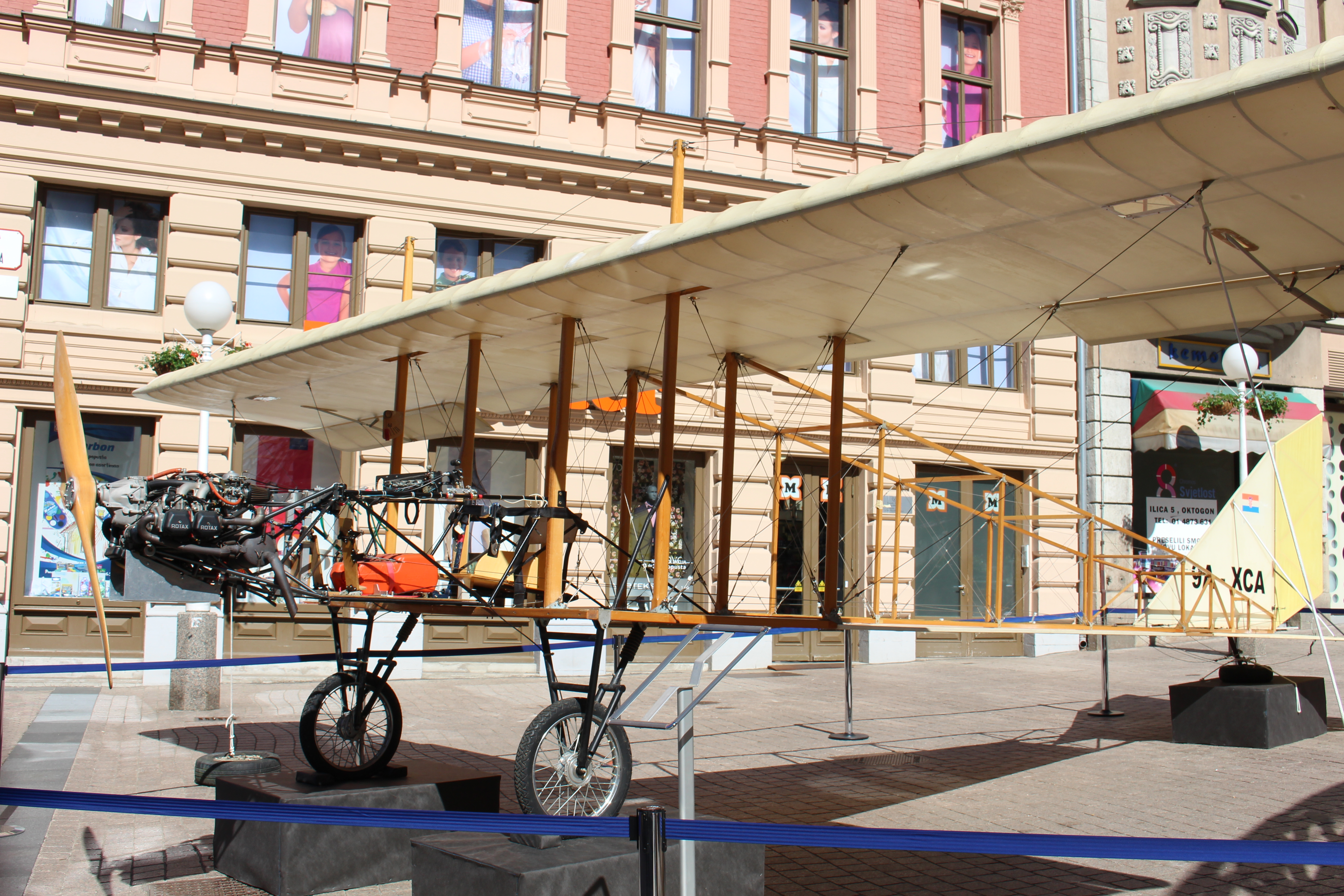
- CA-10 replica of the 1910 Biplane

General information
- Type: Pioneering aircraft
- National origin: Croatia
- Designer: Slavoljub Eduard Penkala

History
- Introduction date: 1910
- First flight: 22 June 1910

The 1910 Penkala Biplane also called the Leptir (English: Butterfly) was the first aircraft to fly in Croatia.

== Design and development ==
The Leptir was a single engine, sesquiplane aircraft with conventional landing gear. The open girder fuselage provides an unusually long distance to the tail surfaces, compared to modern aircraft. The flat bottom surface of the fuselage was covered, forming a long thin triangular surface intended to provide lift, which was not functional in level flight. The aircraft was tail heavy with a center of gravity at 70 percent of wing chord.

== Operational history ==
The first flight occurred on 22 June 1910 with pilot Dragutin Novak. The aircraft was crashed several months later.

== Variants ==
1910 Biplane
Original design
1910 Leptir II
Modifications to include skids
2010 CA-10 Replica
Replica aircraft - Powered by 80 hp (60 kW) Rotax 912 with the center of gravity moved forward for safety.

== Specifications (Penkala Biplane) ==
Data from Sport Aviation

General characteristics

- Crew: 1
- Length: 11 m (36 ft 1 in)
- Wingspan: 11 m (36 ft 1 in)
- Empty weight: 330 kg (728 lb)
- Propellers: 2-bladed
