= Clément-Bayard No.2 =

Airship

No.2
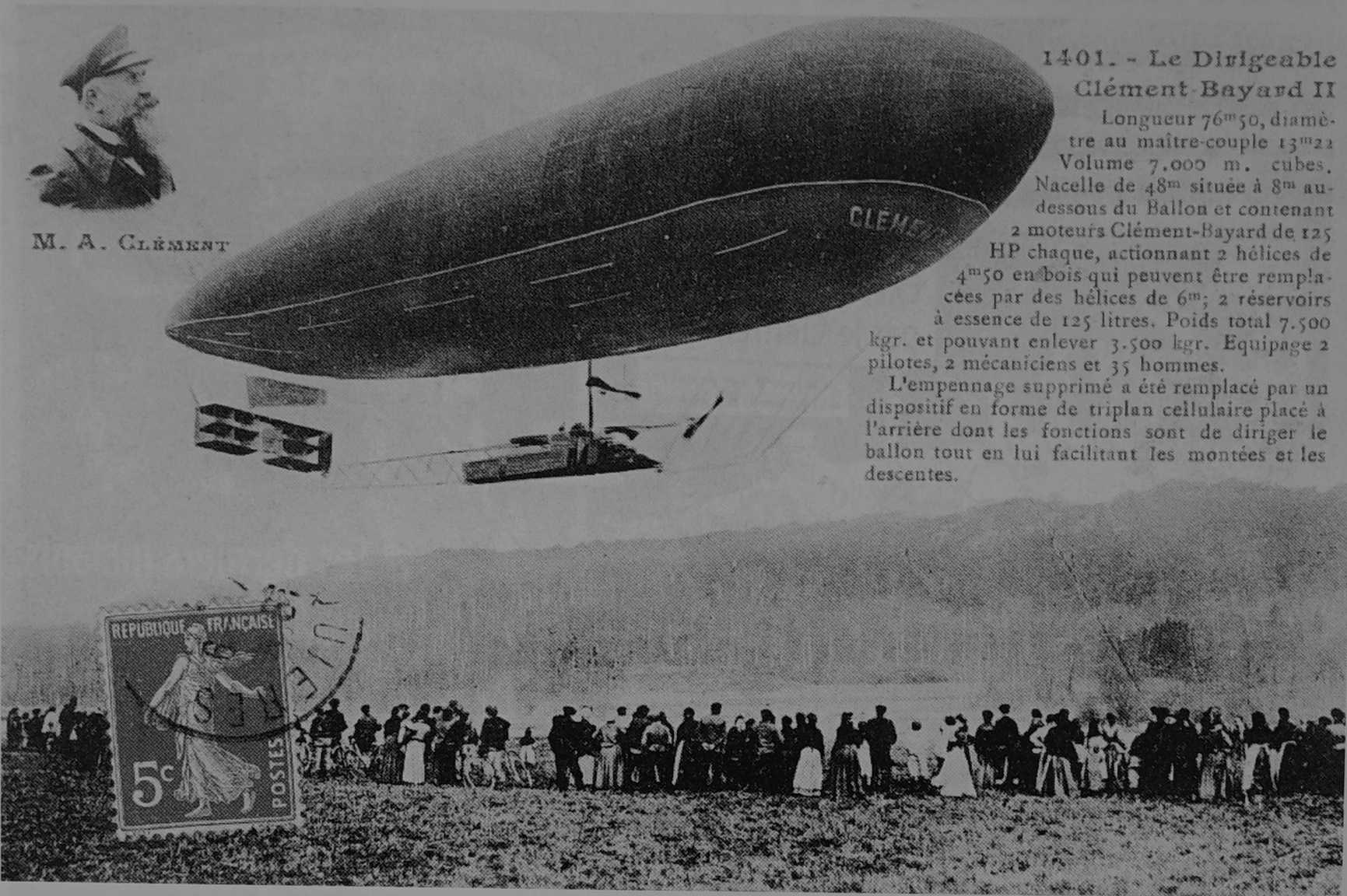

General information
- Type: Military airship
- Manufacturer: Clément-Bayard
- Number built: 1

History
- First flight: 10 April 1910

The Clément-Bayard No.2 was a French military airship of 1910, developed by automobile manufacturer Clément-Bayard. Unlike their previous design, this aircraft was designed and built entirely by the firm itself. On 7 September 1910, the airship was used to make the first aerial wireless communications, sending and receiving messages to the Eiffel Tower with a 65 kg (143 lb) transmitter carried aboard.

The No.2 was offered for sale to the French Army, at FF 200,000 (less than half the price of No.1), but was again rejected as too expensive. It was next offered to sale to the UK, and on 16 October Maurice Clément himself piloted it across the English Channel, setting off from Breuil at 6:55 am and arriving at Wormwood Scrubs, where The Daily Mail newspaper had funded construction of an airship shed, at 1:25 pm, where around 3000 people had gathered to see it arrive. After arrival, it was purchased by the War Office for £18,000 (around 450,000 French francs). However, after deflation to transport to another airship base, it was damaged during ground transit so extensively that it was judged beyond repair and never flew again.

== Specifications ==
General characteristics

- Length: 76.50 m (251 ft 0 in)
- Diameter: 13.22 m (43 ft 5 in)
- Volume: 7,000 m^{3} (247,200 cu ft)
- Powerplant: 2 × Clément-Bayard , 90 kW (120 hp) each

Performance

== See also ==
- Société Astra (Société Astra des Constructions Aéronautiques)
