= Rossel-Peugeot monoplane =

1910s French aircraft

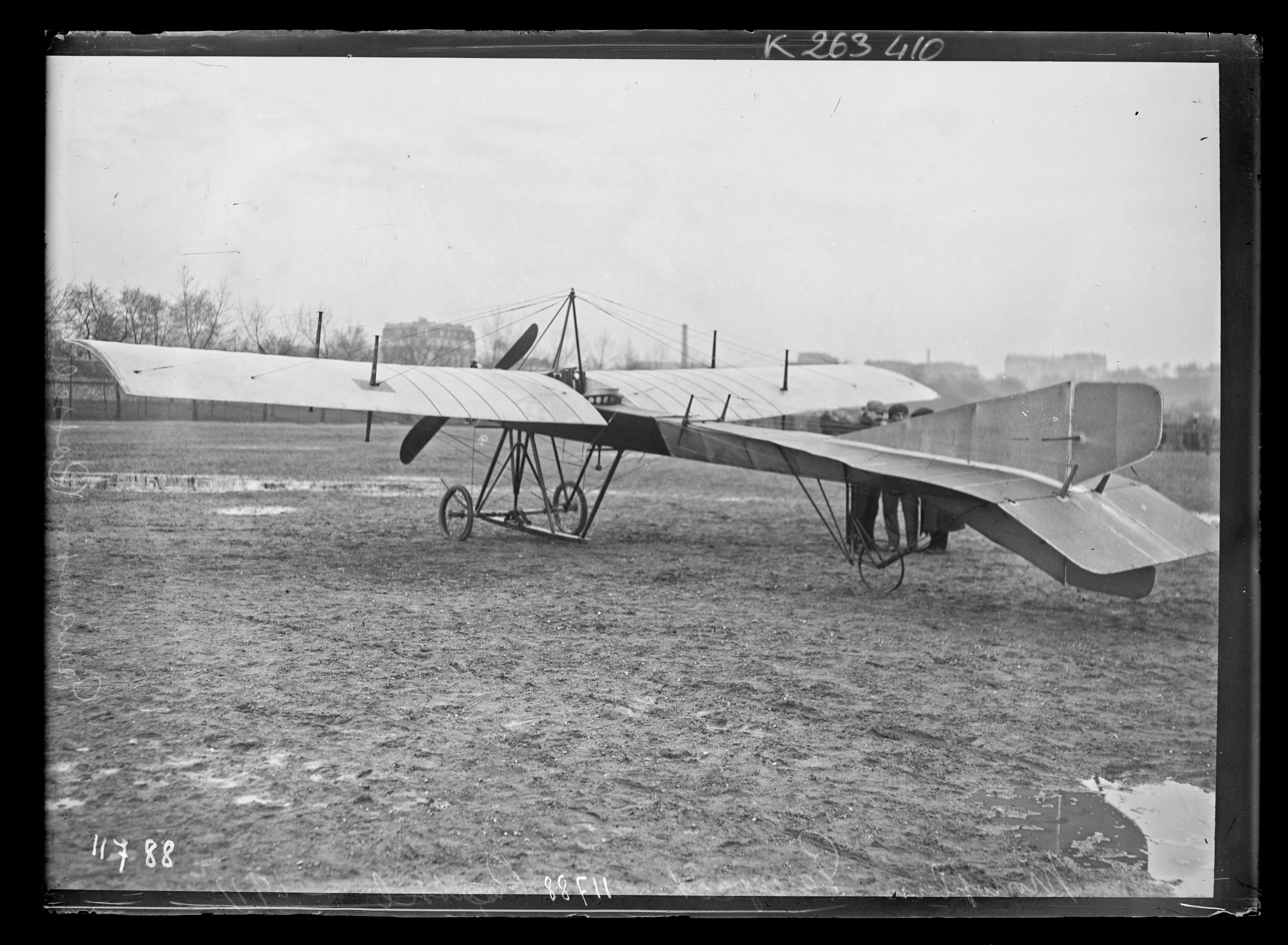

General information
- Type: Experimental aircraft
- National origin: France
- Designer: Robert Savary
- Number built: 1

History
- Introduction date: 1910

The Rossel-Peugeot monoplane was a French experimental aircraft built in the early 1910s.

== Specifications ==
Data from

General characteristics

- Crew: 1
- Length: 9.30 m (30 ft 6 in)
- Wingspan: 10.20 m (33 ft 6 in)
- Wing area: 20.00 m^{2} (215.3 sq ft)
- Gross weight: 350 kg (772 lb)
- Powerplant: 1 × Gnome 7 Omega 7-cylinder air-cooled rotary piston engine, 37 kW (50 hp)
- Propellers: 2-bladed fixed-pitch propeller

Performance
