= Goupy No.2 =

No.2 and No.3
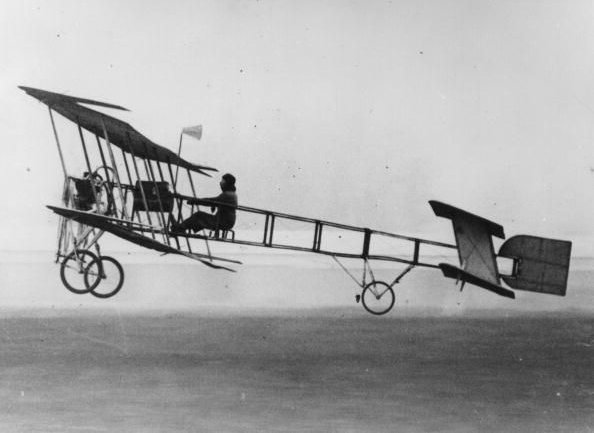

General information
- Type: Experimental aircraft
- National origin: France
- Manufacturer: Blériot Aéronautique
- Designer: Ambroise Goupy; Mario Calderara
- Number built: 1

History
- First flight: 9 March 1909

The Goupy No.2 was an experimental aircraft designed by Ambroise Goupy and Mario Calderara(it) and built in France in 1909 at the Blériot factory at Buc. The Goupy No.2 is significant for two major and influential innovations in aircraft design: it was the first tractor configuration biplane to fly and the first biplane to feature staggered wings, built with a landing gear configuration nearly identical in appearance to the Blériot XI monoplane, flown earlier that year. While both these features would very soon become the norm in aircraft design, the No.2 was described in the aviation press at the time as having a "somewhat unusual design". The only features that would not be typical of aircraft in the years to come would be its biplane tail unit, and the whole-chord wingtip ailerons fitted to both upper and lower wings. The uncovered wood box-girder fuselage, typical of early aircraft, was later covered.

It first flew in March 1909, and the following year was displayed at the Paris Salon. It flew competitively at the 1910 Reims air show, and made exhibition flights at British aviation meets at Burton and Doncaster, piloted by Emile Ladougne. The Goupy No.3 differed only in detail: the biplane tail was replaced by a single elevator, the undercarriage was modified, and changes were made to the controls.

== Specifications ==
General characteristics

- Crew: One pilot
- Length: 7.00 m (23 ft 0 in)
- Wingspan: 6.00 m (19 ft 8 in)
- Wing area: 26.0 m^{2} (280 sq ft)
- Empty weight: 209 kg (460 lb)
- Gross weight: 290 kg (640 lb)
- Powerplant: 1 × REP , 22 kW (29 hp)

Performance

- Maximum speed: 97 km/h (61 mph, 53 kn)
