= Star Monoplane =

General information
- Type: Experimental aircraft
- National origin: United Kingdom
- Manufacturer: Star Engineering Company
- Designer: Granville Bradshaw.
- Number built: 1

The Star Monoplane was an early British aircraft built by the Star Engineering Company of Wolverhampton. A tractor configuration monoplane resembling the French Antoinette aircraft, its most remarkable feature was the arrangement of the rear control surfaces. It was exhibited at the Aero Exhibition at Olympia in London, in 1910.

== Design and development ==
The Star Monoplane had an uncovered triangular section fuselage of wire-braced ash, with the wings attached to the upper longerons and the pilot seated behind the trailing edge of the wing. The fuselage divided into two sections aft of the cockpit for ease of transportation. The parallel-chord wings had rounded ends and wing warping control, the wires leading to a single king-post above the wing and to the ends of the undercarriage struts, which bore twin skids, carrying two wheels on a sprung axle. The tail surfaces consisted of a cruciform arrangement of four elongated triangular surfaces starting halfway down the fuselage, ending in raked ends bearing the outer pivots of the moving surfaces, each of which was an elongated diamond shape resembling a Malay kite. These could be used conventionally as rudders and elevators or alternatively operated as linked opposing pairs, so that their operation would cause the aircraft to roll to one side or the other. It was powered by a 30 hp (22 kW) Star engine driving a 6 ft 8 in (2 m) Clarke propeller.

Trials of this arrangement were not satisfactory and, during 1911, the aircraft was extensively modified. The lower fin and moving surface was removed and the remaining surfaces' controls altered to produce the conventional arrangement of rudder and elevators. The wings were reduced in span by 5 ft (1.5 m) and the tailwheel was replaced by a skid. It was also fitted with a new 50 hp (37 kW) Star engine.

== Specifications (Final form) ==
Data from Lewis, P British Aircraft 1809-1914 London: Putnam, 1962.

General characteristics

- Crew: 1
- Length: 32 ft 6 in (9.91 m)
- Wingspan: 37 ft (11 m)
- Powerplant: 1 × Star Inline 6-cylinder water cooled piston engine, 50 hp (37 kW)
- Propellers: 2-bladed Clarke, 6 ft 8 in (2.03 m) diameter

Performance

- Maximum speed: 45 mph (72 km/h, 39 kn)
