= Caproni Ca.13 =

1910s Italian experimental aircraft

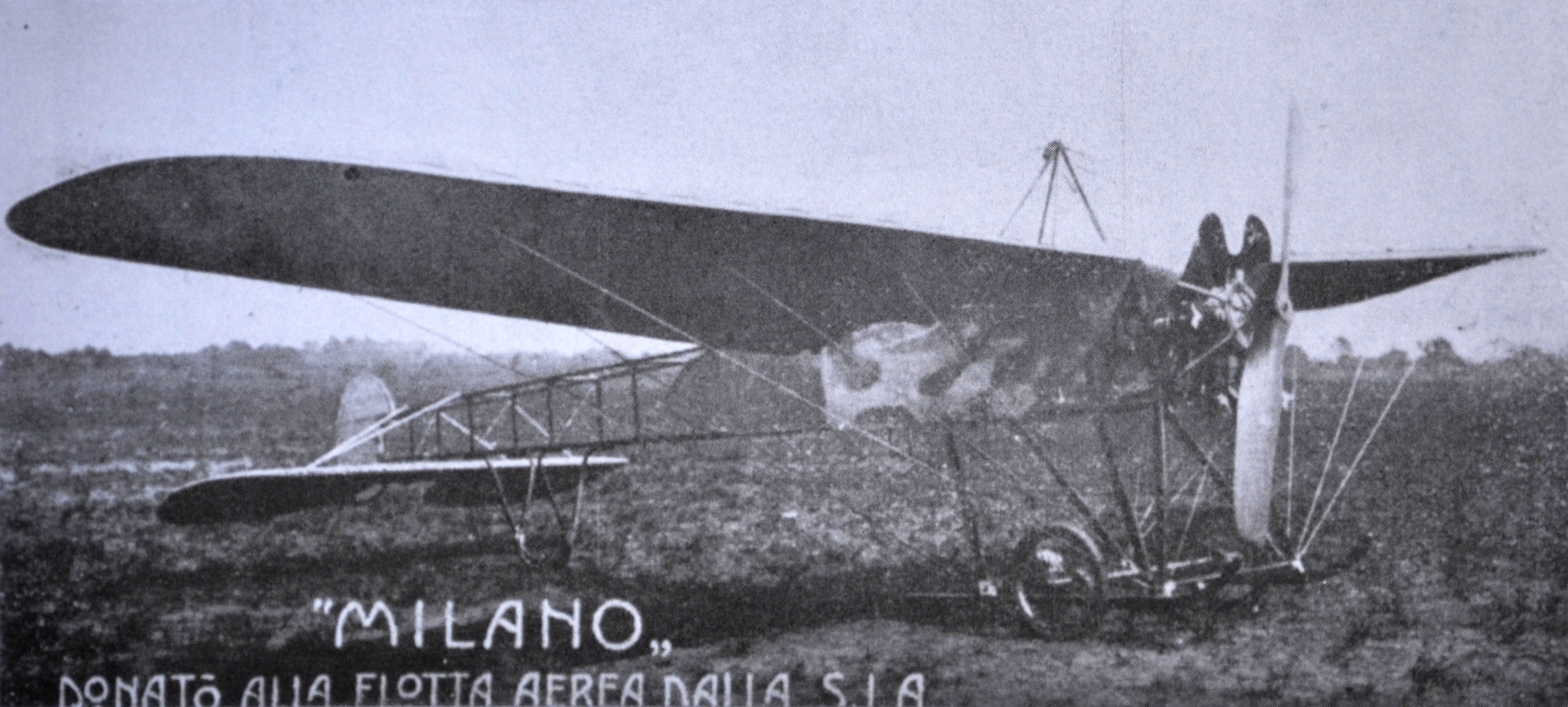
- Milano I

General information
- Type: Experimental aircraft
- Manufacturer: Caproni
- Status: Retired
- Number built: 1

History
- First flight: 1912 June 11

The Caproni Ca.13 was a two-seater single-engine monoplane built by Caproni in the early 1910s.

== Design ==
The Ca.13 was a modern high wing monoplane with a wooden structure and canvas covering, equipped with a wing warping system to control roll and reinforced by metal tie rods connected to the fuselage and to a special structure placed above it; the fuselage was based on a wooden lattice structure, in turn reinforced by metal cables, and was covered in cloth only for the front half; the same wooden structure with a canvas covering characterized the empennages. The fixed undercarriage was composed of two front wheels with anti-overblank pads and another smaller, tailed shoe.

The Ca.13, like the Ca.12 from which it was directly derived, was a two-seater with the two cockpits arranged "in tandem" (i.e. one behind the other); the engine was an Anzani radial capable of developing a power of 70 hp. The Ca.13 differed from the immediate predecessor for the different curvature of the wings and for the different ratios between the areas of the front and rear surfaces.

== Career ==
The Ca.13 was a two-seater designed for training and experimental military applications. It flew for the first time around the middle of 1912 (probably on 11 June) and soon showed excellent characteristics especially in terms of speed, reaching 129,900 km / h during a test flight.

Meanwhile, on May 20, Caproni had made arrangements with the Italian Aviation Society (S.I.A.) for the supply of a Caproni Ca.13 so that it, in turn, could offer it to the Royal Army. Thanks to this economic agreement, Caproni (which was in financial straits) could get a 70-80 hp Anzani, a particularly powerful and expensive engine. However, when he learned of an international aviation competition to be held in Vienna, he asked and obtained to postpone the delivery of the aircraft to the Holy See. in order to allow the new aircraft to participate in the competition; as a driver Enrico Cobioni was chosen, who had already distinguished himself by beating a series of national and world records with the previous Caproni models.

When they arrived at Aspern, near Vienna, in the second half of June, Ca.13 and his pilot gave good proof especially as regards speed; however, on 27 June, towards the end of the Wiener Neustadt-Aspern race, the engine went down and Cobioni, who was also among the first at the head of the race, was forced to make a lucky landing; there were no consequences, but the race ended for the Caproni team with nothing done.

At the same time, in Vizzola Ticino, another example of Ca.13 was prepared to satisfy the request of S.I.A. The plane was ready for testing on 12 July 1912 and, on that date, a sort of party was held at the Caproni workshops, a public celebration for the delivery of the new aircraft to which a crowd of curious, journalists, sportsmen and military. The plane, called "Milano I" with the traditional naval ceremony of the breaking of a bottle, took off without problems either with only the Cobioni on board, or with a passenger in the rear passenger compartment. Even the lady who had baptized the aircraft, the marquise Diana Crespi, was flown by Cobioni. The altitude test was also successful; however, a few days later, while Ca.13 was subjected to a flight duration test, the engine broke in the same way as that of the plane brought to Vienna; both were then replaced, and the aircraft were equipped with 60 hp engines.

Later, however, the order given by the Aviation Battalion Battalion of the Air Force Service to train all military pilots in military schools (which greatly reduced the activity of the Caproni civil school) and the removal of Cobioni (which, returning to Switzerland in search of more substantial earnings, deprived Caproni of his most experienced pilot and the only pilot who had piloted aircraft with power greater than 35 hp) made sure that the activity of the Caproni company was reduced a lot; the situation remained stagnant for the rest of the summer of 1912.

== Specifications ==
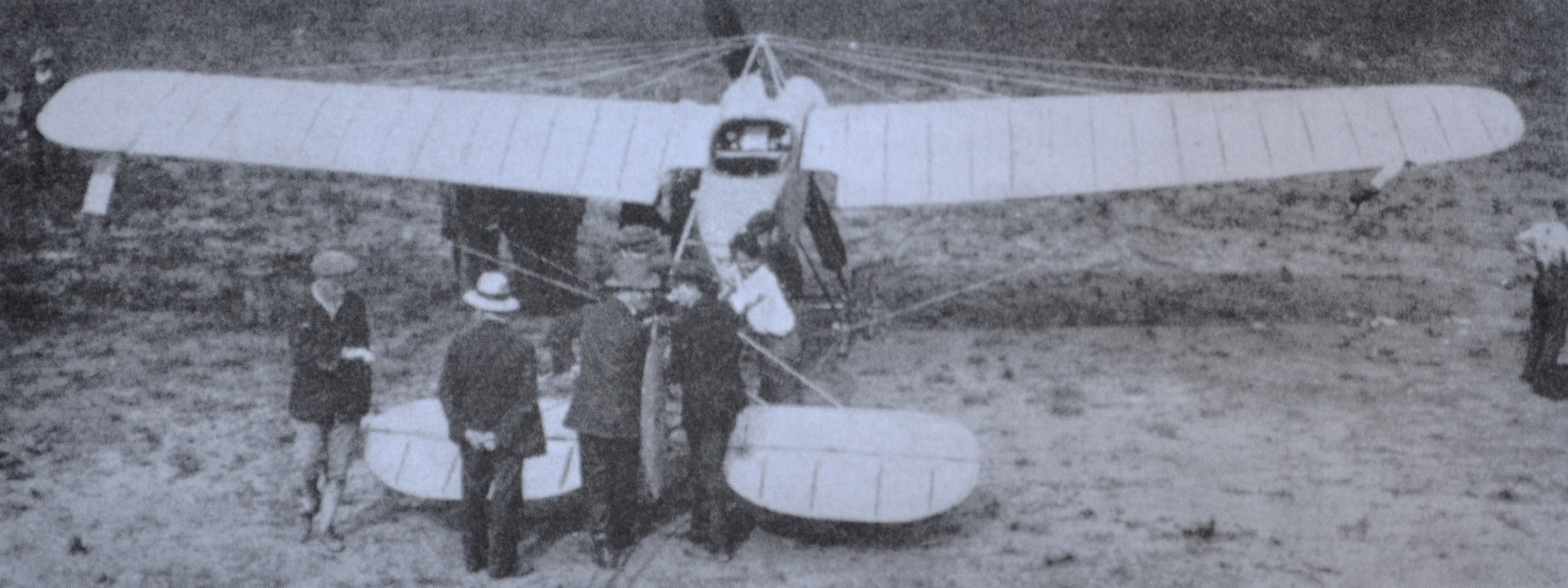
top view

Data from Aeroplani Caproni – Gianni Caproni ideatore e costruttore di ali italiane

General characteristics

- Crew: Two
- Length: 8.40 m (27 ft 7 in)
- Wingspan: 11.28 m (37 ft 0 in)
- Wing area: 22 m^{2} (240 sq ft)
- Empty weight: 400 kg (882 lb)
- Gross weight: 650 kg (1,433 lb)
- Powerplant: 1 × Anzani 6-cylinder air-cooled radial piston engine, 52 kW (70 hp)
- Propellers: 2-bladed wooden fixed-pitch propeller

Performance

- Maximum speed: 130 km/h (81 mph, 70 kn)

== See also ==
- Giovanni Battista Caproni
- Museo dell'Aeronautica Gianni Caproni
