= Blériot XL =

1910s French aircraft

General information
- Type: Observation aircraft
- National origin: France
- Manufacturer: Recherches Aéronautique Louis Blériot

History
- First flight: 1913

The Bleriot XL was a two-seat observation sesquiplane designed in France by Louis Bleriot during the early 1910s. Its structure was made of metallic materials.

== Specifications ==
Data from

General characteristics

- Crew: 2
- Length: 9.15 m (30 ft 0 in)
- Wingspan: 12.70 m (41 ft 8 in)
- Wing area: 38 m^{2} (410 sq ft)
- Empty weight: 390 kg (860 lb)
- Gross weight: 690 kg (1,521 lb)
- Powerplant: 1 × Gnome Monosoupape 7 Type A 7-cylinder air-cooled rotary piston engine, 60 kW (80 hp)
- Propellers: 2-bladed
- Maximum speed: 90 km/h (56 mph, 49 kn)
- Service ceiling: 1,000 m (3,300 ft)
