= Clément-Bayard No.1 =

Airship

No.1
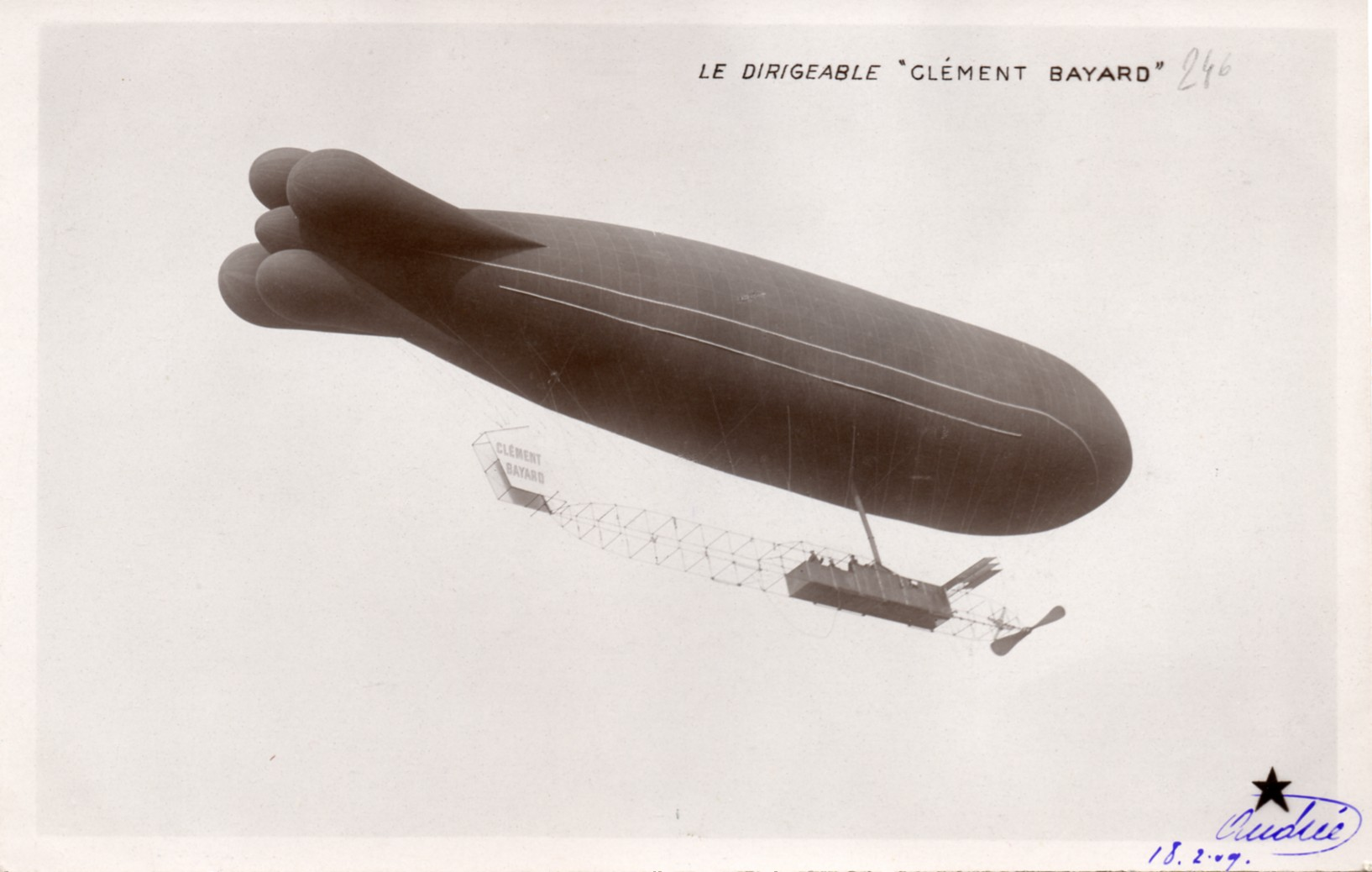

General information
- Type: Military airship
- Manufacturer: Clément-Bayard
- Number built: 1

History
- First flight: 29 October 1908

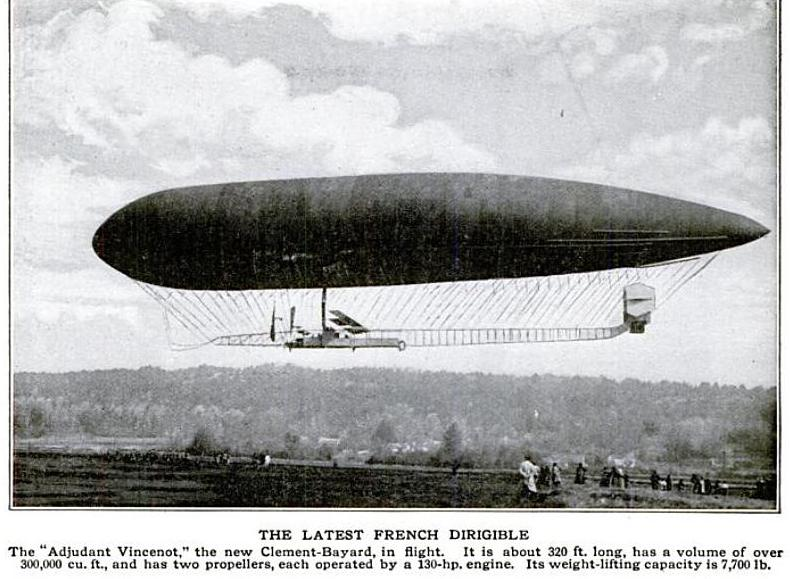
Clément-Bayard Airship No 1, The "Adjudant Vincenot" circa 1910. Caption from Popular Mechanics magazine 1910

The Clément-Bayard No.1, Bayard-Clément was a French military semi-rigid airship of 1908 developed by Astra Clément-Bayard, which was founded by industrial entrepreneur Adolphe Clément-Bayard, in response to a French Army decision to experiment with airship operations.

== History ==
Société Astra was contracted to build the envelope, while Clément-Bayard built the gondola and engines itself. The envelope's distinctive design featured four large lobes at the aft end, intended to provide directional stability. Testing commenced on 29 October with Henry Kapferer at the controls. By the end of the year, the airship had made nearly thirty flights, including long-range cross-country sorties of up to 200 km (120 mi), breaking the national aerial endurance and speed records.

In 1909 the airship was offered for sale to the French government, with an asking price of FF 500,000. However, this was considered too expensive, and the offer was declined. Later that year, Tsar Nicholas II decided to buy it for the Russian army. On 23 August, it was demonstrated to a Russian military delegation in Paris where it was piloted by Louis Capazza firstly to a record altitude of 1,200 m (4,000 ft) and then hours later to a new record of 1,550 m (5,080 ft). Upon landing, however, Capazza cut power to the engines before the ground handlers had full control of the craft. A gust of wind carried it into a grove of trees, lacerating the envelope and resulting in it sinking into the River Seine, but it was salvaged and repaired, and went on to serve with the Russian Army under the name Berkut ("Eagle").

== Specifications ==
Data from

General characteristics

- Length: 56.25 m (184 ft 7 in)
- Diameter: 10.58 m (34 ft 9 in)
- Volume: 3,500 m^{3} (120,000 cu ft)
- Powerplant: 1 × Clément-Bayard , 78 kW (105 hp)
- Propellers: 2-bladed Chauvière Integrale, 5 m (16 ft 5 in) diameter

== See also ==
- Société Astra (Société Astra des Constructions Aéronautiques)
