= Lebaudy Morning Post =

Airship

Morning Post
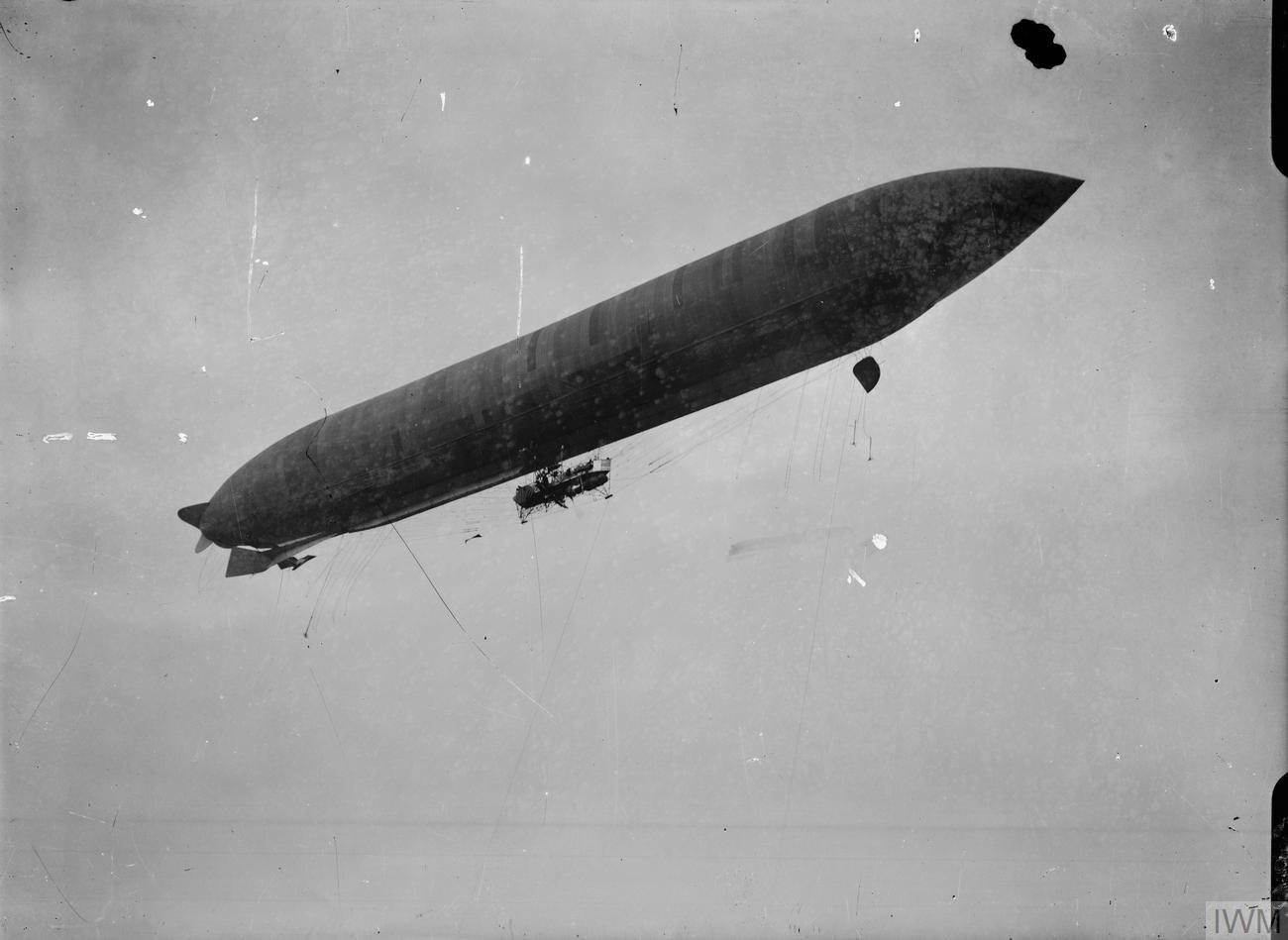

General information
- Type: Military reconnaissance airship
- Manufacturer: Lebaudy Frères, Moisson, France
- Owners: British Army

History
- First flight: September 1910
- In service: 1910-1911
- Last flight: May 1911
- Fate: Destroyed

The Lebaudy Morning Post was a French semi-rigid airship built for the British Army in Moisson, France, by manufacturers Lebaudy Frères. The airship was commissioned by the newspaper The Morning Post, who created a fund to purchase the airship and present it to the British Army. The airship's envelope was damaged on the delivery flight and then it was destroyed on a subsequent trial flight after repair. At the time of construction it was the largest airship that had been built in France.

== Design and development ==
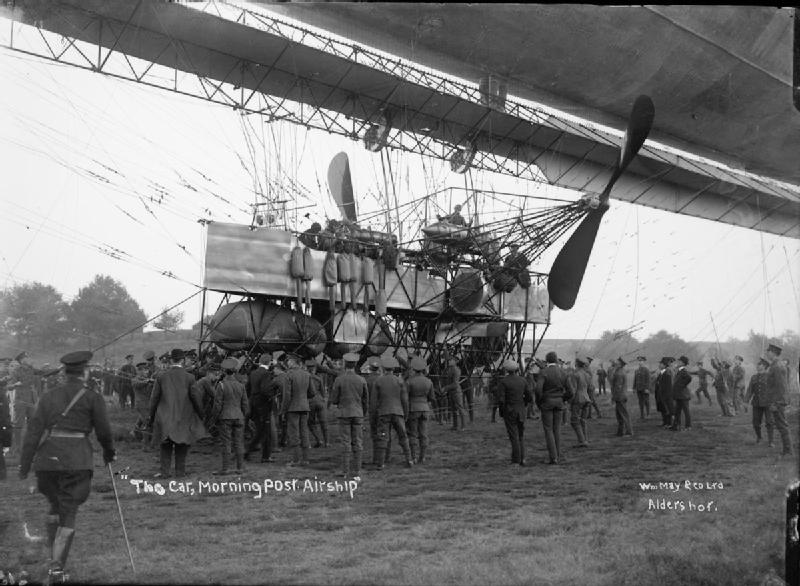
The Car of the Morning Post

The Morning Post was designed by Henri Julliot to the same principles as the earlier Lebaudy République and Lebaudy Patrie but was larger and faster. The envelope was made of panels of waterproof canvas with two valves at the bottom to allow the hydrogen to be released, either automatically or by hand. An additional manual valve on the top of the envelope could be used to completely deflate the envelope. Two long quick-release panels were also built into the envelope for emergency deflation. The gas bag had three ballonets, one at the front, one in the centre and one at the rear: the front and rear ballonets could be used to fly the airship up or down. Two centrifugal fans were used to inflate the ballonets. Small fixed vertical and horizontal stabilisers were mounted at the rear of the envelope.

Suspended below the envelope a diamond-section keel constructed from steel tubing extended nearly the whole length of the envelope. This contained a horizontal stabilising surface for the front two-thirds of its length: the rear part also had a fixed vertical surface. It carried two pairs of elevators, one pair forward and the other aft, and a single rear-mounted rudder. Below this the car, also made from steel tubes was suspended. This had a single landing pivot in the bow. and was divided into compartments and could carry 20 persons. Also inside the car were two Panhard four-cylinder water-cooled piston engines rated at 135 hp, driving a pair of two-bladed pusher propellers through clutches and a gearbox. The propellers, which rotated in opposite directions, were 16 ft 5in (5 m) in diameter and revolved at about one third of the engines' speed.

== Operational history ==
The airship made its first flight on 14 September 1910 and this was followed by a series of test flights before it was formally accepted by the Army.

=== Delivery flight ===
The Morning Post left Moisson on delivery to Farnborough at 10:15 in the morning of 26 October 1910, carrying eight people including the pilot Louis Capazza and three passengers: the designer Henri Julliot, the newly appointed commander of the Army Balloon School Major Sir A. Bannerman, and a representative of The Morning Post. By two o'clock it had reached Brighton on the English southern coast, it then travelled north over Horsham towards Aldershot. It soon approached North Camp at Farnborough for an attempted landing on the common close to the Army Balloon Works. Due to the strong winds it took a number of approaches to the common before troops managed to grab the ropes and secure the airship. The airship was towed to a balloon works shed specially built to house it. It was soon realised it would be a close fit but as it had been measured to fit for the Morning Post all that was required was that care was taken in moving the airship into the shed. With all but ten feet inside the shed, a large hiss was heard as the envelope had caught on a girder. A number of troops were under the airship as it collapsed but nobody was hurt.

=== Final flight ===
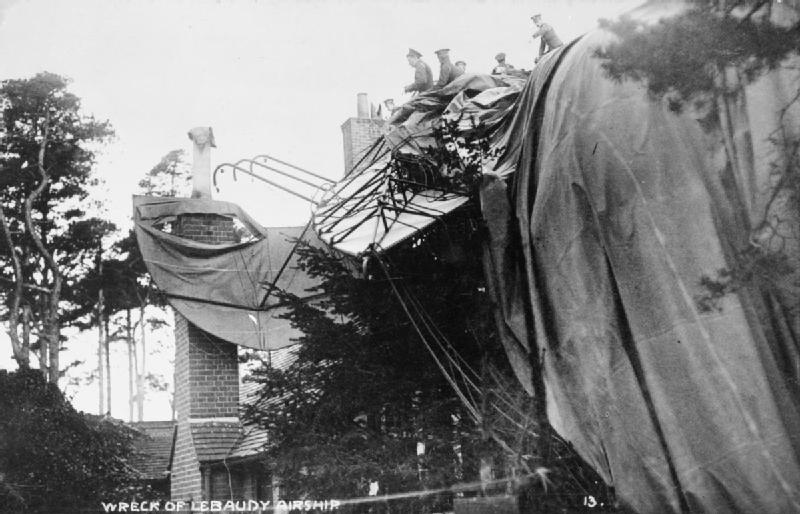
Wreck of the Morning Post at Farnborough

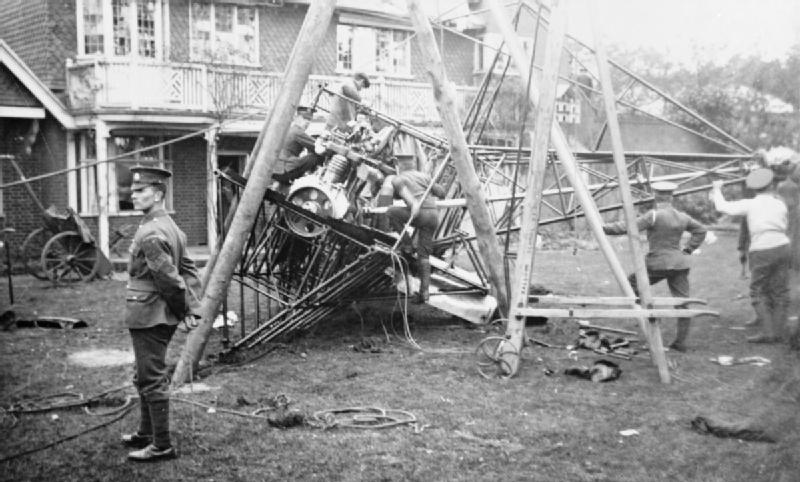

On 4 May 1911 the Morning Post was on its first flight since being damaged in October 1910 when it was delivered. The airship with a crew of seven was at the end of the one-hour trial flight, it had deployed ropes to allow the soldiers on the ground to bring the ship to the ground, the men could not hold it. The airship drifted into some trees and the envelope burst, causing the airship to collapse over the trees and a house. One of the French mechanics was badly burned but all the crew were rescued from the debris.

== Specifications ==
Data from

General characteristics

- Capacity: 20
- Length: 337 ft 10 in (103 m)
- Diameter: 39 ft 4 in (12 m)
- Volume: 353,168 cu ft (10,000.6 m^{3})
- Powerplant: 2 × Panhard & Levassor 4M 4-cyl. in-line water-cooled piston engines, 135 hp (101 kW) each
- Propellers: 2-bladed 2x Chauvière Integrale, 16 ft 5 in (5.00 m) diameter (two propeller shafts driven by one engine)

== See also ==
Related lists

- List of airship accidents
