= Chalais-Meudon =

French aeronautical research and development centre

- Meudon; Near Paris in France
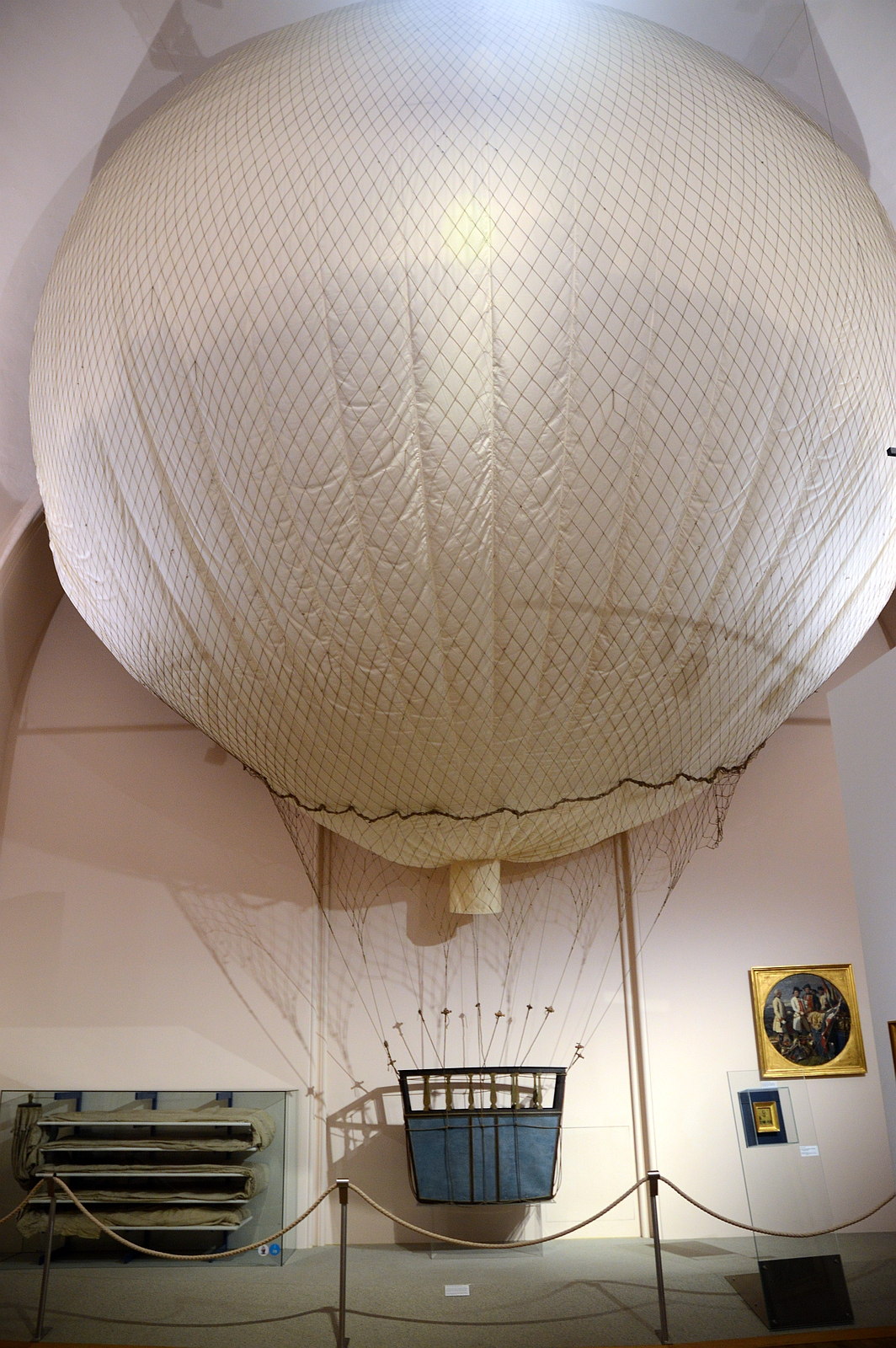
- L'Intrépide, one of the first observation balloons produced at Château de Meudon.

Site information
- Type: Military aeronautical research and development centre
- Owner: Ministry of Armed Forces
- Operator: ONERA
- Open to the public: No

Location
- Chalais-Meudon Chalais-Meudon (Paris and inner ring)
- Coordinates: 48°48′01″N 02°14′09″E

Site history
- Built: 1877

Garrison information
- Designations: 2 buildings designated Historic Monuments

Chalais-Meudon is an aeronautical research and development centre in Meudon, to the south-west of Paris. It was originally founded in 1793 in the nearby Château de Meudon and has played an important role in the development of French aviation. Starting with the development and production of balloons, the site has been a centre of aviation development, mainly, but not exclusively for military applications, ever since. Many famous French aircraft designers and engineers worked here or used its resources, such as hangars, wind tunnels, and laboratories to further their activities, and the site continues as an aerospace research hub into the 21st century.

The site was the original home of the world's first aviation museum, now known as the Musée de l'air et de l'espace at Paris–Le Bourget Airport.

== History ==
=== Balloons ===
The story of aviation at Chalais-Meudon starts in October 1793 when the French Committee of Public Safety ordered the construction of an observation balloon capable of carrying two observers. The old royal grounds at Meudon were allocated for this work, with the Château de Meudon chosen as the centre, with Nicolas-Jacques Conté as director. Two French Balloon Corps balloon companies had already been created, and the new organisation's role was to build balloons and train their pilots and operators.

The first balloon, the Entreprenant, was built within four months, and on 31 October 1794, the National School of Ballooning was created, with Conté as its director. Many other balloons were then built in a short period, including, in 1795, l’Intrépide which, with the First Balloon Company, was captured by Austrian troops in 1796, and is now on display at the Austrian Military Museum in Vienna - the oldest aircraft in Europe. They were all spherical hydrogen balloons with a diameter of at least 10 metres (33 ft). Conté himself had improved production methods for hydrogen and the treatment of the gas bags.

In 1798 Napoleon sent one of the balloon companies in one ship to Egypt. It was sunk by the British at Aboukir and all the equipment was lost. The two balloon companies were disbanded soon afterwards, and work on balloons at Meudon ceased.

In 1877, balloons had regained their importance after their successful use in the Siege of Paris (1870–71). Léon Gambetta, the Minister for War, who had himself escaped from Paris by balloon, created a commission of air communications, and Colonel Charles Renard was put in charge of military ballooning. In 1877, he became director of the l'Etablissement Central de l'Aérostation Militaire (Central Establishment of Military Ballooning), and he created corps of balloonists, with a research centre at Meudon.

This was a new development in the grounds of the château and on the edge of the forest of Meudon. It included a hexagonal lake, the Étang de Chalais, hence the location was named Chalais-Meudon. A large series of buildings was planned. It included the Research Laboratory for Military Ballooning which became the Military Aeronautical Laboratory.

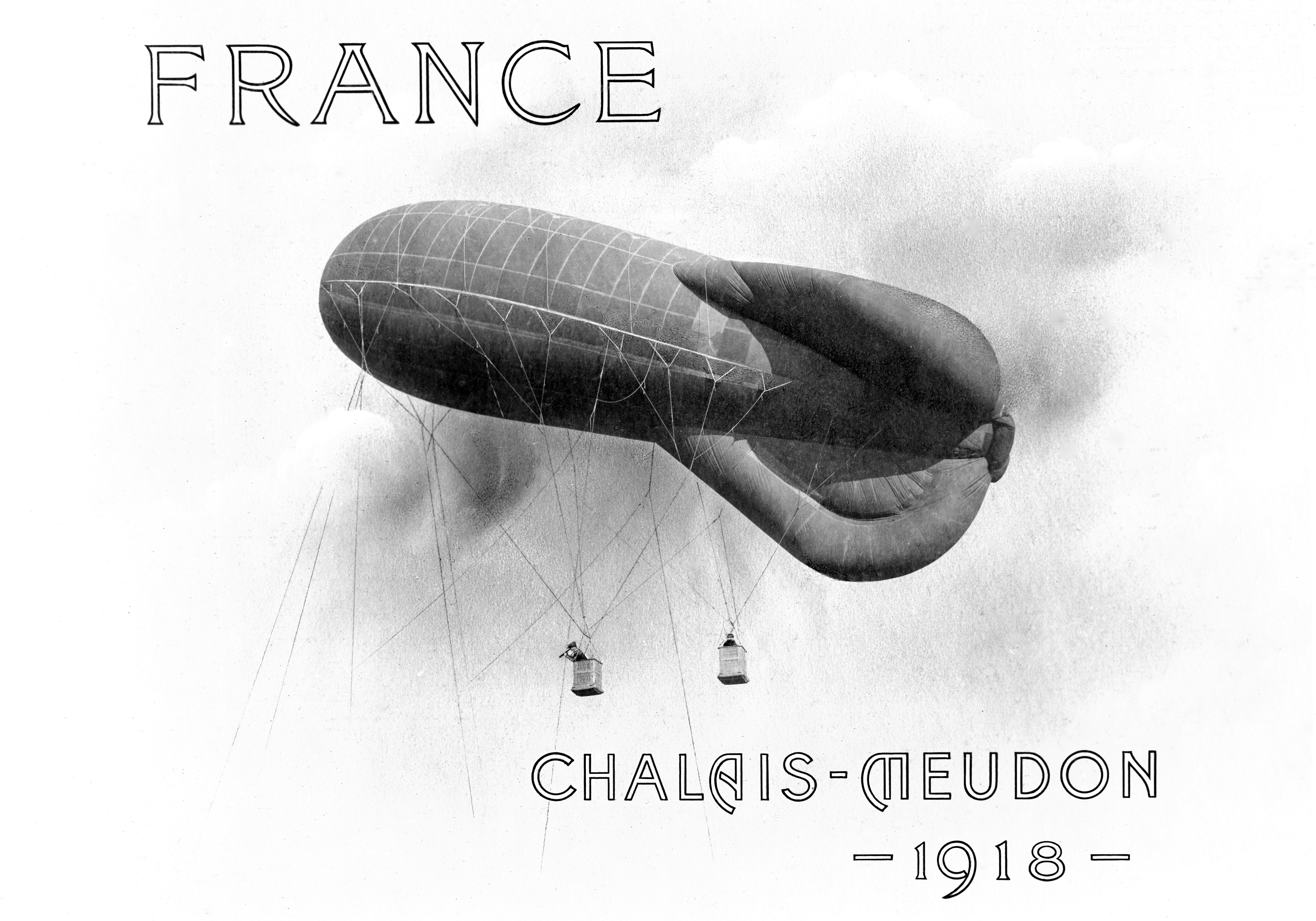
A Caquot balloon at Chalais-Meudon, 1918

The Universal Exhibition in Paris in 1878 had a huge Great Gallery of Machines, designed by Henri de Dion. Renard brought the structure to Chalais-Meudon for use as a balloon store and workshop. It was named Hangar Y (all buildings at the site were allocated a letter) and the building nearest to it, which was used for the production of hydrogen, was named Building Z. Hangar Y has dimensions of: length 70 m (230 ft), width 41 m (135 ft), height 26 m (85 ft).

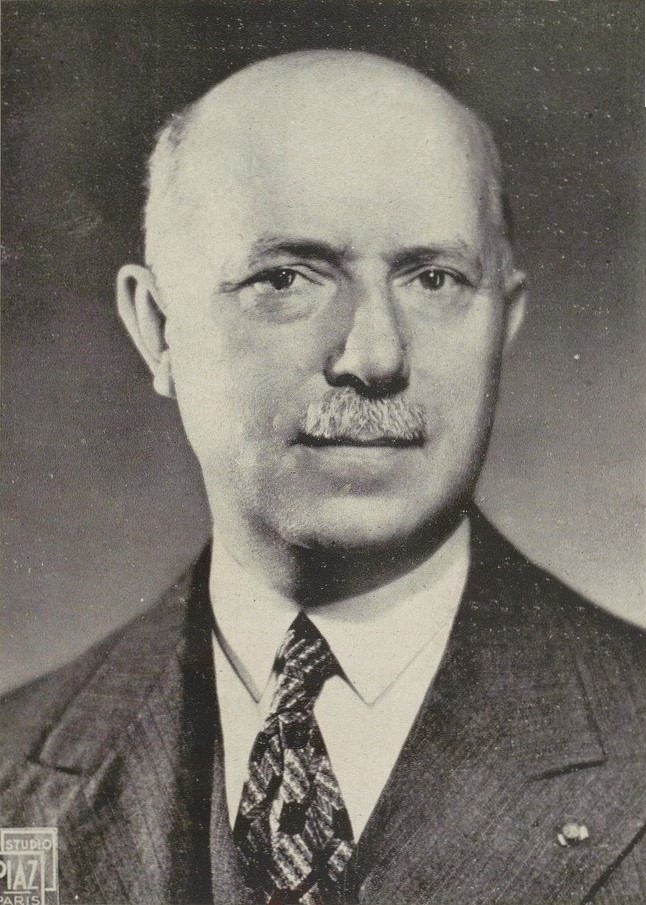
Albert Caquot c. 1948

Balloons continued to be developed and built here, with great expansion of balloon manufacturing during World War I. Balloon parks were created, with steam winches used to move the balloons, and most of the components were built on site, including wicker baskets and hydrogen generators. Especially important at that time were the Caquot kite balloons, produced for all the allied countries. The designer, Albert Caquot went on to plan the Chalais-Meudon wind tunnel and to propose the aviation museum (see below). Balloon production ended in 1918.

=== Airships ===
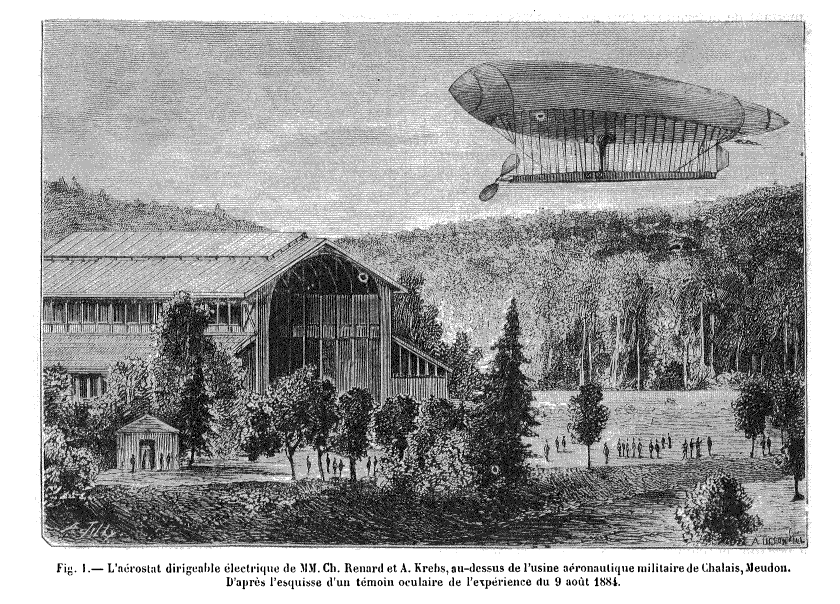
The La France airship above Hangar Y on its first flight, 1884

Hangar Y was at first used for balloons, but Renard soon started work on airships, which the building could also accommodate. This was therefore the world's first airship hangar, and one of very few that remain in Europe.

The first airship to be built was La France. In building it, Renard collaborated with Arthur Constantin Krebs, one of France's most notable inventors. Its first flight was on 9 August 1884. Taking off from outside Hangar Y, it flew over Villacoublay before returning and landing safely at its takeoff point, a flight of about 8 kilometres (5.0 miles) taking 23 minutes. This was the first ever fully controlled closed-circuit flight by a flying machine. It was propelled by an electric motor, but the batteries were so heavy that even the designers recognised that it was, at the time, a dead end, and after a further six successful flights, its development was abandoned.

Another airship was built here in 1895, named the Général Meusnier after Jean Baptiste Meusnier who had a concept for a dirigible balloon in 1784. Neither project flew.

There was a lot of airship activity in the early 20th century. In 1901 Alberto Santos-Dumont based his Number 6 airship here. Many airships visited for demonstrations or testing, including those from the Lebaudy brothers. Their Patrie was here in 1906–7, followed by La République in 1908–9.

==== Airships built by the Military Airship Factory 1912 - 1918 ====
Data from

| Name | Year | Envelope capacity | Length | Width | Notes |
|---|---|---|---|---|---|
| Fleurus I (CB.V) | 1912 | 6,500 m^{3} (230,000 cu ft) | 77 m (252 ft) | 12 m (41 ft) | Clément-Bayard designed the motor and the gondola, hence the CB designation. Conducting a reconnaissance mission on 9-10 August 1914, it became the first Allied aircraft to fly over Germany during World War I. |
| Fleurus II Lorriane | 1915 | 10,000 m^{3} (370,000 cu ft) | 93 m (305 ft) | 15 m (50 ft) | |
| Fleurus III Tunisie | 1916 | 10,000 m^{3} (370,000 cu ft) | 93 m (305 ft) | 15 m (50 ft) | |
| T-1 | 1916 | 5,500 m^{3} (194,000 cu ft) | 70 m (230 ft) | 14 m (46 ft) | |
| T-2 CM.14 Capitaine Caussin | 1917 | 8,800 m^{3} (312,000 cu ft) | 81 m (267 ft) | 14 m (46 ft) | Used by the US Navy, after WWI moved to the USA but never flown there. |
| CM.1 to CM.4 | 1917-8 | 5,400 m^{3} (190,000 cu ft) | | | Used by French Navy. |
| CM.5 | 1918 | 7,400 m^{3} (260,000 cu ft) | 80.0 m (262.5 ft) | 14 m (45 ft) | Sold to the US Navy and completed after the Armistice. An engine survives in a museum. |

The army found that airships were becoming decreasingly useful during WWI, and on 1 January 1918 all airships were transferred to the navy. Construction and delivery of the CM series for the navy was completed, but CM.6 to CM.8 had also been ordered, but were not built.

The last airship to use Hangar Y was the Voliris 900. This modern commercial airship, 31 metres (102 ft) long, was assembled, inflated and given a public presentation here in 2002. It was then dismantled and moved to Clermont-Ferrand for flight testing the following year.

=== Kites ===
Émile Dorand was a balloonist and engineer, who had been at Chalais-Meudon since 1907 and was appointed head of the Military Aeronautical Laboratory. After that closed, he was appointed as the first director of the Service Technique de l'Aéronautique (STAé) on 28 February 1916. This was still based at Chalais-Meudon, and he continued with one of his interests – kites.

He had developed ever-larger kites, capable of supporting a man, and some were powered, with a nacelle (fuselage structure) which was suspended underneath large wings, and which had a steerable engine and propeller at the front. While these showed some promise, and kites were being used by the army, the concepts were being overtaken by other ideas, so the interest in kites only lasted from around 1908 to 1916, by when all kite equipment had been returned to Chalais-Meudon, never to be used again.

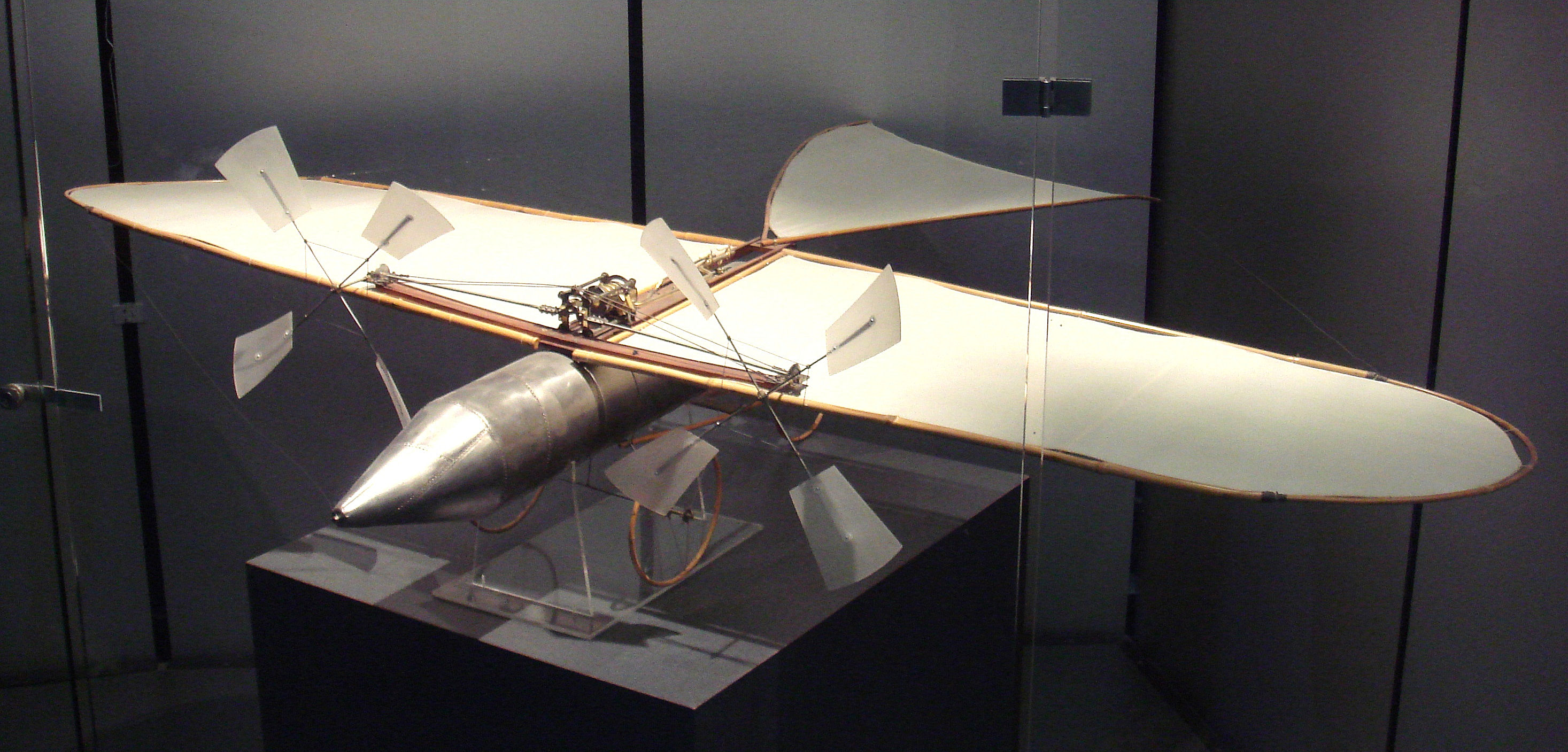
Victor Tatin's model aeroplane, 1879. The fuselage was the air tank.

=== Aircraft ===
One of the earliest experiments with aeroplanes at Chalais-Meudon was conducted by Victor Tatin who in 1879 developed a model monoplane, with a wing span of 1.9 m (6 ft 3 in), powered by a compressed air engine. Tied to a central pole in a circular track it took off and flew for about 15 metres (49 ft) entirely under its own power - the first model aeroplane ever to do so.

From 1902 to 1905 Renard invited several aviation experimenters to have devices built or tested at Chalais-Meudon. They included Léon Levavasseur, Ernest Archdeacon and Ferdinand Ferber. In 1910 the laboratory acquired around 20 aircraft and started training military pilots. More facilities for research and testing were installed, including test benches and wind tunnels.

Marcel Bloch worked at the laboratory during World War I, developing a propeller named the Éclair and, with Henry Potez who was the Dorand's assistant at the STAé, and Louis Coroller, formed a company, the Société d'Études Aéronautiques to produce the SEA series of fighters. On 12 January 1918 Commander Caquot replaced Colonel Durand as director of the STAé.

At the end of WWI the STAé itself moved to the Issy-les-Moulineaux, about 2.9 miles (4.7 km) to the north-east of Chalais-Meudon, taking some of the research activities with it, but retaining some activities at Chalais-Meudon. Its activities continued between the wars, but with only a small flying field available much of the aircraft testing was moved to the nearby Villacoublay airfield about 2.3 miles (3.7 km) to the south-west, and the rest of the aircraft testing, and some other research activities went to Issy.

During the occupation of World War II, German researchers used the facilities, including the Great Wind Tunnel, for testing their own aircraft and interesting captured French designs such as the Payen PA-22.

In 1946, the engine testing service moved back to Chalais-Meudon and became the Centre d'Essai des Moteurs et Hélices (CEMH).

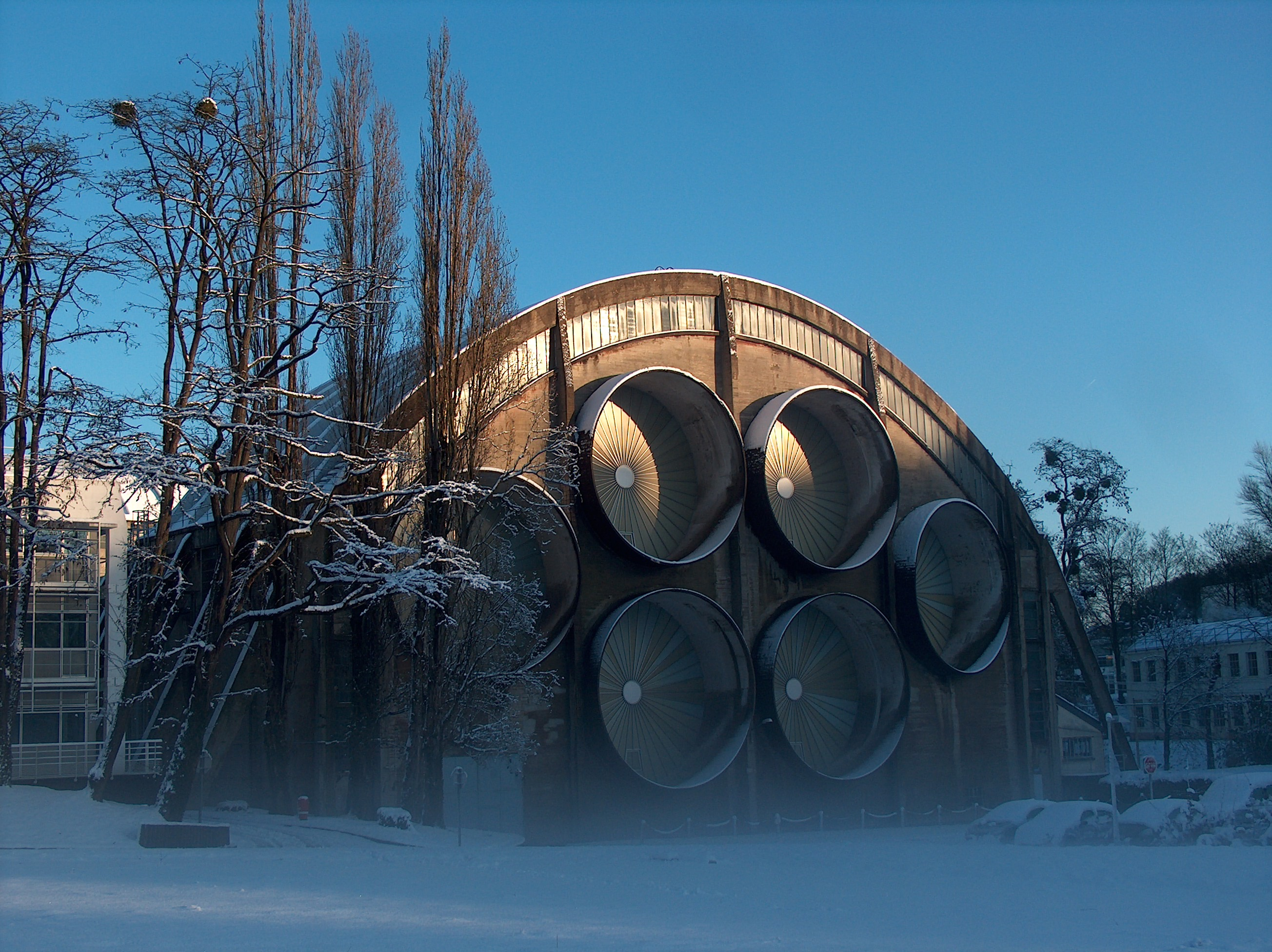
The Great Wind Tunnel at Chalais-Meudon in 2010

=== Wind Tunnel ===
In 1929 Albert Caquot began planning for what was then the largest wind tunnel in the world. It was designed by Antonin Lapresle, who was a colleague of Gustave Eiffel who had built two wind tunnels with great success in Paris in 1909 and 1912. Building started in 1932 and it was completed in 1934. It was capable of testing complete aircraft up to 12 m (39 ft 4 in) span. Built of reinforced concrete, it was powered by six fans of 1,000 hp (750 kW) each, and airspeeds could reach 180 km/h (110 mph).

Named the S1Ch wind tunnel, and also called La Grande Soufflerie (The Great Wind Tunnel), it has been used for testing cars and buildings, as well as aircraft including the Dassault Mirage III, the Caravelle and Concorde. It closed in 1977 and is preserved as a historic monument.

=== Museum ===
In 1919, Albert Caquot proposed the setting up of an aeronautical museum, and items were collected at Issy-les-Moulineaux and at Chalais-Meudon, with many items preserved from the balloon, engine and aviation activities that had taken place at those locations. The items were soon gathered into the balloon basket hangar at Chalais-Meudon, which opened to the public in 1921. The Musée de l’Air was the world's first aviation museum, and the collection constantly grew.

After WWII the decision was made to move the crowded museum to larger premises. With the building of the Charles de Gaulle Airport at Roissy, Le Bourget Airport had an increasing amount of space available, and the collection was gradually moved there. The process started in the early 1970s, and the new museum opened to the public in 1975. The Chalais-Meudon museum was finally closed in 1981. Now renamed the Musée de l’Air et de l’Espace, it continues to thrive at Le Bourget.

== Modern use ==
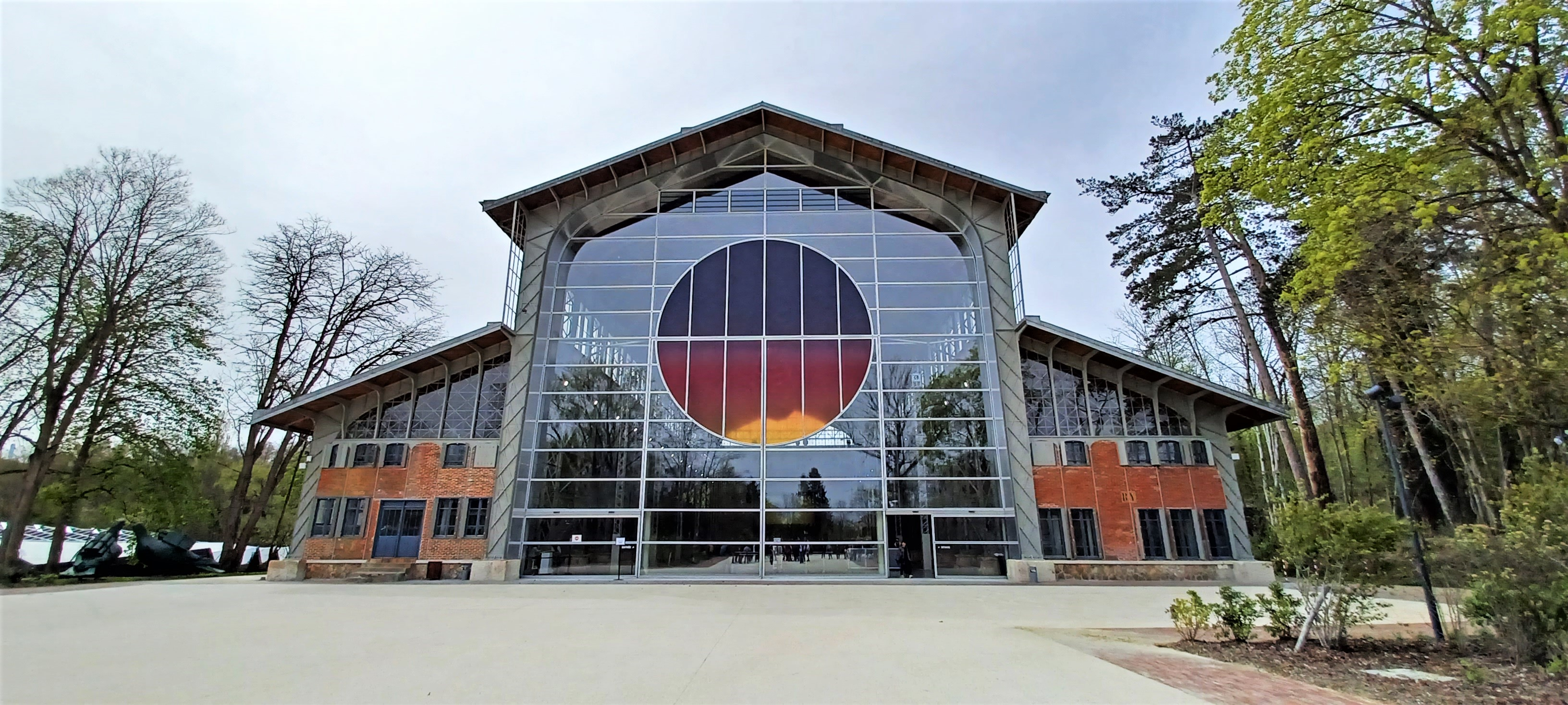
Hangar Y in 2024, after restoration.

In 1946, the STAé was replaced by the Office National d'Etudes et de Recherches Aérospatiales (ONERA), and it took over most of the Chalais-Meudon site, where it remains to this day.

Hangar Y was designated a historic monument in 1982, but fell into disrepair. It has now been renovated and in 2023 reopened as a visitor and cultural centre.
