= La République (airship) =

1900s French airship

République
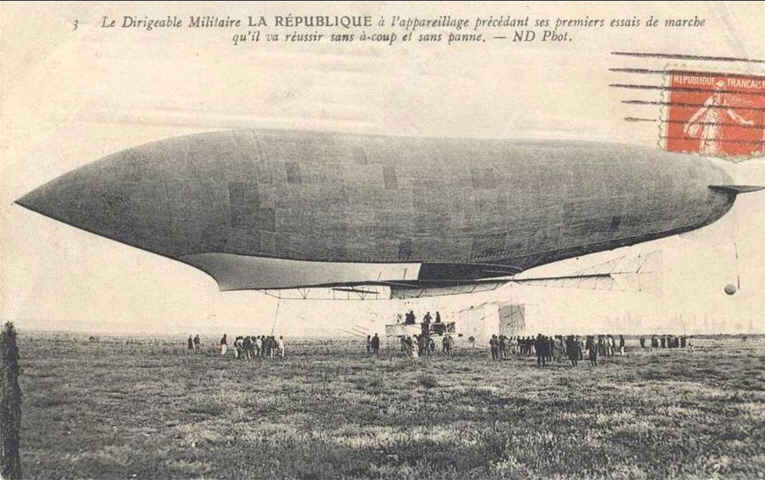

General information
- Type: Military reconnaissance airship
- National origin: France
- Manufacturer: Lebaudy Frères, Moisson, France
- Designer: Henri Julliot
- Status: crashed 25 September 1909
- Number built: 1

History
- First flight: 24 June 1908

Lebaudy République (later known as La République) was a semi-rigid airship built for the French army in Moisson, France, by sugar manufacturers Lebaudy Frères. She was a sister ship of the airship Patrie, the main differences between the two being in the dimensions of the gasbag (or 'envelope') and the ballonet. Although she was operationally successful, République crashed in 1909 due to a mechanical failure, killing all four crew members.

== Background ==
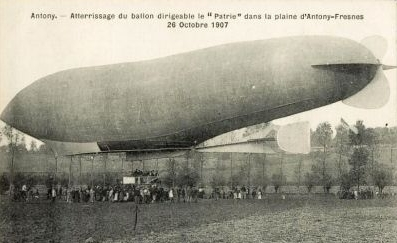
Patrie landing on the plain at Antony-Fresnes, 26 October 1907

République's predecessor, the airship Patrie, had been so successful that three further airships of the same design were ordered by the French government in March 1907. Two of them saw service under the names République and Liberté. The République was completed in June 1908, flew for the first time on 24 June, and was handed over to the French army on 31 July of that year.

Other governments had been equally impressed, and the Russian and Austrian armies each ordered an airship of the same design. The Russie and Lebed saw service in Russia, and the Autrichienne (built under license in Vienna by the Motor-Luftfahrzeug Gesellschaft) was operated by the Austrian army under the designation M.II.

== Design and development ==
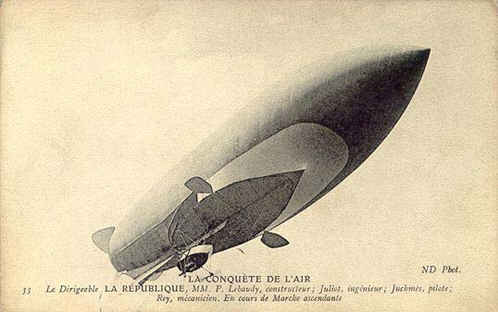
The République in Moisson, June/July 1908

The main structural components of the République, like those of the Patrie, was the gasbag, a nickel-steel frame (or keel), and a gondola suspended from the frame on steel cables. Contained within the envelope was a ballonet, which ensured that sufficient gas pressure was maintained in the envelope at all times, irrespective of the degree of expansion or contraction of the lifting gas. These components were essentially the same as for the Patrie, the only differences initially being in the dimensions of the envelope and the ballonet. The modular structure enabled the envelope volume to be varied without affecting the keel or the gondola.

== Operational history ==
=== First flight ===
The République's first flight took place at the Lebaudy base at Moisson on 24 June, 1908. She was flown to Chalais-Meudon to take up her station on 31 July 1908.

=== Military operations ===
During the autumn of 1908 and the spring and summer of 1909, the République was engaged in two peacetime campaigns from her base at the airship headquarters at Chalais-Meudon. She trained pilots and the support team that also assessed the airship's capabilities. These test flights included a long flight on 4 August 1909, during which she covered 130 miles (209 km) in 6 hours.

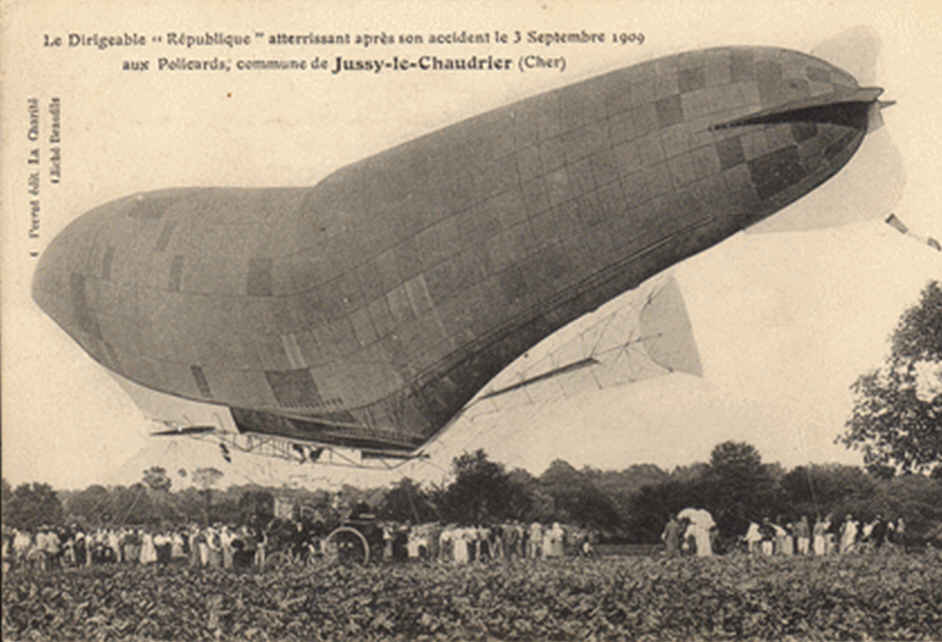
The damaged République prepares to land at Jussy-le-Chaudrier on 3 September 1909 after her engine overheated.

In 1909, the army decided to integrate airship reconnaissance into its military maneuvers of that year ("Les grandes Manoeuvres du Bourbonnais") and the République was assigned to this task. A temporary hangar, consisting of a fabric skin draped over a metal frame, was constructed at Lapalisse to accommodate the airship. On 3 September 1909, the République set off from Chalais-Meudon for the flight to Lapalisse. After 62 miles (105 km), while over La Charité-sur-Loire, her motor overheated due to poor water circulation and had to be stopped immediately. With the engine shut off, the crew had to land in poor conditions at Policards, in Jussy-le-Chaudrier.

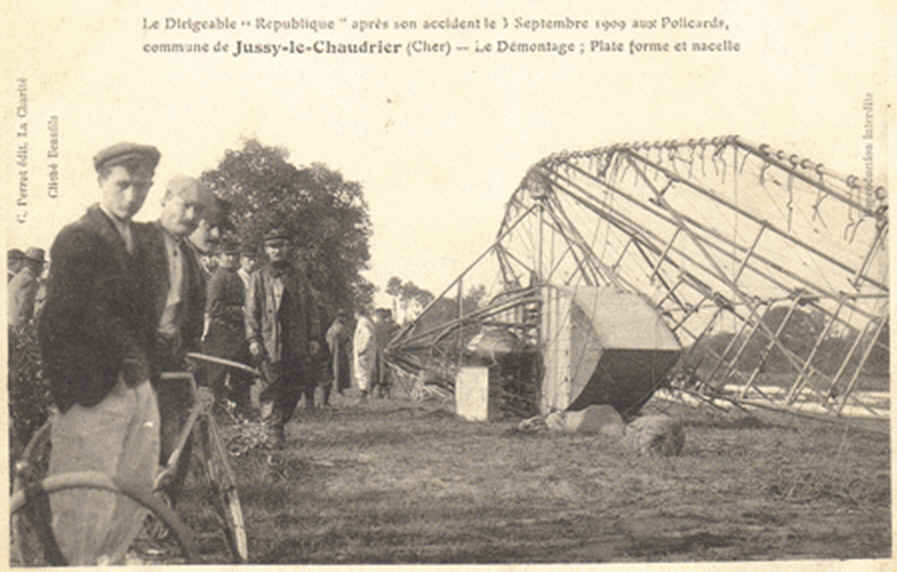
The République's gondola and keel lie in a field at Jussy-le-Chaudrier, 3 September 1909

Local farm workers who saw the accident caught her guide ropes but were unable to prevent the gondola from impaling itself on an apple tree, damaging the airship's keel and gondola in several places. With the keel and gondola damaged and the loss of gas, it was decided not to risk the République suffering the same fate as the Patrie (who was lost when a storm blew her away while she was moored due to mechanical problems), but to deflate the gas-bag immediately. The gondola and keel were sent on to Lapalisse for repairs and the envelope was returned for repairs to Chalais-Meudon. The necessary repairs were made sufficiently quickly for the République to be reassembled and inflated, ready to take part successfully in the maneuvers by 12 September 1909 as planned.

=== Final flight ===
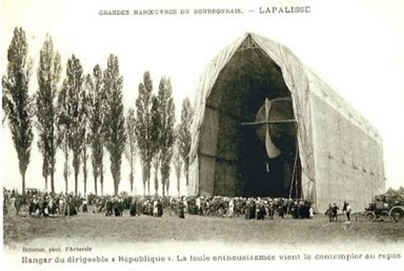
The République in its field hangar at Lapalisse, France, after reinflation in September 1909

After the exercise, the crew decided to fly her back to Chalais-Meudon, rather than have her deflated and dismantled for the return journey by rail. On the morning of 25 September 1909 while near the Château of Avrilly (46°38′34.01″N 3°16′57.98″E), one of the metal propeller blades sheared off its shaft and pierced the envelope, deflating the bag catastrophically, and caused the République to crash into ground at high speed. All four crew members were killed: Captain. Marchal, Lieutenant. Chauré, and 'Adjudants Mecaniciens', Vincenot and Réau.

== Epilogue ==
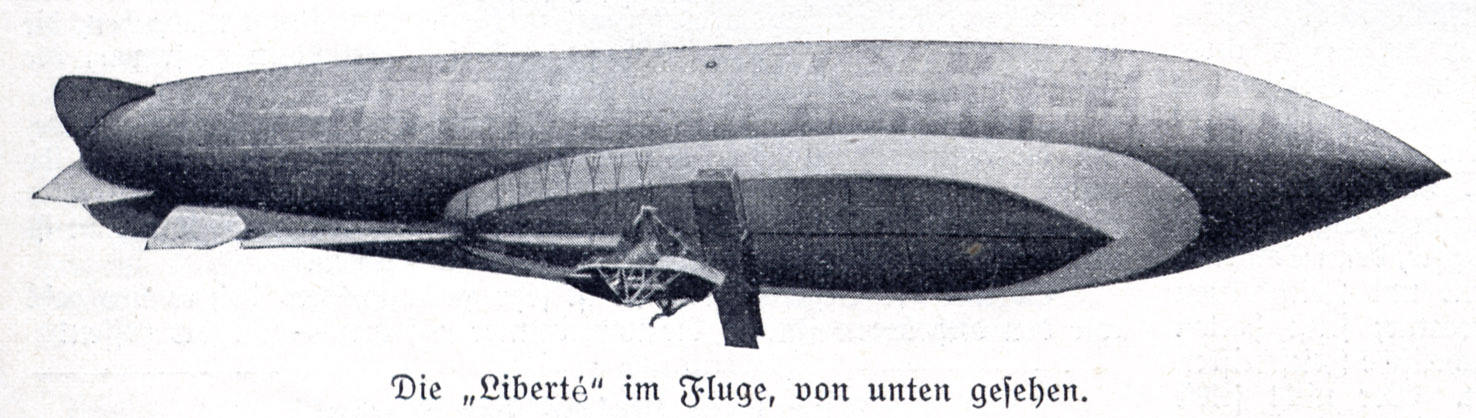
Airship Liberté

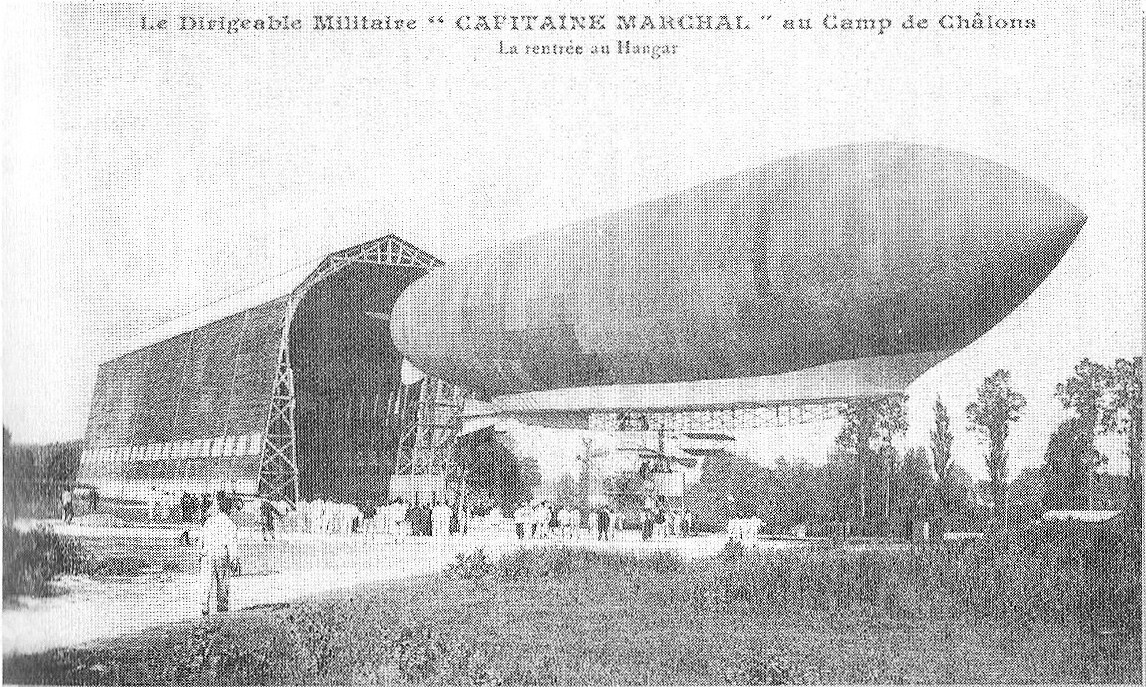
Capitaine Marchal (airship)

The French government took immediate steps to replace the République, ordering two airships to replace her. The République's sister-ship, the Liberté, already under construction, was modified by the addition of a second engine following the loss of the République. She was to be based at the garrison of Belfort.

A new airship, named Capitaine-Marchal, in honor of the deceased commander of the République, was presented to the French government by Lebaudy Frères.

After the accident, criticism was voiced that the aircraft should not have been allowed to fly and regarding the design of the airship's propellers, which was addressed in the order for replacement propellers.

Opinions such as those expressed by The New York Times was that the "War Dirigibles Must Yield to the Aeroplane," reflecting a growing awareness of the relative potentials of aeroplanes over airships. However, all major powers continued to invest in military airships for some years. Airships were to be used throughout most of World War I, before their vulnerability to improved heavier-than-air aircraft led to their being abandoned for military purposes.

== Specifications ==
Data from D'Orcy's Airship Manual, 1917 pp.83–85.

General characteristics

- Crew: 4
- Length: 61 m (200 ft 2 in)
- Diameter: 10.9 m (35 ft 9 in)
- Volume: 3,700 m^{3} (130,000 cu ft)
  Ballonet volume: 730 m^{3} (25,649 cu.ft)
- Useful lift: 1,260 kg (2,780 lb)
- Powerplant: 1 × Panhard-Levassor petrol, 52 kW (70 hp)
- Propellers: 2 x 2-bladed (two propeller shafts driven by one engine)

Performance

- Maximum speed: 50 km/h (31 mph, 27 kn)
- Endurance: 7h 15min

== See also ==
Aircraft of comparable role, configuration, and era

- Lebaudy Patrie

Related lists

- List of airship accidents
