= Patrie (airship) =

1900s French airship

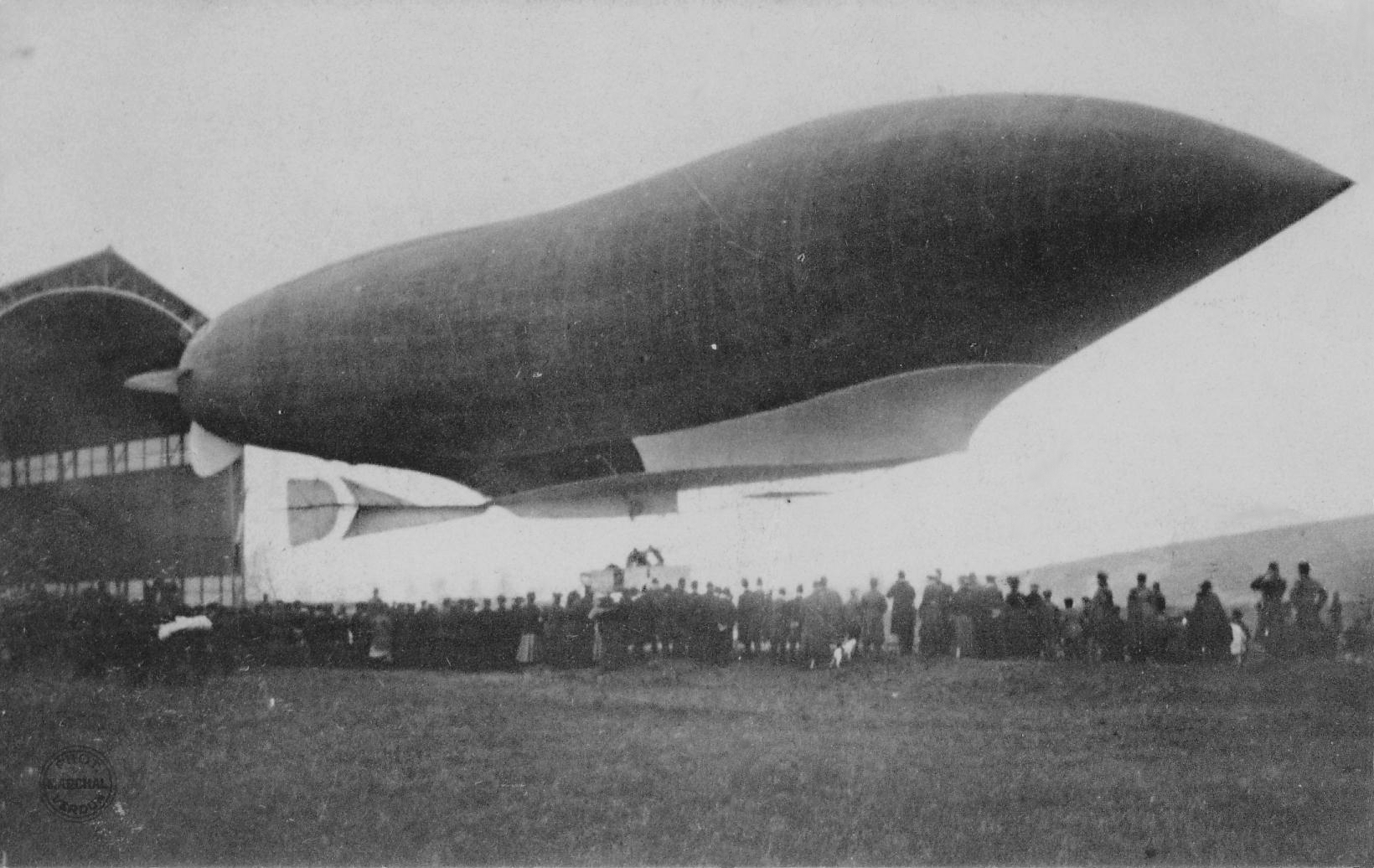
- The Patrie leaving her hangar at Verdun for the final time, 29 November 1907.

General information
- Type: Military reconnaissance airship
- National origin: France
- Manufacturer: Lebaudy Frères, Moisson, France
- Designer: Henri Julliot
- Number built: 1

History
- First flight: 16 November 1906

The Lebaudy Patrie was a semi-rigid airship built for the French army in Moisson, France, by sugar producers Lebaudy Frères. Designed by Henri Julliot, Lebaudy's chief engineer, the Patrie was completed in November 1906 and handed over to the French army the following month. The Patrie bears the distinction of being the first airship built specifically for military service.

In 1907, from her base at Chalais-Meudon near Paris, a successful series of military manoeuvres was conducted with the airship by the military command, which included a visit by France's President of the Council Georges Clemenceau. Following the successful completion of these operations, in November 1907 the Patrie was transferred under her own power to her operational base at Verdun, near the German border.

On 29 November 1907, the Patrie became stranded in Souhesmes, due to a mechanical fault. The following day, a storm rolled in and the Patrie was torn loose from her makeshift moorings and, despite the efforts of some 200 soldiers who tried to restrain the airship, she was carried away by the high winds and lost from sight. Had the rope to the emergency gas-release system been attached, her loss could possibly have been avoided. After being blown across the English Channel and passing unseen over England during the night, the Patrie was sighted over Wales and Ireland on 1 December. The airship made a brief landfall near Belfast, before rising again to be blown out over the Atlantic Ocean. She was last sighted by the crew of a steamship off the Hebrides and was never seen again.

Despite the loss of the Patrie, the Lebaudy Brothers went on to complete a sister-ship, the République, for the French Army. Several airships of a similar design to the Patrie were ordered and delivered to export customers, including Russia and Austro-Hungarian Empire.

== Development ==
The military uses of airships at the time were considered to be the dropping of bombs (from an altitude at which they were deemed to be out of range of ground-based weapons) and reconnaissance. M. Julliot, the designer of the Patrie, stated that "each of the French ships can carry thirty, and on short journeys, even fifty torpedoes of 10 kilogrammes (22 lb) each." For reconnaissance purposes the Patrie was equipped with "a mounting for a telephotographic apparatus, and for a 100-candlepower acetylene searchlight". A contemporary author related that "from a height of 4,000 feet (1,200 m) the Patrie observed the smallest movements of formed bodies of troops at the Satory camp and obtained very clear telephotographs of them."

Semi-rigid airships were considered more suitable for military use because, unlike rigid airships, they could be deflated, stored and transported by land or by sea. The Patrie was a semi-rigid airship manufactured by the French sugar magnates Paul and Pierre Lebaudy and designed by their chief engineer, Henri Julliot. She was the second Lebaudy airship, and "surpassed her predecessor in both size and method of construction". The company's first airship, simply known as the Lebaudy, and dubbed by the French public "Le Jaune" ("The Yellow (One)") because of the yellow colour of the lead chromate paint on its cloth exterior, was considered the most successful airship then in operation.

== Design ==
=== Overview ===
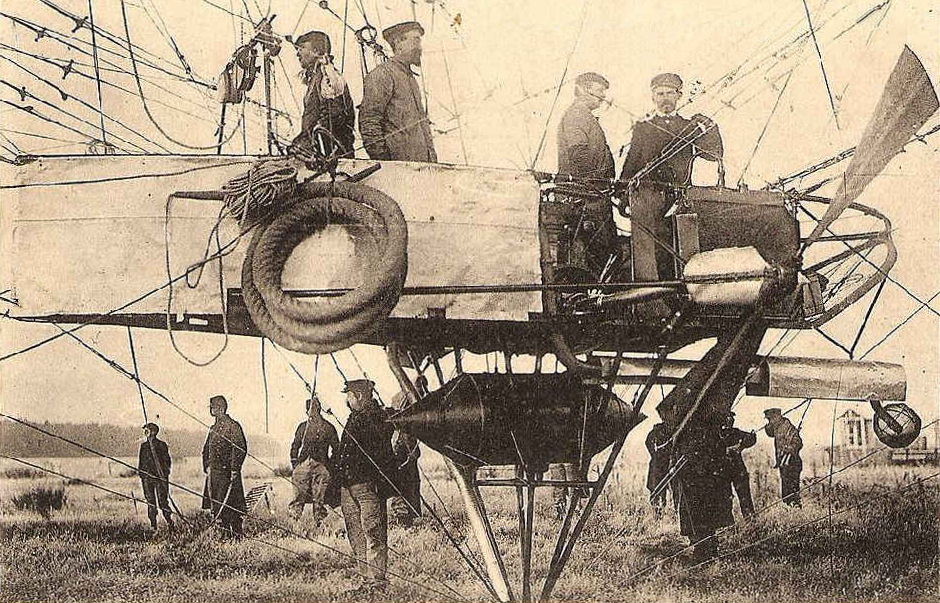
Close-up of the Patrie's gondola in 1906, showing fuel tank and the propeller

The main structural components of the Patrie, like those of its predecessor, were the envelope (or "gas-bag"), a nickel-steel frame or keel, and a gondola suspended from the frame on steel cables. Contained within the envelope was a ballonet, the function of which was to ensure that sufficient gas pressure was maintained in the envelope at all times, irrespective of the degree of expansion or contraction of the lifting gas. Attached to both the gas-bag and the gondola were active and passive control surfaces to provide lateral and vertical stability and to give the pilot directional control over the airship.

The gondola, constructed of nickel-steel tubing, was suspended some 3.4 meters (11 feet) below an elliptical steel frame (or keel) attached to the bottom of the gas-bag, under the centre of lift. Between the frame and the envelope and linking the two was a small hemp net. The net was attached by wooden toggles to a canvas band sewn directly onto the envelope, and the frame was attached to the net by further toggles. This permitted the easy removal of the frame from the envelope. The frame itself could also be dismantled for ease of transport.

The open gondola offered the crew and passengers little protection from the elements. It was common for there to have been two pilots, two engineers and two passengers on board during test flights and military missions. Ballast, in the form of 10- and 20-pound (4.5 and 9.1 kg) bags of sand, could be jettisoned through a pipe set into the floor of the gondola. Other equipment included "a 'siren' speaking trumpet, carrier pigeons, iron pins, ropes for anchoring the airship, a reserve supply of fuel and water, and a fire extinguisher".

=== Envelope and ballonet ===
The Patrie's envelope was composed of four alternating layers of cotton cloth and vulcanised rubber (the envelope of its predecessor, the Jaune, comprised three layers). The outside layer was of cotton cloth, covered with lead chromate to prevent the actinic components of sunlight from destroying the rubber skin which formed the second layer. This second layer prevented leakage of the hydrogen lifting gas from the envelope. The third layer was of cotton, which was protected by the rubber fourth and final layer from damage caused by the hydrogen. This final rubber layer was thinner, and therefore lighter, than the first. The rubber sheeting for the second and fourth layers was supplied by the German company Continental AG.

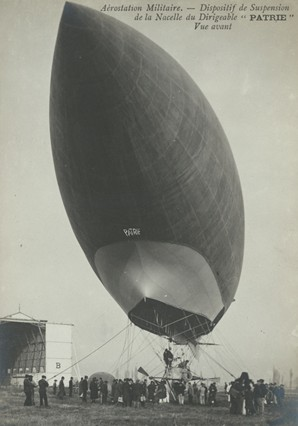
The Patrie in Moisson, 1906

The lead chromate gave the envelope the same mustard-yellow colour as its precessor, "Le Jaune"; the remaining surfaces were coloured sky-blue, as is evident in a contemporary artist's impression of the Patrie.

The Patrie's design as a semi-rigid airship required that the pressure of both the lifting gas in the gas-bag and the air in the ballonet be sufficient to maintain the airship's overall shape. Sufficient hydrogen was pumped into the gas-bag to enable the airship to ascend to its intended maximum operating altitude of 1 mile (1,600 m), at which height the ballonet would occupy approximately one-fifth of the total gas-bag volume. Descent was made by releasing hydrogen from the gas-bag and then pumping air into the ballonet to take up the volume of the released gas, a process which was repeated incrementally until the desired rate of descent or altitude had been achieved.

To control the movement of the hydrogen and air within the envelope, the Patrie was equipped with five valves, some of which operated automatically, and others which could also be operated manually by the pilot via cords. The valves on the gas-bag released hydrogen automatically when the pressure exceeded two inches of water (inAq) (500 Pa, 0.723 psi); whereas the ballonet valves opened when the air pressure exceeded 0.78 inAq (195 Pa, 0.282 psi), thus ensuring that air was driven out of the ballonet before there was any loss of hydrogen from the gas-bag. The automatic operation of the valves was a factor in the duration of its final (unmanned) flight (see Final flight section below). The pressure in the ballonet was maintained by an engine-driven fan, for which an electrical back-up was provided so that the pressures could be maintained in the event of an engine failure or when the engine had to be switched off for maintenance purposes.

A release mechanism was provided on the gas-bag, such that, in an emergency, a pull on the attached rope would release hydrogen from the gas-bag. This rope was attached to ballast, so that it would also be activated automatically in the case of a catastrophic loss of ballast. Failure to attach this rope was to play a pivotal role in the loss of the Patrie.

Since a partially filled ballonet would cause longitudinal instability, due to the mass of air rolling fore or aft in the direction of pitch, two cloth partitions were used to divide the ballonet into three separate compartments; small holes in the partitions allowed the air to permeate gradually throughout the ballonet without affecting the stability of the airship.

=== Steering and propulsion ===
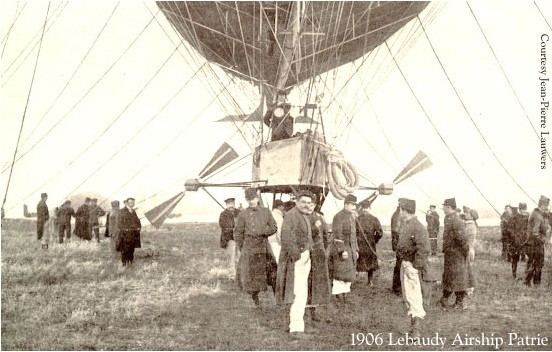
Close-up bow view of the gondola in 1906

Directional stability was achieved by four fixed vanes, two vertical and two horizontal, attached at the rear of the gas-bag, and by a long vertical vane running along the main axis of the gas-bag from the centre of the elliptical frame to its rear. Horizontal motion was controlled by the movement of a balanced rudder at the rear of an empennage on a long boom, mounted below the gas-bag and aft of the gondola (see lead image). The empennage consisted of vertical and horizontal vanes arranged like the fletching of an arrow, behind which the vertical rudder was mounted. During a refit in 1907 the vertical vanes of the empennage were modified, as is shown in the accompanying illustration.

During trials it was decided that a greater degree of control over vertical motion was required, which would also allow the pilot to compensate for "involuntary rising or falling of the airship due to expansion or contraction of the gas, or to other causes". For this purpose a movable horizontal plane was installed above the car and near the centre of gravity, which resulted in the loss of gas and ballast being reduced to a minimum.

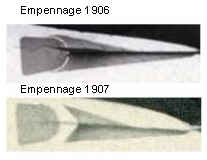
Photographs showing changes to the Patrie empennage from 1906 to 1907

At a later date this single plane was replaced by two movable planes mounted either side of and above the gondola, attached to the bottom of the elliptical frame, as shown in the plan view published in the German "Jahrbuch der Luftfahrt" ("Aviation Yearbook") in 1911. These "ailerons d'ascension et de descente" as they were referred to at the time, are clearly visible in the still photograph taken from the short film "Decollage d'un ballon dirigeable" ("The Take-off of a Dirigible Balloon"), made in Moisson by the pioneering French film-maker Alice Guy-Blaché before her emigration to the United States in March 1907.

The pilot operated the controls at the bows of the gondola, forward of the engine; the engineer controlled the engine from his position at the stern. A 52-kilowatt (70 hp) Panhard et Levassor four-cylinder engine running at 1,000 rpm, mounted centrally in the gondola, drove two 2.6-metre (8.5 ft) diameter, two-bladed steel propellers that were mounted on cantilever arms, one on each side, rotating at 1,000–1,200 rpm in opposite directions to prevent torque forces from twisting the airship. The exhaust pipe, below the rear of the gondola, was covered with metal gauze and pointed downwards to minimise the fire risk. The fuel tank, with a capacity in excess of 280 L (61.6 gal), was housed below the gondola within a pyramid of steel tubing that was designed to protect the gondola and the propellers during landing.

== Operational history ==
=== November – December 1906 ===
The first flight of the Patrie took place on 16 November 1906, at Lebaudy's Moisson headquarters, lasting 2 hours and 20 mins. After eight further test flights from Moisson, the Patrie flew the 52 kilometres (32 mi) from Moisson to the French Aeronautical Department's centre at Chalais-Meudon near Paris on 15 December 1906 at an estimated speed in excess of 45 km/h (28.1 mph). A public relations flight over the centre of Paris was undertaken on 17 December 1906, passing over the Arc de Triomphe, the Place de la Concorde, the War Ministry buildings and Les Invalides. Following this flight, Patrie was deflated until flights resumed in June 1907.

=== June – November 1907 ===
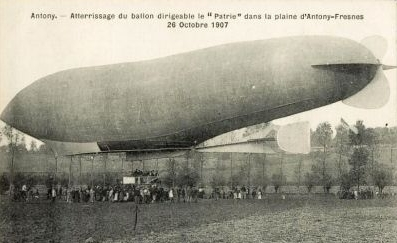
Patrie landing on the plain at Antony-Fresnes, 26 October 1907, showing changes to gas-bag

During the summer of 1907, 21 further flights were undertaken between 27 June and 7 August, including one on 22 July 1907 in which the President of the council (Prime Minister) Georges Clemenceau, and the Minister of War Georges Picquart were passengers. Although a pipe became detached, showering the Premier with hot water, he reacted nonchalantly, saying "I cannot sufficiently express my admiration for this wonderful contrivance".

The Patrie was then deflated for alterations that included the addition of a 500 cubic metre (17,660 ft³) cylindrical section to the gas-bag, the change to the empennage, and provision of new propellers.

The Patrie was reinflated and made ready for operational duty on 15 October 1907. Nine flights, totalling 18 hours, were undertaken from Chalais-Meudon between 21 October and 16 November, during one of which the left propeller was lost, causing the Patrie to ascend rapidly into the low clouds before returning safely but slowly to Chalais-Meudon under her own power. On 23 November 1907, the Patrie was flown to her operational base at Belleville-sur-Meuse near Verdun, close to the Franco-German border, a journey of 240 km (149 mi) in 6 hours 45 minutes, at an average speed of 36 km/h (22 mph) and a height of 850 metres (2,790 ft).

=== Final flight ===
While based at Verdun, the Patrie was stranded on Friday, 29 November 1907, at nearby Souhesmes due to a mechanical problem caused by the clothing of one of the mechanics becoming caught in the distributor drive gear. On-the-spot repairs were made but the lack of a spare magneto on board meant that the motor could not be used for the return flight. The decision was made not to drag the airship back to Verdun but to tether her overnight in the open at Souhesmes.

During that night, a storm blew up and approximately 200 soldiers were assigned to the task of restraining the airship in the gale-force winds. On Saturday morning, the wind was strong enough to pull some of the iron pickets anchoring the airship out of the ground so that she swung broadside to the wind, causing her to tip on her side, which in turn caused sacks of ballast to be released. Even then the Patrie could have been saved; had the release cord been attached to the gas-bag, a single tug on the cord would have been enough to release the hydrogen and save the ship. An oversight led to this not being done. Thus, the troops were unable to keep control of her, and could not continue to hold her down in the storm.

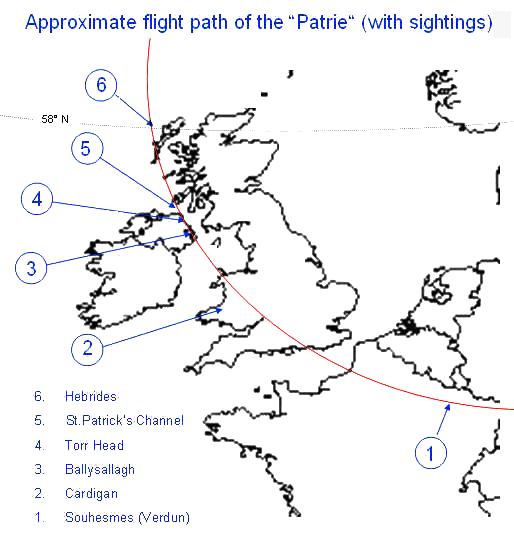
Approximate flight path taken by the Patrie based on recorded sightings

Relieved of her ballast of 750 kilograms (1,650 lb) and without a crew, she shot up to a great height (calculated by the constructor to have been some 2,000 metres (6,600 ft)), and was carried away in a north-westerly direction. Two days later there was still no news. In 2007, the French newspaper Journal l'Alsace / Le Pays reprinted a news item from 5 December 1907, which spoke of the "anxiety" caused in Paris by this "disaster". It was feared that the Patrie could have risen into an eastward air current, crossed the nearby Franco-German border and fallen into "Prussian" hands, so news reports of her whereabouts were eagerly awaited.

All that I can say to you is that, knowing how the hermetic valves work, as a consequence of the enormous pressure which they maintain, I am convinced that the airship will only deflate bit by bit, very slowly. She could therefore float about for a relatively long time. In any case, I consider that she is lost and that there is now no longer any hope of recovering her.

— M. Lebaudy, 3 December 1907.

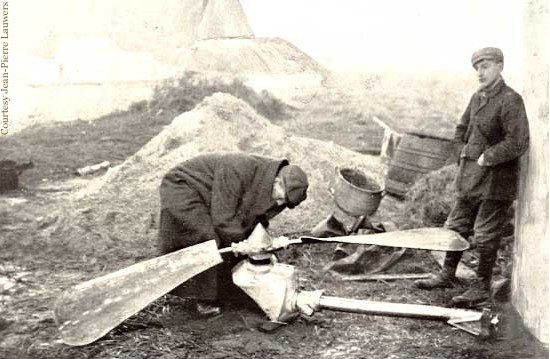
Propeller and gear assembly knocked off Patrie during temporary landfall in Ballysallagh, Ireland on 1 December 1907

Finally, reported sightings of the runaway airship filtered back to France and spread around Europe and the United States. As was printed in The New York Times the following day, the Patrie had been observed on the morning of Sunday, 1 December 1907, over Cardigan (Wales). On the afternoon of the same day, she made landfall at Ballysallagh, near Holywood, County Down in northern Ireland, where a propeller and bevel gear assembly were broken off (see photo). With the loss of this weight the Patrie once more ascended and was spotted by a Lloyd's signal station at Torr Head on the County Antrim coast. The next sighting came soon after, over islands in St. Patrick's Channel, between Ireland and Scotland. The Patrie continued to drift northwards, where the last reported sighting of the dirigible was by Captain Buchanan of the steamship Olivine at latitude 58°N near the Hebrides, after which she was never seen again.

=== Aftermath ===
Despite the loss of the Patrie, the French army did not lose faith in the Lebaudy/Julliot design: A sister-ship to the Patrie, the République, was already under construction at Lebaudy's Moisson works, and another airship of the same type (La Liberté) was ordered in August 1908. Two more airships of essentially the same design were ordered by the Russian Empire and the Austro-Hungarian Empire. The former, initially called La Russie and later known as Lebed, reportedly "an absolute copy of the French 'République'", flew for the first time on 29 May 1909. The inaugural flight of Lebed was hailed by Russia as a significant step forward in its aviation history. In its June 26, 1909 issue, Flight Magazine reported that the Austrian Government had ordered from Lebaudy "what appears to be a duplicate of the "Russie". This airship entered service with the Austrian Army in 1910.

== Specifications ==
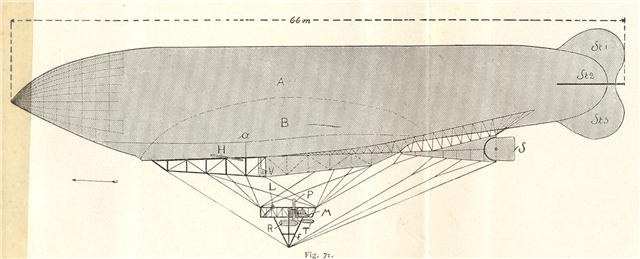
Side elevation 1906-1907

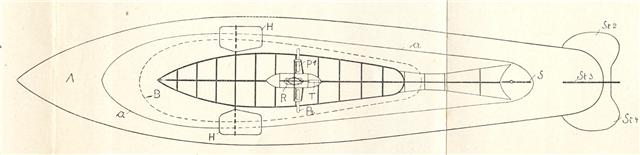
Plan view (from below) 1906–1907

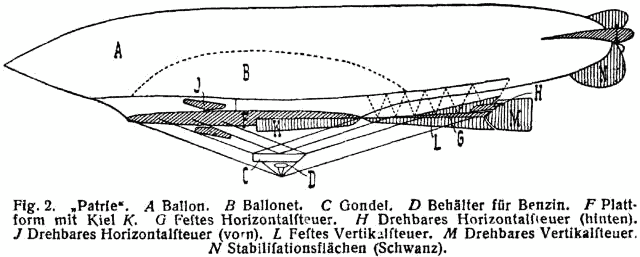
Annotated side elevation of the Patrie

Data from The Present State of Military Aeronautics, Flight Magazine Global Archive, 27 February 1909

General characteristics

- Crew: 4
- Length: 60 m (196 ft 0 in)
- Diameter: 10.5 m (33 ft 9 in)
- Volume: 3,300 m^{3} (111,250 cu ft)
- Useful lift: 1,260 kg (2,777 lb)
- Powerplant: 1 × Panhard et Levassor 4-cyl. (driving 2 propellers) , 52 kW (70 hp)

Performance

- Maximum speed: 48 km/h (30 mph, 26 kn)
- Cruise speed: 42 km/h (26 mph, 23 kn)
- Range: 450 km (280 mi, 240 nmi)
- Endurance: 10 hours

Armament

- Ballonet volume: 670 m³ (22,958 cu.ft)

== See also ==
Related lists

- List of airship accidents
