= La France (airship) =

Early French dirigible

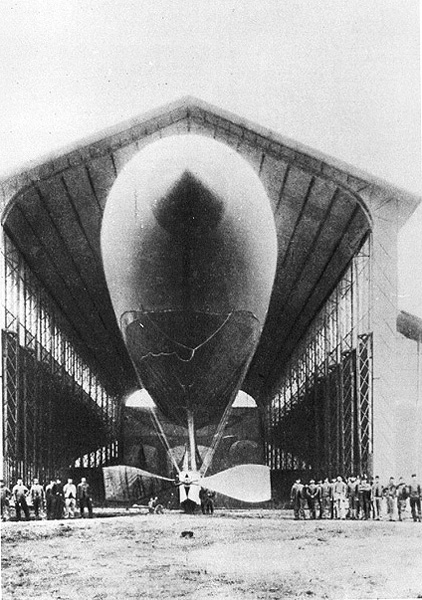
The 1884 La France, the first fully controllable airship.

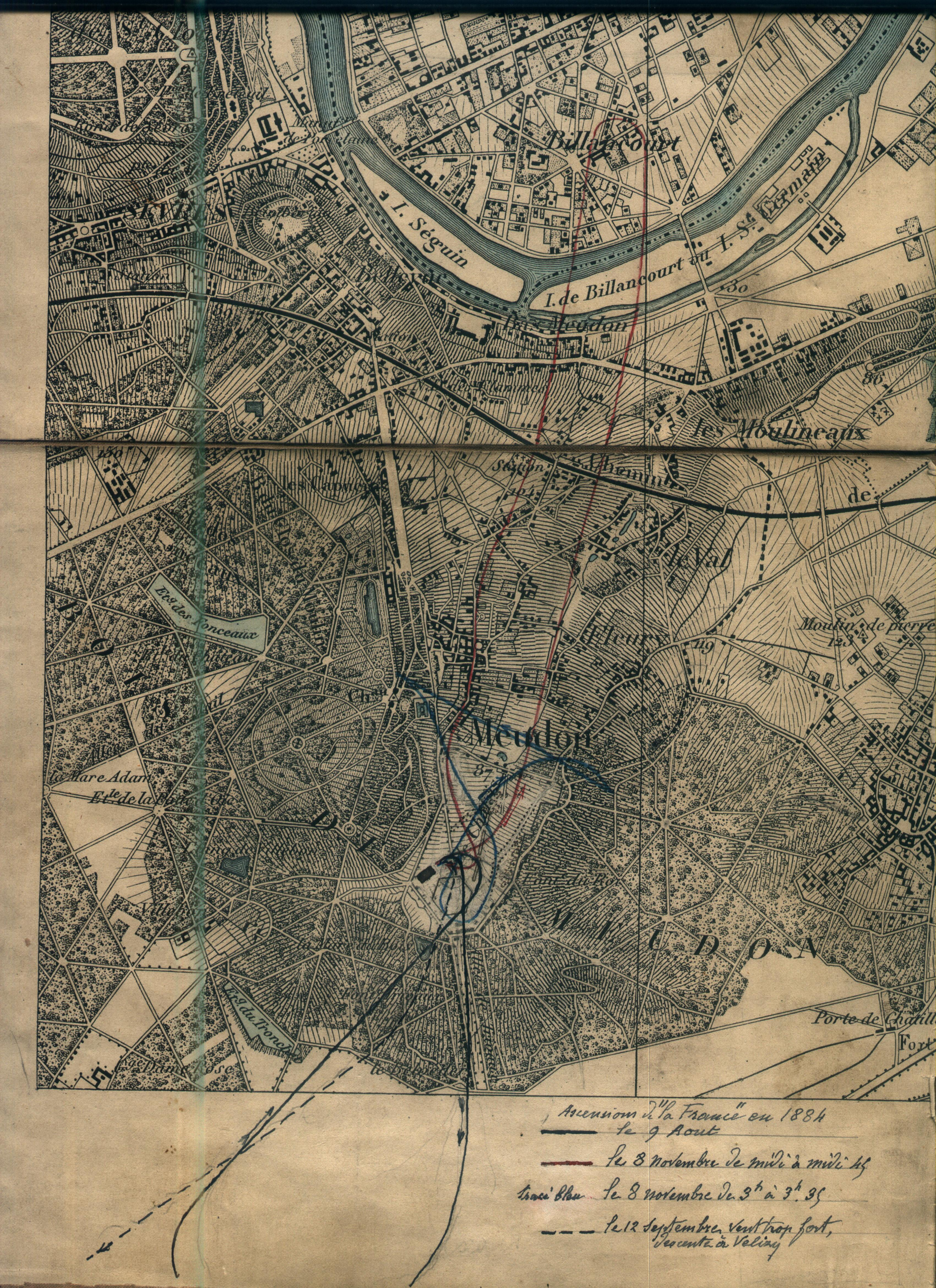
The 1884 Krebs & Renard first fully controllable free-flights with the LA FRANCE electric dirigible near Paris (Krebs arch.)

Artist's depiction of La France

The La France was a French Army non-rigid airship launched by Charles Renard and Arthur Constantin Krebs on August 9, 1884. Collaborating with Charles Renard, Arthur Constantin Krebs piloted the first fully controlled free-flight with the La France. The 170-foot (52 m) long, 66,000-cubic-foot (1,900 m^{3}) airship, electric-powered with a 435 kg (959 lb) zinc-chlorine flow battery completed a flight that covered 8 km (5.0 mi) in 23 minutes. It was the first full round trip flight with a landing on the starting point. On its seven flights in 1884 and 1885 the La France dirigible returned five times to its starting point.

== Hangar ==
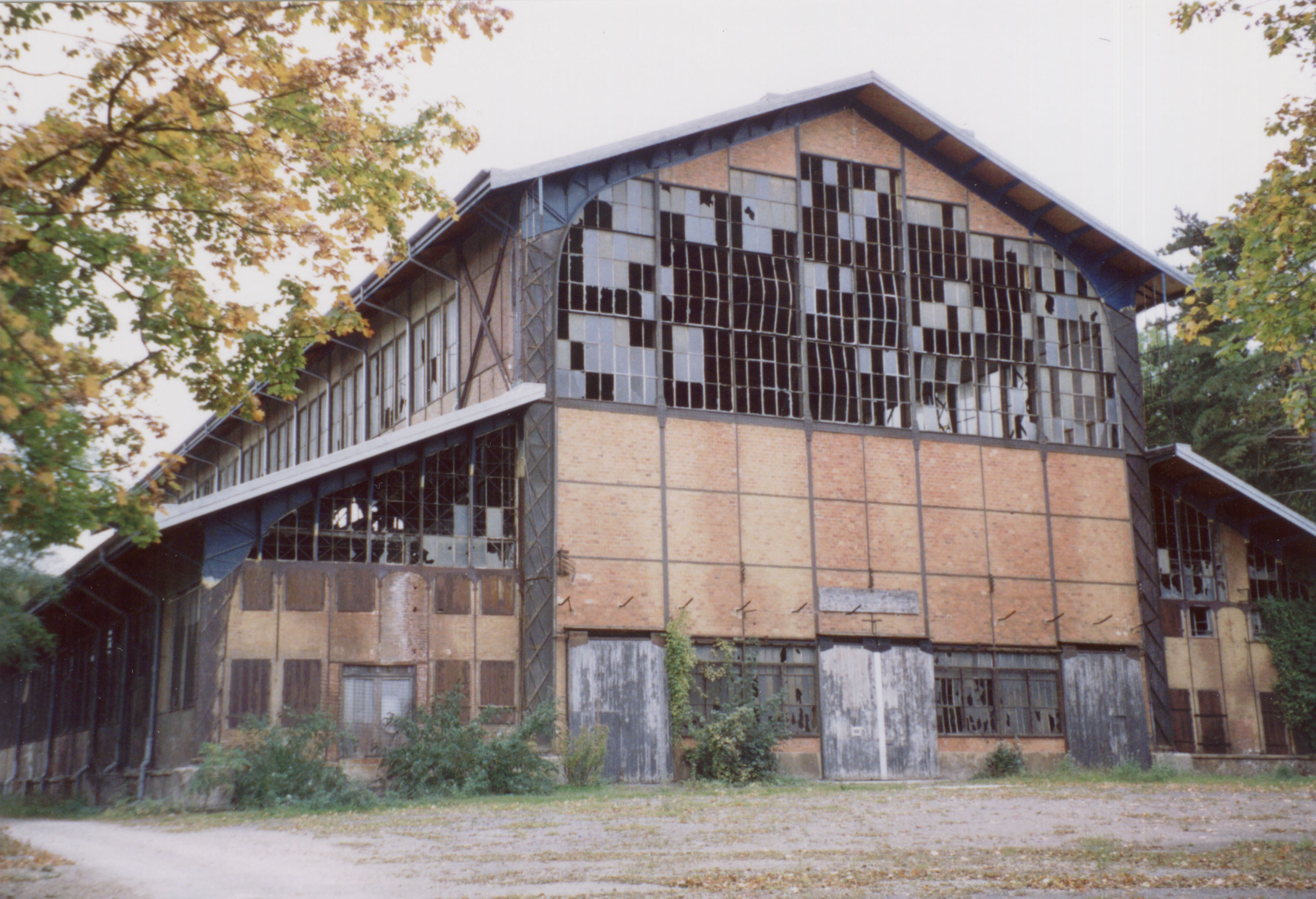
Hangar Y, Chalais-Meudon near Paris, France 2002

The La France was constructed in Hangar "Y" at Chalais-Meudon near Paris in 1879. Hangar "Y" is one of the few remaining airship hangars in Europe.

== Specifications ==
General characteristics

- Crew: 2
- Length: 50.90–52.00 m (167 ft 0 in – 170 ft 0 in) 32.9 m (108 ft) gondola of bamboo with silk covering
- Diameter: 8.4 m (27 ft 6 in)
- Volume: 1,841–1,900 m^{3} (65,000–66,000 cu ft) hydrogen
- Propellers: 2-bladed propellers, 7.0 m (23 ft 0 in) diameter 24 m (28 ft) pitch, 14.9 m (49 ft) drive shaft

Performance

- Maximum speed: 23.40 km/h (14.54 mph, 12.63 kn)
- Range: 12.2 km (7.6 mi, 6.6 nmi)

== See also ==
- Timeline of hydrogen technologies
