= Louis Capazza =

French balloonist

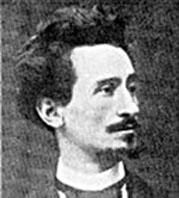

Louis Henri Capazza (1862–1928) was a French semi-professional balloonist. He was born in Bastia, Corsica on January 17, 1862. He lived in Belgium from 1892 to 1898 then emigrated to the United States in about 1920. He died on December 28, 1928, in Paris after contracting pneumonia in Addis Ababa, Ethiopia.

== Ballooning accomplishments ==
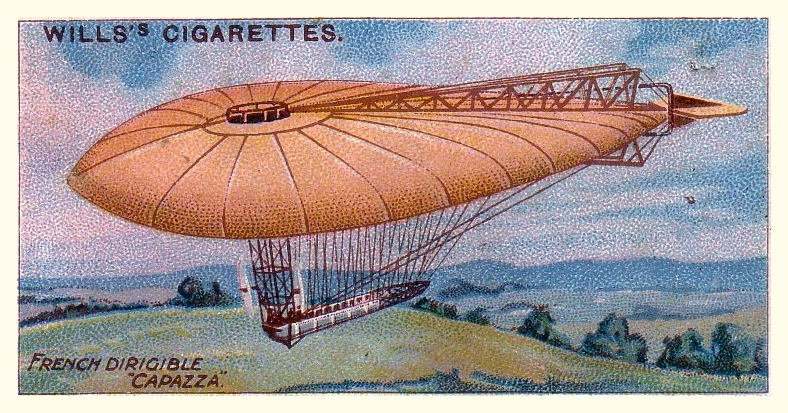
Capazza's lenticular balloon airship design of 1908

His first balloon ascent was on November 14, 1886, above Bastia and Ajaccio on board his own balloon "Gabizos". His first balloon flight and para-descent was made in 1892 from Villette, France; he made more than 35 balloon ascents in his lifetime. He was also a pilot of the airship "Lebaudy" in France.

He made many flights between 1891 and 1892 in Britain and between 1893 and 1894 in France. He designed a lenticular-shaped balloon airship and was the inventor of a parachute in which he made two jumps.

During a flight attempt in August 1892 at the Welsh Harp, England, the balloon slipped out of the net, and launched without him. The crowd turned into an angry mob, and tried to kill him.

On a flight in 1892 he used a unique balloon which utilised a large parachute in place of the traditional net. He launched from the Villette Gas Works, the balloon was purposely ripped in flight, allowing him to descend safely.

On November 14, 1899, he made the first balloon crossing of the Mediterranean Sea in "Gabizos" with a 21-year-old companion, Alphonse Fondère. He launched from Marseille at 04.30 and landed five and a half hours later in Appietto, Corsica.

On a flight attempt on May 7, 1903, his balloon caught fire on inflation.

On October 26, 1910, he piloted the Lebaudy Morning Post airship on its delivery flight form Moissons to Farnborough.

== Career ==
He originally studied at college as a professional engineer and worked as a Traffic Superintendent for French Railways. In 1883, he entered the Service of the Geological Survey to study the problems relating to the installation of the railway network of Corsica.

Noticed by Savorgnan de Brazza during its rise of 1886, Capazza became one of his best collaborators and was one of the founders of French Congo. He excelled in all his various endeavours - as a courageous explorer, administrator of territories, organiser of large business firms or banking, of mining railway companies and financial adviser in Morocco.

He was successively named member of the Council of the French Bank of Africa, then Superior council of the colonies and moreover administrator of the company Radio-France. He played even a certain diplomatic part, especially in 1911, at the time of the Franco-German disagreement in Morocco; according to Mr. François Berger, then secretary of the Commission of the Senate he deployed in this business "of marvellous qualities." He also suggested exchanging a territory of Means-Congo against the German rights to Morocco and was thus at the origin of the treaty which avoided the war.

He was elected president of the Commission on Airships of the French Aero Club in 1913.

== Honours ==
He received the Croix de Chevalier de son ordre, from King Leopold II of Belgium for research on balloon safety. In 1925, the Grand Prix town of Paris decreed upon him 'Officer of the Legion of Honour', vice-president of the French Association of aerial navigation.

== Commemorative plaques ==
There are two plaques commemorating Capazza's achievement of his Mediterranean Sea crossing. In Corsica, a monument was inaugurated on October 28, 1928, with the collar of San Bastiano, in the presence of Mr. Landry, president of the General advice.

In Marseilles, on the edge of the Saint-Michel plain, an inscription, due to the Botinelly sculptor and the architect Manor house, was dedicated to the glory of the two travellers by the care of the ministry for the Air, of the General advice of the Rhone delta, the Flying-club of France and the municipalities of Ajaccio, Bastia, Marseilles on November 16, 1930.

== See also ==
- List of works by Louis Botinelly
