= Charles Renard =

French military engineer

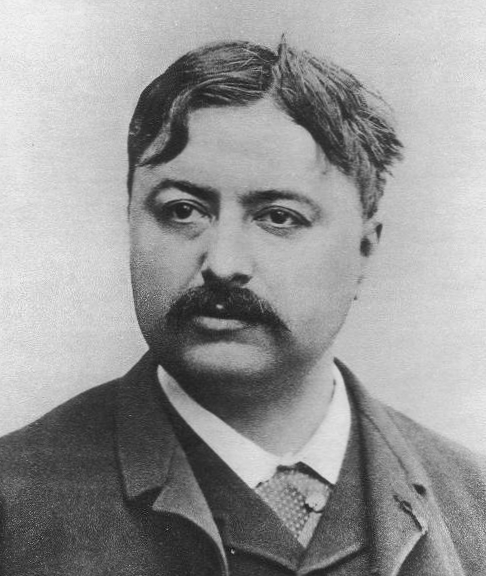
Charles Renard

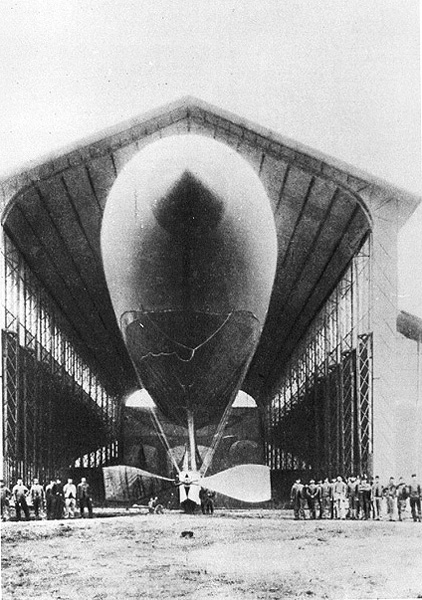
La France 1884, the first fully controllable airship or dirigible

Artist's depiction of La France

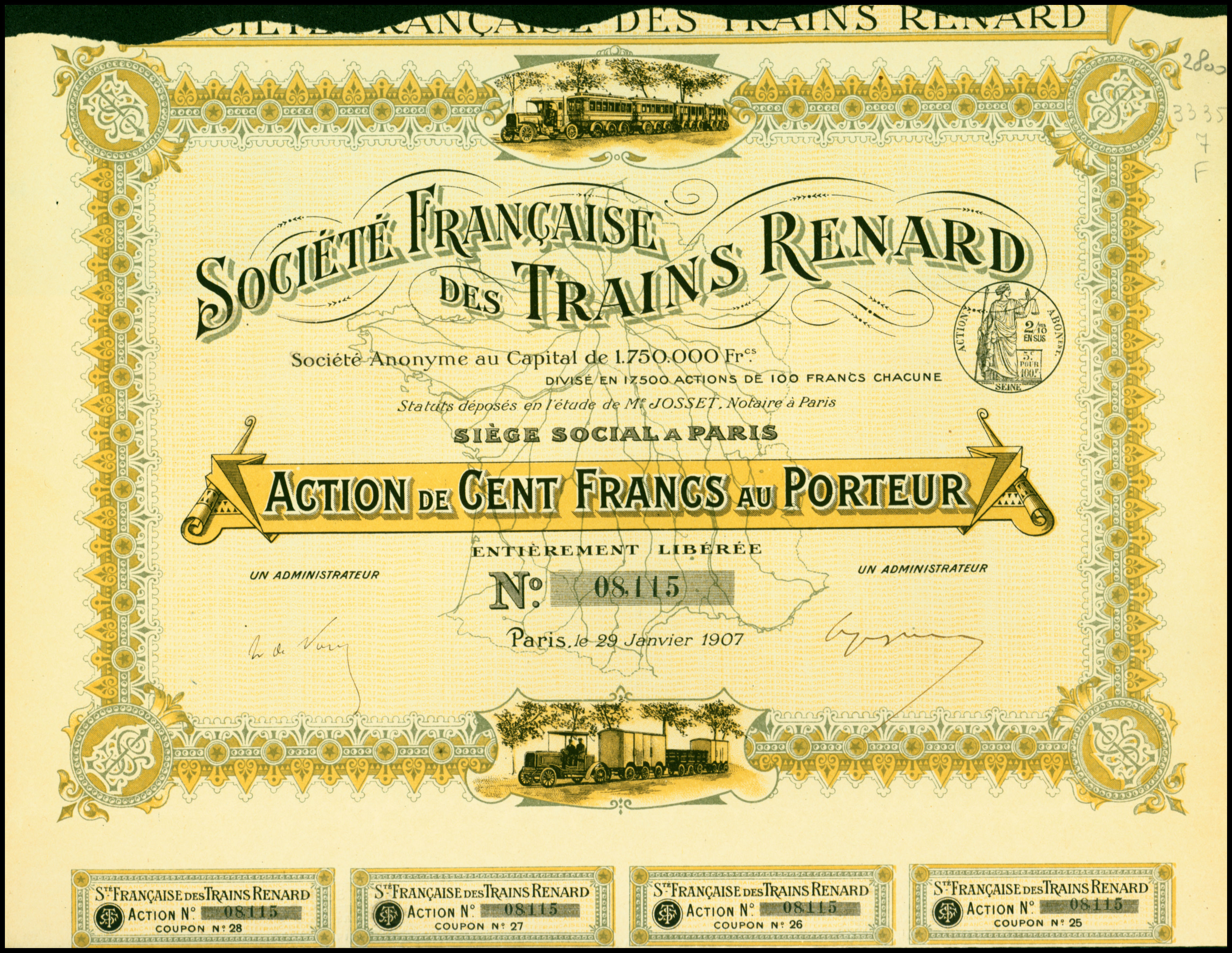
Bearer share certificate. Société Francaise des Trains Renard SA, issued 29 January 1907

Charles Renard (French pronunciation: [ʃaʁl ʁənaʁ]; November 23, 1847 – April 13, 1905) was a French military engineer born in Damblain, Vosges.

== Airships ==
After the Franco-Prussian War of 1870-1871 he started work on the design of airships at the French army aeronautical department. Together with Arthur C. Krebs and his brother Paul, in 1884 he constructed La France, which made its maiden flight on 9 August 1884 at Chalais-Meudon, completing a 23-minute circular flight. This was the first time that a flying machine returned to the place of take-off. It was later exhibited at the Paris Exposition Universelle (1889).

== Preferred numbers ==
Ca. 1877 he proposed a system of preferred numbers known as Renard numbers that was later reportedly published in an 1886 instruction for captive balloon troops, which was named after him in the 1920s and became international standard ISO 3. It helped the French army to reduce the types of balloon ropes kept on inventory from 425 to 17.

== Road train ==
Renard invented the Renard Road Train first developed by Darracq and displayed by them in 1903. It was later developed in England by Daimler. The leading motor unit generated the power it transmits by a shaft united between carriages by a universal joint to the driving wheels. These wheels, two of the six per carriage, are the central pair and are rimmed with iron. The resulting road-shock is absorbed by springs and rubber tyres on the other wheels. Each vehicle is steered by its predecessor through a series of rods and linkages and when a Renard train rounds a corner each vehicle follows precisely in the track of its predecessor. They were powered by a 16.1 litre Daimler engine. The last carriage always cut the corner.

== Academy ==
Depressed by the French government's refusal to fund his experiments and the rejection of his candidacy for membership of the French Académie des Sciences he committed suicide in April 1905. The Académie recognized his achievements with an award of the Prix Plumey for 1902 and the posthumous award of the Prix Poncelet for 1907.

== See also ==
- Arthur Constantin Krebs
