= Arthur Constantin Krebs =

French officer and engineer (1850–1935)

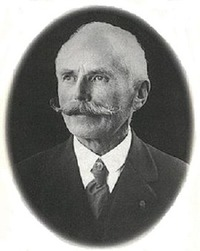
- Then managing director of the Panhard & Levassor Co. in 1910
- Born: 16 November 1850; Vesoul, France
- Died: 22 March 1935 (aged 84); Quimperlé, France
- Occupations: Officer and industrialist
- Known for: The first fully controlled free-flights with La France airship, the first fully functional submarine with the Gymnote experimental submarine, the first automatic carburetor, the Tire flexible coupling.
- Children: Antoine, Hervé, Louis, Anne-Marie, Arthur, Jean, Alain, Marguerite
- Relatives: Commander Léonce Krebs (elder brother), Charles de Fréminville (brother in law)
- Awards: The Ponti Prize from the French Academy of Sciences (together with C. Renard).
- Website: rbmn.free.fr

Signature
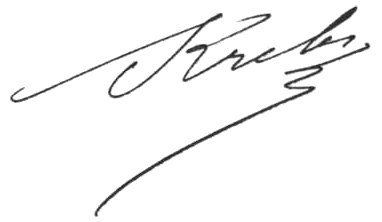

Artist's depiction of La France, 1884

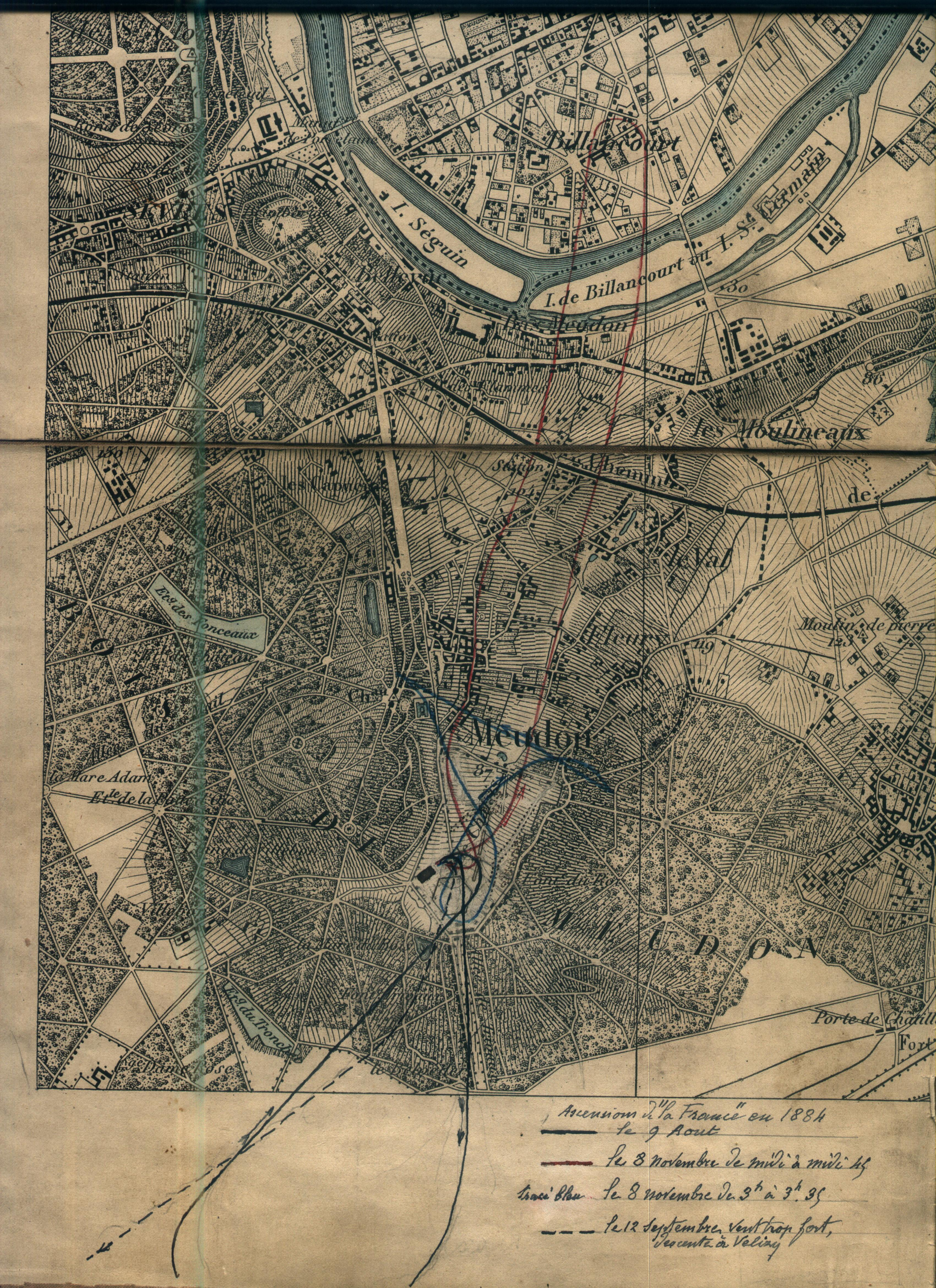
The 1884 Krebs & Renard first fully controllable free-flights with the LA FRANCE electric dirigible near Paris (Krebs arch.)

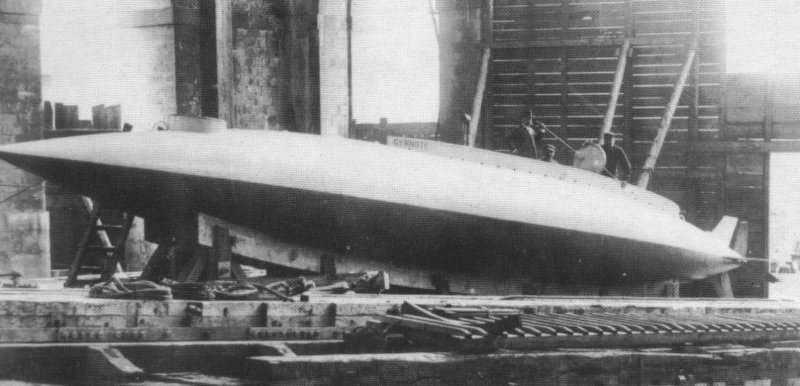
The Gymnote submarine in 1888. Arthur Krebs holds the airing mast. The periscope is visible

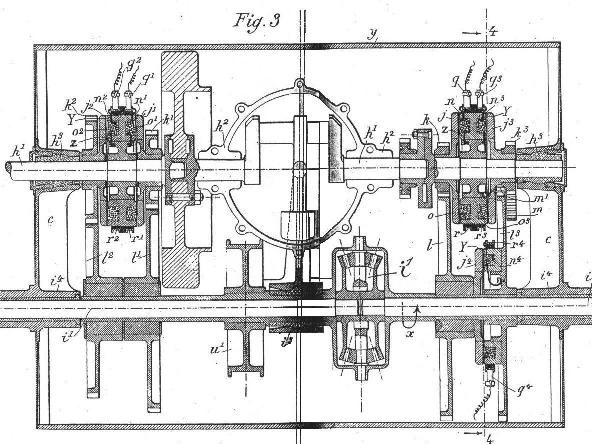
Electromagnetic gearbox from Krebs's car patent of 1896

Arthur Constantin KREBS: Main article on Wikiversity

Arthur Constantin Krebs (16 November 1850 – 22 March 1935) was a French officer and pioneer in automotive engineering.

== Life ==
Collaborating with Charles Renard, Krebs piloted the first fully controlled free-flight made in the French Army airship La France, which was designed in 1884. The flight covered 8 km (5.0 mi) in 23 minutes. The flight landed back at its starting point. On its seven flights the La France dirigible returned five times to its starting point.

Krebs and Renard shared the 1886 Ponti prize of the French Académie des sciences for their contribution to aerostation.

Krebs inspired Jules Verne. In Verne's 1886 novel Robur The Conqueror, he writes of "the striking experiments of Captain Krebs and Captain Renard".

In 1888 Krebs and Gustave Zédé designed the first modern French submarine, the Gymnote. The submarine was fitted with the first naval periscope and the first naval electric gyrocompass. The latter allowed the Gymnote to force a naval block in 1890.

From 1884 to 1897 Arthur Krebs modernized the Ville de Paris fire department; not only its equipment but its organisation as well. His work left a lasting impression in this elite corps.

In May 1896 Arthur Krebs patented a new automobile, fitted with an electromagnetic gearbox and a layout of the front wheels which re-centred them when the steering wheel was left alone. Today this is known as the Castor angle. The Panhard et Levassor company acquired a license to build 500 cars under the name of Clement-Panhard between 1898 and 1902 featuring this innovation.

Krebs succeeded Levassor as Panhard et Levassor's general manager from 1897 to 1916. He transformed the Panhard et Levassor Company into one of the largest and most profitable automobile manufacturers before World War I.

In 1898 Krebs replaced the tiller with an inclined steering wheel for the Panhard et Levassor car he designed for the Paris-Amsterdam race which ran from 7 to 13 July 1898. Fernand Charron won that race on a four-cylinder Panhard et Levassor. At the end of 1898, C S Rolls introduced the first car in Britain fitted with wheel steering when he imported a 6 hp Panhard et Levassor from France.

In 1902 Krebs invented the automatic diaphragm carburettor which gave cars continuous power during acceleration by providing a constant air-fuel ratio at all times; this also led to dramatic improvement in fuel economy.

In 1906 Krebs traveled to the United States to plead in the Selden Case, associated with Henry Ford.

The 1906 Krebs testimony in the Selden case.

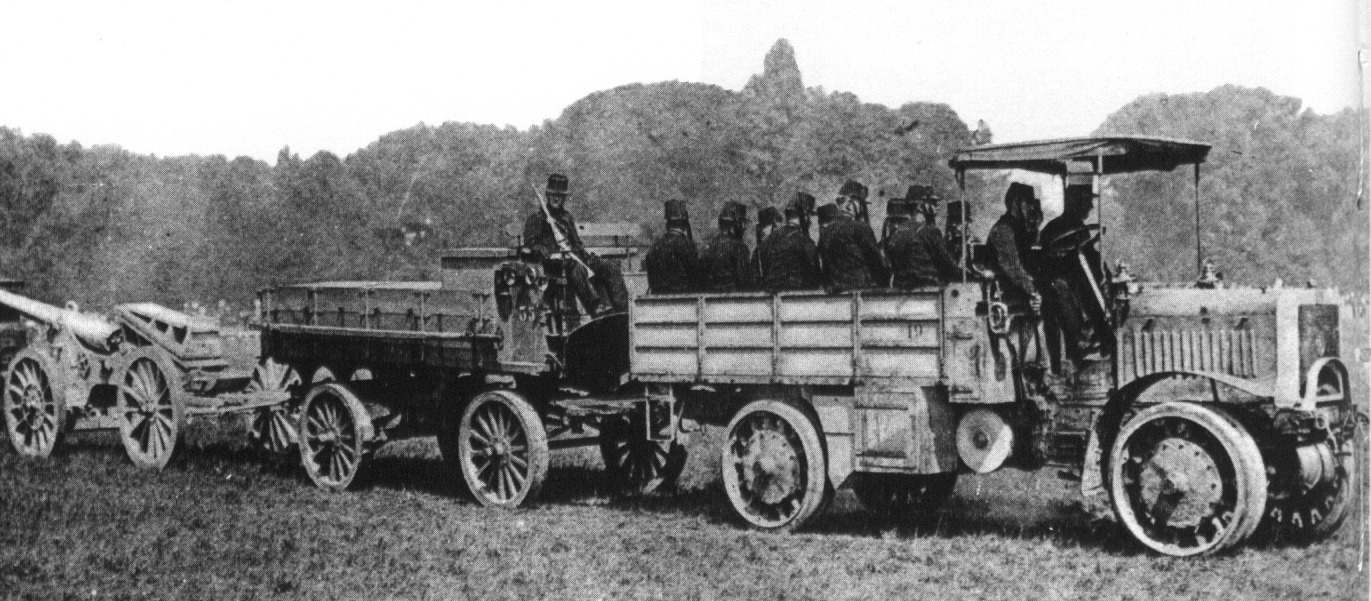
The four wheel drive and four wheel steering Tracteur Panhard-Châtillon military truck during the World War I.

Krebs introduced many improvements in car design: the steering wheel (1898), non-reversible steering (1898), engine balance (1898), nickel steel alloys and other special steel alloys (1901), the shock absorber (1906), multi-disc clutch (1907), the electric brake dynamometer for testing high performance engines (1905), the enveloping (globoid) worm gear differential (1915).

Also, Krebs contributed significantly to improve the Systeme Panhard (engine in front, rear wheel drive) which became universally adopted before World War II.

In 1909 Krebs became interested in the Knight patent (sleeve valve engine). He was also the first person in France to build that type of engine which Panhard et Levassor would produce during the thirty years leading up to World War II.

He made contributions to automotive racing with his powerful cars and motorboats.

In 1911 Krebs invented the first elastomeric flexible coupling (cf. John Piotrowski). It is known in French as the Flector joint. This device is still widely used today in industry for power transmission as a tyre coupling.

The truck was meant for military and civil purposes. In 1911, jointly with the Chatillon Co, Krebs designed the Tracteur Chatillon-Panhard all-terrain truck. The truck had four wheel drive and four wheel steering and many were used during World War I as artillery tractors.

Krebs also utilized his former military membership to supply the French Army with engines and vehicles including the 1904 Genty Armored car, the 1916 St Chamond tank, the Chatillon-Panhard 4x4 truck, and others.

In 1960, the United Kingdom Antarctic Place-Names Committee (UK-APC) named Krebs Glacier, a glacier flowing west into the head of Charlotte Bay on the west coast of Graham Land in the Antarctic continent, after Krebs.

== Papers presented to the French Académie des sciences ==
- 18 August 1884 – Krebs and Renard : About the "La France" Dirigible.
- 11/10/1884 – Krebs and Renard : The "La France" Dirigible.
- 1888 – Krebs : Closed Magnetic Field system of the Telephone.
- 1888 – Krebs : Electric Engine Trials for a Submarine Boat.
- 1890 – Krebs : The First Electric Gyrocompass (presented par M. Dumoulin-Froment)
- 24 November 1902 – Krebs : The Automatic Carburettor.
- 13 November 1905 – Krebs : The Electric Dynamometric Brake.
- 15 January 1906 – Krebs : The Progressive Shock Absorber.
- 04/08/1907 – Krebs : The liquid flow measurement apparatus.

In 1934, several months before Arthur Krebs's death, he was made a Commandeur of the Legion of Honour for his work in Aeronautics and for his contributions to the automotive industry.

== See also ==
- Blimp
- Pierre Janssen
- Saint-Chamond (tank)
- Timeline of aviation in the 19th century
- Timeline of hydrogen technologies
