= Les Souhesmes-Rampont =

- Commune
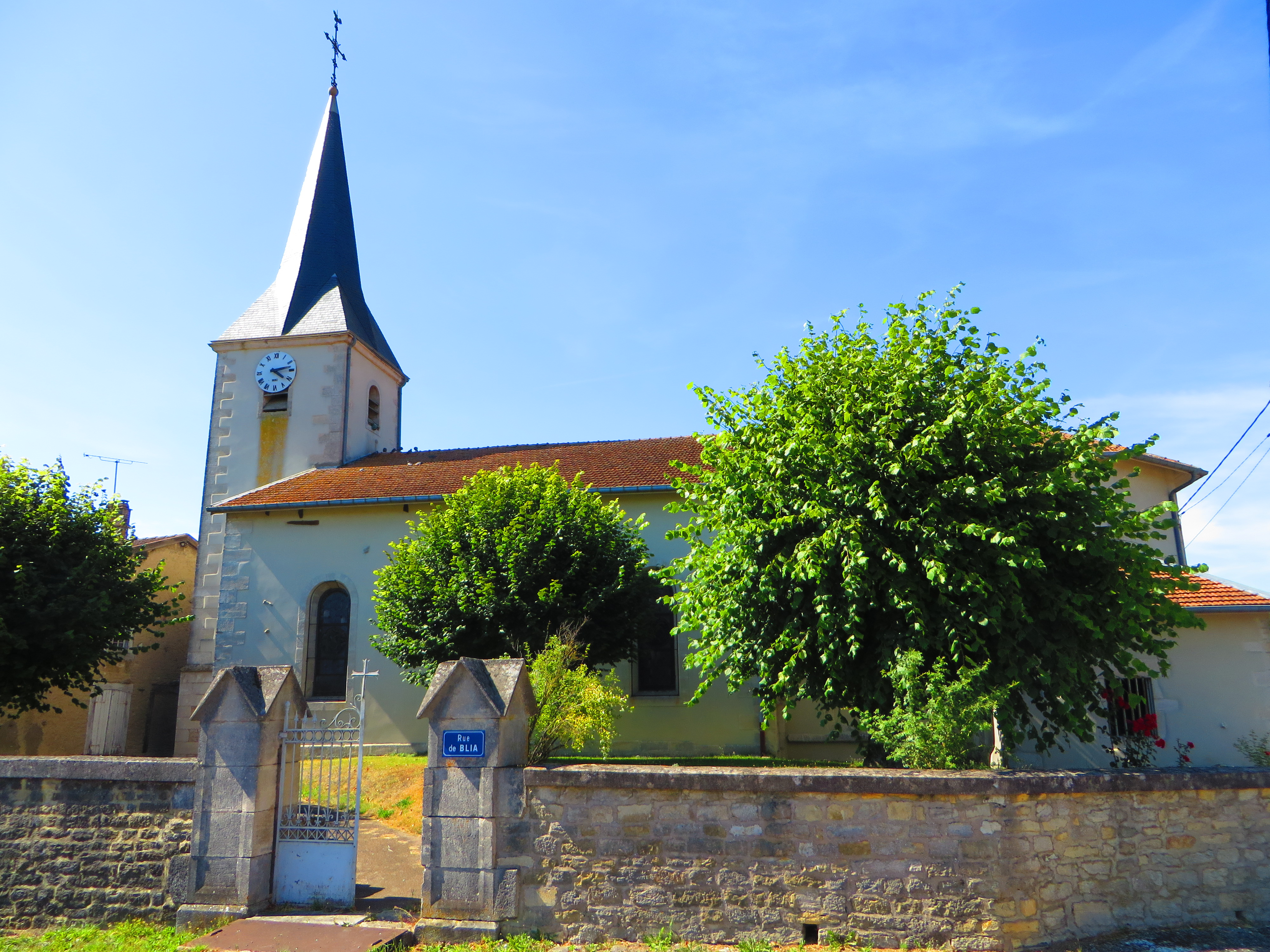
- The church of Saint-Airy in Les Souhesmes-Rampont

- Coat of arms
- Location of Les Souhesmes-Rampont
- Location within France Location within Grand Est
- Coordinates: 49°05′04″N 5°15′10″E
- Country: France
- Region: Grand Est
- Department: Meuse
- Arrondissement: Verdun
- Canton: Dieue-sur-Meuse
- Intercommunality: Val de Meuse - Voie Sacrée

Government
  - Mayor (2020–2026): Gérard Buys
- Area^{1}: 21.8 km^{2} (8.4 sq mi)
- Elevation: 250 m (820 ft)
- Highest elevation: 327 m (1,073 ft)
- Lowest elevation: 225 m (738 ft)
- Population (2023): 321
  - Density: 14.7/km^{2} (38.1/sq mi)
- Time zone: UTC+01:00 (CET)
  - Summer (DST): UTC+02:00 (CEST)
- INSEE/Postal code: 55497 /55220
- ^{1} French Land Register data, which excludes lakes, ponds, glaciers > 1 km^{2} (0.386 sq mi or 247 acres) and river estuaries.

Les Souhesmes-Rampont (French pronunciation: [le su.ɛm ʁɑ̃pɔ̃]) is a commune in the Meuse department in Grand Est in north-eastern France. It was created in 1973 by the merger of two former communes: Rampont and Les Souhesmes.

== See also ==
- Communes of the Meuse department
