= Lebaudy Frères =

French sugar producer and manufacturer of semi-rigid airships

Lebaudy Frères was a French sugar producer based in Moisson, France. In addition to sugar, they also made a series of semi-rigid airships in the early years of the twentieth century, some of which saw service with several European armies.

== Operation ==
Paul and Pierre Lebaudy were the owners of a sugar refinery who, with the assistance of their engineer Henri Julliot as designer, built semi-rigid airships which saw service with the French army, the Russian army and the Austrian army.

They constructed an airship hangar at Moisson, near the River Seine downstream from Paris and were instrumental in the development of airships in the first decade of the twentieth century.

Their semi-rigid airships were considered useful for military purposes and several were ordered by the French War Ministry.

== Airships designed by Henri Julliot for Lebaudy Frères ==
Lebaudy Frères, Moisson près Mantes (Seine-et-Oise). Builders of pressure airships of the keel-girder type to the designs of M. Henri Juillot (sic). Keel-girder of steel-tubing, forming a rigid understructure. Trim controlled by lifting planes.

According to "D'Orcy's Airship Manual", 1917
Works No.	Name (Trials)	Length (m)	Beam (m)	Volume (m³)	Power (h.p.)	Speed (km/h)	Notes	Picture
1	Lebaudy (November 1902)	56.5	9.8	2,284	40	35	Experimental airship. Astra hull. One Mercedes engine; twin-screws. Ballonet: 300 m³. Was the first successful modern airship. Best endurance : 98 km. in 2.75 hours. Refitted with a new hull, the airship made 12 ascents but was carried away by the storm on 28 August 1904 and badly damaged.	An artist's impression of the first Lebaudy airship.
la	Lebaudy II. (August 1904)	56.5	9.8	2,660	40	35	After damage in August 1904 the Lebaudy I was repaired and rebuilt as the Lebaud II. Ballonet: 500 m³. Resumed her ascents, but was again laid up for repairs of her hull, which had been torn by a storm when landing at the Camp de Châlons.	An artist's impression, believed to be of the 1904 Lebaudy airship.
Ib	Lebaudy III (July 1905)	56.5	10	2,950	50	35	After damage in a storm, the Lebaudy II was repaired and rebuilt as the Lebaud III. Reached on 10 November 1905, twice in succession, an altitude of 1,370 m. Her builders sold the airship to the French Army for the nominal sum of Frs. 80,000 ($16,000) in December 1905.	
Ic	Lebaudy IV (October 1908)	61	10.3	3,300	70	40	French Army airship, as rebuilt by the Army Airship Works. Ballonet: 650 m³. One Panhard-Levassor engine; twin-screws. Best altitude, 1,550 m. (in 1908). Was moored in the open for 17 days in the autumn of 1909. Dismantled in 1912.	
2	Patrie (November 1906)	61	10.3	3,250	60	45	French Army airship. Ballonet :650 m³. One Panhard-Levassor engine; twin-screws. Best endurance:240 km. in 6.75 hrs, after reconstruction. Was carried away by a storm on 30 November 1907; likely crashed in the Atlantic.	Patrie in 1907.
2a	(November 1907)	61	10.9	3,650	60	45		
3	La République (June. 1908)	61	10.9	3,700	70	50	French Army airship. Ballonet: 730 m³. One Panhard-Levassor engine : twin-screws. Best endurance (in closed circuit) : 210 km. in 7.25 hrs. Was destroyed in mid-air on 25 August 1909 through the breaking of one screw which burst the hull. The crew of four were killed.	République immediately prior to first flight on 24 June 1908.
4	Lebedj (ex-Russie) (May 1909)	61.2	10.9	3,800	70	49	Russian Army airship. One Panhard-Levassor engine; twin-screws. Ballonet : 900 m³.	
5	Liberté (August 1909)	65	12.5	4,200	120	45	French Army airship, as originally (August 1909) laid down. Was modified, on account of the disaster of the République, before being commissioned.	
5a	(June 1910)	84	12.8	7,000	120	53	Two Panhard-Levassor engines; twin-screws. Designed endurance : 8 hrs Dismantled in 1914.	
6	M. II (May 1910)	70	10.9	4,800	130	45	Austrian Army airship. Built to Messrs. Lebaudy's designs by the Motor-Luftfahrzeug Gesellschaft of Vienna. Keel-girder pressure type. Trim controlled by lifting planes. Ballonet: 1,300 me. One Austro-Daimler engine: twin-screws. Designed endurance: 10hrs. Best altitude: 1,350m. Dismantled in 1913.	
7	Morning Post (September 1910)	103	12	9,800	270	55	British Army airship, purchased by a national subscription started by the London daily newspaper Morning Post. Ballonet : 2,500 m³. Two Panhard- Levassor engines; twin-screws. On 26 October 1910 the airship flew from Moisson to Aldershot (370 km. in 5.5 hrs), but was damaged on being berthed. Re-commissioned a few months afterwards, the airship was wrecked through faulty manoeuvring on 4 May 1911, by stranding in some trees.	The British Army's Lebaudy Morning Post airship taking off.
8	Lebaudy Kretchet (1911)	70	14	5,680	200	50	Russian Army airship, built to Messrs. Lebaudy's designs by the Russian Army Airship Works. Keel-girder, pressure type . Two Panhard-Lavassor engines; twin-screws.	
9	Lebaudy Capitaine-Marchal (1911)	85	12.8	7,200	160	50	French Army airship. Two Panhard-Levassor engines; twin-screws. Named after the commander of the ill-fated Republique; presented to the Army by her builders. Designed endurance: 10hrs. Dismantled in 1914.	
10	Lebaudy Lieut. Selle-de-Beauchamp (1911)	89	14.6	10,000	200	55	French Army airship. Two Panhard-Levassor engines; twin-screws. Named after a balloon observation officer of the First French Republic. Designed endurance: 12hrs. Best altitude: 1,685m.	
11	Lebaudy Tissandier (1914)	140	15.5	28,000	1,350	80	French Army airship. Nine Salmson engines mounted in groups of three on three cars; three sets of triple-screws. Fitted with four machine guns and wireless carrying 600km. Designed endurance: 15hrs, at 2,500m, at full speed.	

== Bibliography ==
- d'Orcy, Ladislas M.S.A.E. (1917). d'Orcy's Airship Manual. New York: The Century Co. p. 232.
