= Ballonet =

Air-filled bags inside an airship's envelope

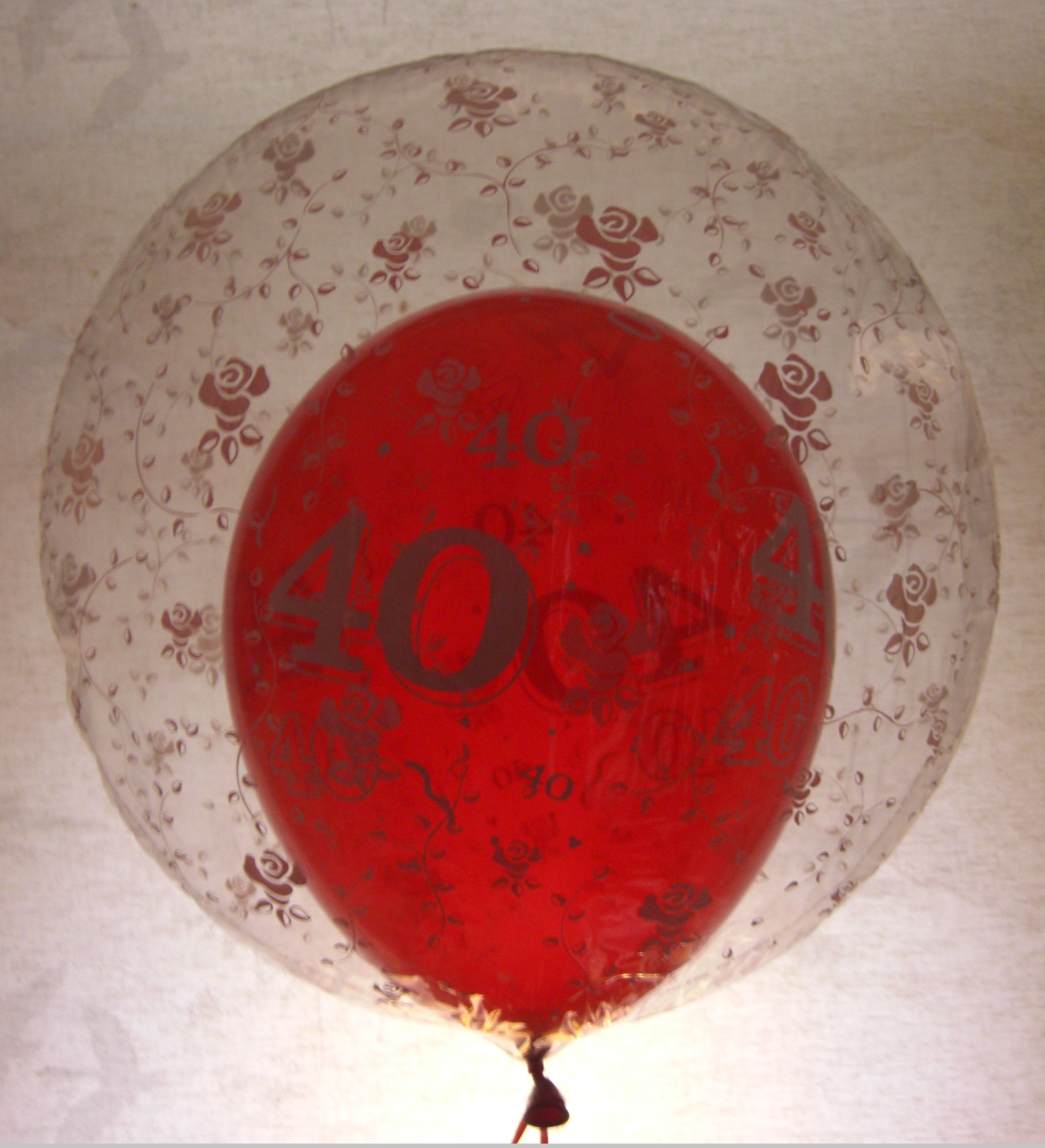
The air-filled red balloon acts as a simple ballonet inside the outer balloon, which is filled with lifting gas.

A ballonet is an inflatable bag inside the outer envelope of an airship which, when inflated, reduces the volume available for the lifting gas, making it more dense. Because air is also denser than the lifting gas, inflating the ballonet reduces the overall lift, while deflating it increases lift. In this way, the ballonet can be used to adjust the lift as required.

Ballonets may typically be used in non-rigid or semi-rigid airships, commonly with multiple ballonets located both fore and aft to maintain balance and to control the pitch of the airship.

The image illustrates the principle of a balloon within a balloon. The outer balloon represents the airship's outer envelope or gasbag, while the red inner balloon represents the ballonet. In an airship the ballonet would be much smaller relative to the size of the gasbag; for example, in the French airship Lebaudy Patrie the volume of the ballonet was approximately one-fifth that of the envelope.

== History ==
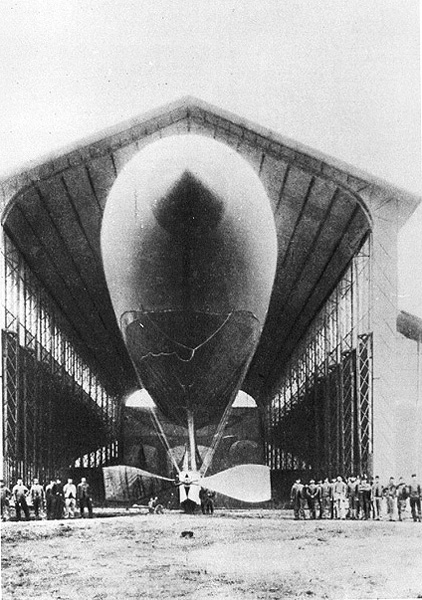
La France, the first successful airship

The ballonet was first described in 1783 by Jean Baptiste Meusnier, then a lieutenant in the French Army. However his own airship project was unsuccessful.

In 1784 professor Jacques Charles and the Robert brothers built an elongated, steerable craft that followed Jean Baptiste Meusnier's proposals. Their design incorporated Meusnier's internal ballonnet (air cell), a rudder, and oars for propulsion, which proved useless. On July 15 the brothers flew it for 45 minutes from Saint-Cloud to Meudon accompanied by M. Collin-Hullin and Louis Philippe II, the Duke of Chartres. The absence of a lifting gas release valve meant that the Duke had to slash the envelope to prevent it rupturing when they reached an altitude of about 4,500 metres (15,000 ft).

It was not until after Meusnier's death that the first successful application took flight. On 8 August 1884 the first practical airship, La France, flew for the first time.

Ballonet air valves were originally of a butterfly type, actuated by springs. If pressure rose in the ballonet, a spring would pressure the spindle of the butterfly valve to turn, relieving the pressure. In more recent implementations, the valves are actuated electrically either by a linear actuator (driven open/closed) or a linear solenoid (spring return), the latter being the favored fail-to-safe arrangement.
