= Moisson =

- Commune
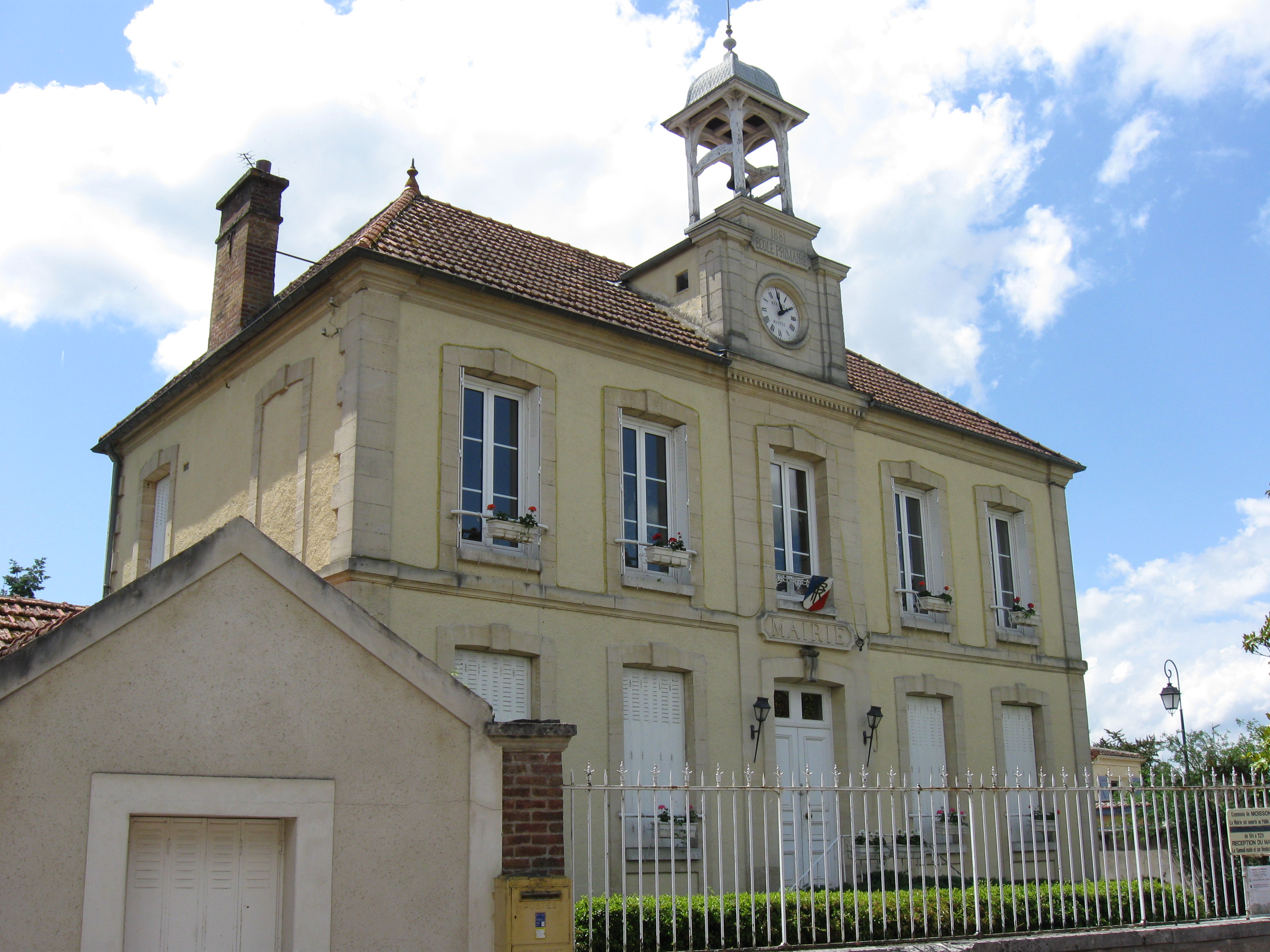
- The town hall in Moisson
- Location of Moisson
- Location within France Location within Île-de-France (region)
- Coordinates: 49°04′29″N 1°40′04″E
- Country: France
- Region: Île-de-France
- Department: Yvelines
- Arrondissement: Mantes-la-Jolie
- Canton: Bonnières-sur-Seine
- Intercommunality: Portes de l’Île-de-France

Government
  - Mayor (2020–2026): Cécile Debon
- Area^{1}: 9.70 km^{2} (3.75 sq mi)
- Elevation: 20 m (66 ft)
- Highest elevation: 43 m (141 ft)
- Lowest elevation: 11 m (36 ft)
- Population (2023): 902
  - Density: 93.0/km^{2} (241/sq mi)
- Time zone: UTC+01:00 (CET)
  - Summer (DST): UTC+02:00 (CEST)
- INSEE/Postal code: 78410 /78840
- ^{1} French Land Register data, which excludes lakes, ponds, glaciers > 1 km^{2} (0.386 sq mi or 247 acres) and river estuaries.

Moisson (French pronunciation: [mwasɔ̃]) is a commune in the Yvelines department in the Île-de-France region in north-central France.

== History ==
On 12 November 1903, the Lebaudy brothers made a controlled dirigible flight of 54 km (34 mi) from Moisson to Paris.

Moisson was the site of the 6th World Scout Jamboree, held in 1947, which brought together 24,152 Scouts and Guides from all over the world.

== See also ==
- Pierre Joubert
- Communes of the Yvelines department
