= Cody monoplane =

Cody IV
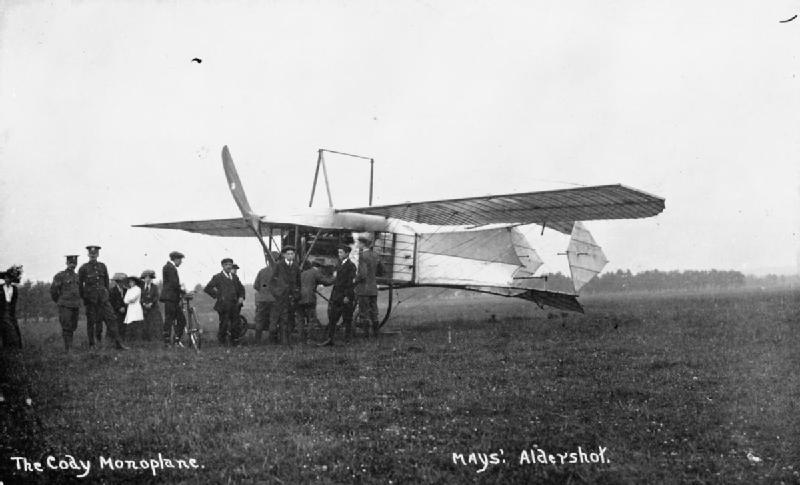

General information
- Type: Experimental aircraft
- National origin: United Kingdom
- Number built: 1

History
- First flight: 21 June 1912

The Cody IV monoplane was a single-engined monoplane designed and built by the American-born but British-based aviation pioneer Samuel Franklin Cody in 1912. It was intended for entry into the 1912 British Military Aeroplane Competition, but was wrecked in a crash before the start of the competition.

== Design and development ==
In December 1911 the British War Office announced a competition for a Military aeroplane capable of carrying a pilot and observer for the recently established Royal Flying Corps. First prize was £4,000, with the War Office having the option to purchase any of the prize winning machines.

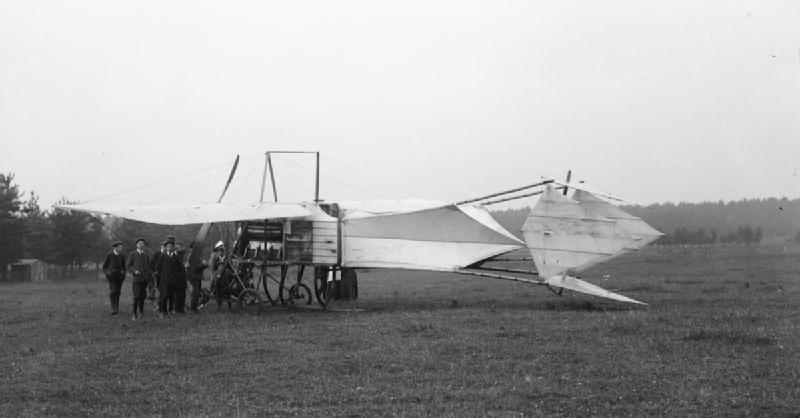
Rear view of the Cody IV, showing the tail surfaces

The American showman and aviation pioneer Samuel Cody, who had developed a system of man-carrying kites from 1901, built his first aircraft, the British Army Aeroplane No 1 at the Army Balloon Factory at Farnborough in 1908, making its first flight, recognised as the first powered controlled flight in the United Kingdom on 16 October 1908. In order to compete for the prize money offered by the War Office, Cody decided to design and build a new monoplane, while also entering his existing biplane that had finished fourth in the 1911 Daily Mail Circuit of Britain Air Race.

Cody's previous designs were pusher canard biplanes, but the new aircraft was a tractor high-winged monoplane powered by a single 120 hp (89 kW) Austro-Daimler engine which had been fitted to an Etrich Taube which had crashed during the 1911 Circuit of Britain, which Cody had purchased after the race. It had a deep fuselage that accommodated the crew of two side-by-side. The tail arrangement was unusual, with two elevators and two rudders carried on four bamboo booms that led back from the fuselage, the all moving tail surfaces forming a box shape. Fabric was stretched between the tail booms giving a cruciform shape as seen in cross-section. Lateral control was by means of wing warping, and the aircraft was fitted with a nosewheel undercarriage.

== Operational history ==
The monoplane made its maiden flight on 21 June 1912, but on 8 July a cow ran into the path of the aircraft during landing. The resulting crash badly damaged the aircraft and killed the cow, although Cody was not badly injured. As the Circuit of Britain aircraft had already been wrecked in a crash, Cody used the engine from the monoplane together with what parts he could salvage from the biplane to construct a new aircraft, the Cody V biplane, which won the Military Aeroplane Competition.

== Specifications ==
Data from The Aeroplanes of the Royal Flying Corps (Military Wing)

General characteristics

- Crew: 2
- Length: 37 ft (11 m)
- Wingspan: 43 ft 6 in (13.26 m)
- Height: 12 ft 6 in (3.81 m)
- Wing area: 260 sq ft (24 m^{2})
- Empty weight: 1,400 lb (635 kg)
- Powerplant: 1 × Austro-Daimler water-cooled six-cylinder inline engine, 120 hp (89 kW)
- Propellers: 2-bladed Chauviere, 11 ft 6 in (3.51 m) diameter

Performance

- Maximum speed: 70 mph (110 km/h, 61 kn)
