= Samuel Franklin Cody =

American aviator

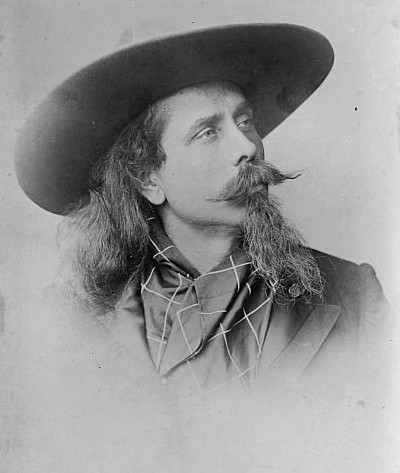
- Samuel Franklin Cody in 1909
- Born: Samuel Franklin Cowdery; 6 March 1867; Davenport, Iowa, U.S.
- Died: 7 August 1913 (aged 46); Cove Common, Farnborough, United Kingdom
- Occupations: Showman, aviator, aircraft designer
- Spouse: Maud Maria Lee
- Children: 1

Samuel Franklin Cowdery (later known as Samuel Franklin Cody; 6 March 1867 – 7 August 1913) was a Wild West showman and early pioneer of manned flight.

He is most famous for his work on the large kites known as Cody War-Kites, that were used by the British before World War I as a smaller alternative to balloons for artillery spotting. He was also the first man to fly an aeroplane built in Britain, on 17 October 1908. A flamboyant showman, he was often confused with Buffalo Bill Cody, whose surname he took when young.

== Early life ==
Cody's early life is difficult to separate from his own stories told later in life, but he was born Samuel Franklin Cowdery in 1867, in Davenport, Iowa, where he attended school until the age of 12. Not much is known about his life at this time, although he claimed that during his youth he had lived the typical life of a cowboy. He learned how to ride and train horses, shoot and use a lasso. He later claimed to have prospected for gold in an area which later became Dawson City, centre of the famous Klondike Gold Rush.

== Showman ==
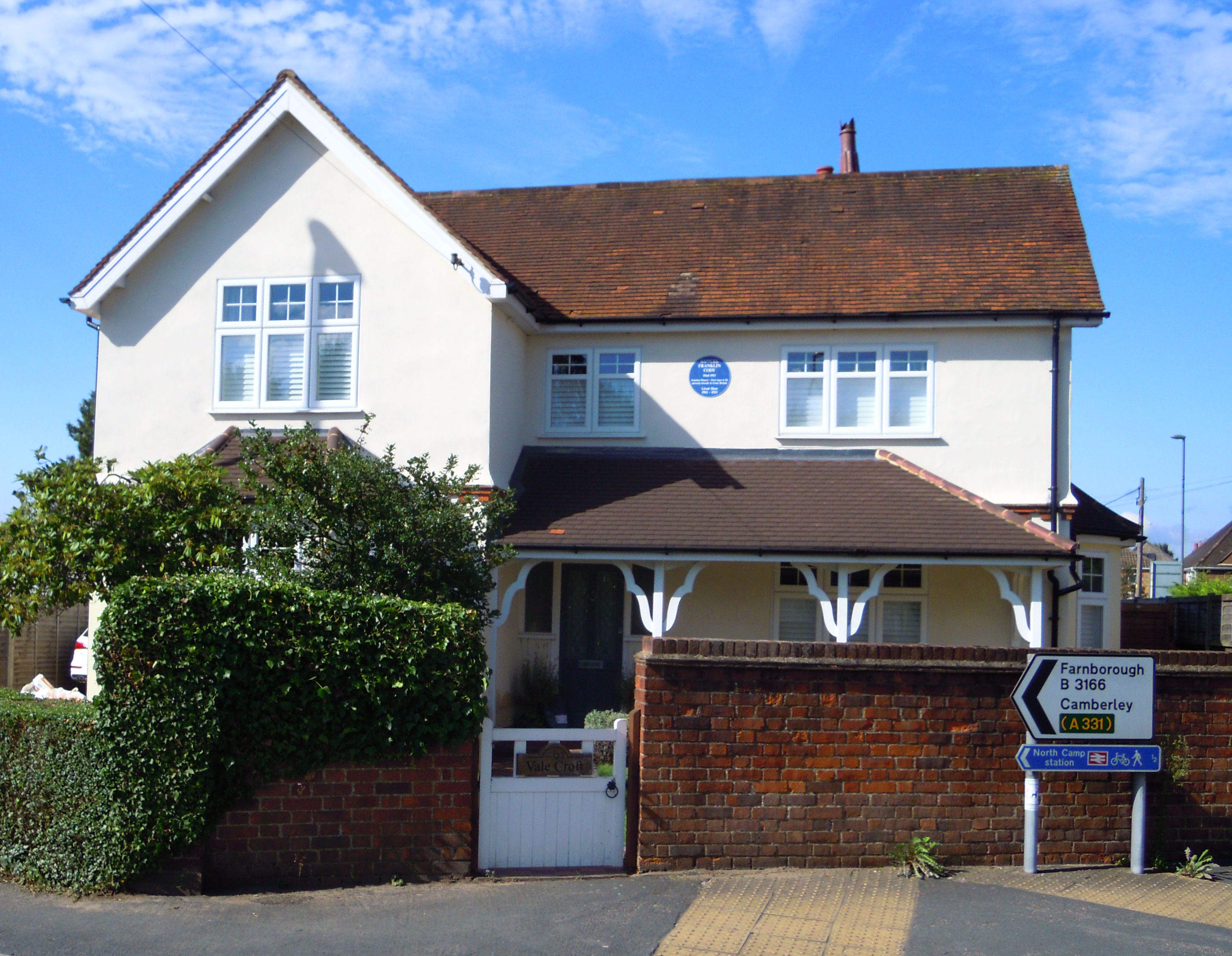
'Valecroft', Cody's former home in Ash Vale, Surrey, England

In 1888, at 21 years of age, Cody started touring the US with Forepaugh's Circus, which at the time had a large Wild West show component. He married Maud Maria Lee in Norristown, Pennsylvania, and the name Samuel Franklin Cody appears on the April 1889 marriage certificate.

Cody arrived in Europe in 1890, claiming to be the son of the well-known William "Buffalo Bill" Cody, though in fact the two were unrelated. Cody, together with his wife, toured England with a shooting act. Maud used the stage name Lillian Cody, which she kept for the rest of her performing career. In London, they met Mrs Elizabeth Mary King (née Davis), wife of Edward John 'Ted' King, a licensed victualler, and mother of four children, Edward, Leon, Vivian and Liese. Mrs King had stage ambitions for her sons. In 1891, Maud taught the boys how to shoot, but then later returned to the USA alone. Evidence suggests that by the autumn of 1891, Maud was unable to perform with her husband because of injury, morphine addiction, the onset of schizophrenia, or a combination of these ills.

After Maud Cody returned to America, Mrs King left her husband and took up with Cody. She took her younger sons with her [Leon and Vivian] but left her daughter, Liese, with husband Ted who was in the early stages of Bright's disease. While in England, Cody and Mrs King lived together as husband and wife. She used the name Lela Marie Cody and was generally assumed to be his legal wife. Her younger sons, Leon and Vivian (King), were known as Cody. However, the marriage of Cody and Maud was never legally dissolved.

While in England, Cody, Lela and her sons Leon and Vivian toured the music halls, which were very popular at the time, giving demonstrations of his horse riding, shooting and lassoing skills. While touring Europe in the mid-1890s, Cody capitalized on the bicycle craze by staging a series of horse vs. bicycle races against famous cyclists. Cycling organizations quickly frowned on this practice, which drew accusations of fixed results. In 1898, Cody's stage show, The Klondyke Nugget, became very successful; it included Lela's eldest son Edward, who was known as Edward Le Roy, and her younger sons Leon and Vivian (King), who were known as Cody to save any embarrassment.

One of Lela's great-grandsons (and the grandson of Lela's daughter Lizzy 'Liese' King with her husband Edward King) is the BBC World Affairs Editor John Simpson.

== Aeronautics ==
=== Kites ===
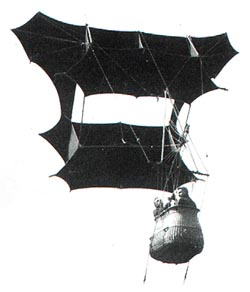
Man-lifting War Kite designed by Cody

It is not clear why Cody became fascinated by kite flying. Cody liked to recount a tale that he first became inspired by a Chinese cook; who, apparently, taught him to fly kites, whilst travelling along the old cattle trail. However, it is more likely that Cody's interest in kites was kindled by his friendship with Auguste Gaudron, a balloonist Cody met while performing at Alexandra Palace. Cody showed an early interest in the creation of kites capable of flying to high altitudes and of carrying a man. Leon also became interested, and the two of them competed to make the largest kites capable of flying at ever-increasing heights. Vivian too became involved after a great deal of experimentation.

Financed by his shows, Cody significantly developed Lawrence Hargrave's double-cell box kite to increase its lifting power, especially by adding wings on either side. He also developed a sophisticated system of flying multiple kites up a single line, which was capable of ascending to many thousands of feet or of carrying several men in a gondola. He patented his design in 1901, and it became known as the Cody kite.

Balloons were then in use for meteorological and military observation, but could only be operated in light winds. Cody realised that kites, which can only be operated in stronger winds, would allow these activities to be carried out in a wider range of weather conditions. His kites were soon adopted for meteorology, and he was made a Fellow of the Royal Meteorological Society.

In December 1901, he offered his design to the War Office as an observation "War Kite" for use in the Second Boer War, and made several demonstration flights of up to 2,000 ft (610 m) in various places around London. A large exhibition of the Cody kites took place at Alexandra Palace in 1903. Later, he succeeded in crossing the English Channel in a Berthon boat towed by one of his kites. His exploits came to the attention of the Admiralty, who hired him to look into the military possibilities of using kites for observation posts. He demonstrated them later in 1903, and again on 2 September 1908, when he flew them off the deck of battleship HMS Revenge. The Admiralty eventually purchased four of his War Kites.

In 1905, using a radically different design looking more like a tailless biplane, he devised and flew a manned "glider-kite". The machine was launched on a tether like a kite, and the tether was then released to allow gliding flight. The design showed little similarity to his earlier kites, but had more the appearance of a tailless biplane. It was notable in being the first aircraft to use ailerons (in fact they were elevons) effectively to control roll.

Cody eventually managed to interest the British Army in his kites. In 1906, he was appointed Chief Instructor of Kiting for the Balloon School in Aldershot and soon after joined the new Army Balloon Factory down the road at Farnborough, along with his purported son Vivian. The Factory would eventually become the Royal Aircraft Establishment, and Vivian Cody would go on to a long and successful career as a technical specialist. In 1908, the War Office officially adopted Cody's kites for the Balloon Companies he had been training. This group would in due course evolve into the Air Battalion of the Royal Engineers, No. 1 Company of which later became No. 1 Squadron, Royal Flying Corps and eventually No. 1 Squadron Royal Air Force.

Finally, in 1907, he created an unmanned "power-kite". Somewhat similar to his standard kite but with bigger wings and a tailplane with twin fins in place of the rear cell, this was fitted with a 15 hp Buchet engine. It was not allowed to fly free; Cody strung a long aerial wire down the length of the Farnborough Balloon Shed and flew it indoors.

All that remained to him was to bring together the manned free-flying glider and the power-kite's engine to create Britain's first aeroplane.

=== Nulli Secundus airship ===
The Airship Nulli Secundus, 1907

Before Cody could turn his newfound skills to aeroplanes, he was required to help complete an airship then under construction in the Farnborough Airship Shed. In December 1906, he was despatched to France, where he purchased a 40 hp (30 kW) Antoinette engine. During 1907, he was given full authority as the designer of the airship's understructure and propulsion system.

On 5 October 1907, Britain's first powered airship British Army Dirigible No 1 Nulli Secundus, flew from Farnborough to London in 3 hours 25 minutes, with Cody and his commanding officer Colonel J E Capper on board. After circling St Paul's Cathedral, they attempted to return to Farnborough, but 18 mph (29 km/h) headwinds forced them to land in south London at the Crystal Palace. There, the airship was damaged by the high winds.

=== Aeroplanes ===
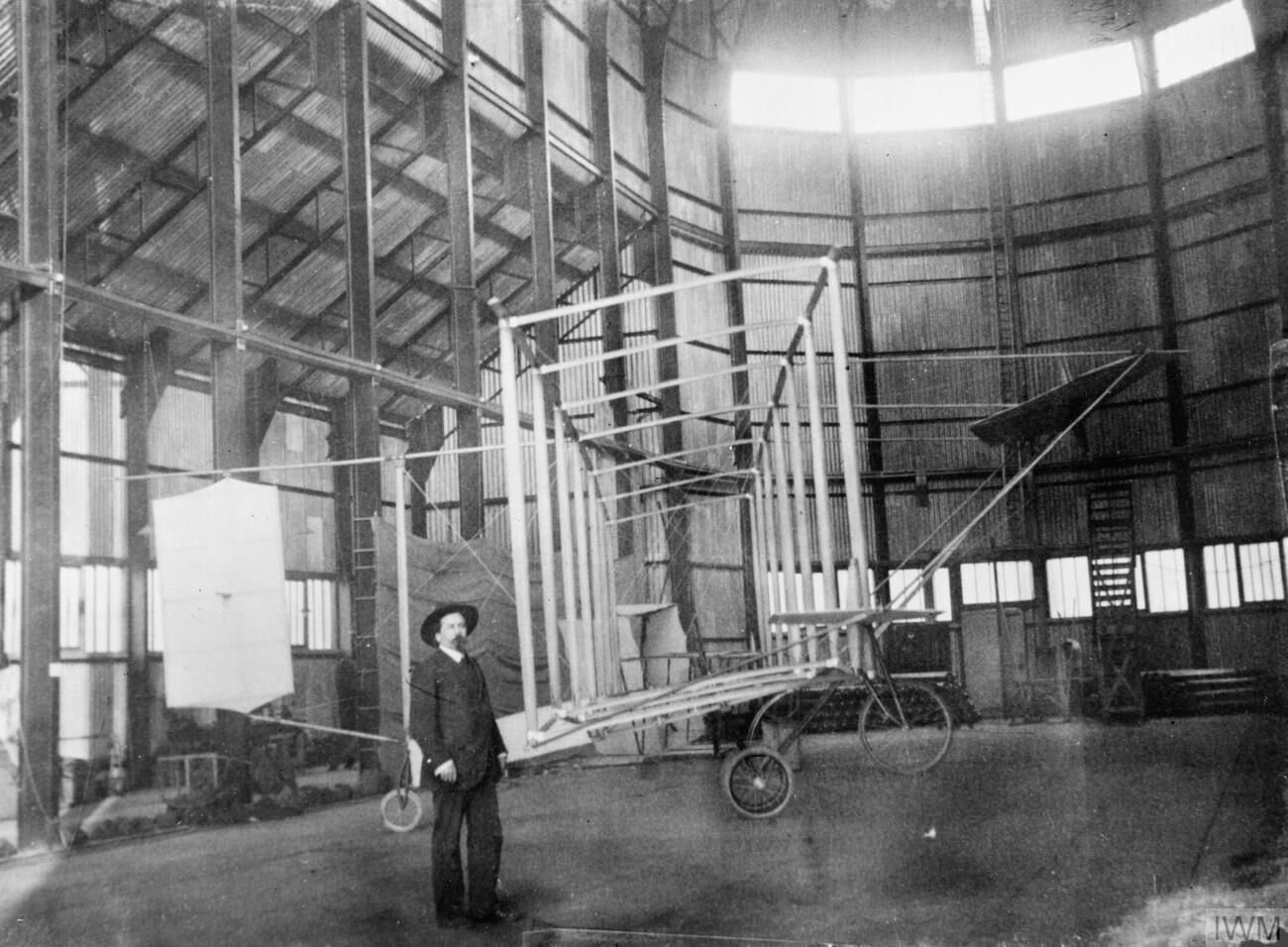
Cody in front of the frame of the British Army Aeroplane No. 1

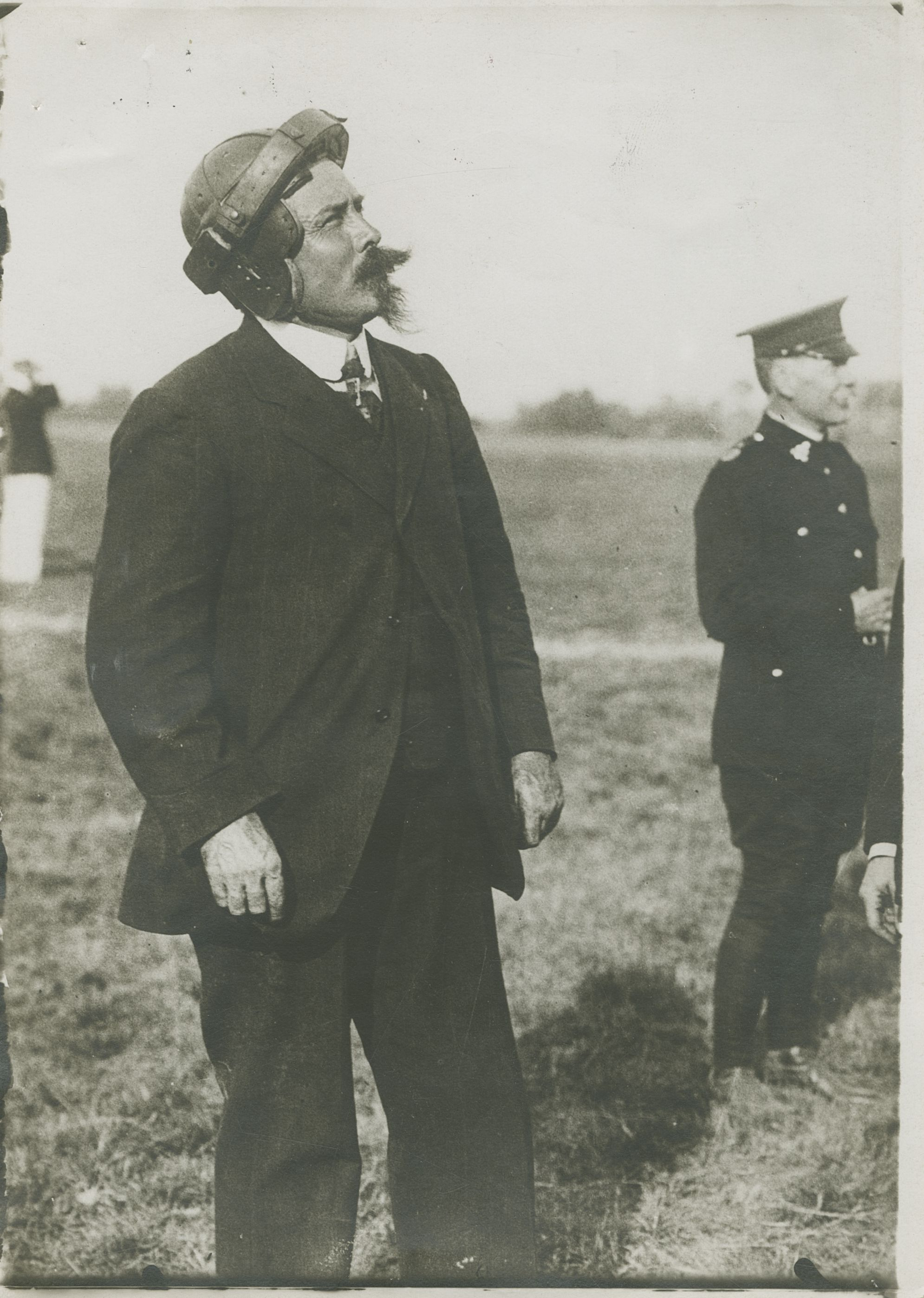
Samuel Franklin Cody in 1910

Later in 1907 the Army decided to back the development of his powered aeroplane, the British Army Aeroplane No 1. After just under a year of construction, he started testing the machine in September 1908, gradually lengthening his "hops" until they reached 1,390 ft (420 m) on 16 October 1908.

His flight of 16 October 1908 is recognised as the first official flight of a piloted heavier-than-air machine in Great Britain. The machine was damaged at the end of the flight. After repairs and extensive modifications, Cody flew it again, early in 1909. The War Office then decided to stop development of heavier-than-air aircraft, and Cody's contract with the Army ended in April 1909.

Cody continued to work on aircraft using his own funds. He was given his Army aeroplane, and continued to work on it at Farnborough, using Laffan's Plain for his test flights. On 14 May 1909, he succeeded in flying for over a mile, establishing the first official British distance and endurance records. By August of that year, Cody had completed the last of his long series of modifications to the aircraft. He carried passengers for the first time on 14 August: first his old workmate Capper, and then Lela Cody.

On 29 December 1909, Cody became the first man to fly from Liverpool in an unsuccessful attempt to win the Sir William Hartley Prize for a non-stop flight between Liverpool and Manchester. He set off from Aintree Racecourse at 12.16 p.m., but 19 minutes later he was forced to land at Valencia Farm near to Eccleston Hill, St Helens, close to Prescot, because of thick fog.

Over the winter of 1909–10, Cody worked on a new and improved aircraft at his shed on Laffan's Plain. During an early test flight while already airborne, the plane was caught by a gust of wind. Cody, who was piloting it, was not able to get it under control before it pitched forward and crashed to the ground. He was trapped under the wreckage where he was freed by his team, including his chief assistant Mr E Leroy. He sustained what were described as "serious injuries to his head and shoulders" but was taken home to recuperate and not hospitalised, and quickly recovered.

On 7 June 1910, Cody received Royal Aero Club certificate number 9 using the new aircraft, and later in the year won the Michelin Cup for the longest flight made in England during 1910 with a flight of 4 hours 47 minutes on 31 December.

In 1911, his third aircraft was the only British machine to complete the Daily Mail's "Circuit of Great Britain" air race, finishing fourth, for which achievement he was awarded the Silver Medal of the R.Ae.C. in 1912. The Cody V machine, with a new 120 hp (90 kW) engine, won first prize at the 1912 British Military Aeroplane Competition Military Trials on Salisbury Plain. He had first prepared a monoplane, the Cody IV, for the trials, but it was badly damaged in a crash before the trials began.

His last aeroplane, the Cody Floatplane, could be flown with either wheels or floats.

=== List of aircraft ===
- Cody War Kites (1901)
- Cody glider-kite (1905)
- Cody power-kite (1907)
- British Army Aeroplane No 1 (1908) or Cody No. 1 or Cody Cathedral
- Cody Michelin Cup Biplane (1910)
- Cody Circuit of Britain Biplane (1911)
- Cody monoplane (1912)
- Cody V biplane (1912) (for military trials)
- Cody Floatplane (1913)

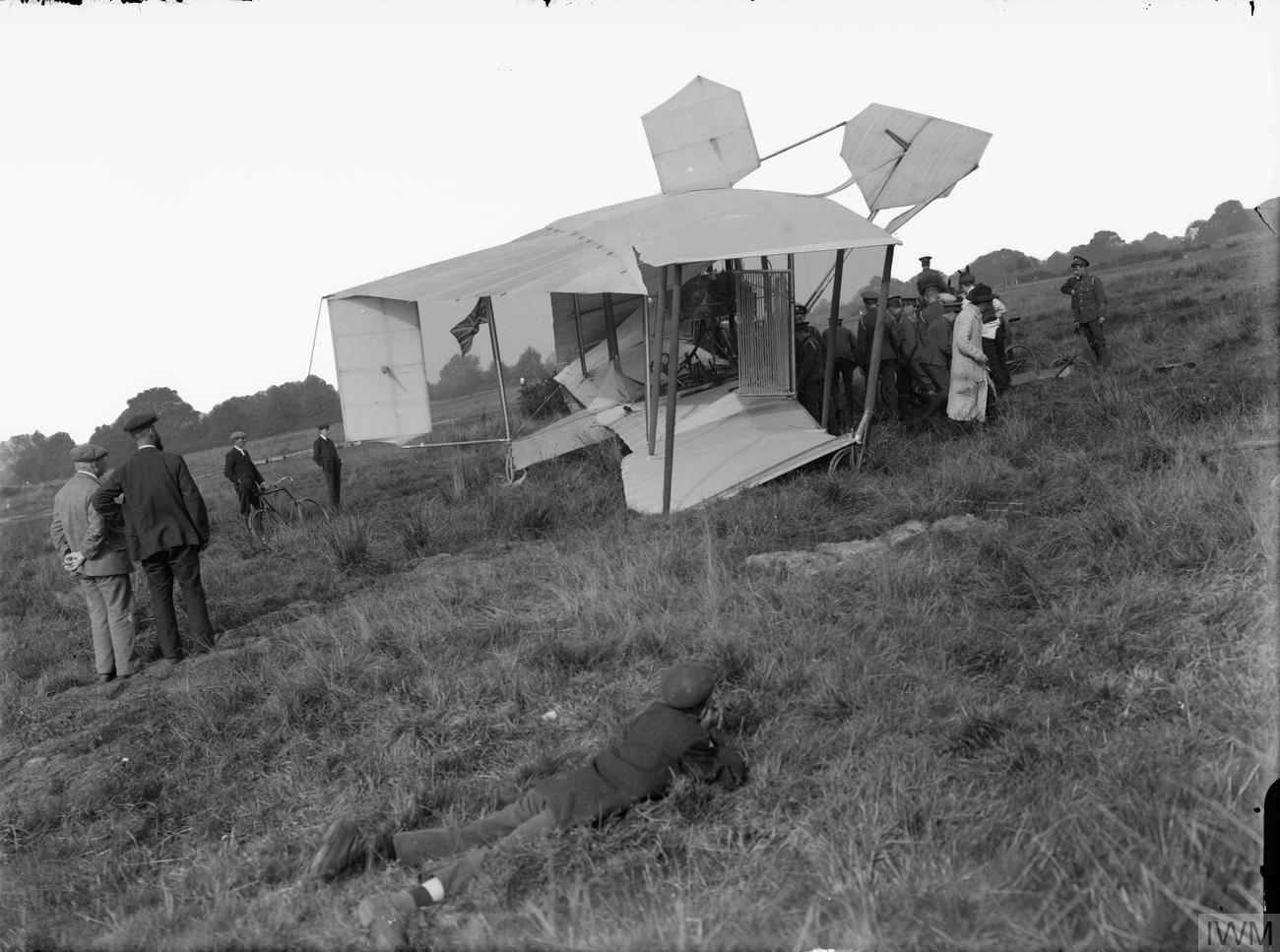
Cody's first plane crash

== Death ==
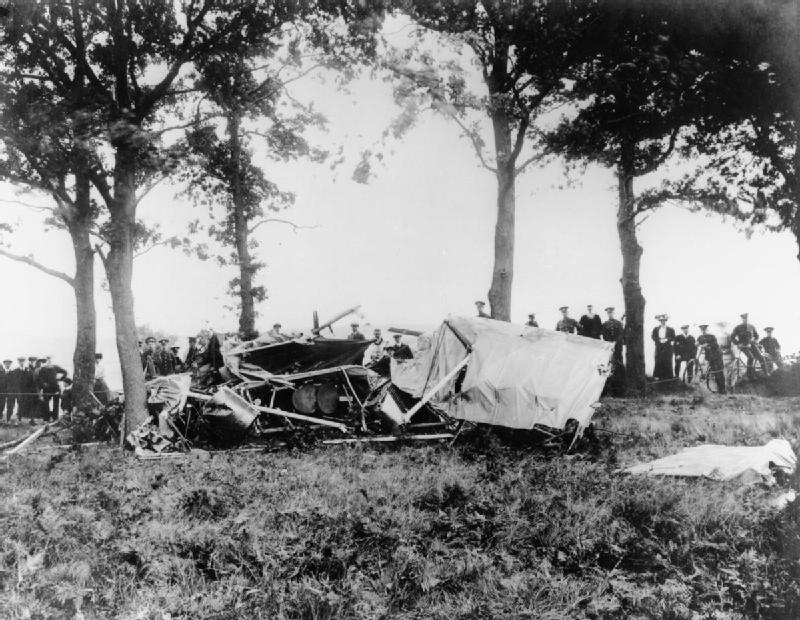
The wreckage of Cody's fatal air crash

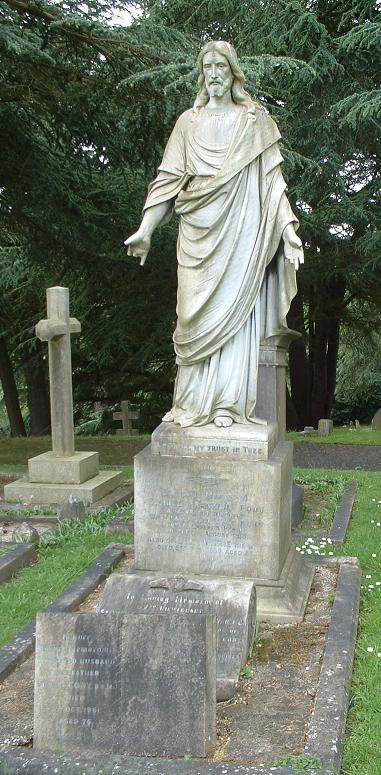
The grave of Samuel Franklin Cody in Aldershot Military Cemetery

On 7 August 1913, Cody was test flying his latest design, the Cody Floatplane, when it broke up at 200 feet (61 m) and he and his passenger, the cricketer William Evans, were killed at Ball Hill, Laffans Plain, Cove Common near Farnborough. The two men, not strapped in, were thrown out of the aircraft. The Royal Aero Club accident investigation concluded that the accident was due to "inherent structural weakness", and suggested that the two might have survived the crash if they had been strapped in. Cody's body was buried with full military honours in the Aldershot Military Cemetery; the funeral procession drew an estimated crowd of 100,000.

Adjacent to Cody's own grave marker is a memorial to his only son, Samuel Franklin Leslie Cody, born in Basel, Switzerland 1895, who joined the Royal Flying Corps and was killed in Belgium on 23 January 1917 while serving with 41 Squadron.

== Legacy ==
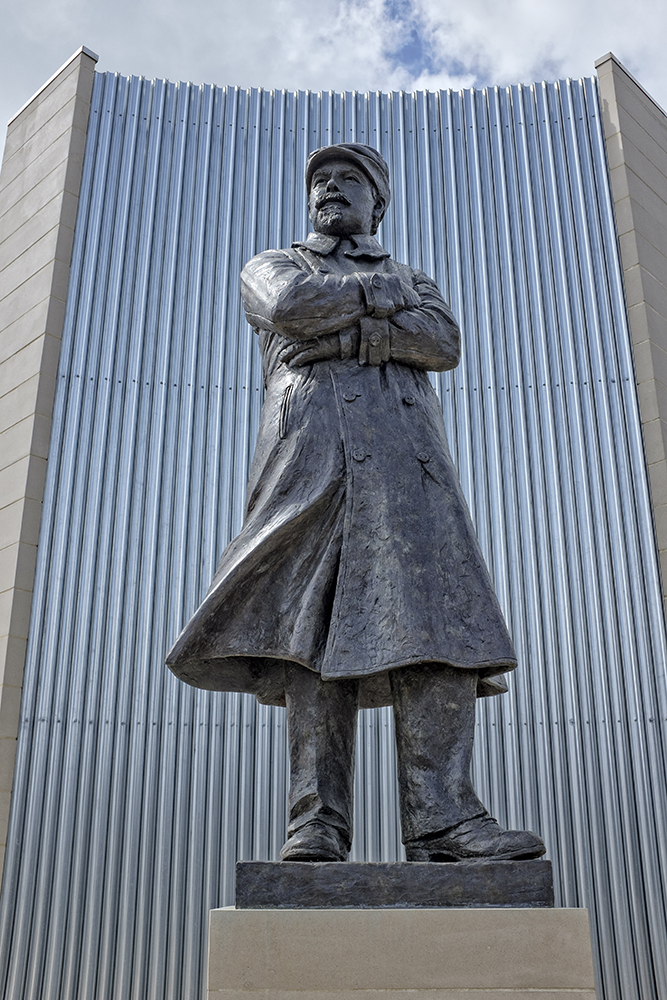
Cody's commemorative statue at the Farnborough Air Sciences Trust Museum

A commemorative statue of Cody, adjacent to the Farnborough Air Sciences Trust Museum, was unveiled by 94-year-old Captain Eric "Winkle" Brown in August 2013. The Cody Technology Park and the Cody Cricket Club, both at Farnborough, are named after him. His former house in Ash Vale, Surrey is marked by a blue plaque.

The Aldershot Military Museum has artefacts relating to Cody.

=== The Cody Tree ===
When Cody was testing his first aeroplane, he tied it to a tree in order to assess the pulling power of its propeller. The tree became known as the Cody Tree and survived for many years. Later an aluminium replica was cast by apprentices of the Royal Aircraft Establishment, and for many years continued to mark the spot. The metal tree was eventually moved to its present location.

=== Replica aircraft ===
A team of volunteer enthusiasts built a full-sized replica of British Army Aeroplane No 1 to commemorate the 100th anniversary of the first flight. It is on permanent display at the Farnborough Air Sciences Trust Museum in Farnborough. The display is about three hundred metres from the take-off point of the historic flight.

=== The Broomfield hoax ===
G. A. Broomfield had been an assistant and friend to Cody after he left the Army and moved to Laffan's Plain. In 1948, he presented to the Science Museum, Kensington, a model of the No.1 machine which was wrong in many details. He claimed that the first flight had been in May 1908. This was one month before a similar claimed first flight by A. V. Roe, and Broomfield wanted to establish primacy for Cody. Roe's claim was later disallowed, but by then Broomfield was too deep in his story to back out.

The next year, Broomfield made the same claim to the Royal Aircraft Establishment, and caused a new plaque with the date of 16 May 1908 to be made for the Cody Tree. The story first appeared in print in 1951, and again in 1952, in articles published by independent researchers. A fuller account of the fictitious day's flying appeared in Broomfield's biography of Cody, Pioneer of the Air, 1953. It was endorsed by Geoffrey de Havilland who provided the foreword and C. G. Grey, editor of the journal Aeroplane, who wrote the Introduction. The hoax was not exposed until 1958, the 50th anniversary of flight in Britain, when three investigators, G. W. B. Lacey from the Science Museum, A. T. E. Bray from the R.A.E. and the independent historian Charles Gibbs-Smith, asked Broomfield for clarifications.
