= Cody Floatplane =

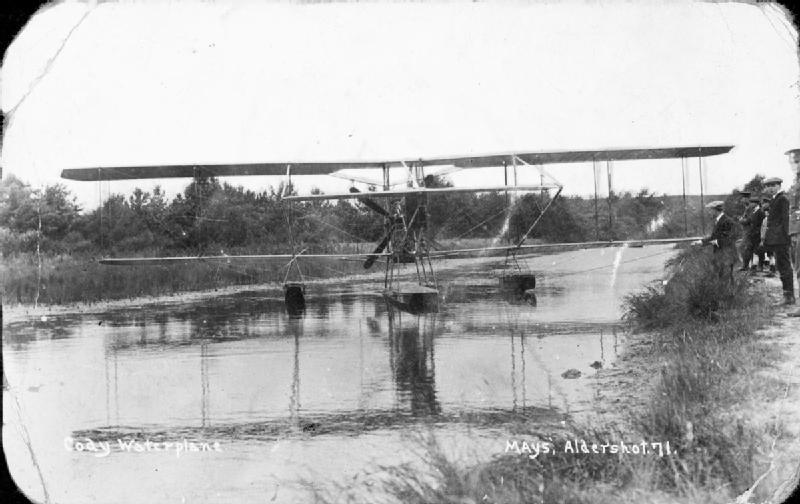
- Cody Hydroplane on the Basingstoke Canal

General information
- Type: Floatplane
- National origin: United Kingdom
- Manufacturer: Samuel Franklin Cody
- Designer: Samuel Franklin Cody
- Status: Prototype only
- Number built: 1

History
- First flight: 14 July 1913

The Cody Floatplane (also referred to as the Cody Hydro-biplane) was designed and built by Samuel Franklin Cody as an entrant in the 1913 Daily Mail Circuit of Britain race, which offered a prize of £5,000. On 7 August 1913 the aircraft suffered a structural failure during flight trials and both Cody and his passenger were killed.

== Design and development ==
The Cody Floatplane was a three-bay biplane of orthodox design for an aircraft of its time, with a single elevator operated by a bamboo push-rod mounted on booms in front of the wing and a single rudder and small horizontal stabiliser on booms behind it. Lateral control was effected by wing-warping. Power was provided by a 100 hp (75 kW) Green engine mounted on the wing centre section driving a 10.75 ft (3.28 m) diameter Garuda propeller via a chain. Pilot and passenger were seated in tandem in front of the wing, using Cody's preferred metal seats, of the type used on agricultural machinery. The arrangement of the controls was unconventional by present-day standards: all the control surfaces were operated by a control column and wheel, and the throttle and engine ignition were controlled using foot pedals. It was fitted with one large central float with three steps and a pair of smaller stabilising floats positioned below the inboard interplane struts.

The machine was completed in July 1913, and made its maiden flight as a landplane on 14 July 1913. It was fitted with its floats and carried out flotation tests on the Basingstoke Canal at Mytchett on 30 July. The floats were then removed and replaced again by skids and wheels for more flight trials. Early on the morning of 7 August Cody carried out a 70-mile (113 km) test flight, with the plan of flying down to Calshot, Southampton, where the aircraft would be fitted with its floats to carry out test flights from water. He agreed, however, to give a flight to the Hampshire cricketer William Evans and took off at 10:30 am with Evans as a passenger. After about eight minutes the aircraft broke up in the air at a height of about 200 ft (60 m) with Cody and Evans, who were not strapped in, being thrown out of the aircraft. Both were killed. The Royal Aero Club accident investigation concluded that the accident was due to "inherent structural weakness", and suggested that Cody and Evans might have survived the crash if strapped in.

== Specifications ==
Data from British Aircraft 1808–1914

General characteristics

- Crew: one
- Capacity: one passenger
- Length: 40 ft 9 in (12.42 m)
- Wingspan: 59 ft 6 in (18.14 m)
- Wing area: 770 sq ft (72 m^{2})
- Powerplant: 1 × Green Engine Co 6-cylinder inline water-cooled, 100 hp (75 kW)
- Propellers: 4-bladed, 10 ft 8 in (3.25 m) diameter

Performance

- Maximum speed: 70 mph (110 km/h, 61 kn)

== Bibliography ==
- "Accidents Investigation Committee of the Royal Aero Club: Report No. 17". Flight (20 September 1913): 1040.
- Jarrett, Philip (July–August 1999). "Cody and his Aeroplanes: Samuel Franklin Cody: His Life and Times". Air Enthusiast (82): 6–17. ISSN 0143-5450.
- Lewis, Peter (1962). British Aircraft 1809–1914. London: Putnam Publishing.
- "The Cody Waterplane". Flight (16 August 1913): 894–896.
