= Maurice Tabuteau =

French aviator and racing driver (1884–1976)

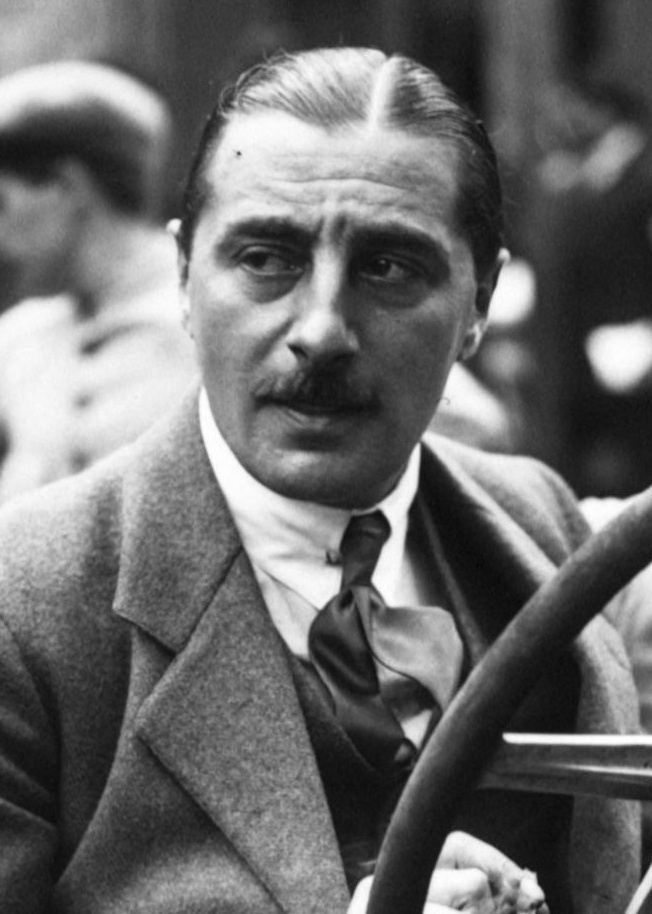
- Tabuteau at the 1914 French Grand Prix
- Born: April 28, 1884; Paris
- Died: June 14, 1976 (aged 92); Massy
- Resting place: Chavenay
- Known for: Aviator, racing driver
- Aviation career
- Flight license: 1 July 1910; France

Maurice Tabuteau (1884–1976) was a pioneering French aviator and racing driver. He set multiple international aviation records for both speed and distance in 1910 and 1912. Tabuteau also won the Michelin Cup in 1910.

== Bibliography ==
- Tabuteau, Denys B. (2000). Maurice Tabuteau, pionnier de l’aviation: d’après les documents inédits de Maurice Tabuteau 1884-1976: son carnet de route, sa correspondance, ses albums photos, ses articles de presse: les débuts de l’aviation : 1910, 1911, 1912 [Maurice Tabuteau, Pioneer of Aviation: According to the Unpublished Documents of Maurice Tabuteau 1884-1976: His Logbook, His Correspondence, His Photo Albums, His Press Articles: The Beginnings of Aviation: 1910, 1911, 1912] (in French). Le Mée-sur-Seine: Lys Éditions-Éditions Amatteis. ISBN 2-86849-194-4.
- Tabuteau, Maurice (July 1988). "Moi, Maurice Tabuteau, aviateur professionel en 1910" [I, Maurice Tabuteau, Professional Aviator in 1910]. Le Fana de l'Aviation (in French) (224): 42–45. ISSN 0757-4169.
