= British Army Aeroplane No 1 =

1907 biplane, made first powered and sustained flight in the UK

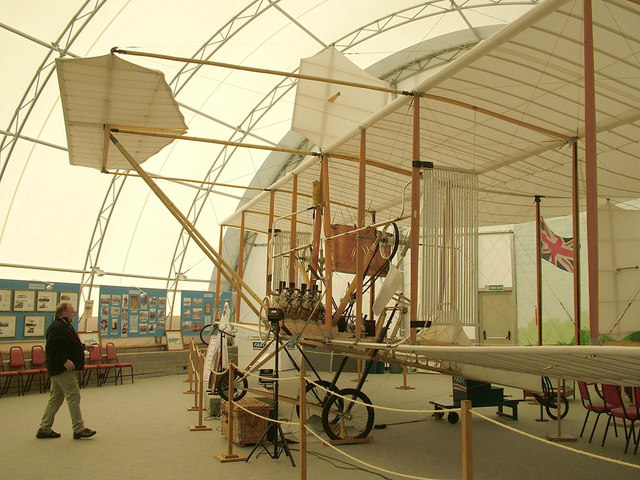
- Replica of Aeroplane No 1 as first flown, at the FAST Museum

General information
- Type: Experimental biplane
- Manufacturer: Army Balloon Factory
- Designer: Samuel Franklin Cody
- Number built: 1

History
- First flight: 16 October 1908

The British Army Aeroplane No 1 or sometimes Cody 1 was a biplane built by Samuel Franklin Cody in 1907 at the Army Balloon Factory at Farnborough. It made the first recognised powered and sustained flight in the United Kingdom on 16 October 1908.

== Background ==
In the early years of the twentieth century, the British Army's limited interest in aeronautical matters was largely confined to the use of tethered balloons or kites for artillery observation purposes. Many people did not believe the Wright Brothers' claims of sustained controlled flight, and in 1907 an officially sanctioned experiment at the Balloon Factory, Farnborough, was limited to the building of the Dirigible No. 1 Nulli Secundus, which was the Army's first powered airship, under the supervision of Colonel J. E. Capper, the superintendent of the factory. In addition some highly secret experiments with gliders were being carried out at Blair Atholl in Scotland by J. W. Dunne in collaboration with Capper. In late 1907 the Director of Fortifications, Capper's immediate superior, was persuaded to allow the use of some of the Balloon Factory's resources for the construction of a powered aircraft, to be designed and built by the American Samuel Franklin Cody, who was at that time working with Capper on the Nulli Secundus.

== Development and design ==
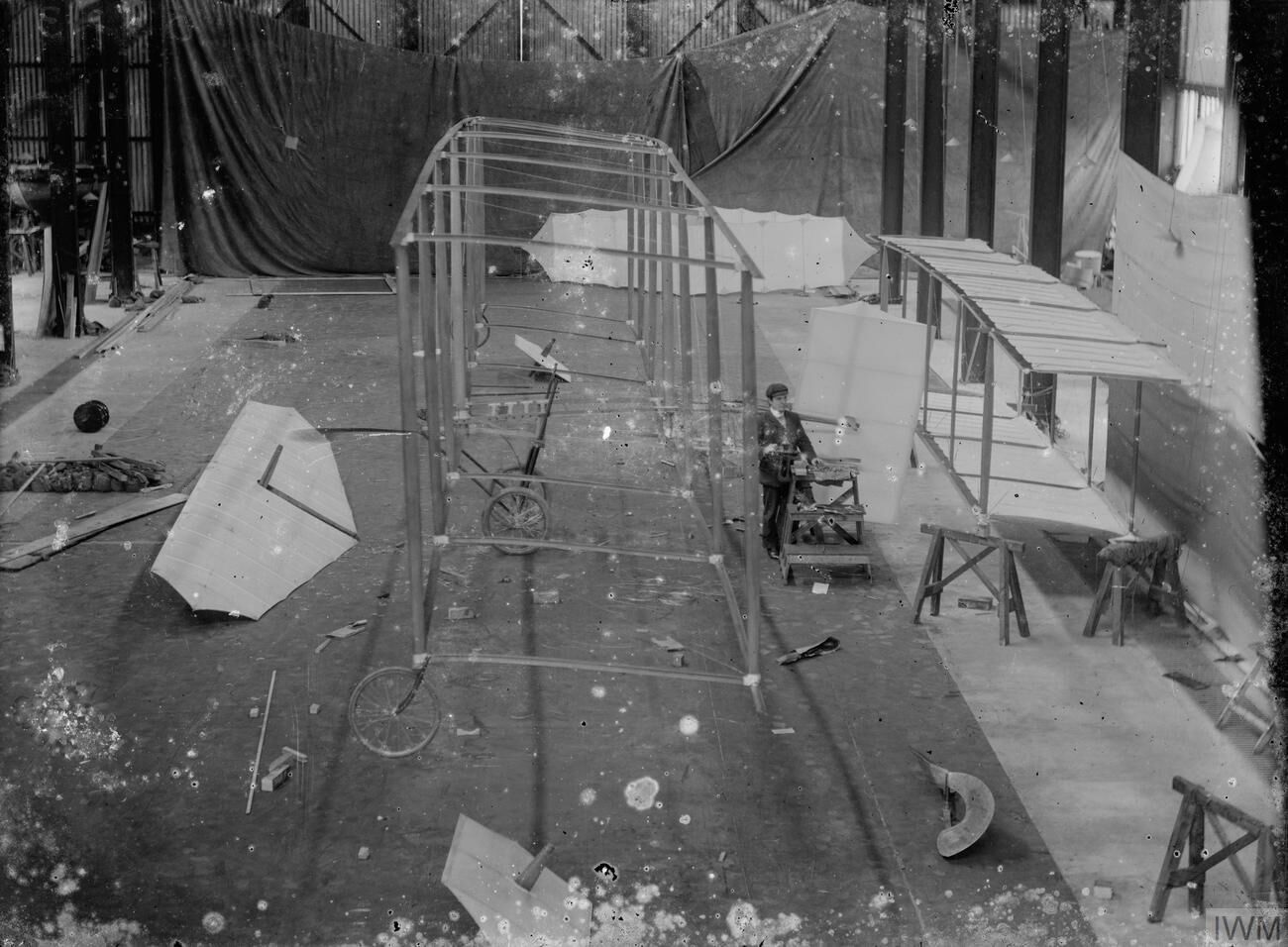
The Army Aeroplane in course of construction

The Army Aeroplane No. 1 was a biplane of similar configuration to that designed by the Wright brothers, being a three bay biplane with horizontal control surfaces mounted in front of the wings and a rudder behind; but was larger, with a wingspan of 52 ft (16 m).

The aircraft had a long history of alterations, but as first built it had a short square-section wire-braced wood fuselage, with the engine mounted on top in front of the leading edge of the lower wing, with the pilot's seat behind it. A pair of V struts at the front carried two wheels on an axle, and a tailwheel was mounted at the back. This was augmented by small wheels mounted on the leading edge on the lower wingtips. The wings had wooden spars at the leading and trailing edges and had an arrangement for altering the camber when on the ground by means of tensioned wires between the spars. The wings were connected by streamlined interplane struts, some wind-tunnel experiments on strut sections having been carried out at Farnborough. Lateral control was to be achieved using a pair of small ailerons mounted above the leading edge of the lower wing. The forward-mounted elevator was mounted on three sets of bamboo booms attached to sockets on the leading edge of the wings, the lower members sloping steeply upwards so that the surfaces were just below the level of the upper wing. These could be operated in conjunction to act as elevators as well as assisting in the lateral control of the aircraft. A single rectangular rudder was mounted between two booms, the upper attached to the centre of the rear spar and the lower to the rear of the fuselage. A large canvas triangle was stretched between the trailing edge of the upper wing and the end of the upper tail boom. A small fixed vertical surface was also mounted above the upper wing.

The engine drove a pair of tractor propellers using a belt drive. Twin radiators were vertically mounted in a V configuration. The original intention had been to use a 50 hp Panhard-Levassor engine, but this proved unreliable when bench tested. Lacking funding for a new engine, Cody had to wait until the 50 hp (37 kW) Antoinette engine which had been fitted to the Nulli Secundus became available. This happened in August 1908, when Cody transferred the engine to his aircraft.

== Operational history ==
=== First flight and Army career ===
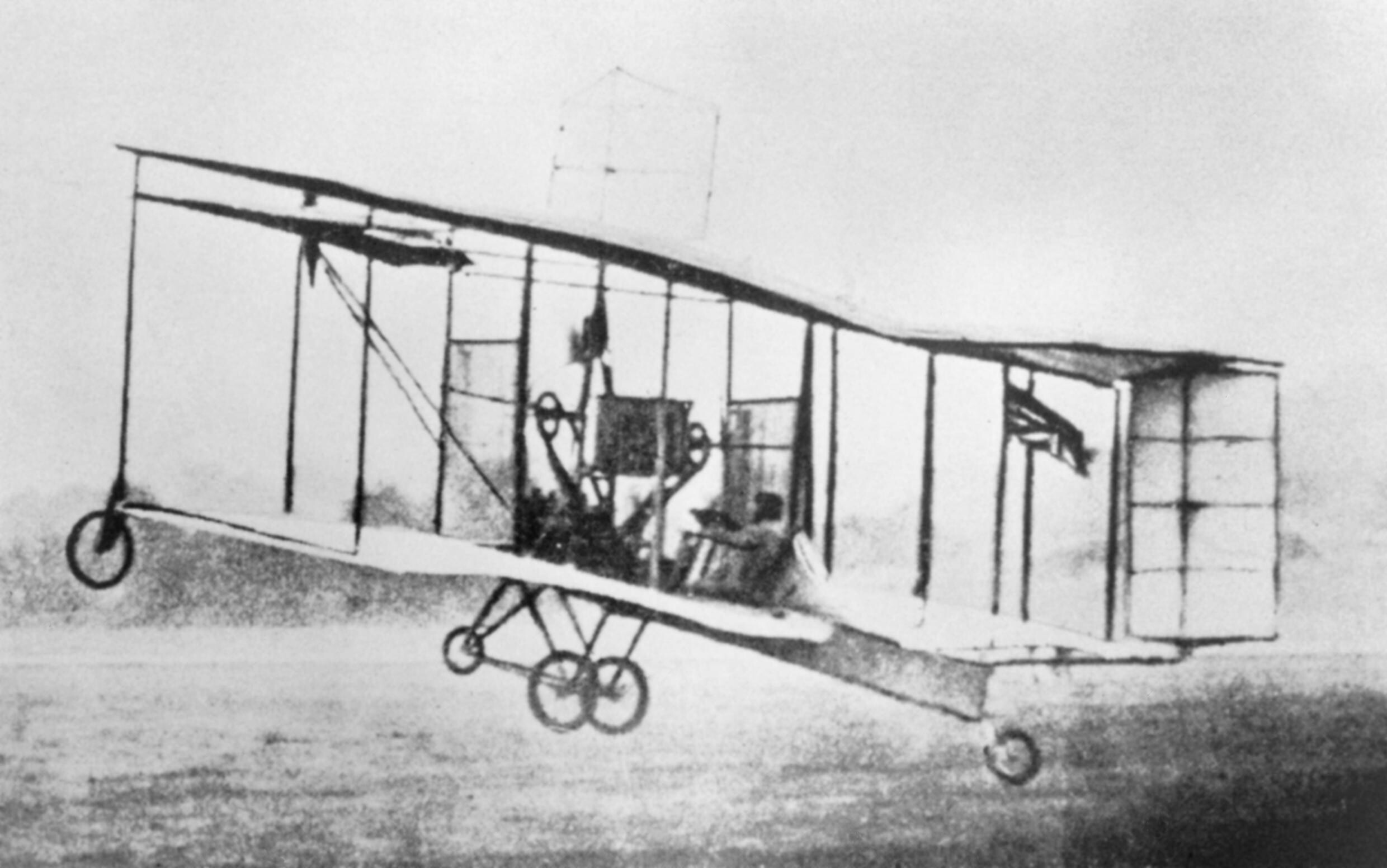
The first sustained flight in the UK

Cody's friend, assistant and biographer G. A. Broomfield would later claim that the first flight took place in May 1908. A. V. Roe was at that time claimed to have flown in June 1908 and Broomfield wanted to give primacy to Cody. Both claims were later disallowed, with Broomfield's claim for Cody being exposed as an outright hoax.

Cody carried out taxiing trials of the aircraft during September, briefly leaving the ground on the last of these. The aircraft was then returned to the workshop for the first of a long series of modifications to be made. The small ailerons were removed, a nosewheel added, the radiators moved outboard from their central position to the forward interplane struts, and modifications were made to the booms supporting the elevator. In this form, with a Union Jack flying from the strut between the upper and lower tail booms, the aircraft was presented to the press at Farnborough on 13 October. After further ground trials Cody finally judged conditions suitable for a flight trial on 16 October, and made the first recognised powered and sustained flight in the United Kingdom, which covered only 1,390 ft (424 m).

The flight of 16 October ended when Cody attempted a turn to avoid trees and a wingtip touched the ground. The resulting crash caused substantial damage, and the rest of the year was spent in repairing it and making major modifications. The gap between the wings was increased from 8 ft (2.44 m) to 9 ft (2.74 m), the booms carrying both sets of control surfaces lengthened, and provision for lateral control made by installing a wing-warping system and fitting differentially-moving surfaces at each end of the elevator. The radiators were moved to the aft interplane struts, the triangle of canvas that had stretched between the trailing edge of the upper wing and the top of the rudder was removed, and the small vertical stabiliser was moved from above the top wing to a position between the centre booms supporting the elevator, and linked to the rudder control. New larger propellers were fitted.

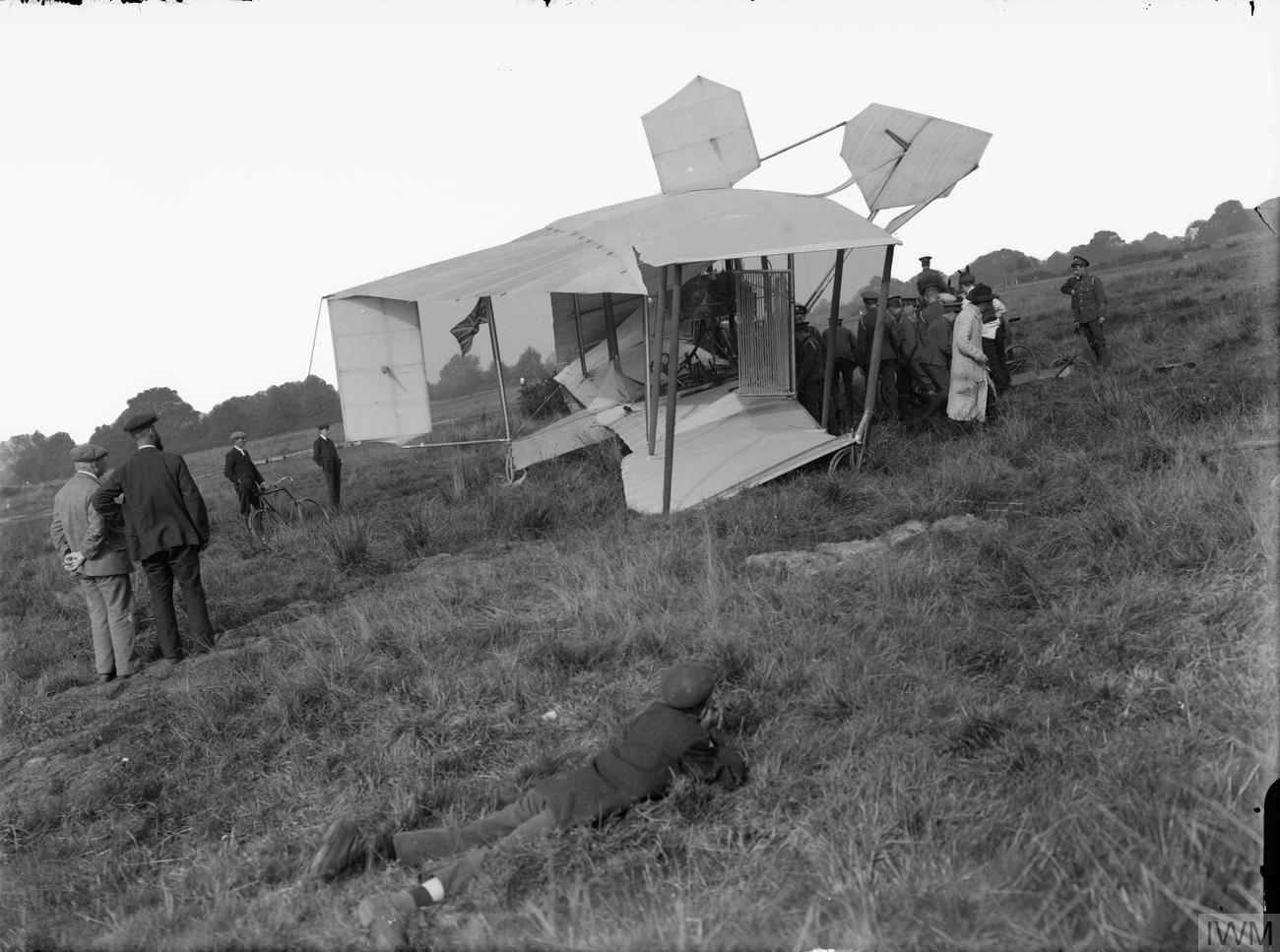
The Army Aeroplane after Cody's first flight

On 6 January 1909 this work was complete and testing continued, on this occasion with a number of streamers attached so that the airflow might be observed. More ground trials were made, the ailerons moved to a position in the middle of the aft interplane struts, and the radiators moved forward slightly to adjust the aircraft's trim. In this form Cody made another flight on 20 January covering about 1,200 ft (370 m) and reaching a height of 25 ft (7.6 m) but crashed after a turn, Cody being unhurt. The aircraft was again taken back to the factory for alterations and repairs. The ailerons were discarded and a pair of horizontal stabilisers were fitted in front of the rudder. Cody flew the aircraft again on 18 February, this time landing with no more damage than a burst tyre and a broken rigging wire. Further successful flights were made on 22 February, after which the rear stabilisers were removed and the ailerons repositioned, now being placed on short outriggers trailing from the forward interplane struts, and the front rudder was moved to a position above the elevator.

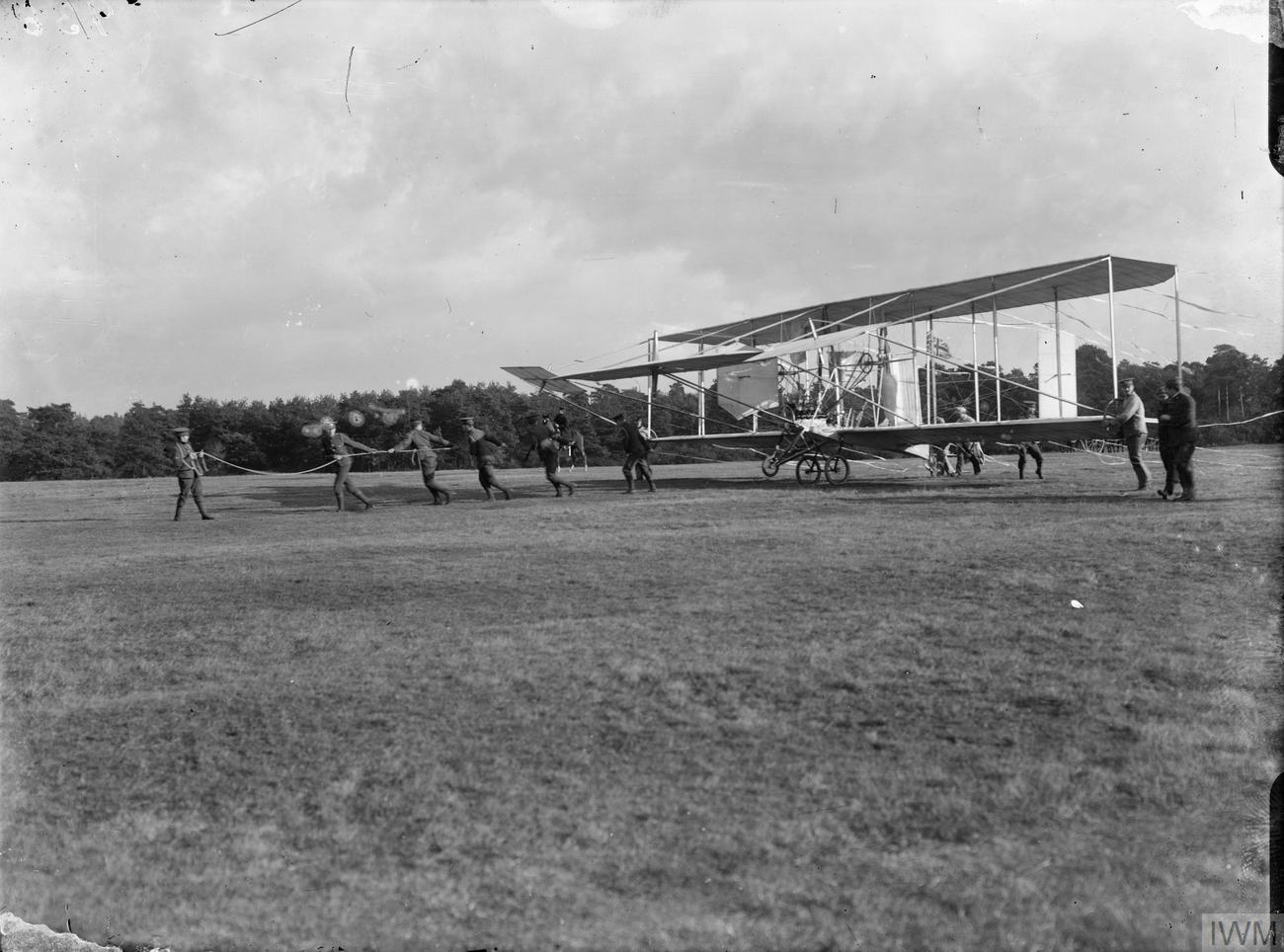
The Army Aeroplane No.1 in January 1909. Note the streamers attached to the wings

Despite the fact that Cody's aircraft could now be considered a success, in February 1909 a report by the Aerial Navigation Sub-Committee of the Committee of Imperial Defence had recommended that all government-funded heavier-than air experimentation should stop, leaving development to the private sector. Funding was to be provided for the construction of airships; official support for anything else was limited to toleration of aviation activities on some government land. If Cody wished to develop the aircraft further he would have to do so at his own expense and not as an employee of the Balloon Factory. Cody's contract, due for renewal that September, was not renewed, but he was allowed to keep the aircraft, now officially surplus to requirements, and to continue to use Laffan's Plain for flight testing. The Army were left with only a set of drawings of the Army Aeroplane No. 1 labelled "Top secret", possibly the earliest full set of technical drawings for an aircraft.

=== Subsequent use ===
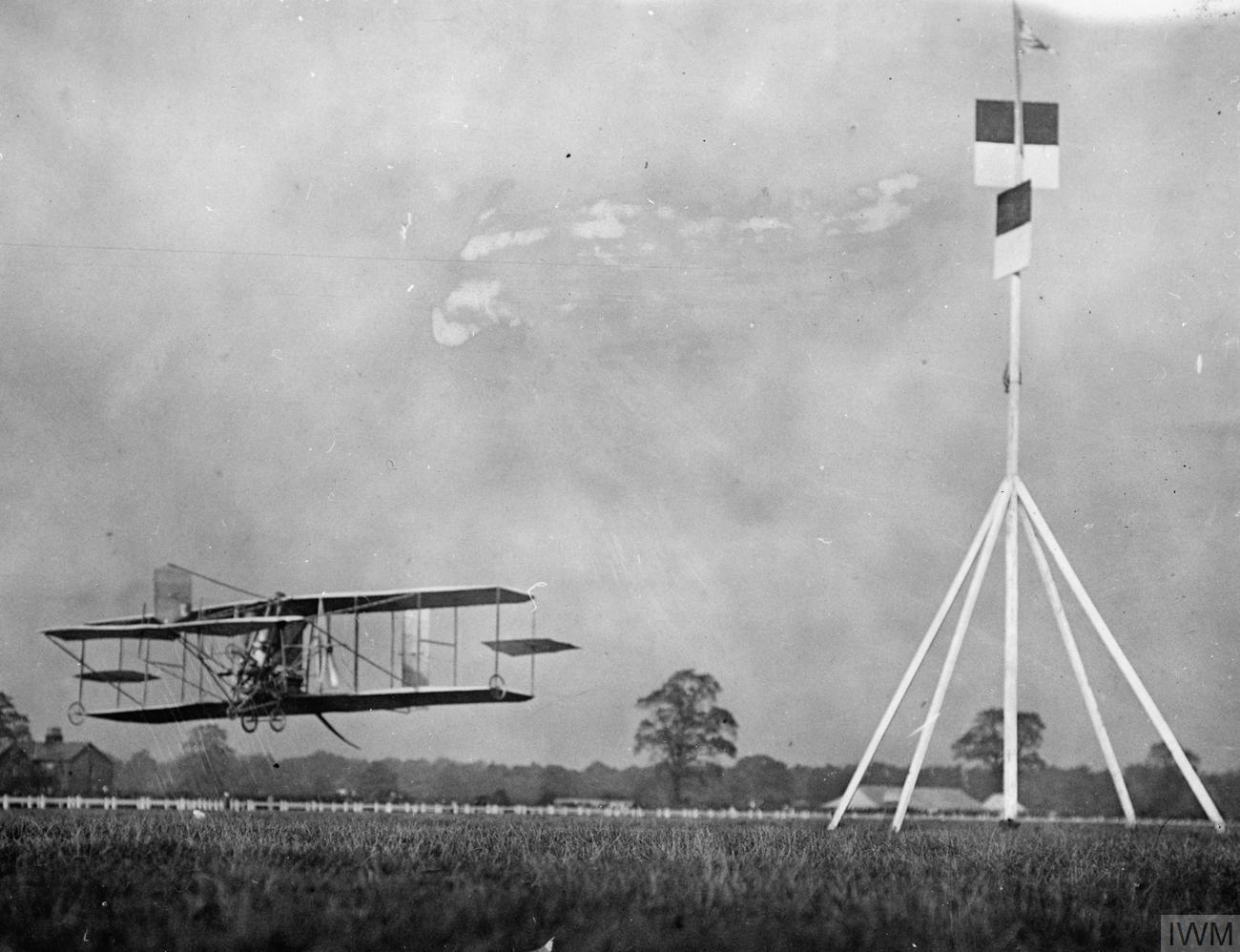
Cody at the Doncaster Aero Meeting

Cody's personal relationship with Capper was unharmed, and he continued to operate the aircraft at Farnborough. On 14 May 1909 he made a flight of over a mile between Laffan's Plain and Danger Hill. Later the same day he attempted to repeat the performance at the request of the Prince of Wales, who was observing Army manoeuvres at Aldershot. Unluckily, on takeoff he was caught by a gust as he turned the machine to avoid some troops on the ground, and was forced to land, the aircraft sustaining some damage to the tail. The Prince was nevertheless satisfied, telling Cody of his pleasure at seeing a British aeroplane that could fly.

Back in the workshop, Cody made further adjustments, discarding the twin rudders and moving the radiators so that they were now in front of the front interplane struts. The tailwheel was removed and replaced by a substantial skid. In mid-July Cody flew the aircraft again, managing to complete a circular flight of four miles on 21 July, after which he decided to fit a 60 hp E.N.V. Type F engine. Importantly, the position of the pilot and engine were exchanged: the pilots seat now being directly in front of the leading edge of the wing, and the engine above it. The position of the ailerons was also adjusted; the outriggers were removed, the ailerons now being directly mounted on the forward interplane struts.

Apart from very minor adjustments, this was the aircraft's final form. It was flown for three miles on 11 August. Cody was initially startled by the experience provided by the new seating position, recording "I find my new position in front of the engine has a much more sensational effects on the nerves than the old position, in fact until last night I never knew I had any nerves. I think, however, I shall get over this slight timidness after a few runs". but the aircraft was now performing well and after several flights on 13 August Cody considered it safe enough to take a passenger. The next day this honour went to Capper, and later that day Cody took his wife for a three-mile flight, making her the first woman to fly in an aeroplane in the United Kingdom.

On 8 September 1909 he made a flight lasting over an hour, covering around 40 miles (64 km), landing because he was out of fuel. He also flew the aircraft at the Doncaster Flight Meeting in October 1909. Although he did not win any of the prizes on offer, Cody made use of his appearance to publicly take British citizenship on 28 October, and promptly entered his name for the Daily Mail prize for the first British aircraft to make a circular flight of over a mile. However, the Doncaster meeting had not been sanctioned by the Royal Aero Club, and so any flights made there could not be officially ratified, and the prize was eventually won by J.T.C. Moore-Brabazon on 30 October.

In January Cody had hoped to win the £1,000 prize offered by Sir William Hartley for a flight between Manchester and Liverpool, which had to be made before 26 January. Although he took the aircraft to Aintree, his attempt was prevented by fog. After this flight Cody concentrated his efforts on the new aircraft he was building, the Cody Michelin Cup Biplane.

== Nomenclature ==
Originally Cody's aircraft was officially called the Army Aeroplane No. 1. After the War Office stopped supporting Cody's experiments, it was simply referred to as the Cody Flyer or the equivalent. Any attempt to describe its various forms as the Cody 2 and so forth run the risk of confusing this aircraft with subsequent aircraft built by Cody, and were certainly not used in contemporary sources. Subsequent aircraft tend to be referred to as "Mr Cody's new aeroplane", subsequently being known by his most notable achievement in the aircraft, as in the Cody Michelin Cup Biplane. To further confuse matters the name "Cody Cathedral" is indiscriminately used both for this aircraft and for the 1912 Cody V also known as the "Military Trials Biplane".

== Replica ==
A full-size replica was built in 2008 by a large team of volunteers at the Farnborough Air Sciences Trust. It was not designed to be flown, but attempted to reproduce faithfully the materials and construction of the original.

== Specifications ==
Data from Biplanes, Triplanes, and Seaplanes

General characteristics

- Crew: 1
- Length: 38 ft 6 in (11.73 m)
- Wingspan: 52 ft 4 in (15.85 m)
- Height: 13 ft 0 in (3.96 m)
- Wing area: 640 sq ft (59.46 m^{2})
- Powerplant: 1 × Antoinette , 50 hp (37 kW)

Performance

- Maximum speed: 65 mph (105 km/h, 56 kn)

== See also ==
- List of accidents and incidents involving military aircraft

Aircraft of comparable role, configuration, and era

- 1909 Wright Military Flyer (USA)
