= Michelin Cup =

Aviation award

The Michelin Cup refers to a number of competitions sponsored by the French tyre manufacturer Michelin for long-distance flight made in aeroplanes.

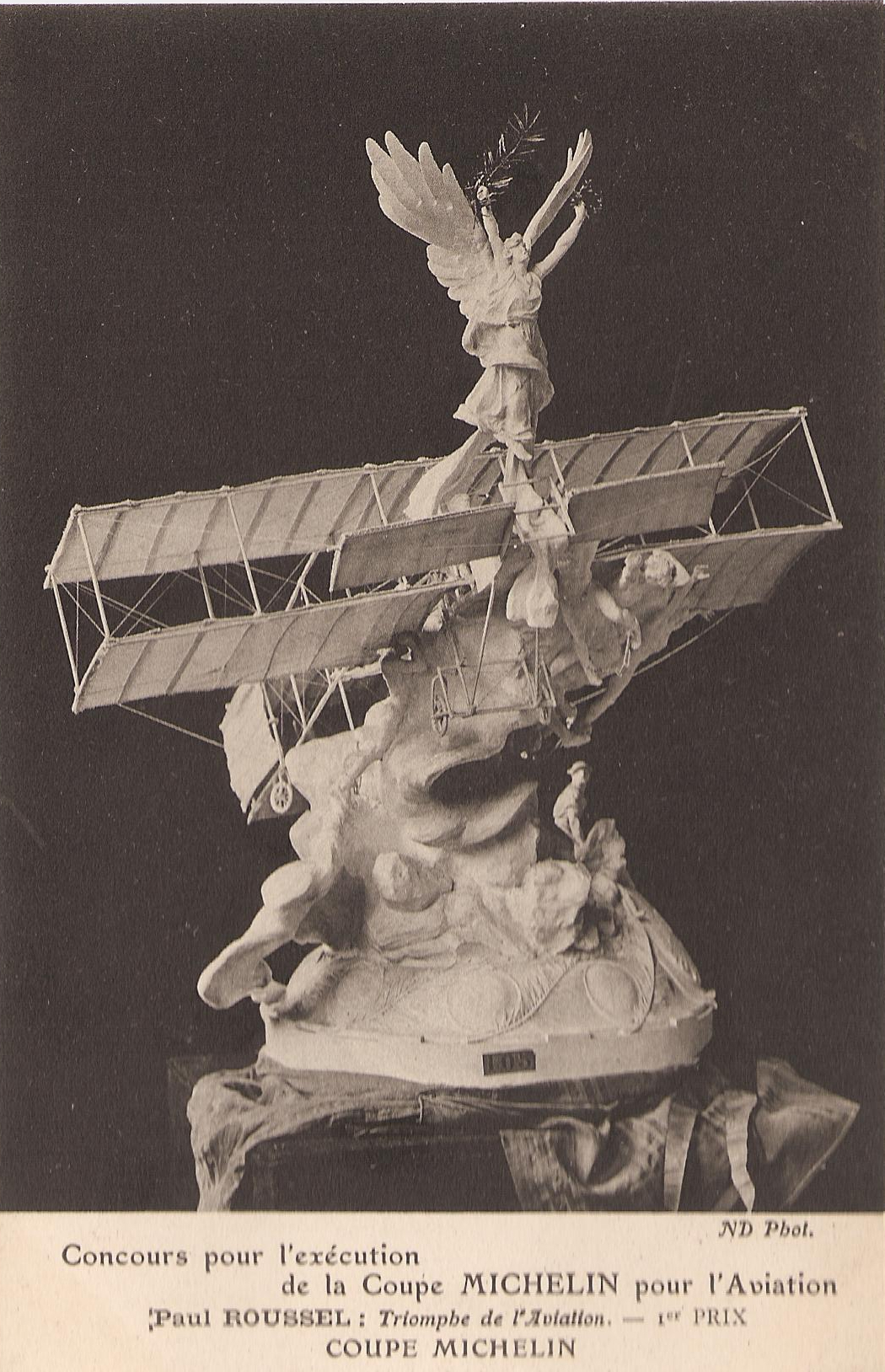

The first Michelin prize was announced in March 1908. The principal prize, to be awarded annually for an initial period of eight years, was a prize for long distance flight, and consisted of a bronze statue as a trophy (valued at 10,000 FF-French francs) and a money prize of 20,000 FF. The flying club of the winner also received a replica of the trophy if they did not already own one. Administration and determination of the exact conditions for each year were delegated to the Aéro-Club de France (AeCF). Attempts to win the prize could be made anywhere in the world where there was a flying club associated with the AeCF.

At the same time, Prix d'Aviation Michelin was a special prize of 100,000 francs offered for a flight by an aircraft carrying a passenger, taking off from either the department of Seine or Seine-et-Oise, flying over the Arc de Triomphe and the cathedral of Clermont-Ferrand, and landing on the summit of the 1,456 m (4,777 ft) Puy de Dôme inside six hours starting from the Arc de Triomphe. This was won by Eugène Renaux on 7 March 1911, flying a Farman MF.7 biplane.

In 1909, a second award, the British Empire Michelin Cup, was announced, for flights made by aviators who were citizens of the British Empire, flying aircraft of all-British manufacture. The original award therefore became known as the International Michelin Cup.

When the prizes were first instituted, 25 French francs were worth one pound Sterling.

== International Michelin Cup ==
=== 1908 ===
Won by Wilbur Wright with a flight made on 31 December 1908 at Le Mans. The course over which the flight was made was an isosceles triangle with two sides of 1 kilometre (0.62 mi) and a third of 200 metres (656 ft), totalling 2.2 kilometres (1.37 mi). The flight had to be made before sunset and only complete circuits counted. Wright took off at 2 pm and completed 56 circuits before sunset. He then landed, flying a further 1.5 kilometres (0.93 mi) to set a new world distance record officially reckoned as 124.7 km (77.5 mi).

=== 1909 ===
For the greatest distance exceeding 123.2 km. in a closed circuit made before the end of the year: 20,000 francs, and a bronze replica of the Michelin trophy.

Won by Henry Farman with a flight of 234.212 km (145.533 mi) lasting 4h 6m 25s made on 3 November 1909 at Chalons.

=== 1910 ===
Won by Maurice Tabuteau flying a Farman MF.7 biplane with a flight of 584.745 km (363.344 mi) at Buc on 30 December 1910, taking 7hr 48m 36.6s.

=== 1911 ===
In 1911, the closing date for the competition was brought forward to 31 October.

Won by Emmanuel Helen flying a Nieuport II monoplane on 8 September 1911, when he covered 1,252.8 km (778.5 mi) in 14 hr 7 min.

=== 1912 ===
For the 1912 competition, the rules were considerably more elaborate. The flight had to be made over a course made up of three different circuits, each starting from the same point. The first and third, each of about 500 km (310 mi), had to have three or four compulsory landing-places, and the second, of 255 km (158 mi), one or two landing places. Refuelling was only allowed at the starting point of each circuit. The circuits had to be covered in order, and if a competitor landed somewhere other than a nominated airfield, they had to start that circuit again. For every 75 kilograms (165 lb) of useful load carried apart from the pilot and necessary fuel, a bonus of 25% was allowed on the time, up to a maximum of 100 per cent. The extra load could be made up of passengers or ballast. Competing aircraft had to carry a sealed barograph, and an average speed of at least 40 km/h (25 mph) had to be maintained.

The 1912 prize was not won by any competitor, and the prize money was added to the prize for the following year.

=== 1913 ===
The 1913 competition was very different. It was awarded for the greatest distance flown on a series of consecutive days, flying over a 100 km (62 mi) course, with a compulsory landing after each circuit.

The Cup was won by Emmanuel Helen flying a Nieuport monoplane, with a total distance of 16,096.6 km (10,002.0 mi) flown between 22 October and 29 November 1913.

=== 1914 ===
The nature of the competition was changed again for the 1914 competition, the prize being awarded for the fastest time over a circuit of about 3,000 km (1,864 mi). Won by Eugène Gilbert flying a Morane-Saulnier monoplane. Starting from Villacoublay at 03:04 on 8 June 1914, he flew via Peronne, Rheims, Saint-Dizier, Gray, Joigny, Beaune, Vienne and Nimes, landing at Mirande before reaching Pau, owing to running out of fuel. On the next day he flew via Pau, St. André de Cubzac, Romorantin, Angers, Evreux and Calais back to Villacoublay, landing at 18:37 p.m, having covered a distance of 2,970 km (1,845 mi) in 39h 35m.

=== 1921 ===
After the First World War, the competition was resumed in 1921. The competition was for the fastest time over a 3,000 kilometres (1,864 mi) circuit: the French circuit was Versailles—Amiens—Mourmelon-le-Grand—Saint-Dizier—Dijon—Joigny—Beaune—Lyon—Nîmes—Pau—Bordeaux–Romorantin,—Angers—Évreux—Calais—Versailles, and the aircraft had to land at each of these airfields.

The result was the cause of considerable controversy. The best French time was achieved by Alphonse Poiré flying a Caudron C.60, who completed the circuit in 37h 23m. A faster time of 35h 45m over an Italian circuit was achieved by Capt Raffaele Martinetti-Bianchi, but he had not landed at the same aerodrome as he had departed from, since this had become waterlogged and he was not allowed to land there. The dispute between the Italian authorities, who had ratified his performance, and the Aéro-Club de France was taken to a specially appointed Fédération Aéronautique Internationale committee, which found in Martinetti's favour, but the AeCF disputed their judgement: eventually the prize was held to have been won by neither man, although in recognition of his performance the AeCF awarded the Gold Medal of the AeCF and a sum of money equal to the Michelin Prize to Poiré.

=== 1922–23 ===
A five-year extension, with annual prizes of 20,000 francs, was announced in 1922. The time period of the annual competition was altered to run from the beginning of July in one year to the end of the following June.

Won by Capt Girier flying a Breguet 14, taking 20hr 41m 57sec, covering the course Lyon—Nimes—Pau—Bordeaux—Angers—St. Inglevert—Mourmelon—Metz—Strasbourg—Dijon—Avord—Lyon at an average speed (including time on the ground) of 136.2 km/h (84.6 mph).

=== 1923–24 ===
The 1924 French circuit was Versailles—Saint-Inglevert—Valenciennes—Mourmelon—Metz—Strasbourg—Dijon—Clermont-Ferrand—Lyon—Nimes—Toulouse—Pau—Bordeaux—Angers—Versailles

Won by Lieut. Ludovic Arrachart flying a Breguet 19, completing the 2,935 km (1,824 mi) in 19h 22m 26s.

=== 1924–25 ===
Won by Pelletier d'Oisy flying a Blériot-SPAD S.61, completing the course in 15h 8m.

=== 1925–26 ===
At the request of the military aviation authorities, the 1925-6 competition was limited to competitors flying the principal French bombing aircraft, the Breguet 19. The best time was achieved by Capt. Coslin, with Lieut Gérard as observer, with a time of 18h 0m 24s, a speed of 163.6 km/h (101.7 mph).

However, since this time did not better the previous best, the cup did not change hands.

=== 1926–27 ===
There were two competitions in 1926–27, one restricted to the Breguet 19. The course for both competitions was Paris (Le Bourget)—Nancy—Metz—Strasbourg—Dijon—Bourges—Clermont-Ferrand—Lyon—Istres—Pau—Casaux—Châteauroux—Tours—Romorantin—Chartres—Paris, a distance of 2,727.5 km (1,694.8 mi).

The main competition was won by Capitain Challes flying a Blériot-SPAD S.61 in 12h 14m 37s.

The military competition was won by Capt Delaître and Sgt Cailloge, who covered the course in 14h 51m 55s, a speed of 187.95 km/h (116.79 mph).

=== 1927–28 ===
Again, the competition was restricted to the Breguet 19, with the added condition that an altitude of 4,000 m (13,000 ft) be reached at least once.

Won by Capt. Delaître.

=== 1928–29 ===
In 1928, the prize was offered for a further four years. The winning flight had to be made in France, although the competition was open to all nationalities, and the competition was restricted to single-seater aircraft with an engine of 230 horsepower (172 kW) or less. A minimum average speed of 185 km/h (115 mph) had to be maintained over the circuit, including time spent on the ground at the fifteen cities making up the circuit. Won by Michel Détroyat, flying a Morane-Saulnier MS.230.

=== 1929–30 ===
Won by Michel Détroyat, flying a Morane-Saulnier MS.130, completing the 2,788 km (1,732 mi) course Paris (Le Bourget)—Reims—Nancy— Strasbourg—Dijon—Clermont-Ferrand—Lyon—Montpellier— Perpignan—Toulouse—Pau—Bordeaux—Tours—Le Bourget at an average speed of 190.2 km/h (118.2 mph).

=== 1930–31 ===
Won by Marcel Haegelen flying the Lorraine-Hanriot LH.41, with a time of 11h 37m 21s, an average speed of 226.45 km/h (140.71 mph).

=== 1931–32 ===
Won by Marcel Haegelen flying the Lorraine-Hanriot LH 41, completing the 2,631 km (1,635 mi) course at an average speed of 254 km/h (158 mph) on 23 June 1932.

=== 1932–33 ===
Won by Michel Détroyat flying a Moraine Saulnier MS.234, completing the 2,902 km (1,803 mi) course at an average speed of 222.537 km/h (138.278 mph).

=== 1935 ===
Won by Maurice Arnoux flying a Caudron C.430/1, completing the 2,902 km (1,803 mi) course in 10h 7m, a speed of 286.85 km/h (178.24 mph).

== British Michelin cup ==
In 1909, Michelin instituted a United Kingdom award, offering an annual award for five years of a trophy and £500. The competition was limited to British subjects flying aircraft of British construction. Administration of the competition was entrusted to the Aero Club of Great Britain.

=== 1909–10 ===
For the first year, the flight was to be around a closed circuit made up of two or more markers, and a minimum distance of 5 miles (8.0 km) was specified. The closing date for the first competition was 31 March 1910.

Won by J. T. C. Moore-Brabazon with a flight of 18.75 mi (30.18 km) at Eastchurch on 1 March 1910, flying the Short Biplane No. 2.

=== 1910 ===
The rules for the 1910 competition, for which the closing date was 31 December 1910, were as before except that the minimum qualifying distance was raised to 38 mi (61 km).

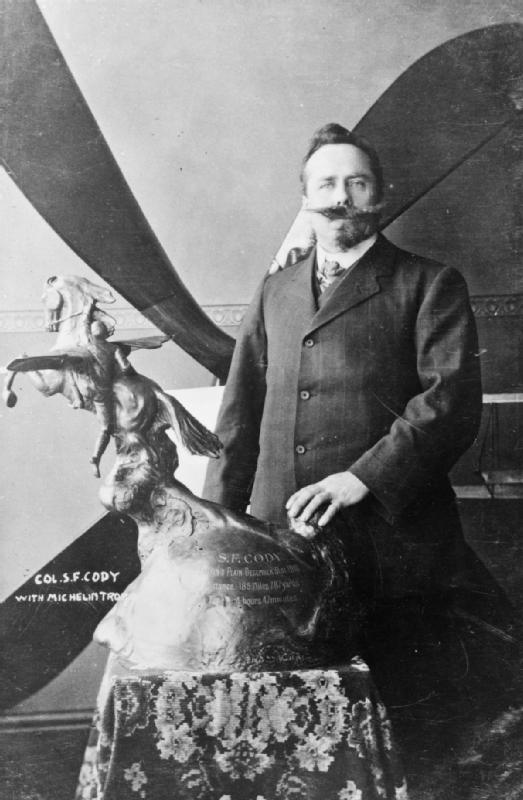
S F Cody shortly after winning his first Michelin Trophy in 1910

Won by Samuel Cody flying the Cody Michelin Cup Biplane at Laffan's Plain, Farnborough with a flight of 185.46 mi (298.47 km) taking 4h 47m.

=== 1911 ===
Announcement of a second prize, to be competed for during the following three years, with a trophy and a cash prize of £400 for 1911, £600 for 1912 and £800 for 1913, for the fastest time over a cross-country circuit.

On 29 October 1911, the Michelin Cup No. 1 was again won by Samuel Cody, flying his Circuit of Britain biplane 261.5 miles (420.8 km) in 5 hr 15 min at Laffan's Plain, also setting a new British duration record.

The No. 2 cup was also won by Cody, with a flight made on 11 September 1911 of a circuit starting at Laffan's Plain, Farnborough—Andover—Hendon—Brooklands—Farnborough, taking 3 hr 6 min 30 sec to complete the 125 miles (201 km) course.

=== 1912 ===
The rules were redefined for the 1912 competition: the No. 1 cup and cash prize of £5,000 was purely for endurance, all flying to be done between sunrise and sunset. The No. 2 cup and prize of £600 was for distance covered over a cross-country course of about 186 mi (299 km) of the competitor's choosing.

The No. 1 cup was won by Harry Hawker flying the Sopwith-Wright biplane, with a flight lasting 8 hours 23 minutes made on 24 October 1912 at Brooklands.

The No. 2 cup was won by Samuel Cody flying the Cody V, with a flight of 186 miles (299 km) in 3hr 26m.

=== 1913 ===
Michelin Cup No. 1 for the longest distance flight round the course Brooklands–Hendon–Farnborough, with a minimum distance of 300 miles (483 km). Competitors had to make periodical stops of not less than five minutes, with engine stopped, on completing an entire circuit of the course plus one section: e.g., starting from Brooklands the competitor would pass Hendon, Farnborough, Brooklands, and alight at Hendon. The prize had not been won by the closing date of 31 October 1913, so the closing date was extended to 14 November 1913.

The No. 1 Cup was won by Reginald H. Carr flying the Grahame White "Charabanc", with a flight of over 300 mi (483 km).

The No. 2 cup, for the fastest time round a circuit of the competitor's choice of about 450 kilometres (280 mi), was not awarded. Although the prize was carried over to the next year, competition was terminated by the outbreak of World War I.

== See also ==
- List of aviation awards
