= Aerial Wheel Syndicate Monoplane =

Aerial Wheel Monoplane

General information
- Type: Experimental monoplane
- National origin: United Kingdom
- Manufacturer: Aerial WheelSyndicate
- Designer: Ralph Platts and George Sturgess
- Number built: 1

The Aerial Wheel Monoplane was an experimental British aircraft built during 1912 in order to compete in the Military Aeroplane Competition which was to be held at Larkhill on Salisbury Plain in August of that year. It was not assembled in time, and the aircraft was not allowed to enter the competition.

== The Aerial Wheel ==
The Aerial Wheel was the brainchild of George Sturgess of Mablethorpe, Lincolnshire. It was a novel idea for the undercarriage of an aircraft, which Flight magazine had thought interesting enough to publish. Sturgess's explanation, accompanied by a photograph of a model appears in the issue dated 10 Dec 1910. His idea was in effect a wheel where only the rim revolves, using a pair of twelve-foot diameter hoops each of which would be free to rotate while being held in place by bearings mounted on a cradle of struts. The wing passed through the middle of the wheels. The intention was to produce a wheel that, having a large diameter, would easily roll over the rough grass surfaces that aircraft operated from at the time: ease of take off and landing from rough ground were prominent among the War Office requirements. Whatever the merits of the idea, it was far beyond the manufacturing and material technologies of the day.

== The Aerial Wheel Syndicate Monoplane ==
Sturgess's idea was incorporated into an aircraft built in Birmingham in collaboration with Ralph Platts, a keen member of the Birmingham Aero club who had successfully flown a canard glider of his own design during 1911. Platt is probably largely responsible for the airframe, which differs greatly from Sturgess's model. This was a tractor monoplane with a pair of his wheels. Neither wing nor tailplane have any dihedral, and there is no rudder. The aircraft that was built was of canard configuration, with swept wings that changed section and angle of incidence considerably between the roots and wingtips: deeply cambered inboard, and changing to a flatter section with upswept tips, producing wash-out to enhance stability. Stability would also have resulted from the dihedral of the wings. Lateral control was by wing-warping, the control wires being taken to the raked wingtips via kingposts. A small nacelle projecting forward from the wing housed the 50 hp (37 kW) N.E.C. engine driving the tractor propeller, behind which the pilot and passenger sat side by side at the leading edge of the wing. A monoplane elevator was carried on long booms in front of the aircraft. The undercarriage was now reduced to a single Aerial Wheel half above and half below the wing and passing through it just behind the cockpit, with its centre just aft of the propeller. It was supported by struts running back from the lower leading quadrant, and a pair of long skids trailing from the fuselage were fitted to stop it keeling over and damaging the wings. Whatever Platt contributed to the design, it was not a rudder: there seems to have been no provision for directional control. Although the aircraft was delivered to Larkhill in the stipulated 30 ft by 9 ft by 9 ft crate, its makers did not manage to assemble their aircraft before the actual flight trials were to begin, and it made no appearance of any sort.

== Specifications ==
Data from Lewis, P British Aircraft 1806-1914 p. 39 (linear dimensions scaled from drawing)

General characteristics

- Crew: 1
- Capacity: 1
- Length: 25 ft (7.6 m) (approx)
- Wingspan: 30 ft (9.1 m) (approx)
- Powerplant: 1 × N.E.C. , 50 hp (37 kW)
