= Cody Michelin Cup Biplane =

British 1910 experimental aircraft

Michelin Cup Biplane
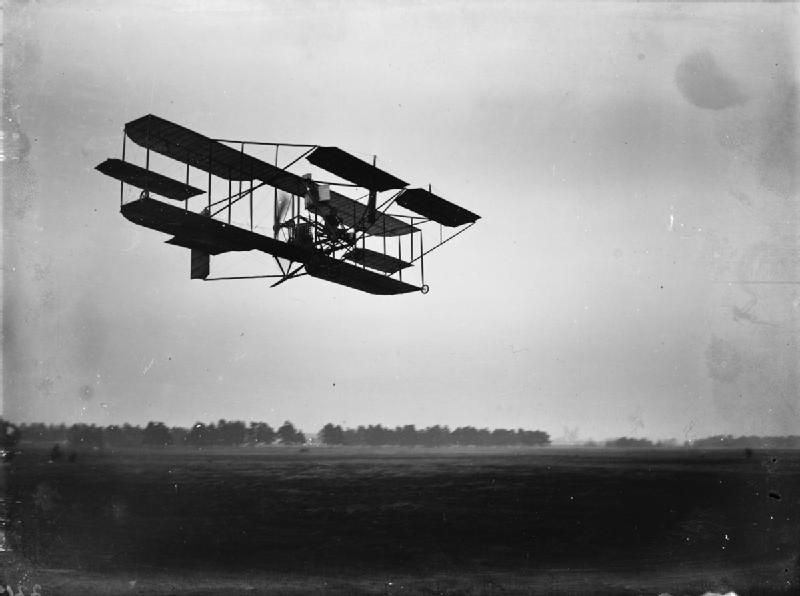

General information
- Type: Experimental aircraft
- Manufacturer: S. F. Cody
- Designer: S. F. Cody
- Number built: 1

History
- First flight: April 1910

The Cody Michelin Cup Biplane was an experimental aircraft designed and built in Britain during 1910 by Samuel Franklin Cody, a prominent showman and aviation pioneer. Cody had worked with the British Army on experiments with man-lifting kites and in October 1908 had successfully built and flown the British Army Aeroplane No 1, making the first officially verified powered flight in the United Kingdom. Cody broke the existing endurance record twice in the aircraft, the second flight, made on 31 December 1910, winning him the Michelin Cup for the longest-lasting flight made over a closed circuit in the United Kingdom before the end of the year.

== Background ==
In 1910 there were a number of prizes on offer, offering both prestige and in some cases large sums of money. Among them were the £4,000 Baron de Forest prize for the longest all-British flight to a destination in mainland Europe, the Michelin Cup and £500 endurance prize for the longest flight observed over a closed circuit and £10,000 offered by the Daily Mail newspaper for a flight between London and Manchester.

== Design ==
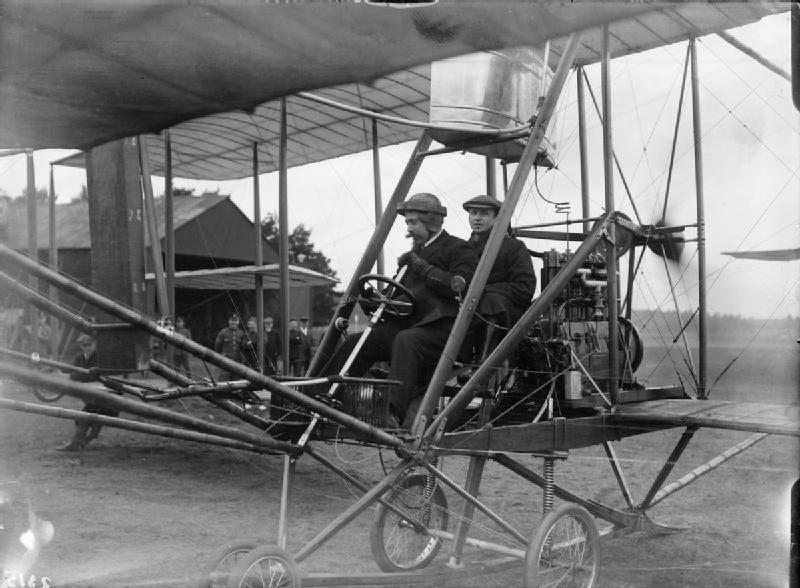

After his success with the Army Aeroplane Cody started work on a new design for 1910. This was a three-bay biplane of similar design. A large elevator, divided into two sections at the centre, was carried in front of the wing on three sets of booms, one at each end and the third at the centre. A rectangular rudder was carried on two booms extending aft, the lower attached to the apex of inverted V struts below the engine bearers, which also supported the long skid projecting back from below the lower wings's leading edge. Lateral control was by ailerons mounted on the outermost interplane struts of each wing. The elevators were operated by a pair of bamboo push-rods, leading to control horns mounted at the centre of each half of the elevator. It had a tricycle undercarriage, augmented by a long skid projecting back behind the wing trailing edge and small wheels mounted on the wingtips. The aircraft was initially powered by a 60 hp (45 kW) Green water-cooled engine mounted on the lower wing using a chain to drive a single two-bladed pusher propeller mounted on a shaft halfway between the wings.

A contemporary journal from a nearby Aldershot based regiment describes the Biplane as it was during testing and at the time of the accident. It said that the new plane had several improvements over the previous plane from 1909: smaller and lighter than the previous, with two independent 4-cylinder Green engines set behind the pilot's seat. It mentions one "huge wooden propeller" positioned to the rear of the engines and a single steering pillar which all the other control switches were attached to. The plane is described as beautifully finished with polished wood and nickel plating.

== Operational history ==
The aircraft was flying by June 1910. For a flight on 7 June, Cody was awarded his Aero Club certificate, the ninth issued, having made his qualifying flights at Laffan's Plain, Farnborough. After a crash, which kept Cody in bed for a few days in June, the Green powerplant was replaced by a 60 hp (45 kW) E.N.V. Type F engine. A fixed horizontal surface was added to the rudder and the ailerons were moved inwards and back, so that they were between the rear struts and the outer bay of each wing.

On 21 July, Cody stayed in the air for 2 hours 24 minutes, covering a distance of 94.5 miles (152 km) over a closed circuit at Laffan's Plain, setting a new British endurance record. This record was beaten by Thomas Sopwith in November, but on the last day of the year Cody managed to stay aloft for 4 hours 47 minutes at Laffans Plain, so winning the Michelin Cup and a prize of £500.

Cody continued flying the aircraft in 1911 while working on a new aircraft to compete in the Daily Mail Circuit of Britain Air Race, in January making a remarkable flight carrying three passengers, one of whom had to stand on the wing. In March 1911 the aircraft was displayed at the 1911 Aero Show at Olympia.

== Specifications ==
Data from Lewis

General characteristics

- Crew: 1
- Capacity: 1
- Length: 38 ft 6 in (11.73 m)
- Wingspan: 46 ft (14 m)
- Wing area: 540 sq ft (50 m^{2})
- Empty weight: 2,200 lb (998 kg)
- Gross weight: 2,950 lb (1,338 kg)
- Powerplant: 1 × Green D.4 4-cyl water-cooled in-line piston engine, 60 hp (45 kW)

Performance

- Maximum speed: 65 mph (105 km/h, 56 kn)

== See also ==
Related development

- British Army Aeroplane No 1
- Cody Circuit of Britain Biplane
