= Philip Jarrett =

English author and aviation historian

Philip M. Jarrett
- Born: England
- Occupations: Author, aviation historian, editor
- Years active: 1971–present
- Employer(s): Freelance (since 1990); Formerly: Flight International, Aeroplane Monthly, Aerospace
- Known for: Aviation history publications Honorary Companion of the Royal Aeronautical Society (2014)
- Notable work: Another Icarus; Ultimate Aircraft; The Helsinki School (as editor)
- Awards: Honorary Companion, Royal Aeronautical Society (2014)

Philip M. Jarrett is an English author and aviation historian. In 1971, he was the assistant editor of Aerospace, a periodical published by the Royal Aeronautical Society. From 1973 to 1980, he was the assistant editor of Aeroplane Monthly. From 1980 to 1989, he worked for Flight International, initially as the chief sub-editor, and then as production editor. Since 1990, he has been a freelance author, editor, and consultant.

In 2014, he was made an Honorary Companion of the Royal Aeronautical Society, in recognition of his work as an aviation historian.

== Publications ==
=== As author ===
- — (1987). Another Icarus : Percy Pilcher and the quest for flight. Washington, DC: Smithsonian Institution Press. ISBN 087474556X.
- — (1992). Flight souvenir guide. London: Science Museum. ISBN 0901805548.
- — (2000). Ultimate aircraft. London: Dorling Kindersley. ISBN 0751307106.
- — (2000). Percy Pilcher and the challenge of flight. Edinburgh, UK: National Museums of Scotland. ISBN 1901663566.
- — (2007). The colour encyclopedia of incredible aeroplanes. London: Dorling Kindersley. ISBN 9781405335980.
- — (2007). Trials, troubles and triplanes : Alliott Verdon Roe's fight to fly. Ringshall, Suffolk: Ad Hoc Publications. ISBN 9780946958658.
- — (2009). Fairey IIIF : interwar military workhorse. Ringshall, Suffolk: Ad Hoc Publications. ISBN 9780946958726.
- — (2011). Frank McClean : godfather to British naval aviation. Barnsley, South Yorkshore: Seaforth. ISBN 9781848321090.
- — (2015). The Royal Naval Air Service in the First World War : aircraft and events as recorded in official documents. Barnsley, South Yorkshire: Pen & Sword Aviation. ISBN 9781473828193.
- — (2015). Sopwith Dove : a sporting biplane with fighter forebears. Kent, UK: Air-Britain Publishing. ISBN 9780851304786.
- — (2021). Philip Jarrett's book of aeronautical nonsense. Horsham, West Sussex: The Aviation Historian.

=== As co-author ===
- Sturtivant, Ray; Page, Gordon; Halley, James J. & — (2020). Bristol Fighter : Frank Barnwell's ubiquitous multirole masterpiece. Tonbridge, Kent: Air-Britain. ISBN 9780851305363.

=== As editor ===
- —, ed. (1997). Aircraft of the Second World War : the development of the warplane 1939-45 (Putnam's History of Aircraft). London: Putnam Aeronautical Books. ISBN 9780851778754.
- —, ed. (1997). Biplane to monoplane: aircraft development 1919-39 (Putnam's History of Aircraft). London: Putnam Aeronautical Books. ISBN 0851778747.
- —, ed. (2000). Modern air transport : worldwide air transport from 1945 to the present (Putnam's History of Aircraft). London: Putnam Aeronautical Books. ISBN 9780851778778.
- —, ed. (2000). The modern war machine : military aviation since 1945 (Putnam's History of Aircraft). London: Putnam Aeronautical Books. ISBN 9780851778808.
- —, ed. (2002). Faster, further, higher : leading-edge aviation technology since 1945 (Putnam's History of Aircraft). London: Putnam Aeronautical Books. ISBN 9780851778761.
- —, ed. (2002). Pioneer aircraft : early aviation to 1914 (Putnam's History of Aircraft). London: Putnam Aeronautical Books. ISBN 9780851778693.
