= 1912 British Military Aeroplane Competition =

1912 Military Aeroplane Competition
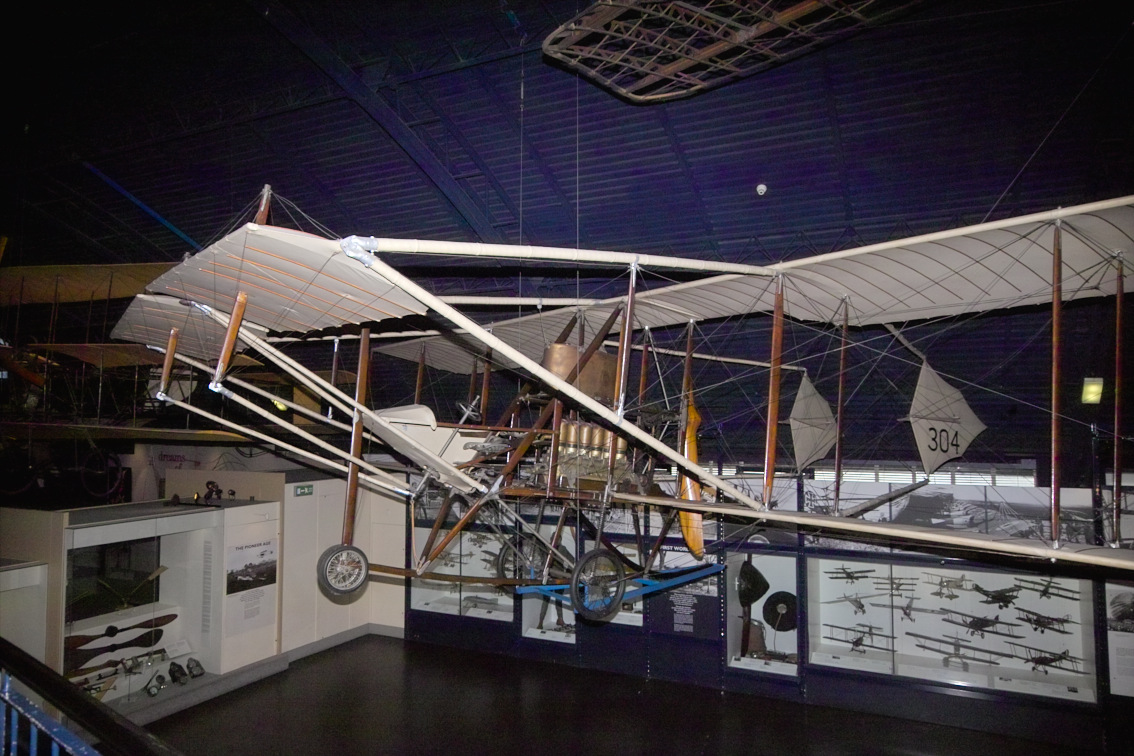
- The second Cody V in the Science Museum, London

In 1911 the British War Office announced their first Military Aeroplane Competition for aircraft to meet the requirements of the Air Battalion Royal Engineers. The formal requirements were published in December 1911. By the time the trials were held in August 1912, the Air Battalion had become the Military wing of the Royal Flying Corps (RFC). It was held at Larkhill on Salisbury Plain, and the competition was won by S. F. Cody with his Cody V biplane.

== "Specification for a Military Aeroplane" ==
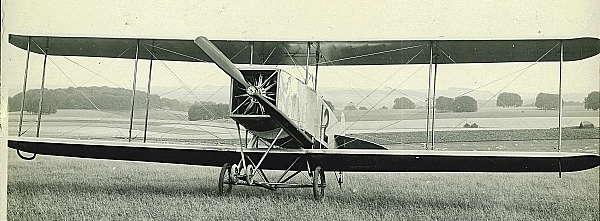
No. 12 a Bristol Gordon England biplane, pilot C. Howard Pixton

By 1911 it was clear that the development of aircraft had reached the point where they were of military significance. France, the world leader in aviation at the time, had over 200 aircraft in military service. In contrast, Britain's total military aircraft strength was nineteen aircraft, of which, in the words of Colonel J.E.B Seely, Under-Secretary of State for War, "one is broken beyond repair and one is quite out of date. Others are more or less under repair" adding "We are arriving at a point when we think we see our way to choose what is the best type, first for teaching people to fly, and secondly, to buy for the purposes of war should war unfortunately break out". The only practical step that had been taken by the War Office was the creation of an establishment for the scientific examination of the various problems involved in aircraft design. After some consultation with the Royal Aero Club and various aircraft manufacturers, they announced their "Specification for a Military Aeroplane" in late December, the details being published in Flight magazine on 23 December 1911.

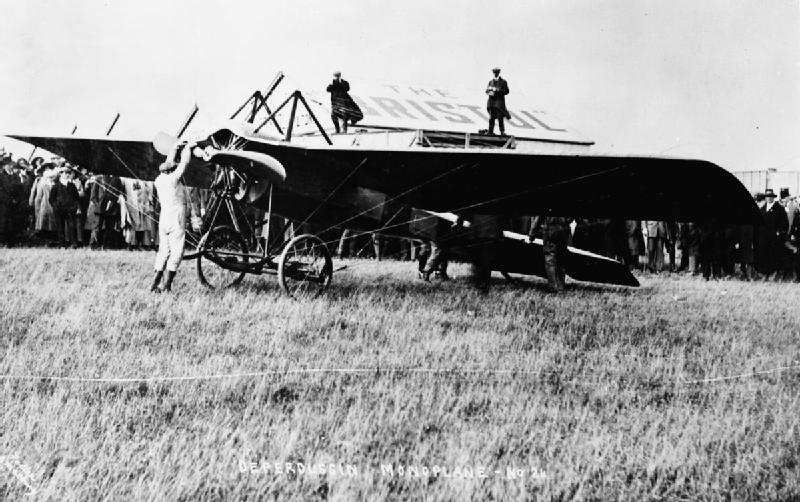
Deperdussin monoplane (entrant no.21) at the Trials, pilot Jules Védrines

The aircraft's performance had to meet the following requirements:

- Carry a live load of 350 lb (160 kg), in addition to its equipment and instruments and with fuel and oil for 4½ hours.
- Provide accommodation for a pilot and observer, with controls capable of use by either occupant.
- Fly when loaded for 3 hours, during which they should climb to 1000 ft (304 m) in five minutes or less and reach an altitude of 4,500 ft (1,400 m), maintaining that altitude for an hour.
- Attain an air speed of not less than 55 miles per hour.
- Take off from long grass or rough ground in 100 yards (91 m) or less in calm weather, and be capable of being landed without damage on cultivated land by a pilot of ordinary skill.

Additionally, the aircraft had to be transported to Larkhill in a crate of specified size and assembled there. Aircraft had to be capable of being dismantled and transported by road or rail, and the ease of rigging and de-rigging would be one of the factors taken into account by the judges.

Prizes were to be awarded for aircraft built in any country: first prize £4,000, second prize £2,000. Prizes for British subjects in an aircraft made in the United Kingdom (except the engine): first prize £1500, two second prizes of £1,000, and three third prizes of £500. Ten other aircraft that passed the flying test would be given £100.

The War Office issued an amended and slightly less demanding list of specifications in May 1912, and manufacturers were to submit their entries to the Secretary of the Judges Committee by 15 June. The aircraft had to be delivered to Larkhill on or before 15 July. No date was given for the actual flying trials.

These eventually started on 2 August 1912. Originally 32 different aircraft were entered for the trials but some failed to turn up. The competition was judged by a committee consisting of Brigadier D . Henderson, Captain Godfrey Paine and Mervyn O'Gorman, with Major F.H. Sykes acting as Secretary.

The trials were very different from modern military aircraft trials. Although the public were excluded from the aircraft hangars and flying field, otherwise free access was allowed. Aviation was then a subject of great popular interest, and many people came to watch.

== Aircraft ==
Serial number	Aircraft	Entry	Notes
1	Hanriot 1912 Monoplane	Hanriot (England) Limited	£100 for completing trial
2	Hanriot 1912 Monoplane	Hanriot (England) Limited	£100 for completing trial
3	Vickers Monoplane No. 6	Vickers Limited	Completed trial
4	Blériot XI-2	Louis Bleriot	Tandem seating, £100 for completing trial, purchased by the Royal Flying Corps after trial
5	Blériot XXI	Louis Bleriot	Side-by-side seating, £100 for completing trial
6	Avro Type G	A V Roe and Co	
7	Avro Type G	A V Roe and Co	£100 for completing trial
8	Breguet Biplane Biplane	Breguet Aeroplanes Limited	British-built, 110 hp Salmson engine. Engine problems stopped it from paying a major part in the trials.
9	Breguet Type U2	Breguet Aeroplanes Limited	French-built, 110 hp Salmson engine, crashed before trial
10	COW Biplane	Coventry Ordnance Works Limited	Did not complete trial
11	COW Biplane	Coventry Ordnance Works Limited	Did not enter due to engine trouble
12	Bristol GE.2	Bristol and Colonial Aeroplane Company	
13	Bristol GE.2	Bristol and Colonial Aeroplane Company	3rd Prize of £500 in the British-built category, purchased by the Royal Flying Corps
14	Bristol-Coanda Monoplane	Bristol and Colonial Aeroplane Company	3rd Prize of £500 in the British-built category, purchased by the Royal Flying Corps
15	Bristol-Coanda Monoplane	Bristol and Colonial Aeroplane Company	Purchased by the Royal Flying Corps after trial
16	Flanders B.2	L. Howard-Flanders Limited	Withdrawn and did not finish trial
17	Martin-Handayside Monoplane	Martin & Handayside	Had engine trouble during trial
18	Aerial Wheel Syndicate Monoplane	Aerial Wheel Syndicate Limited	Arrived at Larkhill but not assembled in time for start of flight trials
19	Mersey Monoplane	Mersey Aeroplane Company	Fatal crash during trial
20	Deperdussin Monoplane	British Deperdussin Aeroplane Company Limited	100 hp Anzani radial engine
21	Deperdussin Monoplane	British Deperdussin Aeroplane Company Limited	100 hp Gnome rotary engine 3rd Prize of £500 in the British-built category, purchased by the Royal Flying Corps after trial
22	Maurice Farman S.7	Aircraft Manufacturing Company Limited	£100 for completing trial
23	DFW Mars monoplane	Cecil E. Kny	Did not arrive
24	Lohner biplane	Jacob Lohner and Co	Did not arrive
25	Harper Monoplane	A M Harper	Did not arrive
26	Deperdussin Monoplane	Armand Deperdussin	100 hp Gnome rotary engine French-built, 2nd prize in any country category of £2,000, purchased by the Royal Flying Corps
27	Deperdussin Monoplane	Armand Deperdussin	French-built, did not arrive
28	Handley Page Type F monoplane	Handley Page Limited	Damaged during trial
29	Piggott biplane	Piggott Brothers and Co Limited	Did not complete trial
30	Cody IV monoplane	Mr S F Cody	Crashed before trial
31	Cody V biplane	Mr S F Cody	Winner of the trial with the 1st prize in any country category of £4,000 and 1st prize in the British-built category of £1,000, purchased by the Royal Flying Corps
32	Borel monoplane	Societe Anonyme des Aeroplanes, Borel	Not ready to compete

== Aftermath ==
The Cody biplane successfully passed all the tests and was declared winner of the competition, despite the fact that several other of the competitors (such as the Hanriot monoplanes) demonstrated better all-round performance. As a result, the Cody was purchased by the Flying Corps, with an order placed for a second example to be built by Cody.

Several more of the competitors were also purchased by the Royal Flying Corps. These were the Blériot XI-2, the two Bristol Coanda monoplanes and the two Gnome-powered Deperdussins. Most of these aircraft saw little use, with one of the Deperdussins crashing fatally on 6 September 1912, followed by one of the Bristol-Coanda monoplanes on 10 September (with the Bristol crash being caused by inadvertent operation in flight of a quick-release catch which had been fitted to allow easy disassembly for the Trials). These crashes resulted in a ban being imposed on monoplane use by the RFC, which had a long-term effect on the course of British aircraft design. The Cody Trials aircraft crashed fatally due to a structural failure in April 1913, and the second Cody biplane was withdrawn from use.

The War Office had already placed orders for A. V. Roe's Type 500 two seat biplane, the Gnome-engined immediate predecessor of the Type G. They had also placed orders for examples of the B.E.1 built by the Royal Aircraft Factory and designed by Geoffrey de Havilland. The prototypes of this design had put in a number of appearances at the trials and had clearly demonstrated its all-round superiority over the other aircraft; they were barred from competition because the Director of the Royal Aircraft Factory, Mervyn O'Gorman, was on the panel of judges.

== Bibliography ==
- Bruce, J. M. The Aeroplanes of the Royal Flying Corps (Military Wing). London: Putnam, 1982. ISBN 0-370-30084-X.
- Driver, Hugh The Birth of Military Aviation: Britain 1902-1914. Woodbridge: The Boydell Press for the Royal Historical Society, 1997. ISBN 0-86193-234-X
- Lewis, P British Aircraft 1806-1914. London: Putnam, 1967
- Robertson, Bruce (1987). British Military Aircraft Serials 1878-1987. Letchworth, England: Midland Counties Publications. ISBN 0-904597-61-X.
