= Farnborough Air Sciences Trust =

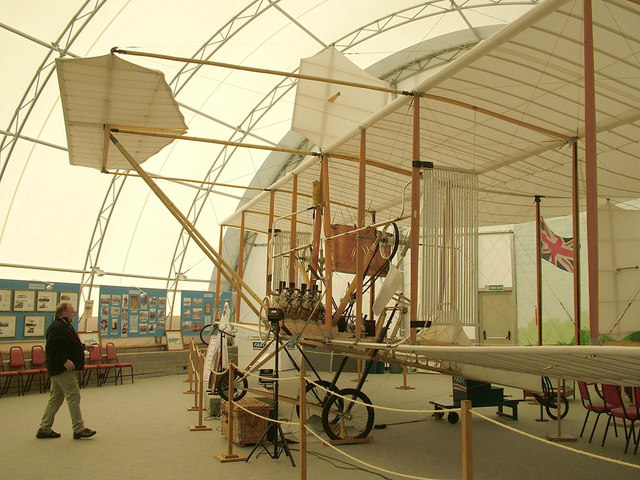
- Established: 1994
- Location: Farnborough, Hampshire, England
- Coordinates: 51.2823°N 0.7530°W
- Type: Aviation museum
- Website: Official FAST website

The Farnborough Air Sciences Trust (FAST) museum holds a collection of aircraft (actual and model), satellites, simulators, wind tunnel and Royal Aircraft Establishment-related material. It is based in Farnborough, Hampshire immediately adjacent to Farnborough Airfield on the A325 Farnborough Road.

Part of the collection is housed in Trenchard House (Building G1 of the former Royal Aircraft Establishment), which includes a library, an archive, a cafe and a shop. There are aircraft on display, some of which have had significant design and/or development contribution from Farnborough. A collection of wind tunnel models is held in storage, along with documentation and historical records of engineering and technical development. There is also a large collection of plans and drawings relating to the Farnborough and Pyestock sites.

The museum is open on Saturdays and Sundays from 10:00 to 16:00. It is managed by the trustees of FAST while day-to-day running is carried out by volunteers of the FAST Association.

The museum has received praise from the press. In 2009, it featured in both The Times' 'List of the Top 10 Geeky Holiday Spots on the Planet' and The Sun's Kid's Go Free Top 10 Educational Visitor Attractions.

== Trenchard House ==
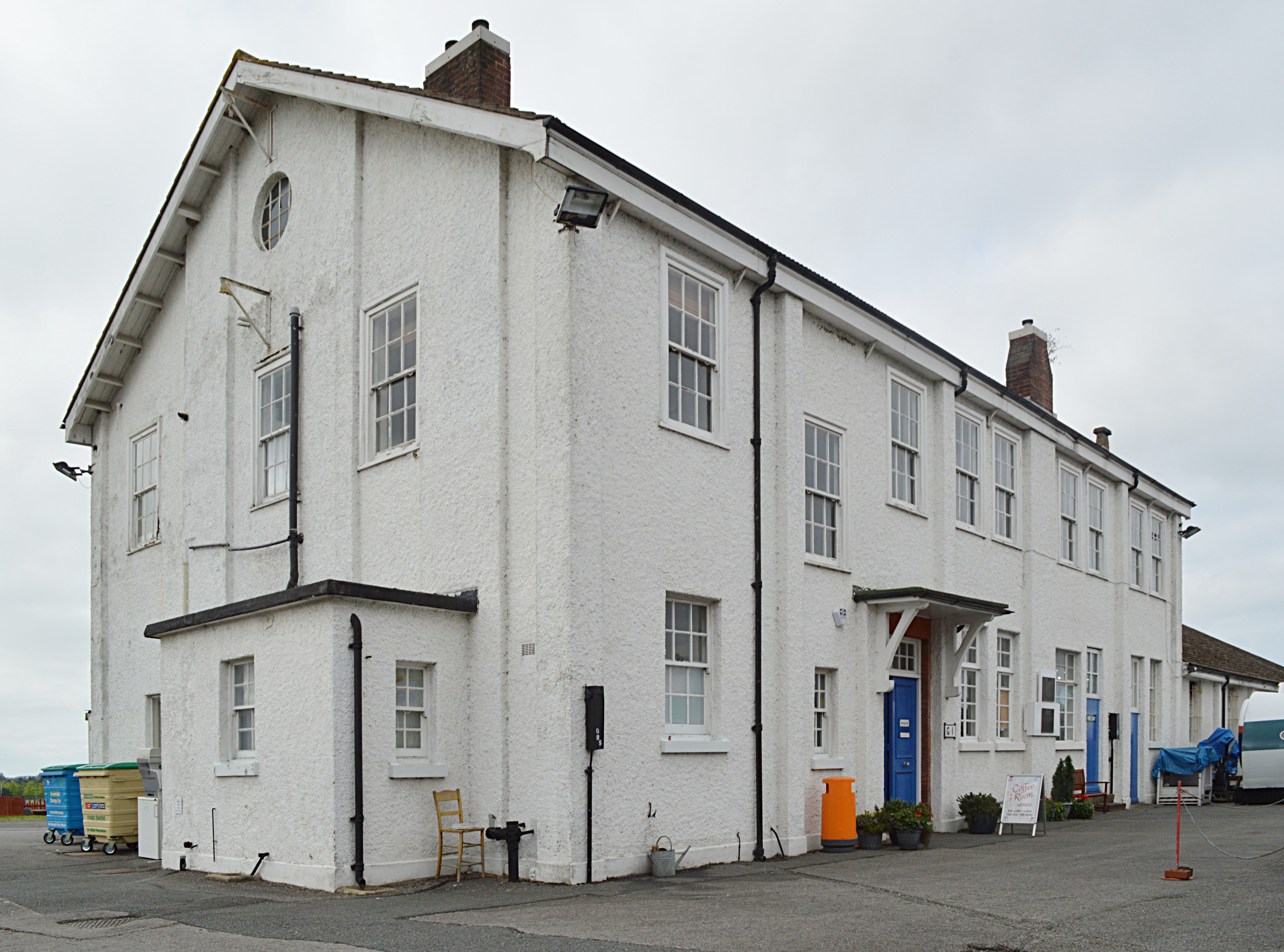
Trenchard House (Building G1)

Trenchard House was built on the Farnborough site in 1907 as the headquarters of No 1 (Airship) Company of the Air Battalion of the Royal Engineers (later No 1 Squadron of the Royal Flying Corps). Known then as G1 Building, it is the oldest building on the site.

In 1914 it became the temporary headquarters of Lord Trenchard when he was appointed Officer Commanding the Military Wing of the Royal Flying Corps. The RFC's first operational squadrons were based in the hangars immediately in front of the building.

The Grade II* listed building has since become the administrative headquarters of FAST.

== See also ==
- List of aerospace museums
