= Cody V biplane =

Cody V
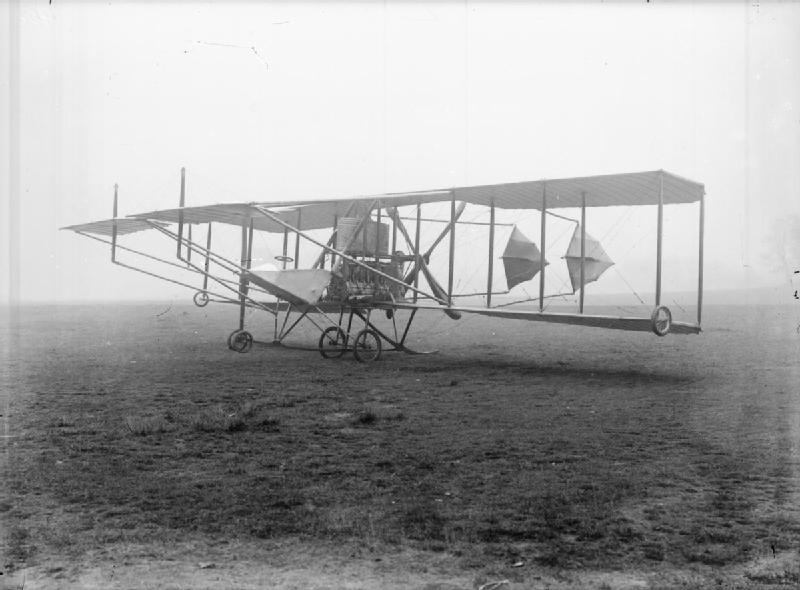

General information
- Type: Experimental biplane
- National origin: United Kingdom
- Designer: Samuel Franklin Cody
- Primary user: Royal Flying Corps
- Number built: 2

History
- Introduction date: 1912
- First flight: July 1912
- Retired: 1913

The Cody V was a single-engined biplane built by the British-based American aviation pioneer Samuel Franklin Cody in 1912. It was built from the remains of two of Cody's earlier aircraft, and won the 1912 British Military Aeroplane Competition, with two aircraft being purchased for the Royal Flying Corps. The design was abandoned after the mid-air disintegration of one of the aircraft in April 1913.

== Development and design ==
In December 1911, the British War Office announced a competition for a military aeroplane capable of carrying a pilot and observer for the recently established Royal Flying Corps. First prize was £4,000, with the War Office having the option to purchase any of the prizewinning machines.

The American showman and aviation pioneer Samuel Cody, who had developed a system of man-carrying kites from 1901, had built his first aircraft, the British Army Aeroplane No 1, at the Army Balloon Factory at Farnborough in 1908. Its first flight on 16 October 1908 was recognised as the first powered controlled flight in the United Kingdom. He intended to enter two aircraft into the Military Trials, which were planned to start on 1 August 1912: a monoplane powered by a 120-hp (89 kW) Austro-Daimler engine which had been salvaged from an Etrich Taube which had crashed during the 1911 Daily Mail Circuit of Britain Air Race, and a biplane powered by a 60-hp Green engine, with which Cody had finished fourth in the 1911 Circuit of Britain.

However, the biplane was wrecked hitting a tree when landing on 3 July, and on 8 July Cody crashed the monoplane, badly damaging it and killing a cow. Still keen to enter the competition, Cody used the remains of the two damaged aircraft to build a new biplane, later to be known as the Cody V, using the powerful Austro-Daimler engine. This was a pusher canard biplane, with seats for the pilot and three other people in an open cockpit. Lateral control was by wing warping, and two vertical tails were carried on bamboo booms behind the engine.

== Operational history ==
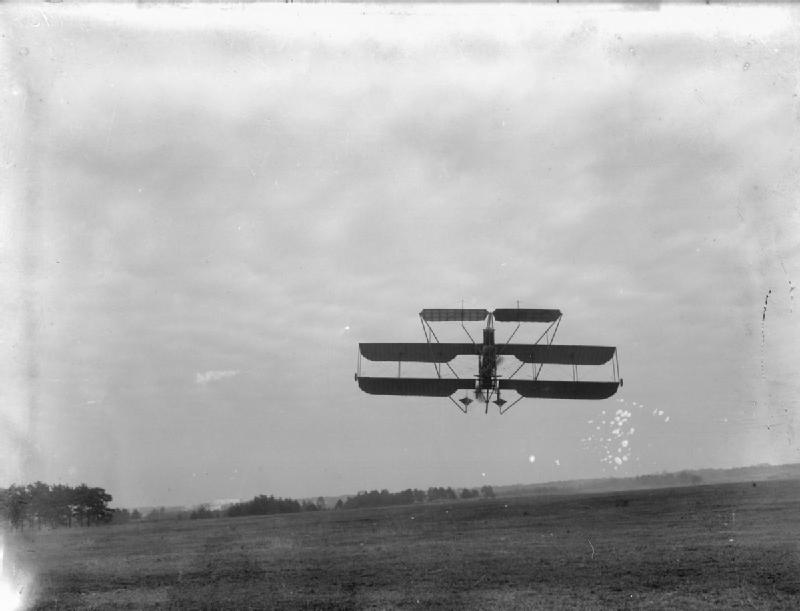
Cody V in flight

Cody took the new aircraft for its maiden flight on 23 July 1912, flying it to Salisbury on 27 July to take its place in the trials. While Cody's biplane was, even in 1912, outdated, it was declared the winner: Cody was awarded the £4,000 first prize and a further £1,000 for the best British-built aircraft. (Although the vastly superior B.E.2 took part in the trials, as a product of the Royal Aircraft Factory it was ineligible for the prizes.)

The War Office purchased the prototype Cody V, together with a second aircraft to be built to the same design. In October, Cody re-engined the biplane with a British-built 100-hp (75 kW) Green engine in order to enter the British Empire Michelin Cup competitions, winning the £600 prize for the fastest time over a 186-mile (299 km) circuit.

After re-fitting the Austro-Daimler engine, the prototype was delivered to the Royal Flying Corps on 30 November 1912, being issued to No. 4 Squadron in December that year. The second Cody V flew in January 1913, and was delivered in February. On 28 April 1913, the first prototype broke up in mid-air and the aircraft crashed, killing the pilot. The resulting investigation discovered that the aircraft's structure, which incorporated many parts from the 1911 Circuit of Britain aircraft, had deteriorated badly and was in "precarious" condition by the time of the crash. The second aircraft, which was awaiting repair of damage that had been received in an accident in March, was never flown again, and in November that year it was given to the Science Museum, London, where it is displayed today.

== Specifications ==
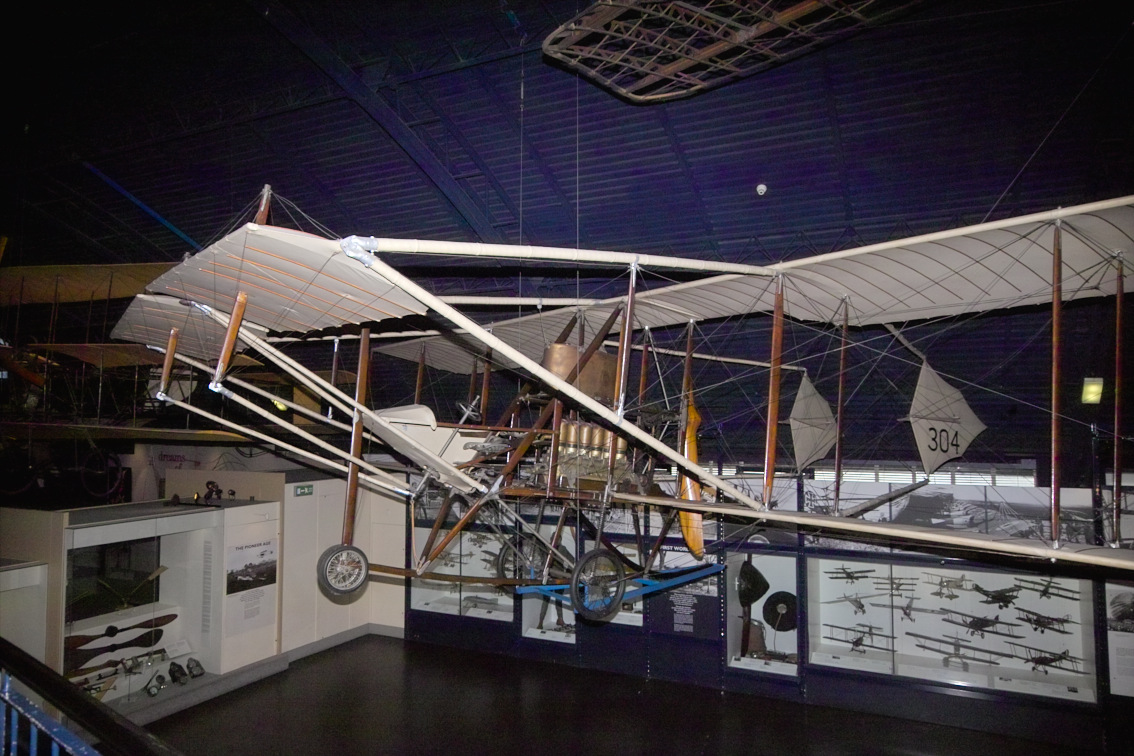
The second Cody V biplane on display at the Science Museum, London

Data from The Aeroplanes of the Royal Flying Corps (Military Wing)

General characteristics

- Crew: 1
- Capacity: 3 passengers
- Length: 37 ft 9 in (11.51 m)
- Wingspan: 43 ft 0 in (13.11 m)
- Wing area: 430 sq ft (40 m^{2})
- Empty weight: 1,900 lb (862 kg)
- Gross weight: 5,512 lb (2,500 kg)
- Powerplant: 1 × Austro-Daimler water-cooled six-cylinder inline engine, 120 hp (89 kW)

Performance

- Maximum speed: 72.4 mph (116.5 km/h, 62.9 kn)
- Stall speed: 48.5 mph (78.1 km/h, 42.1 kn)
- Range: 336 mi (541 km, 292 nmi)
- Rate of climb: 288 ft/min (1.46 m/s)
- Time to altitude: 1,200 ft (370 m) in 3 minutes 30 s
