= Green Engine Co =

British engine company

The Green Engine Co was a British engine company founded by Gustavus Green in Bexhill to sell engines of his design. He flourished especially as a designer of aeroplane engines during the first two decades of the 20th century. The engines were actually manufactured by the Aster Engineering Company.

== History ==
The firm produced a range of water-cooled, mostly inline engines up to about 1915. Green engines powered many pioneering British aircraft, including those of A. V. Roe, Samuel Cody, and Short Brothers. They had several advanced features in common; cast steel single-piece cylinders and cylinder heads, two valves per cylinder driven by an overhead camshaft, white metal crankshaft bearings and copper and rubber-sealed water jackets. Manufacture was at the Aster Engineering Company of Wembley.

When the Great War broke out, the company was known for its motorcycle engines and particularly associated with a "pannier honeycomb" radiator design. It was already involved in aero-engine design. In 1909, the C.4 had been the only motor to complete the tests for the Patrick Alexander Competition but was not awarded the £1,000 prize, because the rules called for a 35 hp (26 kW) engine while the C.4 only averaged 31.5 hp (23.5 kW). The competition was re-run the following year for more powerful engines: this time, Green gained the prize with the D.4. Up to 1912 Green was the only source of all-British aircraft engines capable of producing 60 hp (45 kW) and so the only choice when prizes were offered for all-British aircraft. The best known case is John Moore-Brabazon's winning the £1,000 Daily Mail prize for a circular 1 mi (0.87 nmi; 1.6 km) flight by a British pilot in an all-British aeroplane in his D.4-powered Short Biplane No. 2 in 1910.

In 1914, the company was awarded a £5,000 prize by the Army Council in a Naval and Military Aeroplane Engine Competition for their 100 hp (75 kW) water-cooled six-cylinder "Engine No. 1", which was judged to possess the highest number of attributes desirable in an aeroplane engine. It was designed to deliver maximum power at low speed and weighed 442 lb (200 kg).

Green continued to design motorcycle engines too, using cylinders similar to, though smaller than, those on their prize-winning aero-engine, having similar rubber-sealed copper jackets and removable overhead valve mechanisms designed to protect the cylinders from damage by broken valves, and forced lubrication throughout. In 1914, Motor Cycle magazine reported on a Zenith motorcycle supplied with the 'new' 964 cc (58.8 cu in) (8 hp (6 kW)) V-twin, of 85 mm (3.3 in) bore and stroke. One interesting detail seen on many modern motorcycles was 'the fitting of a glass window in the crank case to show the level of the oil'.

== Aircraft engines ==
Data from Gunston 1986, p. 72 and Lumsden 1994, pp. 154–6

- V-8, 100 hp (1908–1909)
- Green C.4 4-cylinder inline, 105 mm bore × 120mm stroke, 30–35 hp (1908–1910)
- Green D.4 4-cylinder inline, 140 mm bore × 146 mm stroke, 50–60 hp (1909–1910)
- 6-cylinder inline, 140 mm bore × 146 mm stroke, 82 hp (1912–1916)
- Green E.6 6-cylinder inline, 140 mm bore × 152 mm stroke, 90–100 hp (1912–1916)
- 6-cylinder inline, E.6 development, 140 mm bore × 152 mm stroke, 120 hp
- V-12, 275 hp (1914–1915)

== Applications (grouped by engine power) ==
Source:Goodall & Tagg 2001

=== Aeroplanes ===
35 hp inline C.4

- ASL Valkyrie A
- Avro Type D
- Avro Baby
- Blackburn First Monoplane
- Handley Page Type D
- Hornstein biplane
- Macfie Empress
- Martin-Handasyde monoplane No.3
- Neale VII biplane
- Roe II Triplane
- Roe III Triplane
- Roe IV Triplane
- Short S.27 (Airframe nos. S.27 and S.28)
- Sopwith Wright biplane
- Wells Reo

60 hp inline D.4

- ASL monoplane No.2
- ASL Valkyrie C
- Avro Type G
- Blackburn Type E
- Cody Michelin Cup biplane
- Cody Circuit of Britain biplane
- Dunne D.5
- Dunne D.7
- Dunne D.8
- Flanders F.2
- Flanders F.3
- George & Jobling biplane
- Grahame-White XV

8Handley Page Type B

- Harper monoplane
- Howard Wright biplane
- Humphreys monoplane
- Megone biplane
- Northern Aircraft PB.1
- Poynter monoplane
- Short Biplane No. 2
- Sonoda Tractor Biplane

100 hp inline E.4

- Bass-Paterson flying boat
- Cody V
- Eastbourne Aviation Circuit biplane
- Gnosspelius hydro-biplane
- Graham-White Charabancs Type 10
- Royal Aircraft Factory F.E.2a
- Short S.68 Seaplane
- Sopwith Bat Boat type 1
- Sopwith Three-seater
- Sopwith 1913 Circuit of Britain Seaplane
- Sopwith Type TT

=== Airships ===
35 hp inline C.4
Army Balloon Factory Beta I

80 hp V-8
Army Balloon Factory Gamma I (the first all-British airship)

=== Boats ===
The Defender II a 1909 racing boat owned by Fred May was powered by a 60 hp Green aeroplane engine. In World War I, the well made, reliable but heavy (450 lbs or 204 kg) 82 hp Green inline engine was produced for fast boats rather than aircraft.
