= Green D.4 =

Engine

D.4
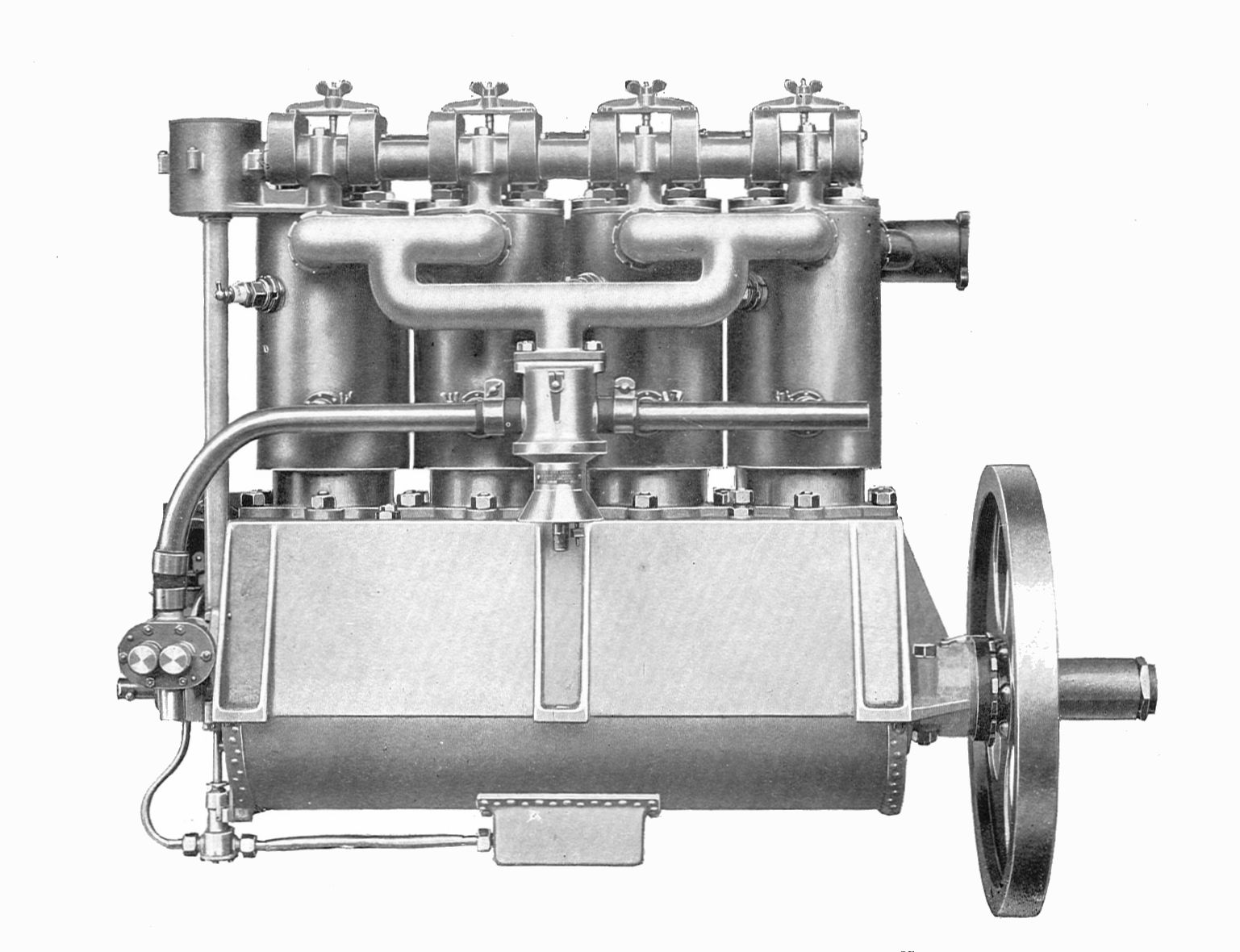
- Type: 4-cylinder water-cooled inline upright piston engine
- National origin: United Kingdom
- Manufacturer: Green Engine Co. Ltd, London
- Designer: Gustavus Green
- First run: 1909
- Developed from: Green C.4

The Green D.4 was a four-cylinder watercooled inline piston engine produced by the Green Engine Co in the UK in 1909. It produced about 60 hp (45 kW) and played an important role in the development of British aviation before World War I.

== Design ==
The Green D.4 was a natural development of the Green C.4, a 30-35 hp engine used by some early aviators in the UK, such as Roe and the Short Brothers. It was an inline, water-cooled 4-cylinder piston engine with characteristic Green features: cast-steel single-piece cylinders and cylinder heads, two valves per cylinder driven by an overhead camshaft, white metal crankshaft bearings and copper water jackets, rubber-sealed to allow for differential expansion.

Increases in bore and stroke gave the D.4 more than twice the swept volume of the C.4 and roughly doubled its power. The cast-steel cylinders, individually machined inside and out, were mounted separately onto a flat-sided aluminium crankcase. They were fastened down by long bolts between them, which reached into the crankcase to support the four inner crankshaft bearings. The main bearings were in the crankcase ends, and the ball race was designed to allow either pusher or tractor operation. A flywheel was fitted to the output shaft. Thin cylindrical copper water jackets surrounded the cylinders almost to their base, where a rubber ring, located by a circumferential groove in the cylinder, provided a sliding water seal that allowed for the differential thermal contraction of copper and steel. Cooling water was fed to these jackets by an engine-driven pump via a horizontal tube on the low right side of the engine, assuming a tractor orientation, and fed to the radiator by another tube on the top left.

A single jet Zenith carburettor with a remote float chamber fed a double branched inlet manifold on the right; the plugs, also set in the cylinder walls, were on the same side, below and angled to the inlets. The exhaust ports were on the left side, angled forwards. A crankshaft driven Bosch magneto at the rear provided the plugs' high voltage supply. The overhead camshaft was also driven from the crankshaft via worm gears and a vertical shaft at the rear of the engine. The camshaft operated the valves by rockers with rollers on their camshaft ends and adjusting screws at the other.

Lubricating oil was mechanically pumped through cast-in channels in the crankcase to all the crankshaft bearings. The camshaft was contained in an oil tight sleeve.

The D.4 was usually described as a 50-60 hp engine, sometimes as 60 hp, 65 hp or 60-70 hp. The type designation D.4 was rarely used at the time.

== Operational history ==
Green's engines were noted for their reliability, and Green reinforced that reputation with entries into Government competitions; in 1910 the D.4 won the £1.000 prize donated to the winner by Patrick Alexander. There was a maximum power test, the D.4 achieving 67.8 hp at 1,210 rpm, but the emphasis was on endurance: the engine had to produce two non-stop 12 hr runs and average more than 58.5 hp. In the event, the D.4 averaged 61.6 hp with few signs of wear on inspection afterwards.

Up to 1912 the Green D.4 was the only all-British aircraft engine capable of producing 60 hp, so when prizes were offered for flights or races for all-British aircraft, the Green was the only choice. The best known example is that of Moore-Brabazon in his Short Biplane No. 2, winning the £1,000 Daily Mail prize in 1910 for a circular 1 mile flight by a British pilot in an all-British aeroplane.

The British Empire Michelin Trophies (no.1 for speed and no.2 for distance) between 1910 and 1913 were also all-British aircraft competitions. Six of the seven winners were powered by Green engines, showing their dominance and reliability. The winners of all four of the 1910-11 contests, three of Cody's aircraft plus Moore Brabazon's Short S.2, were D.4 powered.

Cody's D.4 also powered his entry to fourth place in the 1911 Daily Mail Circuit of Britain competition, a distance of 1,010 miles. That engine, flown over 7,000 miles, was exhibited at the 1913 Olympia Aero Show. Despite its pre-war success, neither the Green D.4 nor other Green models played a part in the war, in which the lighter, air-cooled French engines of Le Rhône, Clerget and Gnome were extensively used.

== Variants ==
- A long stroke (152 mm) development gave 65 hp (48 kW) at 1250 rpm, but seems not to have flown.

== Applications ==
Sources:Goodall & Tagg 2001 & Lumsden 1994, p. 155

- ASL monoplane No.2
- ASL Valkyrie C
- Avro Type G
- Blackburn Type E
- Cody No.IIA
- Cody No.IIB
- Cody No.IIC
- Cody No.III
- Dunne D.5
- Dunne D.7
- Dunne D.8
- Edwards Rhomboidal biplane (damaged in taxi trials, not flown)
- Flanders F.2
- Flanders F.3
- George & Jobling biplane
- Grahame-White XV
- Handley Page Type B
- Harper monoplane (possibly not completed)
- Howard Wright 1910 Biplane
- Humphreys monoplane No.1
- Humphreys monoplane No.2
- Humphreys monoplane No.3
- Megone biplane
- Northern Aircraft PB.1
- Poynter monoplane (probably not flown)
- Short Biplane No.2
- Sonoda Tractor Biplane

== Specifications ==
Data from Gunston 1989, p. 74

=== General characteristics ===
- Type: 4-cylinder watercooled inline upright poppet valve piston engine
- Bore: 5.51 in (140 mm)
- Stroke: 5.75 in (146 mm)
- Displacement: 549 cu in (9.0 litres)
- Dry weight: 259 lb (117 kg) bare; 302 lb (137 kg) with accessories

=== Components ===
- Valvetrain: two poppet valves per cylinder driven by overhead camshaft via rockers
- Fuel system: 1× single jet Zenith carburettor with separate float chamber
- Fuel type: petrol, 40-50 octane
- Oil system: fully forced, with cast-in channels to bearings and via hollow crankshaft to end bearings
- Cooling system: water, with rubber sealed spun copper jackets around each cylinder, engine pumped
- Reduction gear: none; direct right hand tractor drive
- Ignition: Single Bosch magneto

=== Performance ===
- Power output: 50 hp (37 kW) at 1,050 rpm, 70 hp (52 kW) at 1,200 rpm for short periods
- Fuel consumption: 0.590 lb/hp/hr (0.359 kg/kW/hr) at 62 hp
- Oil consumption: 0.175 lb/hp/hr (0.107 kg/kW/hr) at 62 hp

== See also ==
Related lists

- List of aircraft engines
