= Vickers E.F.B.7 =

British fighter aircraft

E.F.B.7
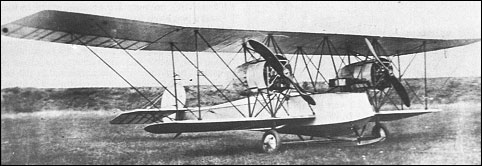

General information
- Type: Fighter aircraft
- National origin: United Kingdom
- Manufacturer: Vickers Limited
- Designer: Howard Flanders
- Status: Prototype
- Number built: 1

History
- First flight: August 1915
- Developed from: Flanders B.2

The Vickers E.F.B.7 was a prototype British fighter aircraft of the First World War. A twin-engined biplane, the E.F.B.7 was unsuccessful, only one being built.

== Development and design ==
In August 1914, following the outbreak of the First World War, the British pioneer aircraft designer Howard Flanders was hired by Vickers Limited as an aircraft designer, with his first job to design a fighting aircraft to carry a Vickers 1 pounder (37 mm) cannon. This was not the well-known pom-pom, but a smaller and lighter long recoil cannon firing less powerful ammunition. Flanders produced a twin-engined development of his earlier Flanders B.2 single-engined biplane, the E.F.B.7 (Experimental Fighting Biplane No.7).

The E.F.B.7 was a two-bay biplane with a steel-tube structure with plywood and fabric covering. It had un-staggered wings, with the upper wings of much greater (i.e. 22 ft [6.7 m]) span than the lower ones. It was powered by two tractor Gnome Monosoupape rotary engines mounted between the wings. The gunner sat in a large cockpit in the nose of the aircraft, with a rotating mount for the cannon and an armoured floor claimed to be bulletproof, while the pilot sat in a cockpit behind the wings, so that the pilot and gunner could not communicate.

The E.F.B.7 first flew in August 1915, being passed to the Central Flying School for testing. Sometime early in its career, it was fitted with large cowlings to catch oil from the engines. An order for a further twelve aircraft was placed on 20 August 1915, which were to have a modified fuselage, allowing the pilot to sit closer to the gunner and owing to a shortage of Monosoupapes, powered by two 80 hp (60 kW) Renault 80 hp air-cooled V8 engines. The first prototype was modified to this form, becoming the E.F.B.7A. Performance with these less powerful engines was much poorer and the production orders were cancelled on 16 February 1916 before any more were completed.

== Specifications (E.F.B.7) ==
Data from Vickers Aircraft since 1908

General characteristics

- Crew: Two
- Length: 36 ft 0 in (10.97 m)
- Upper wingspan: 59 ft 9 in (18.21 m)
- Lower wingspan: 37 ft 6 in (11.43 m)
- Wing area: 640 sq ft (59 m^{2})
- Empty weight: 2,136 lb (969 kg)
- Gross weight: 7,046 lb (3,196 kg)
- Powerplant: 2 × Gnome Monosoupape rotary engine, 100 hp (75 kW) each

Performance

- Maximum speed: 75 mph (121 km/h, 65 kn) at 5,000 ft (1,500 m)
- Endurance: 2.5 hr
- Service ceiling: 9,000 ft (2,700 m)
- Time to altitude: 18 min to 9,000 ft (2,700 m)

Armament

- Guns: 1× Vickers 1-lbr gun

== See also ==
Related development

- Flanders B.2

Aircraft of comparable role, configuration, and era

- Vickers E.F.B.8
- Royal Aircraft Factory F.E.4
