= Green E.6 =

E.6
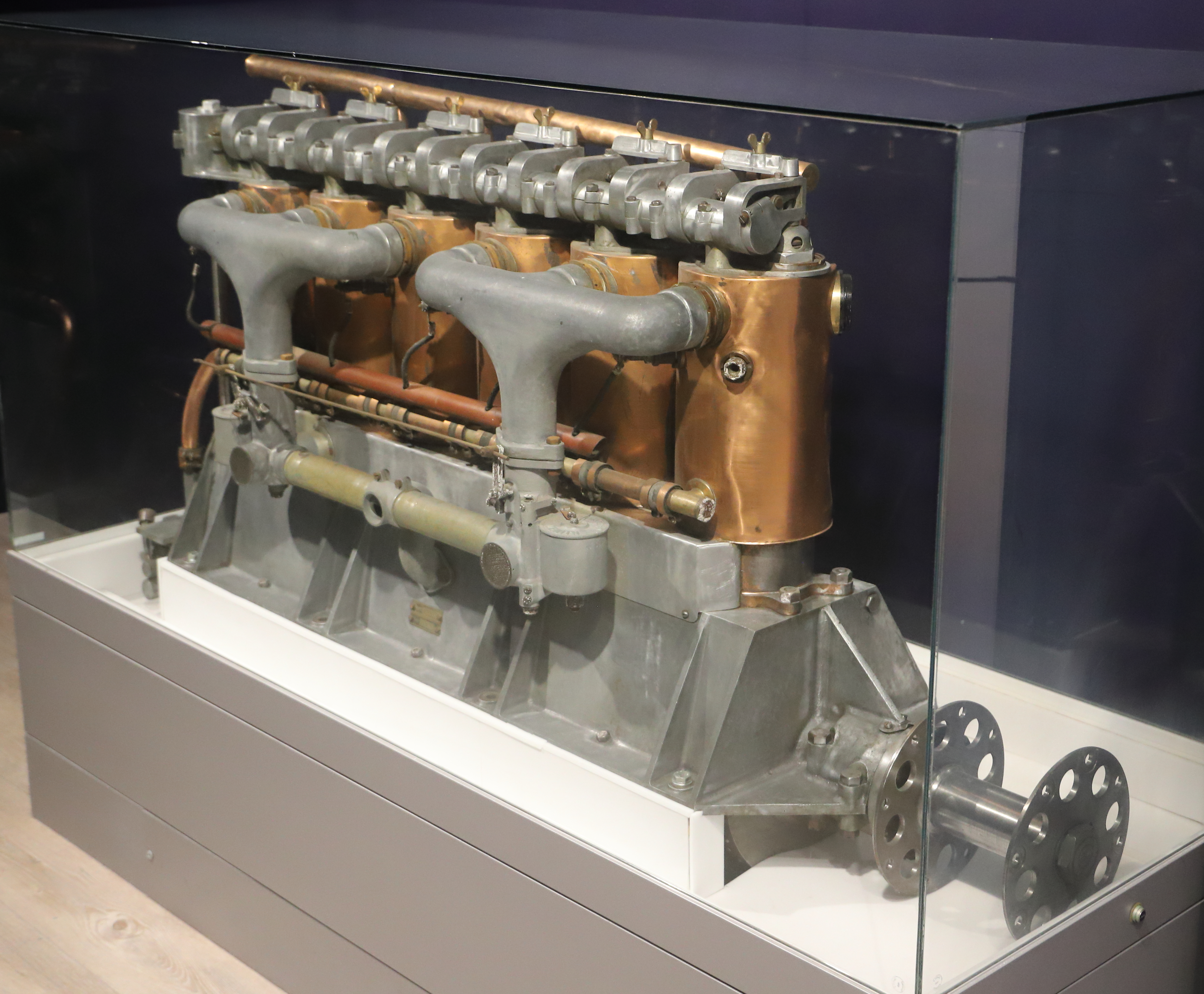
- Preserved Green E.6 on display at the Fleet Air Arm Museum
- Type: Piston aero engine
- Manufacturer: Green Engine Co Ltd
- First run: December 1911
- Number built: 42

The Green E.6 was a British six-cylinder, water-cooled aero engine that first ran in 1911, it was designed by Gustavus Green and built by the Green Engine Co and Mirlees, Bickerton & Day of Stockport between August 1914 and December 1918.

== Applications ==
- Avro 504K
- Avro 523A
- Bass-Paterson flying boat
- Cody Type V
- Eastbourne Aviation Circuit biplane
- Gnosspelius Hydro Tractor Biplane
- Grahame-White Type X Charabanc
- Royal Aircraft Factory F.E.2a
- Short S.68 Seaplane
- Sopwith Bat Boat
- Sopwith Three-seater
- Sopwith 1913 Circuit of Britain floatplane
- Sopwith Type TT

== Engines on display ==
A preserved Green E.6 engine is on public display at the Fleet Air Arm Museum, RNAS Yeovilton.

== Specifications (E.6) ==
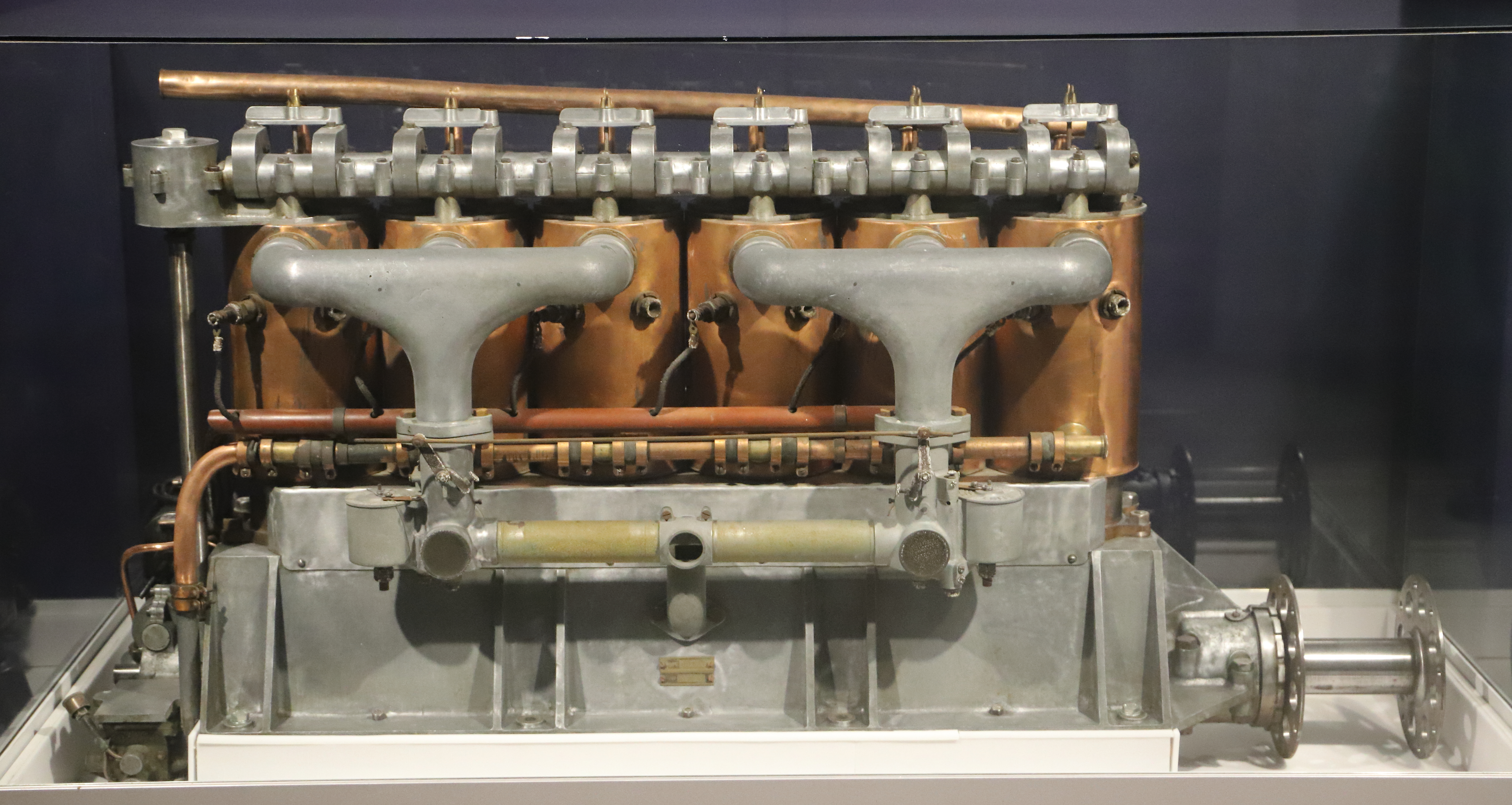
Green E.6 aircraft engine on display at the Fleet Air Arm Museum, RNAS Yeovilton

Data from Lumsden

=== General characteristics ===
- Type: 6-cylinder, inline, upright piston engine
- Bore: 5.51 in (140 mm)
- Stroke: 5.98 in (152 mm)
- Displacement: 855.54 cu in (14.03 L)
- Dry weight: 440 lb (200 kg)

=== Components ===
- Valvetrain: Gear driven overhead camshaft, two valves per cylinder
- Fuel type: 40-50 octane petrol
- Cooling system: Water-cooled
- Reduction gear: Direct drive, right-hand tractor

=== Performance ===
- Power output: 120 hp (89.5 kW) at 1,300 rpm (maximum power)
- Specific power: 0.14 hp/cu in (6.4 kW/L)
- Power-to-weight ratio: 0.27 hp/lb (0.45 kW/kg)

== See also ==
- Green C.4

Comparable engines

- Austro-Daimler 6
- Beardmore 120 hp

Related lists

- List of aircraft engines
