= Howard Wright =

Howard Wright may refer to:

- Howard Wright (basketball) (born 1967), American basketball player
- Howie Wright (born 1947), American basketball player
- Howard E. Wright, politician from California
- Howard Emery Wright (1908–1988), African-American social psychologist and educator
- Howard T. Wright, aircraft designer and manufacturer of e.g. Howard Wright 1909 Biplane

== See also ==
- Howard Wright biplane (disambiguation)
