= 1912 Brooklands Flanders Monoplane crash =

First properly investigated aviation accident

Coordinates: 51.3489°N 0.4725°W

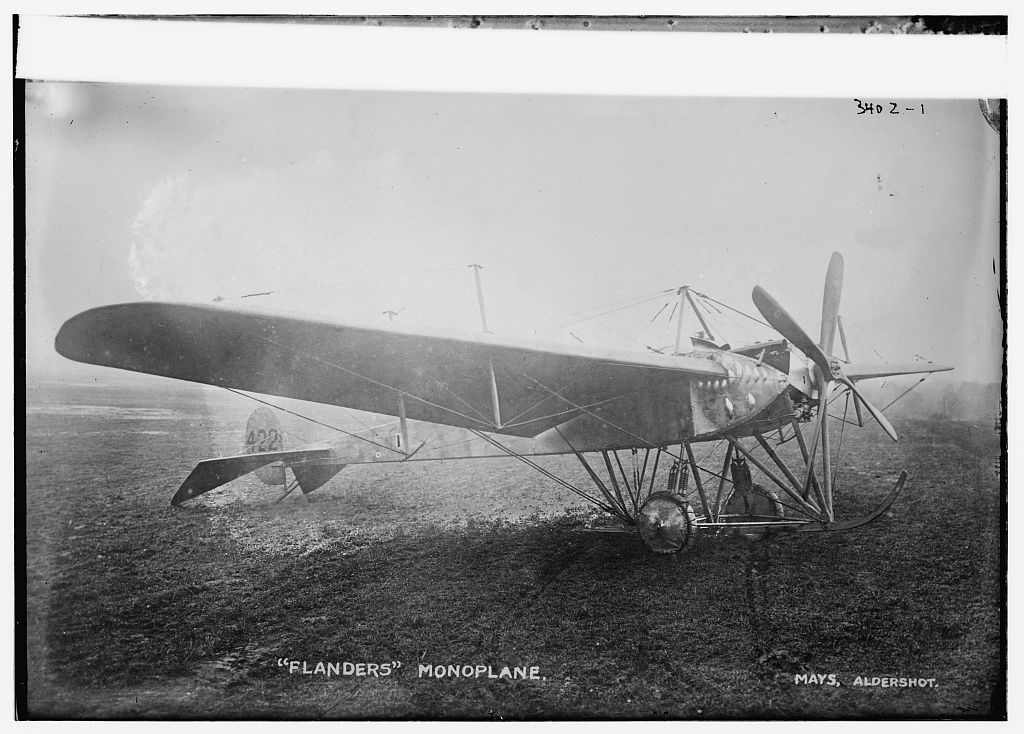
- The Flanders F.4 Monoplane was developed from the Flanders F.3

Accident
- Date: 13 May 1912
- Summary: Pilot error

Aircraft
- Aircraft type: Flanders F.3
- Registration: n/a
- Flight origin: Brooklands Aerodrome, Surrey, United Kingdom
- Destination: Brooklands Aerodrome
- Occupants: 2
- Passengers: 1
- Crew: 1
- Fatalities: 2
- Survivors: 0

The 1912 Brooklands Flanders Monoplane crash was the first aviation accident in which an investigation was made into the cause of the accident and a report subsequently published, thus marking the start of aviation accident investigation worldwide. A Flanders F.3 Monoplane crashed at Brooklands, Surrey, United Kingdom, killing the pilot and his passenger. The cause was determined to be pilot error.

== Aircraft ==
The accident aircraft was a Flanders F.3 Monoplane. It was powered by a 60 horsepower (45 kW) Green D.4 engine.

== Accident ==
On 13 May 1912, the aircraft took off from Brooklands Aerodrome with the pilot and a passenger on board. Two circuits of the aerodrome were flown before the aircraft was seen to side-slip, stall and crash from an altitude of 200 feet (61 m). The pilot was thrown clear, but the passenger remained in the wrecked aircraft, which caught fire. Both were killed. The aircraft had been flying in a tail-low attitude before the turn was initiated. The accident was witnessed by a crowd of about 200 people. A Coroner's inquest was held in Weybridge. The jury returned verdicts of "accidental death" in both cases.

== Investigation ==
The accident was investigated by the Public Safety and Accidents Investigation Committee of the Royal Aero Club. The committee had been established on 27 February 1912. The cause was determined to be pilot error. The committee published its report on 4 June 1912 and recommended that the main committee of the Royal Aero Club publish the report in extenso. Thus the first report into an aviation accident was published in Flight on 8 June, marking the start of the science of aviation accident investigation. The report established a format of facts, analysis, conclusions and recommendations that is still in use a century later.

== See also ==
- Air Accidents Investigation Branch
