= Kauper =

Kauper or Käuper is a surname. Notable people with the surname include:

- Harry Kauper (1888–1942), Australian aviation and radio engineer
- Ole Käuper (born 1997), German footballer
- Thomas E. Kauper (1935–2025), American lawyer and legal scholar

== See also ==
- Kaupers
