= ASL Viking =

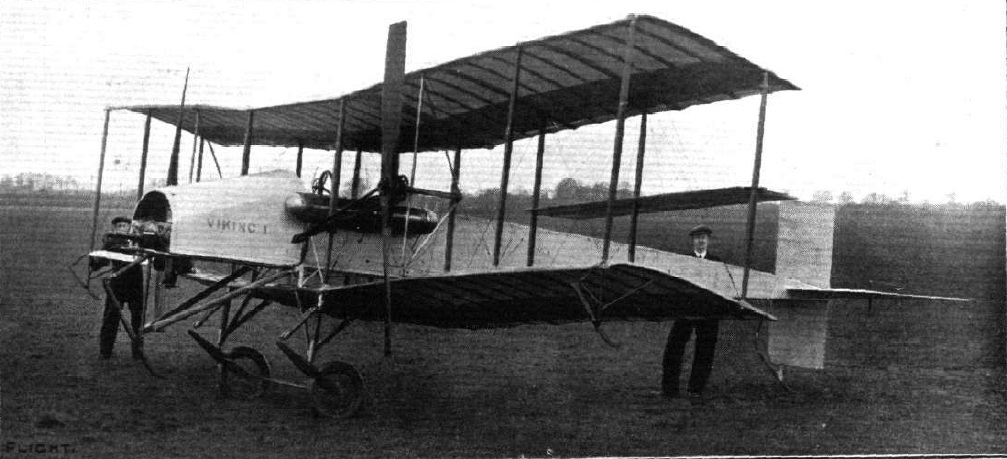

General information
- Type: Experimental aircraft
- National origin: United Kingdom
- Manufacturer: Aeronautical Syndicate Ltd
- Designer: Horatio Barber
- Number built: 1

History
- First flight: 12 January 1912

The ASL Viking was a single-engined two seater biplane aircraft designed and built by Horatio Barber's Aeronautical Syndicate Ltd. at Hendon. It was first flown in January 1912.

== Background ==
The Aeronautical Syndicate Ltd. was an enterprise established by Horatio Barber in order to promote aviation in Britain. During 1910 he had designed a number of aircraft, and in 1910 the Syndicate had leased premises at Hendon Aerodrome. Here, in addition to constructing aircraft, they had a flying school, using Barber's ASL Valkyrie canard monoplanes.

== Design and development ==
During 1911 Barber started work on a new aircraft, the Viking. This bore no resemblance to Barber's earlier aircraft, being a biplane with the control surfaces mounted at the back, in what was to become the conventional aircraft layout. The power installation was less commonplace, with a front-mounted 50 hp (37 kW) Gnome Omega rotary engine driving a pair of 8 ft 6 in (2.59 m) two-bladed wooden tractor configuration propellers mounted midway between the two wings on shafts on the inner interplane struts. The unstaggered parallel-chord wings were of three-bay configuration, with the outer interplane struts at the extreme ends of the wings and without any cabane bracing between the fuselage and upper wing. Lateral control was effected by a pair of mixed aluminium and steel ailerons attached to the rear interplane struts midway between the wings and spanning the outer two bays on each side. The rectangular fuselage, which was mounted slightly above the centre section of lower wing, was a wire-braced mixed silver spruce and ash wood construction, tapering to a horizontal knife-edge at the tail. The cockpit, which accommodated two people sitting side by side, was placed below the upper wing. The engine was covered by a semicircular section aluminium fairing which extended forward from the cockpit. Aft of this the fuselage was fabric-covered. The tail surfaces consisted of the rudder being half above the fuselage and a half below it, a wire-braced horizontal stabiliser and elevator. It had a two-wheel main undercarriage, supplemented by a central sprung skid under the nose, a sprung tailskid and sprung skids on the tip of the lower wings.

== History ==
The Viking was first flown early in 1912 and flew well, although the power installation was troublesome. Due to a lack of any commercial success Barber wound up the Aerial Syndicate in April 1912, most of its assets being acquired by Frederick Handley Page, and the Viking was the last of Barber's aircraft designs to be constructed. The Viking was sold to Hamilton Ross, manager of the Chanter Flying School at Shoreham. There it was fitted with a pair of floats, the twin propellers were replaced by a single propeller mounted directly onto the engine and the fabric covering was removed from the rear part of the fuselage.

== Specifications ==
Data from British Aircraft 1809-1906

General characteristics

- Crew: 1
- Length: 26 ft (7.9 m)
- Wingspan: 31 ft (9.4 m)
- Wing area: 310 sq ft (29 m^{2})
- Empty weight: 800 lb (363 kg)
- Powerplant: 1 × Gnome Omega 7-cyl. air-cooled rotary piston engine, 50 hp (37 kW)
- Propellers: 2-bladed 2x A.S.L. wooden fixed pitch tractor propellers, 8 ft 6 in (2.59 m) diameter

Performance

- Cruise speed: 55 mph (89 km/h, 48 kn)
- Endurance: 6 hours

== Comparable Aircraft ==
- Avro Type E
- Royal Aircraft Factory B.E. 1
- Bristol Gordon England biplanes
- Coventry Ordnance Works No. 10 and 11 biplanes
