= Robert Fenwick =

Robert Fenwick may refer to:

- Rob Fenwick (1951–2020), New Zealand businessman and environmentalist
- Bob Fenwick (1894–1973), English footballer
- Bobby Fenwick (born 1946), American baseball player
- Robert Cooke Fenwick (1882–1912), British aircraft designer
- Robert Fenwick (MP) for Northumberland (UK Parliament constituency)
