= British Army airship Beta =

Pre-WW1 British military observation dirigible

Beta 1
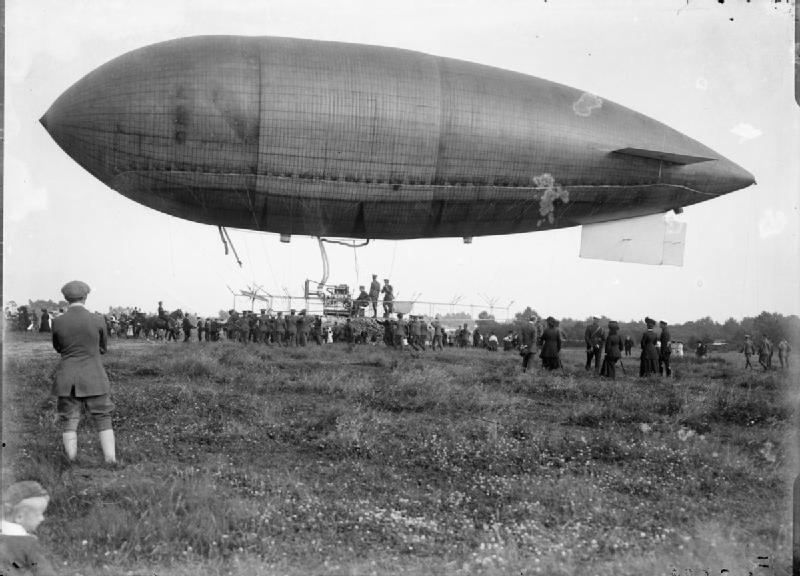
- Beta I at Farnborough

General information
- Type: Experimental aircraft, reconnaissance aircraft
- National origin: United Kingdom
- Manufacturer: Army Ballon Factory
- Number built: 1

History
- First flight: 25 April 1910

The Beta 1 was a non-rigid airship constructed for experimental purposes in the United Kingdom by the Army Balloon Factory in 1910. Reconstructed as Beta II, it was used successfully by the British Army and then by the Royal Naval Air Service as HMA No.17, and was finally struck off charge in 1916.

== Beta 1 ==
=== Design and development ===
Beta 1 used the gondola of the British Army Airship No.3 Baby, with a new envelope of rubberised fabric. Rectangular horizontal stabilisers were fitted either side of the tail together with a fixed fin with a rudder mounted on the trailing edge below the tail. A long uncovered framework suspended below the envelope held the 35 hp Green water-cooled engine, which drove a pair of 5 ft 9 in (1.75 m) diameter two-bladed propellers. An elevator was mounted on the front of this structure to provide pitch control. As first built, the engine drove a pair of propellers which could be swivelled to provide vectored thrust, but this arrangement was later replaced with a more conventional chain drive to fixed propellers.

=== Operational history ===
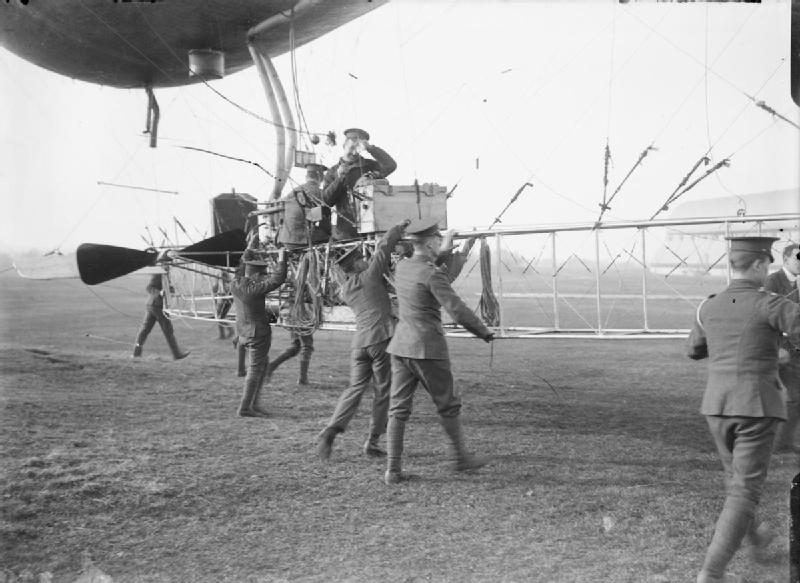
Gondola of Beta I

First flown in April 1910 at Farnborough, after which the engine was removed to make some handling experiments, during which its gondola was damaged.

After repairs a second flight lasting 70 minutes was made on 8 April, and on the night of 3–4 June 1910 it made a flight from Farnborough to London and back, setting off at 11:39 pm and returning at dawn the following morning. A second flight to London was made on 12 July under the command of Captain W. P. L. Brooke-Smith, setting off from Farnborough at 3:40 pm and, flying against a 12 mph (19 km/h) headwind, reaching central London at about six o'clock. After circling St Paul's Cathedral it returned to Farnborough, making a short diversion to demonstrate the machine to the King and Queen, who were at Aldershot.

Under the command of Colonel John Capper, Beta was flown in the British Army manoeuvres on Salisbury Plain in September, proving its utility by observing troop dispositions and dropping a sketch map of their dispositions to General Horace Smith-Dorrien.

In 1911 the first trials with radio communication were made after a return flight from Farnborough to Portsmouth. Although two-way radio contact was established, practical communication was made difficult by the noise of the engine.

== Beta II ==
The airship was rebuilt during 1912 and given a new enlarged envelope of goldbeater's skin. Its length was increased to 108 ft (33 m) and its capacity to 50,000 ft^{3} (1,400 m^{3}). The gondola was also rebuilt and the engine was replaced by a 50 hp (37 kW) Clerget driving a pair of four-bladed propellers.

Beta II made many successful flights. It took part in the 1912 army manoeuvres, fitted expementally with a machine gun.

On 20 June 1913 the Prince of Wales was taken for a half-hour flight in Beta II, under the command of Major E. M. Maitland

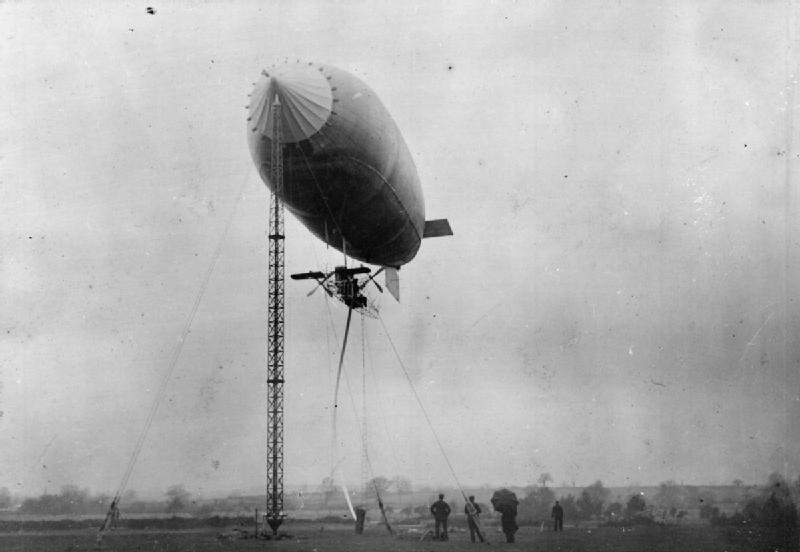
Beta II moored to a portable mast at Farnborough

It was used for the first experiments in mooring airships at a mast at Farnborough, and was also used for experiments with aerial photography; during a royal inspection of Farnborough in 1913 a photograph was taken of the royal party from the air, the plate parachuted to the ground and developed and printed in a mobile darkroom.

When all airships were taken over by the RNAS in January 1914 Beta II became HMA No.17. During December 1914 and January 1915 it was based at Firminy near Dunkirk as part of the Dunkirk Squadron and was used for artillery spotting. It was then used for training at RNAS Kingsnorth. It was struck off charge in 1916.

The gondola of the Beta II is in the collection of the Science Museum, London, but is not currently on display.

== Specifications (Beta I) ==
Data from

General characteristics

- Crew: 3
- Length: 104 ft 0 in (31.7 m)
- Diameter: 24 ft 4 in (7.42 m)
- Volume: 33,000 cu ft (930 m^{3})
- Powerplant: 1 × Green C.4 , 35 hp (26 kW)

Performance

- Maximum speed: 25 mph (40 km/h, 22 kn)
- Endurance: 5 hours
