= Robert Cooke Fenwick =

British aircraft designer

Robert Cooke Fenwick (6 October 1882—13 August 1912) was a British aircraft pioneer and designer. Fenwick was educated at South Shields High School between 1893 and 1895, leaving the school to go to school in Jersey.

After school, he became an aircraft designer. He worked at Planes Limited and worked on the Handley Page Type B, later redesigning it into the Planes Limited Biplane. He is known for designing and building the Mersey Monoplane, which competed in trials at the British Military Aeroplane Competition, on Salisbury Plain in 1912. He was granted his aviator's certificate, No. 35, on 29 November 1910.

On 13 August 1912, Fenwick lost control of his Mersey monoplane and it crashed, killing him in the process.
