= Avro Type G =

Airplane designed by A.V. Roe

Type G
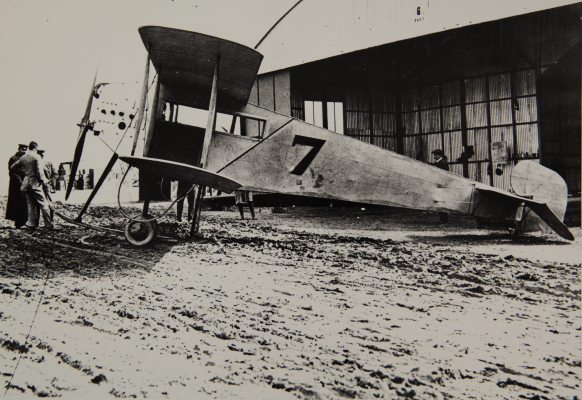

General information
- Type: Experimental aircraft
- Manufacturer: Avro
- Number built: 1

History
- First flight: August 1912

The Avro Type G was a two-seat biplane designed by A.V. Roe to participate in the 1912 British Military Aeroplane Competition. It is notable for having a fully enclosed crew compartment and for being the first aircraft to have recovered from a spin in front of witnesses.

== Design and development ==
The Avro Type G was a two-seat, two-bay biplane with a fully enclosed crew compartment. The fuselage spanned the entire gap between the upper and lower wings, which featured Roe's characteristic high aspect ratio. Two prototypes were initiated, one equipped with a Green engine and the other with an ABC engine. However, the ABC engine was not delivered in time, leading to the abandonment of the second prototype.

During the military trials, the Type G excelled in the assembly tests, being assembled in just 14½ minutes, and in the fuel consumption tests. Despite its poor rate of climb preventing it from winning a major prize, Avro was awarded £100. The Type G later set a British endurance record of 7 hours and 31 minutes, piloted by F. P. Raynham at Brooklands on 24 October, a record that was broken only an hour later by Harry Hawker.

The aircraft was the second British airplane to recover from a spin, and the first to do so in front of witnesses. On the morning of 25 August, Lt Wilfred Parke, with Lt Breton as passenger, took off for an endurance trial. After three hours of flight, Parke was performing a series of dives and entered a spin at about 700 feet (210 m). Through a combination of luck, cool nerves, and flying skill, he managed to recover at about 50 feet (15 m) above the ground, allowing the aircraft to fly off under perfect control. Parke's ability to clearly report his experience to expert witnesses was significant, as entering a spin had previously been considered almost certain death.

== Specifications ==
Data from Avro Aircraft since 1908

General characteristics

- Crew: 1
- Capacity: 1
- Length: 28 ft 6 in (8.69 m)
- Wingspan: 35 ft 3 in (10.74 m)
- Height: 9 ft 9 in (2.97 m)
- Wing area: 335 sq ft (31.1 m^{2})
- Empty weight: 1,191 lb (540 kg)
- Gross weight: 1,792 lb (813 kg)
- Powerplant: 1 × Green D.4 4-cylinder water-cooled in-line piston engine, 64 hp (48 kW)

Performance

- Maximum speed: 62 mph (100 km/h, 54 kn)
- Range: 345 mi (555 km, 300 nmi)
- Rate of climb: 105 ft/min (0.53 m/s)
