= Avro Type D =

1911 aircraft by A.V. Roe

Type D
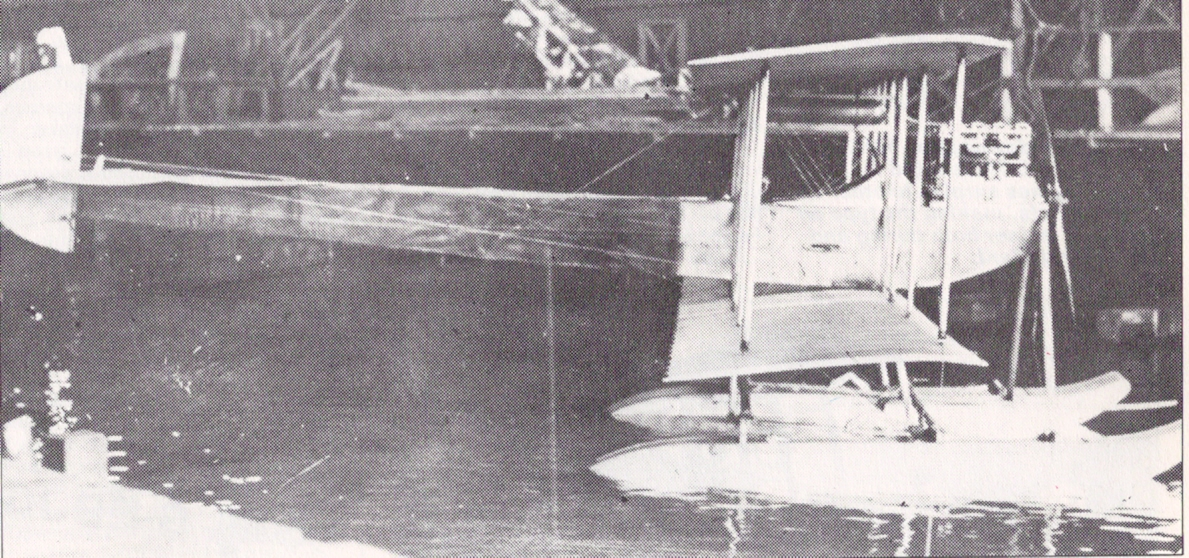
- An Avro Type D equipped as a floatplane. This particular aircraft made its first flight on 18 November 1911.

General information
- Type: Experimental aircraft
- Manufacturer: Avro
- Designer: Alliott Verdon Roe
- Number built: 7

History
- First flight: 1 April 1911

The Avro Type D was an aircraft built in 1911 by the pioneer British aircraft designer A.V. Roe. Roe had previously built and flown several aircraft at Brooklands, most being tractor layout triplanes. The Type D was his first biplane.

== Design ==
The Type D was the first biplane design by A.V. Roe. Like his earlier aircraft, the Roe IV Triplane, it was of tractor (aircraft) configuration and had a triangular section ash fuselage, divided in two-halves bolted together behind the cockpit for ease of transportation. The high aspect ratio wings were braced in an irregular three-bay layout, the interval between the pairs of interplane struts increasing from the centre section outwards. Lateral control was by wing warping. The wing was mounted directly to the lower longeron of the fuselage, at the front of which was the 35 hp (26 kW) Green water-cooled engine, with the radiator mounted flat behind it in the direction of travel under the upper wing, between the fuselage and upper wing. Behind this a small coaming protected the passenger, with the pilot sitting behind. The empennage was similar to that of the Roe IV, with a low-mounted D-shaped rudder behind a small rectangular fixed fin and a large triangular tailplane bearing D-shaped elevators. The undercarriage had two forward-projecting skids, each mounted with a pair of wheels on a short axle.

== Operational history ==
The Type D was first flown at Brooklands on 1 April 1911, piloted not by Roe but by C.H. Pixton, who reported that it was easy and pleasant to fly. This assessment was confirmed a few days later when Lt. Wilfred Parke succeeded in flying it the length of Brooklands on his first attempt at flying an aircraft. On 12 May Pixton flew the aircraft to Hendon to give a demonstration of the aircraft before the Parliamentary Aerial Defence Committee. During this occasion C.R. Samson was taken for a flight as a passenger, and A.V. Roe made his first solo flight in the aircraft. After Pixton had made a number of other flights, in June the aircraft was sold for £700 to Cdr Oliver Schwann of the Naval Airship Tender Hermione. It was sent by rail to Barrow-in-Furness, where Schwann converted it to a floatplane.

The second example built was a modified version, intended to compete in the £10,000 Daily Mail Circuit of Britain Race. As with all subsequent aircraft, the fuselage was lengthened by 2 ft (0.6 m). The central single radiator was replaced by a pair of panels mounted vertically along either side of the fuselage, and the lower wings were reduced in span, the overhang being braced by a pair of diagonal struts on either side. It was powered by a 60 hp 45 kW E.N.V. Type F. This was flown by R.C. Kemp, who was to fly it in the race. It proved to be fast, but the engine tended to overheat and the rate of climb was poor when loaded. Without Roe's approval, extensions were fitted to the lower wings, bringing them back to the original configuration. While making a short trial flight on the morning of the race, Kemp was making a fairly steep dive when the left-hand wing extension failed. The aircraft spun in from 150 ft (46 m): the aircraft was wrecked, but Kemp was unhurt.

== Floatplane development ==
Cdr Schwann covered the rear section of the fuselage, modified the tailplane, moved the radiator to a position lying flat over the wing centre section and a series of experimental floats were lashed to the skids. Taxying trials were carried out in the Cavendish Dock using narrow flat-bottomed floats. On 18 November 1911, flown by Cdr Schwann it became the first seaplane to take off from British sea water. It was reconstructed in 1912 as the Royal Aircraft Factory H.R.E.3 and was later flown as a landplane in 1913.

== Specifications ==
Data from

General characteristics

- Crew: 1
- Capacity: 1 passenger
- Length: 28 ft 0 in (8.53 m)
- Wingspan: 31 ft 0 in (9.45 m)
- Height: 9 ft 2 in (2.79 m)
- Wing area: 310 sq ft (29 m^{2})
- Gross weight: 500 lb (227 kg)
- Powerplant: 1 × Green C.4 4-cylinder water-cooled in-line piston engine, 35 hp (26 kW)
- Propellers: 2-bladed fixed-pitch propeller

Performance

- Maximum speed: 49 mph (79 km/h, 43 kn)
