= Aeronautical Syndicate =

The Aeronautical Syndicate Limited (ASL) was one of the earliest aeroplane manufacturers. A British company, it was founded in 1909 by the investor Horatio Barber and engineers William Oke Manning and Howard T. Wright. Initially located in Battersea, London, the business soon relocated to Larkhill on Salisbury Plain. It later moved to the Aeronautical Syndicate Flying School, Hendon. The company closed in 1912.

ASL were most well known as manufacturer of the ASL Valkyrie series of tail-first or canard monoplanes.

== Origins ==
Horatio Barber had made a fortune in Canada when, back in England, he met the friends William Manning and Howard Wright. They were both electrical engineers with, like Barber, a keen interest in aeronautics. In 1909 they formed the Aeronautical Syndicate Limited and Manning was appointed Chief Designer.

They first set up under a railway arch in Battersea, next to the Short Brothers who were another early aeronautical manufacturer. However ASL needed somewhere to fly their machines. They soon moved to a rented site at Durrington Down on Salisbury Plain, a location which would later become known as Lark Hill.

== Aircraft production ==
The first aircraft, the ASL monoplane No.1, was of canard layout with a pusher propeller driven by a 37 kW (50 hp) Antoinette V-8 engine. The pilot was Barber's chauffeur, Bertie Woodrow, but it was overweight and failed to fly. It was later sold off and is believed to have crashed on its first real flight.

The ASL monoplane No.2 appeared in the spring of 1910. Also of canard design, it had a 42 feet (13 m) wing-span and was powered by a rear-mounted 60 hp (45 kW) Green D.4 engine mounted above the trailing edge of the wing and driving an 8 ft 2 in (2.49 m) diameter two-bladed pusher propeller. The pilot sat immediately in front of the wing's leading edge: in front of him a square-section fuselage of uncovered wire-braced wooden construction carried the 12 ft (3.7 m) span foreplane, a small rudder and a pair of nosewheels. Woodrow flew it on many test flights, eventually crashing it when the foreplane was experimentally set at too steep an angle.

The third design was named the Valkyrie and first flew in September 1910. It was produced in significant numbers and in several variants, typically powered by a 60 hp (45 kW) Gnome Sigma engine.

ASL gained a reputation for the quality of their work and also took on commissions for other clients.

The last of the company's designs to be built was the Viking I. The tailplane stabiliser and front-mounted tractor propeller had by now become established as the conventional layout, while an increasing number of manufacturers were hedging their bets by building both monoplanes and biplanes. The Viking I emerged as a conventional tractor biplane.

== Closure ==
The Viking failed to sell. Due to the lack of any commercial prospects, the company was wound up in April 1912, most of its assets being acquired by Handley Page.
