= Blackburn Second Monoplane =

Second Monoplane

General information
- Type: experimental
- National origin: United Kingdom
- Manufacturer: Robert Blackburn
- Designer: Robert Blackburn
- Number built: 1

History
- First flight: 8 March 1911

The Blackburn Second Monoplane was strongly influenced by the French Antoinette and was much more successful than Robert Blackburn's first aircraft. The lone aircraft was built in Leeds, UK in 1910.

== Development ==
The First Monoplane was not a success, barely leaving the ground before crashing. His second machine, the Second Monoplane was very different, and resembled Léon Levavasseur's Antoinette design which Blackburn had seen in France.

The monoplane wing was rectangular with a constant chord, significant dihedral and square tips, and had a thin aerofoil section cambered on the underside, as was usual at the time. Lateral control was by wing warping. The wing was wire braced via a kingpost passing through the fuselage, extending both above and below. The fuselage was, like the wings, a wooden structure covered with fabric, triangular in section and tapering towards the tail. This was characteristically Antoinette with a long, finely tapering fin and tailplane, the rudder being divided into two triangular sections above and below the elevator, giving it clearance to move.

The pilot's seat was at the trailing edge of the wing, and contained Blackburn's "triple steering column" which was moved up and down for elevator control, from side to side to warp the wings and rotated to move the rudders. This system had been used on the First Monoplane. The undercarriage main axle was carried at the bottom end of the kingpost with wheels at either end and bearing ash fore and aft skids. During development and taxying trials, this structure was braced and sprung in different ways before the undercarriage was deemed satisfactory.

Flying was delayed by the choice of a new untried engine, a seven-cylinder radial designed by R.J.Issacson of the Hunslet Engine Co. of Leeds. This drove a wooden two-blade propeller via a 2:1 reduction gear.

The aircraft was taken to Filey on the English east coast for testing on the sands with B.C.Hucks at the controls. On 8 March 1911, after taxiing for several miles, he made the first takeoff. He flew successfully for a while at about 30 ft (10 m) and 50 mph (80 km/h), but he sideslipped into the sands when attempting his first turn.

Despite this mishap, after repair the Second Monoplane did good service at Filey as an instructional aircraft, bringing publicity to Blackburn's name and later machines.

== Specifications ==
Data from Jackson 1968, p. 59

General characteristics

- Crew: one
- Length: 32 ft 0 in (9.75 m)
- Wingspan: 30 ft 0 in (9.14 m)
- Gross weight: 1,000 lb (455 kg)
- Powerplant: 1 × Issacson seven-cylinder radial , 40 hp (30 kW)

Performance

- Maximum speed: 60 mph (95 km/h, 52 kn)
