= Vickers E.F.B.8 =

Prototype British twin-engined fighter of the First World War

E.F.B.8
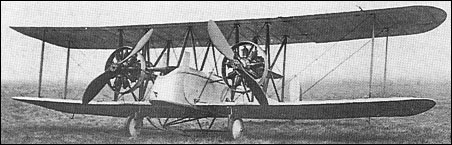

General information
- Type: Fighter aircraft
- National origin: United Kingdom
- Manufacturer: Vickers Limited
- Designer: Rex Pierson
- Status: Prototype
- Number built: 1

History
- First flight: November 1915

The Vickers E.F.B.8 was a prototype British twin-engined fighter of the First World War. It was abandoned after only one aircraft was built, single-engined fighters being considered to have superior manoeuvrability.

== Development and design ==
In autumn 1915, Vickers were working on the design of a twin-engined fighter, the E.F.B.8 (Experimental Fighting Biplane No. 8) as well as the large, cannon armed Vickers E.F.B.7. This design, which was assigned to Rex Pierson was for a smaller, machine gun armed fighter. With twice the power of Vickers' single-engined pusher Vickers F.B.5 Gunbus, which, while possessing effective armament, was too slow, the E.F.B.8 was hoped to have adequate performance. Like the E.F.B.7, the E.F.B.8 was a two-bay biplane with a steel-tube structure with plywood-and-fabric covering, being powered by two tractor Gnome Monosoupape rotary engines mounted between the wings. It was, however, much more compact, with a wingspan 20 ft (6.1 m) less and 500 lb (230 kg) lighter. The gunner, armed with a single Lewis gun was sat in the nose, while the pilot, as in the E.F.B.7, sat under the trailing edge of the wings, remote from the gunner, hindering cooperation between them in battle.

The E.F.B.8 flew in November 1915, demonstrating good performance, being the fastest twin-engined aircraft of 1915, although not as good a performance as expected. It was not considered maneuverable enough for use as a fighter, and with the prospect of better-performing single-engined fighters with synchronised guns, was rejected for production. The experience designing it proved useful to Pierson, however, when two years later, he came to develop the Vickers Vimy bomber, which was much larger but of similar layout.

== Specifications ==
Data from Vickers Aircraft since 1908

General characteristics

- Crew: 2
- Length: 28 ft 2 in (8.59 m)
- Wingspan: 38 ft 4 in (11.68 m)
- Height: 9 ft 10 in (3.00 m)
- Wing area: 468 sq ft (43.5 m^{2})
- Empty weight: 1,840 lb (835 kg)
- Gross weight: 2,610 lb (1,184 kg)
- Powerplant: 2 × Gnome Monosoupape rotary engines, 100 hp (75 kW) each

Performance

- Maximum speed: 98 mph (158 km/h, 85 kn) at 5,000 ft (1,500 m)
- Endurance: 3 hr
- Service ceiling: 14,000 ft (4,300 m)
- Time to altitude: 10 min to 5,000 ft (1,500 m)

Armament

- Guns: 1× .303 in Lewis gun in nose

== See also ==
Related development

- Vickers E.F.B.7

Aircraft of comparable role, configuration, and era

- Vickers F.B.5
