= Flanders F.4 =

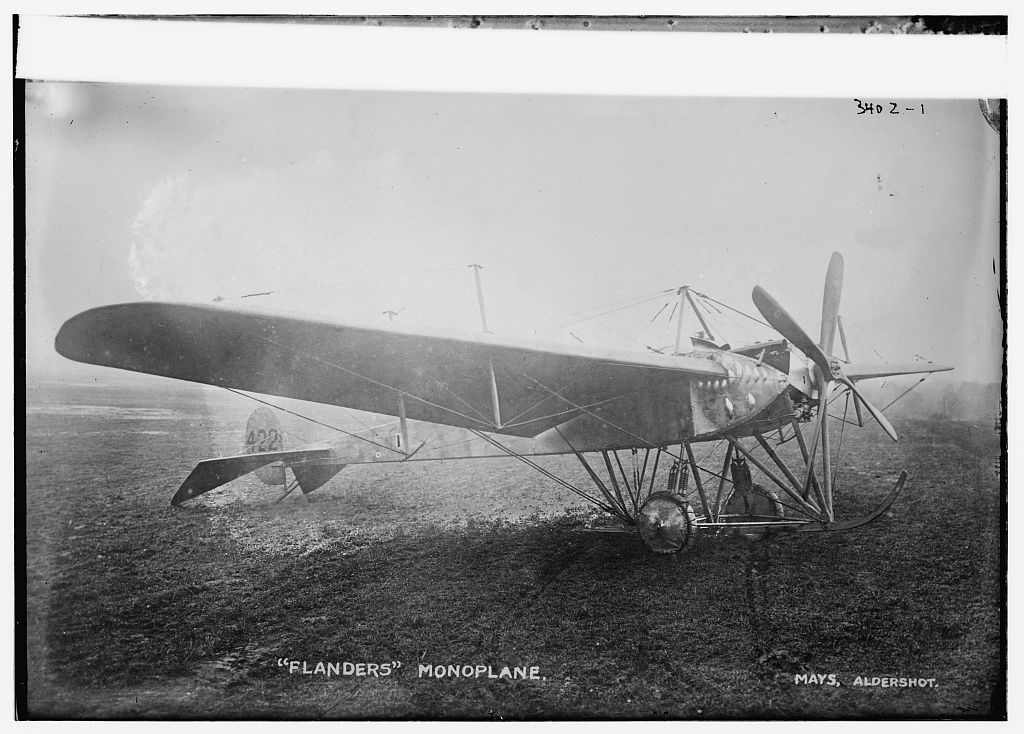

General information
- Type: Two-seat military monoplane
- National origin: United Kingdom
- Manufacturer: Howard Flanders
- Primary user: Royal Flying Corps
- Number built: 4

History
- First flight: 6 July 1912
- Retired: 1913

The Flanders F.4 was a 1910s British experimental military two-seat monoplane aircraft that was designed and built by Howard Flanders as a development of the Flanders F.3.

== Development ==
Following success with the Flanders F.3 experimental monoplane in the spring of 1912, the British War Office ordered four Flanders monoplanes for use by the newly formed Royal Flying Corps. The aircraft had the same configuration as the F.3 but was improved with larger cockpits, accommodating a crew of two in tandem, was powered by a 70 hp (52 kW) Renault engine driving a four-bladed propeller and had other modifications to improve reliability and maintainability. The fixed landing gear of the F.3 was improved with the addition of coil-spring suspension. The first aircraft was flying at Brooklands by 6 July 1912, with all four flown and delivered to the RFC by 2 January 1913. Testing showed the monoplanes flew well, but following the fatal crashes of a Deperdussin and a Bristol-Coanda Monoplane on 6 and 10 September 1912, the Royal Flying Corps had banned the use of monoplanes and the aircraft were not used, with their engines being removed to power Royal Aircraft Factory BE.2s.

== Operators ==
United Kingdom

- Royal Flying Corps

== Specifications (F.4) ==
Data from The Illustrated Encyclopedia of Aircraft (Part Work 1982–1985), 1985, Orbis Publishing

General characteristics

- Crew: Two
- Length: 31 ft 6 in (9.60 m)
- Wingspan: 40 ft 6 in (12.34 m)
- Wing area: 240 sq ft (22.30 m^{2})
- Empty weight: 1,350 lb (612 kg)
- Gross weight: 1,850 lb (839 kg)
- Powerplant: 1 × Renault 70 hp 8-cylinder Vee piston engine , 70 hp (52 kW)

Performance

- Maximum speed: 67 mph (108 km/h, 58 kn)

== See also ==
Related lists

- List of aircraft of the Royal Flying Corps
