= Short Biplane No. 2 =

Short Biplane No.2
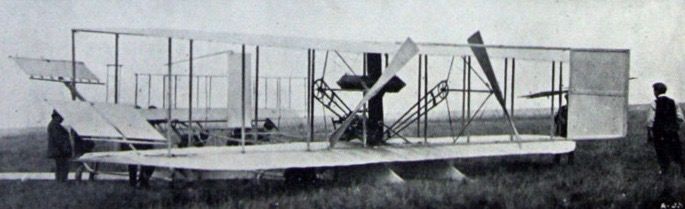

General information
- Type: Experimental aircraft
- National origin: United Kingdom
- Manufacturer: Short Brothers
- Designer: Horace Short
- Number built: 1

History
- Introduction date: 1909
- First flight: 27 September 1909

The Short No.2 was an early British aircraft built by Short Brothers for J.T.C. Moore-Brabazon. It was used by him to win the £1,000 prize offered by the Daily Mail newspaper for the first closed-circuit flight of over a mile (1.6 km) to be made in a British aircraft.

== Design and development ==
The Short No.2 was ordered from Short Brothers in April 1909 with the intention of competing for the £1,000 prize announced by the Daily Mail for the first closed-circuit flight made by a British aircraft. The layout of the aircraft was similar to that of the Wright Model A, which the Short Brothers were building under licence. It was a biplane with a forward elevator and rear-mounted tailplane, driven by a pair of pusher propellers, chain-driven by the single centrally mounted engine, but differed in a number of significant respects. It was designed to take off using a dolly and launching-rail, like the Wright aircraft, but the landing skids were incorporated into a considerably more substantial structure, each forming the lower member of a trussed girder structure resembling a sleigh, the upturned front end serving to support the biplane front elevators, behind which the rudder was mounted. A single fixed fin was mounted behind the wings on a pair of booms. Lateral control was not effected by wing-warping. Instead it used "balancing planes", each consisting of a pair of low aspect ratio surfaces, mounted at either end of a strut which was pivoted from the midpoint of struts connecting the wingtips.

== Service history ==
A 60 hp (45 kW) Green engine had been ordered to power the aircraft, but this had not been delivered when the airframe was completed in September 1909, so an Ateliers Vivinus engine, salvaged from one of Moore-Brabazon's Voisin biplanes, was fitted. Using this engine, a successful flight of nearly one mile was made on 27 September 1909 at Shellbeach on the Isle of Sheppey, where both the Short Brother's works and the Royal Aero Club's flying field were located. A second, shorter, flight was made on 4 October 1909, ending in a heavy landing which caused minor damage. While this was being repaired the Green engine was delivered and fitted, but the attempt to win the Daily Mail prize was delayed by poor weather and did not take place until 30 October 1909, when Moore-Babazon succeeded in rounding a marker post set half a mile from the takeoff point and returning to land next to the launch rail. A few days later, he responded to a challenge to disprove the saying "pigs can't fly" by making a 3 1/2-mile (5.6 km) cross-country flight with a piglet in a basket strapped to one of the interplane struts.

On 7 January 1909 it was flown the 4 1/2 miles from Shellbeach to the Royal Aero Club's new flying field at Eastchurch, by which time a revised tail consisting of elongated fixed horizontal and vertical surfaces carried on four booms had been fitted to improve stability. It was now Moore-Brabazon's intention to make an attempt to win the British Empire Michelin Cup, and on 1 March 1910 he made a flight covering 19 miles (31 km) in 31 minutes, being forced to land when the engine crankshaft broke. Although a new engine was fitted, the aircraft was due to be exhibited at the Aero Exhibition at Olympia, and was therefore not flown again until 25 March 1910, by which time it was obvious that nobody else was capable of bettering his flight, and the prize was formally awarded to him. By this time Moore-Brabazon had ordered a new aircraft of the Short S.27 type, and he made no subsequent flights in the aircraft.

== Specifications ==
General characteristics

- Crew: one
- Length: 32 ft 0 in (9.75 m)
- Wingspan: 48 ft 8 in (14.83 m)
- Wing area: 450 sq ft (42 m^{2})
- Gross weight: 1,485 lb (674 kg)
- Powerplant: 1 × Green D.4 in-line 4-cylinder water-cooled, 60 hp (45 kW)
- Propellers: 2-bladed

Performance

- Maximum speed: 45 mph (72 km/h, 39 kn)
