= Flanders F.2 =

General information
- Type: Single-seat monoplane
- Manufacturer: Richard Leonard Howard-Flanders
- Designer: Richard Leonard Howard-Flanders
- Status: Destroyed
- Number built: 1

History
- First flight: 8 August 1911
- Retired: 1912

The Flanders F.2 was a 1910s British experimental single-seat monoplane aircraft that was designed and built by Richard Leonard Howard-Flanders and later converted to a two-seater as the Flanders F.3.

== Development ==
Howard Flanders had been an assistant to A.V.Roe when he decided to design his own aircraft. In 1910 he could not get an appropriate engine for it. He started again on another monoplane design, the Flanders F.2, powered by a 60 hp (45 kW) Green engine. The F.2 was a single-seat shoulder-wing monoplane. The wing, as usual for the period, was braced by wires and kingposts. It had a fixed tailskid landing gear with bicycle-type wheels and a central skid projecting forward from between the wheels. The central skid was to stop the aircraft nosing over on rough ground. It flew for the first time on 8 August 1911.

Later in 1911 the aircraft was modified to include another cockpit forward of the pilot for a passenger. The wingspan was increased and the modified aircraft was re-designated the Flanders F.3. It flew successfully for a number of months until it was destroyed in a fatal accident on 13 May 1912, when Mr. E.V.B Fisher was piloting it with an American passenger Mr. Mason when it crashed at Brooklands, killing them both. In 1912, the War Office ordered four monoplanes based on the F.3 and designated the Flanders F.4.

== Variants ==
F.1
Unbuilt experimental monoplane
F.2
Single-seat monoplane powered by a 60hp (45 kW) Green engine.
F.3
F.2 modified as a two-seater with increased wingspan to 42 ft 0 in (12.80m).

== Specifications (F.2) ==
Data from The Illustrated Encyclopedia of Aircraft (Part Work 1982-1985), 1985, Orbis Publishing

General characteristics

- Crew: One
- Length: 31 ft 9 in (9.68 m)
- Wingspan: 35 ft 0 in (10.67 m)
- Wing area: 200 sq ft (18.58 m^{2})
- Gross weight: 1,250 lb (567 kg)
- Powerplant: 1 × Green inline engine , 60 hp (45 kW)

Performance

- Maximum speed: 60 mph (97 km/h, 52 kn)

== See also ==
- 1912 Brooklands Flanders Monoplane crash
