= Flanders B.2 =

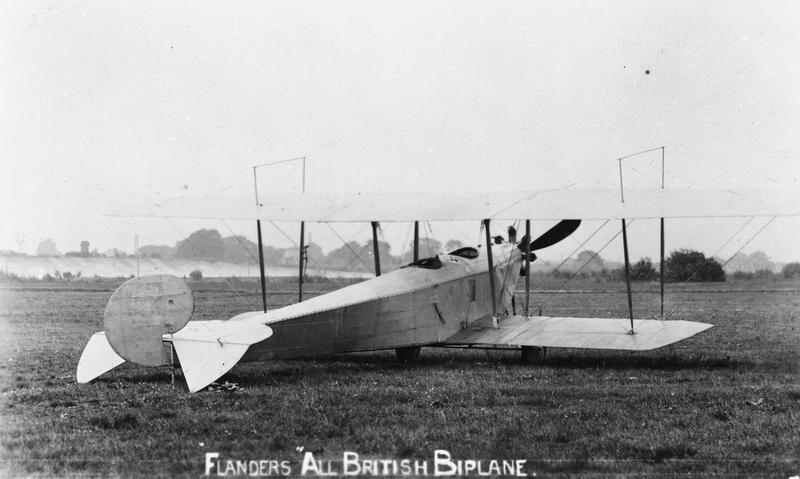

General information
- Type: Two-seat light biplane
- National origin: United Kingdom
- Manufacturer: Howard Flanders
- Designer: Howard Flanders
- Primary user: Royal Naval Air Service
- Number built: 1

History
- First flight: 22 December 1912

The Flanders B.2 was a 1910s British experimental biplane designed and built by Howard Flanders and later used by the Royal Naval Air Service (RNAS)

== Development ==
Flanders designed and built a two-seat biplane designated the Flanders B.2 to take part in military trials that were to be held on Salisbury Plain in 1912. It did not take part in the trials as an engine was not available in time. The aircraft was eventually flown with a variety of engines, with the final engine fit (a 70 hp (52 kW) Gnome rotary) the aircraft was bought in 1914 by the Admiralty and operated by the RNAS from Great Yarmouth on non-operational duties.

== Operators ==
United Kingdom

- Royal Naval Air Service

== Specifications (ABC engine as originally flown) ==
General characteristics

- Crew: Two
- Length: 31 ft 6 in (9.6 m)
- Wingspan: 43 ft 0 in (13.11 m)
- Wing area: 400 sq ft (37.16 m^{2})
- Empty weight: 607 lb (304 kg)
- Gross weight: 1,100 lb (499 kg)
- Powerplant: 1 × A.B.C inline engine , 40 hp (30 kW)

Performance

- Maximum speed: 56 mph (90 km/h, 49 kn)

== See also ==
Related lists

- List of aircraft of the Royal Naval Air Service
