= Mersey Monoplane =

General information
- Type: Experimental aircraft
- National origin: United Kingdom
- Manufacturer: Planes Limited
- Designer: Robert C Fenwick/Sydney T Swaby
- Number built: 1

History
- First flight: Late 1911

The Mersey Monoplane was a prototype two-seat British pusher configuration monoplane of the early 1910s. A single example was built and entered into the 1912 British Military Aeroplane Competition but crashed during the trials and was destroyed.

== Design and development ==
In 1909, W P Thompson of Formby, Lancashire set up Planes Limited to develop his ideas for aeroplane design, commissioning Frederick Handley Page to build a pusher configuration biplane based on his ideas, the Handley Page Type B, with much of the detailed design work for the Type B was carried out by Handley Page or by Thompson's assistant, Robert C Fenwick. Early testing of the Type B proved unsuccessful, and Handley Page abandoned the aircraft unflown. After further modification by Fenwick at Planes Limited's works at Freshfield, Formby, the aircraft flew successfully in November 1910.

Fenwick and Sydney T Swabey designed a second aircraft for Planes Limited in 1911, this being a single-engined pusher monoplane powered by a 45 hp (34 kW) Isaacson radial engine, which was mounted in the aircraft's nose, driving a two-bladed propeller by a long extension shaft. The pilot and passenger sat side-by side in the fuselage nacelle, which was mounted below the aircraft's wing, with the propeller shaft passing between them. The tail surfaces were carried on two steel tube booms, while the aircraft's undercarriage consisted of two mainwheels and long skids designed to prevent the aircraft turning over onto its nose in the event of a rough landing.

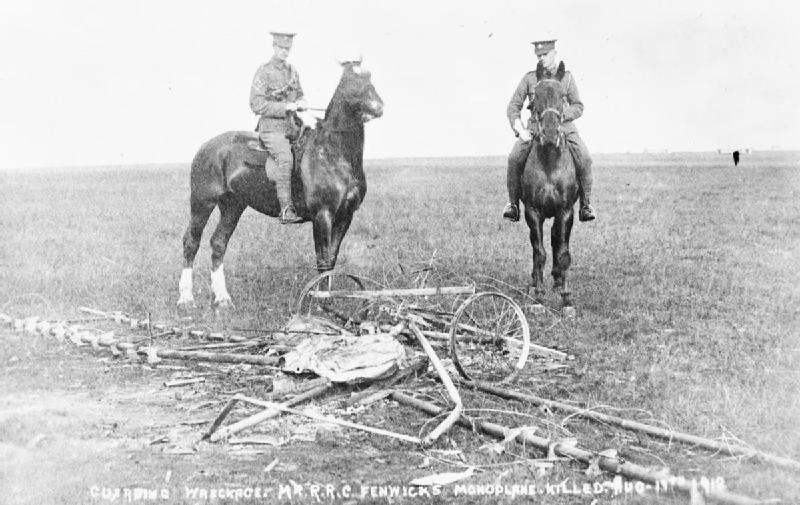
The remains of Fenwick's aircraft after the crash.

The monoplane first flew in late 1911. In April 1912, Fenwick and Swabey set up their own company, The Mersey Aeroplane Company, purchasing the monoplane from Planes Limited and continuing to operate from their works at Freshfield. It was flown frequently in the spring of 1912, often carrying passengers, including the 70-year-old Thompson, who was believed to be the oldest person to have flown at that time.

The monoplane crashed in the summer of 1912, but was rebuilt by Fenwick with the intent of entering it into the Military Trials which were to take place in August that year. The rebuilt aircraft had longer-span wings, larger tail surfaces and shorter tail booms, but retained the Isaacson radial engine.

The rebuilt aircraft flew successfully at Larkhill as part of the trials on 9 and 11 August, but when carrying out a third flight on 13 August in gusty weather conditions, dived into the ground from a height of about 200 feet (60 metres), killing Fenwick. The accident was investigated by the Royal Aero Club, and was blamed on instability of the aircraft causing Fenwick to lose control when it was caught in a powerful gust of wind.

== Specifications ==
Data from The Aeroplanes of the Royal Flying Corps (Military Wing)

General characteristics

- Crew: 2
- Length: 34 ft (10 m)
- Wingspan: 35 ft (11 m)
- Wing area: 220 sq ft (20 m^{2})
- Empty weight: 750 lb (340 kg)
- Gross weight: 1,150 lb (522 kg)
- Powerplant: 1 × Isaacson 45hp 7-cylinder radial engine, 45 hp (34 kW)

Performance

- Maximum speed: 55 mph (89 km/h, 48 kn)
- Endurance: 6 hours
