= Blackburn Type E =

Type E

General information
- Type: Military monoplane
- National origin: United Kingdom
- Manufacturer: The Blackburn Aeroplane Co. Ltd, Leeds
- Designer: Robert Blackburn
- Number built: 2

History
- First flight: April 1912

The Blackburn Type E was a development of the earlier Blackburn Mercury single-engined monoplanes, but was innovative in its use of steel tubing to construct the fuselage. It was built during 1912 to compete in the Military Aeroplane Trials. A single-seat version flew, but the military two-seater did not.

== Design and development ==
The Type E was a natural development of the line that led from the Blackburn Second Monoplane through the Mercury series. The main difference was in the construction of the fuselage, designed for military and overseas use and built with an aluminium-covered steel frame. It was the first British aircraft to have an all-metal fuselage, and with steel used in both wings and tail structures it was referred to as an all-steel aircraft.

The wings of the Type E, like those of the earlier Mercurys, were thin in cross-section and rectangular in plan. The span was the same as that of the Mercury I, but they used the construction methods of the Mercury III, with twin tubular steel spars and wooden ribs, the whole being fabric-covered. Lateral control was by wing warping. The wing, mounted in mid-position was wire-braced from above via a kingpost and below from the undercarriage. The fuselage used three steel longerons, arranged so the cross-section was a downward-pointing triangle. The Type E used the same long triangular fixed tail surfaces as the Mercury. The fixed surfaces were fabric-covered over a steel frame with ash trailing edges. The tailplane carried a single wide elevator of almost semicircular shape, and the fin carried two small triangular rudders, one above and one below the fuselage. Both were wide chord and triangular in shape.

The Type E sat high off the ground to accommodate a large propeller, almost horizontally because of a long tailskid from the fuselage to the end of the rudder post. The main undercarriage had a pair of forward-projecting skids which reached from forward of the propeller almost to the trailing edge of the wing. Each skid carried a pair of wheels on a short axle . The skids were attached to the upper fuselage longerons with a pair of near vertical struts on each side and by further bracing to the lower fuselage longeron.

Two different versions of the "all-metal" Type E were built. The first was a single-seater made for a private buyer (Lt. W. Lawrence) for use in India. It was powered by a 60 hp (45 kW) four-cylinder water-cooled inline Green engine. It first flew in April 1912. Painted grey, it acquired the name L' Oiseau Gris and was entered for the round-London Aerial Derby of June 1912, but scratched as unready. Possibly engine cooling problems caused Lawrence to abandon the aircraft.

Possibly because of these engine problems, the second Type E, intended for the Larkhill military trials taking place later in the year used a 70 hp (52 kW) air-cooled V-8 Renault engine. As required by the War Office, it was a tandem two-seater; the pilot's seat, with its Blackburn-style triple control wheel was at the trailing edge and there was a second cockpit at mid-chord, immediately behind the kingpost. On the "military machine", as it was sometimes known, there was a curved fuselage decking that extended back to the fin root as well as an additional streamlined fuel tank mounted under the fuselage at about mid-chord. This was intended to increase endurance from four to five hours; the specification called for 4.5 hours. Apart from these changes the military machine was very like the first Type E, but when tested in June 1912 it was overweight, failed to fly and was withdrawn from the Larkhill trials. Despite this failure, it attracted crowds when displayed on a Leeds school playing field late in 1912.

== Specifications (military) ==
Data from Jackson 1968, pp. 75

General characteristics

- Crew: two
- Length: 31 ft 2 in (9.50 m)
- Wingspan: 38 ft 4 in (11.68 m)
- Wing area: 290 sq ft (27 m^{2})
- Gross weight: 950 lb (431 kg)
- Powerplant: 1 × Renault 70 hp air-cooled V-8

Performance

- Maximum speed: 80 mph (130 km/h, 70 kn) estimated
- Endurance: 5 hrs estimated
