= Howard Wright biplane =

Howard Wright biplane may refer to:

- Howard Wright 1909 Biplane
- Howard Wright 1910 Biplane
