= Green C.4 =

1900s British Aircraft Piston Engine

C.4
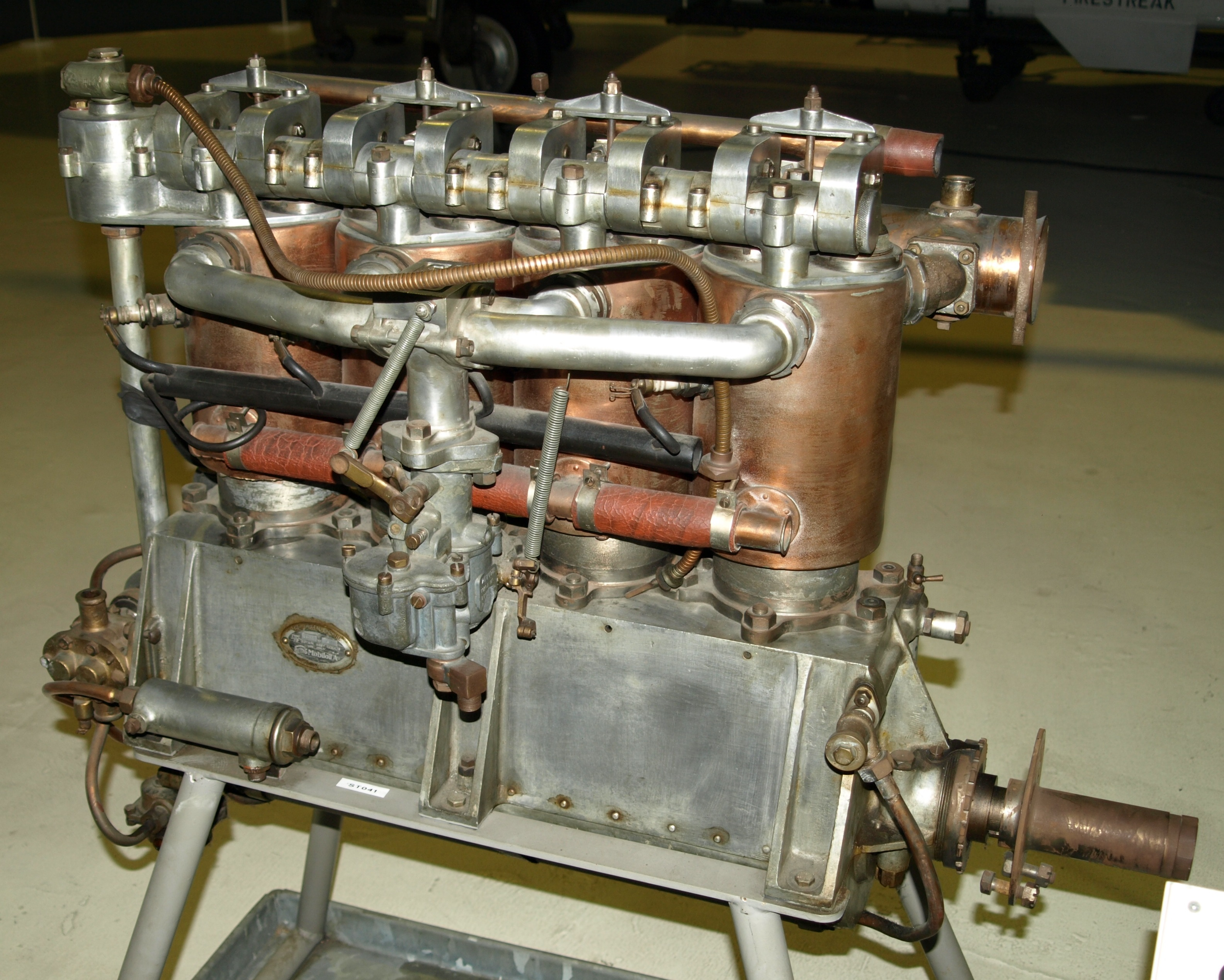
- Preserved Green C.4.
- Type: Piston aero engine
- Manufacturer: Green Engine Co Ltd
- Designer: Gustavus Green
- First run: c. 1908
- Major applications: Avro Type D

The Green C.4 was a British four-cylinder, water-cooled aero engine that first ran in 1908, it was designed by Gustavus Green and licensed by his Green Engine Co for manufacture by Aster Engineering. The engine was one of two Green designs to win a government prize.

== Applications ==
- British Army airship Beta
- ASL Valkyrie Type A
- Roe II Triplane
- Roe III Triplane
- Roe IV Triplane
- Avro Type D
- Avro Baby
- Blackburn First Monoplane
- Handley Page Type B
- Handley Page Type D
- Hornstein biplane
- Macfie Empress
- Martin-Handasyde No.3
- Neale VII biplane
- Short S.27 (Manufacturer No.s S.26 and S.28)
- Sopwith Burgess-Wright
- Wells Reo

== Engines on display ==
A preserved Green C.4 engine is on public display at the Royal Air Force Museum London. Another engine is on display at the National Museum of Flight in Scotland..

== Specifications (C.4) ==
Data from Lumsden.

=== General characteristics ===
- Type: 4-cylinder, inline, upright piston engine
- Bore: 4.13 in (105 mm)
- Stroke: 4.73 in (120 mm)
- Displacement: 253.44 cu in (4.158 L)
- Length: 39 in (991 mm)
- Width: 16 in (406 mm)
- Height: 28 in (711 mm)
- Dry weight: 184 lb (83 kg)

=== Components ===
- Valvetrain: Gear driven overhead camshaft, two valves per cylinder
- Fuel type: Petrol
- Cooling system: Water-cooled
- Reduction gear: Direct drive, right-hand tractor

=== Performance ===
- Power output: 30–35 hp (22–26 kW) nominal, 52 hp (39 kW) at 1,460 rpm (maximum power)
- Specific power: 0.2 hp/cu in (9.37 kw/L)
- Power-to-weight ratio: 0.28 hp/lb (0.46 kW/kg)

== See also ==
Related lists

- List of aircraft engines
