= Harry Kauper =

Australian aviation and radio engineer

Henry Alexis Kauper
- Born: 12 March 1888; Hawthorn, Melbourne
- Died: 22 April 1942 (aged 54); Richmond, Melbourne
- Occupation: Engineer
- Known for: Sopwith-Kauper interrupter gear Development of radio broadcasting in Australia
- Spouse: Beatrice Minnie Hooper (1919)

Henry Alexis Kauper (1888–1942) was an Australian aviation and radio engineer, known for designing the Sopwith-Kauper interrupter mechanism and for his work developing radio broadcasting in Australia.

== Biography ==
Harry Kauper (1888–1942) was born on 12 March 1888 at Hawthorn, Melbourne, the son of Charles Henry Kauper, a carpenter and later a fruit grower, and his wife Rosa Victoria.

On leaving school Kauper became an automobile mechanic, specializing in the electrical systems. He became interested in aviation after going to see the demonstrations of powered flight made by Harry Houdini in March 1910 and in May 1911, with his mechanic friends H. G. Hawker and Harry Busteed,( known as the three Harry's), Kauper went to England to study aviation. After working for Sunbeam, in June 1912 he got a job as a mechanic with Thomas Sopwith's flying school at Brooklands. Kauper later introduced Hawker to Sopwith, who employed him as a mechanic. When the Sopwith Aviation Company was formed in 1913 Kauper became foreman of works.

In August 1913 Kauper, accompanied Harry Hawker, by then qualified as a pilot, as his mechanic in the £5000 Daily Mail Circuit of Britain race. They were the only competitors to start, but had to withdraw after Hawker damaged the purpose-built floatplane when landing near Dublin. Although they had only covered two-thirds of the 1,450 mi (2,330 km) course, Hawker was awarded a prize of £1,000 and was also awarded the Royal Aeronautical Society's silver medal: Kauper was awarded a bronze medal.

In January 1914 Kauper accompanied Hawker on his trip to Australia to demonstrate the Sopwith Tabloid to the Australian Defence Department. They returned to England in June and on the outbreak of the First World War Kauper became works manager for Sopwiths. Here he developed the Sopwith-Kauper interrupter gear which allowed the firing of a machine-gun through a rotating aircraft propeller. First used in April 1916, 3,950 were fitted to Sopwith aircraft during the war. On 12 May 1919 he married Beatrice Minnie Hooper, who had also worked at Sopwiths.

In 1919 he returned to Australia and in October formed the Harry J. Butler & Kauper Aviation Co. Ltd, which pioneered commercial aviation in South Australia but went into liquidation in 1921. Kauper had become interested in radio, and in 1920 he established station 5BG, one of the earliest low-powered crystal radio transmitters in Australia, at Dulwich Hill, New South Wales.

In 1925 Kauper and George Towns built the first portable radio for the Rev. John Flynn. Powered by a generator driven by the rear wheel of Flynn's truck, it worked well but Flynn wanted a radio which did not rely on a fuel supply: in 1926 Kauper introduced Flynn to Alfred Traeger who developed the pedal wireless which was to be used by the Flying Doctor Service of Australia.

In June 1926 Kauper became the chief engineer of 5CL, Adelaide (Central Broadcasters Ltd). When 5CL was taken over by the National Broadcasting Service in January 1930 he became chief engineer for 5AD (The Advertiser Broadcasting Network, Pty) and in 1931 he became the supervisory engineer to the Melbourne station 3DB, building much of their equipment.

In 1940 he was appointed to the Australian Aeronautical Inspection Directorate and put in charge of the radio, electrical and instrument section.

He died on 22 April 1942 of coronary vascular disease.
