= Grahame-White Type X =

Type X Charabanc
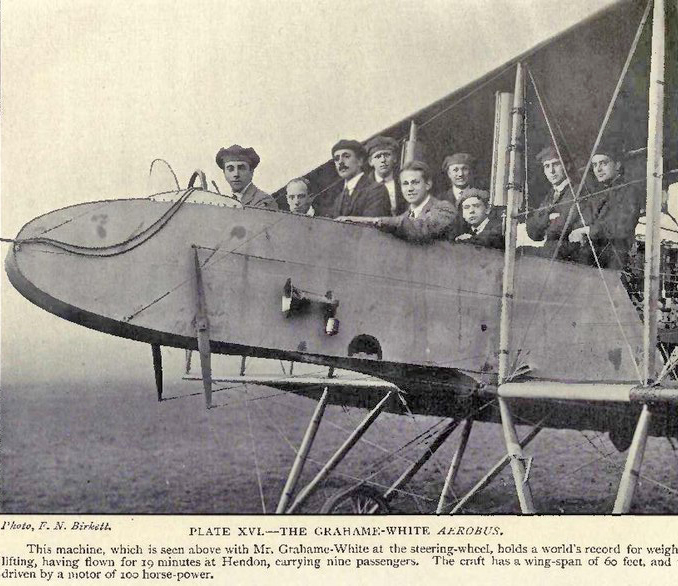

General information
- Type: Five-seat passenger-carrying biplane
- Manufacturer: Grahame-White Aviation Company
- Designer: J. D. North
- Number built: 1

History
- First flight: 1913

The Grahame-White Type X Charabanc or Aerobus was a 1910s British passenger-carrying biplane designed and built by the Grahame-White Aviation Company based at Hendon Aerodrome, North London.

== Development ==
The Charabanc was built by the Grahame-White company to meet the demand for passenger-carrying flights, which could not be satisfied by the existing two-seat designs. Designed by J. D. North, it was an unequal-span pusher biplane, with ailerons on both upper and lower wings, and a biplane tail unit with three rudders mounted on booms. An elongated nacelle mounted on the lower wing housed the pilot in the front, plus four passengers in two rows of two seats behind. The wing spars, tail booms and outer interplane struts were of hollow section spruce, and the nacelle and inner struts were of ash.

It first flew in 1913, powered by a 120 hp (89 kW) Austro-Daimler engine, and in this form was flown by Louis Noel with seven passengers aboard to set a British world record on 22 September 1913. On 2 October 1913, he set a world record in carrying nine passengers, staying aloft for nearly twenty minutes. To meet the entry requirements for the 1913 Michelin Cup, which required an all-British aircraft, this was replaced by a British-built 100 hp (75 kW) Green E.6 engine. The Charabanc went on to win the cup, covering a distance of over 300 miles on 9 November 1913, piloted by R.H. Carr.

The first parachute descent from an aircraft in Great Britain was made by W. Newell from the aircraft, at Hendon on 9 May 1914.

== Specifications ==
Data from The Illustrated Encyclopedia of Aircraft (Part Work 1982–1985), 1985, Orbis Publishing, p. 1998

General characteristics

- Crew: 1
- Capacity: 4 passengers
- Length: 37 ft 6 in (11.43 m)
- Wingspan: 62 ft 6 in (19.05 m)
- Wing area: 790 sq ft (73.39 m^{2})
- Empty weight: 2,000 lb (907 kg)
- Gross weight: 3,100 lb (1,406 kg)
- Powerplant: 1 × Green E.6 6-cylinder inline piston , 100 hp (75 kW)

Performance

- Maximum speed: 51 mph (82 km/h, 44 kn)
- Cruise speed: 45 mph (72 km/h, 39 kn)
