= Horatio Barber =

British aviation pioneer (1875–1964)

Horatio Claude Barber
- Born: 1875; Croydon, London, England
- Died: 1964 (aged 88 or 89); Jersey, Channel Islands
- Military career
- Branch: Royal Flying Corps; Royal Air Force
- Rank: Captain
- Conflicts: World War I

Captain Horatio Claude Barber (1875–1964) was an early British aviation pioneer and First World War flight instructor. In 1911 he flew the first cargo flight in Britain, transporting electric light bulbs from Shoreham to Hove. He was also the first person in Great Britain to gain an aeronautical degree.

== Biography ==
Barber was one of the first aviation pioneers and within a few years of the first powered flight he leased a railway arch in Battersea to design and produce aircraft. In 1909 he moved to Lark Hill on Salisbury Plain and formed the Aeronautical Syndicate Limited to produce his designs. In early 1910 he began to fly his designs and in late September 1910 he became the first occupant of Hendon Aerodrome, newly established by the London Aerodrome Co, where he leased three hangars. His ASL Valkyrie design started test flying from there in October 1910, Barber using the aircraft to gain his Aero Club Certificate (No. 30) in November of that year. The company gave four Valkyries to the government and one aircraft and military pilot were lost in an accident in September 1911. Barber carried on with some experimental work, producing a tractor biplane called the ASL Viking early in 1912, but in April 1912 he dissolved the Syndicate, having failed to achieve any commercial success. The company's aircraft and equipment were sold, mostly to Frederick Handley Page. Barber continued to work as an aeronautical consultant, with an office at 59 Pall Mall in London.

In 1912 he tried to insure himself against any liability from passengers of his aircraft, this was unknown at the time and Lloyd's asked him to write his own policy, the first aircraft insurance policy.

Barber served in the First World War in the Royal Flying Corps (RFC) and later the Royal Air Force (RAF). He was one of the first flying instructors at Shoreham and he also invented a number of training aids. In 1917 he published a book The Aeroplane Speaks and in 1927 Aerobatics. After the war he continued his involvement in aircraft insurance.

He died in 1964.

== Legacy ==
A replica of his Valkyrie design is on display at Fantasy of Flight in Polk City, Florida.
