= Sopwith 1913 Circuit of Britain floatplane =

Sopwith 1913 Circuit of Britain Biplane
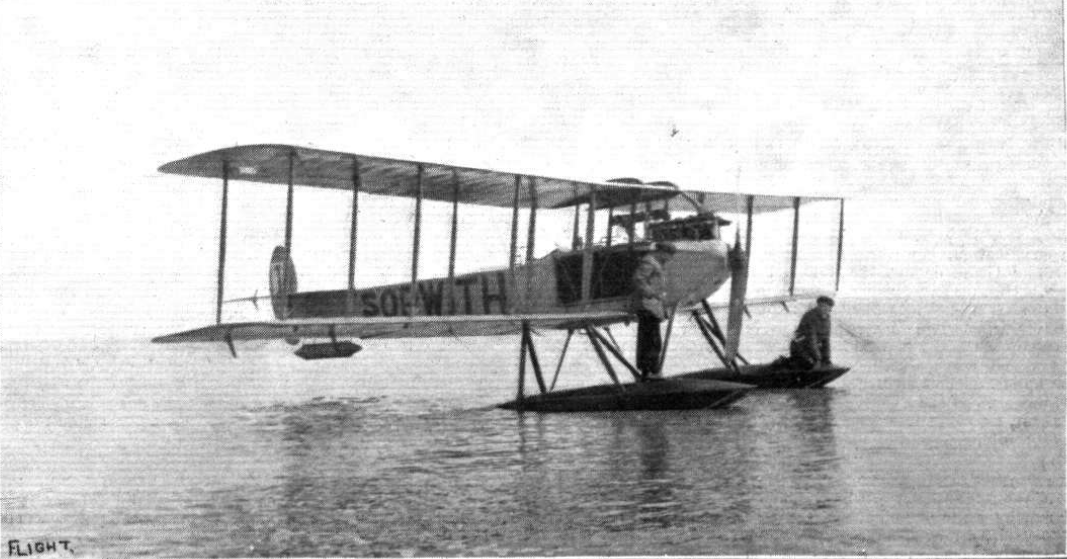

General information
- Type: Racing aircraft
- Manufacturer: Sopwith Aviation Company
- Number built: 1

History
- First flight: 1913

The Sopwith 1913 Circuit of Britain Biplane was a British floatplane built by Sopwith to take part in the 1913 Daily Mail Circuit of Britain Air race. The only entrant to start, it had to be withdrawn after a landing accident two-thirds of the way through the race.

== Design and development ==
The Circuit of Britain biplane was a four-bay tractor biplane with a square-section fuselage with the forward part covered with aluminium back to the aft cockpit and the remainder covered with fabric. The forward sections of the longerons were made of ash and the rear sections of spruce. Lateral control was effected by ailerons on both the upper and lower wings, which were staggered and had spruce spars spindled to an I section and hollow interplane struts. The tail surfaces consisted of unbalanced elevators mounted on the large semi-circular tailplane and an aerodynamically balanced rudder, with no fixed vertical surface. The single step main floats had a framework of ash and spruce covered with two layers of cedar and were divided into three watertight compartments. It was powered by a 100 hp (75 kW) Green E.6, the radiators of which were placed either side of the fuselage.

== Operational history ==
The competition was to start at Southampton on Saturday 16 August, the rules permitting the attempt to take place during any 72-hour period before the end of the month. Of the four entrants to the race, the Sopwith, piloted by Harry Hawker with Harry Kauper as passenger, was the only aircraft to start. Samuel Cody had been killed while testing the aircraft he had built for the competition, the aircraft entered by James Radley and Gordon England had been damaged during trials and Francis McClean's Short biplane was delayed by engine problems which kept it from competing.

Hawker and Kauper started shortly before noon and reached Great Yarmouth on the East Anglian coast at 4.38. where Hawker collapsed shortly after landing. This was ascribed to sunstroke but may have been due to Carbon monoxide poisoning. (The exhaust pipe of the aircraft was subsequently lengthened, but this may have been to reduce noise). Under the competition rules there was no flying on the Sunday, so an attempt was made to resume the flight on the Monday, with Sydney Pickles taking over as pilot, but this was impossible due to deteriorating weather conditions.

A second start was allowed by the race authorities, and the aircraft was returned to Southampton by rail. The second attempt started on Monday 25 August when Hawker and Kauper took off at 5.30 am. Flying via Ramsgate, Yarmouth and Scarborough, Seaham - where an unscheduled hour stop was made to effect repairs and replace lost radiator water - and ending the day at Beadnell, about 20 mi (32 km) short of the control point at Berwick-on-Tweed, due to one of the radiator hoses having been burnt through. The next day they left Beadnell at 8.05, stopping at Montrose, Aberdeen and Cromarty and reaching Oban on the west coast of Scotland at six in the evening, and took off on the third day at 5.42 am; after a stop at Kiells due to engine problems Larne was reached at 9.30. At 11 they took off for Dublin, but a few miles short of their destination Hawker decided to land in order to make adjustments to the engine valves. Unfortunately his foot slipped from the rudder bar and the aircraft sideslipped into the water, breaking Kauper's arm and damaging the aircraft too seriously for the flight to be continued.

Although they had only covered two-thirds of the 1,450 mi (2,330 km) course, Hawker was awarded a prize of £1,000 and was also awarded the Royal Aeronautical Society's silver medal; Kauper was awarded a bronze medal.

== Specifications ==
Data from Lewis 1962

General characteristics

- Crew: 2
- Length: 31 ft 0 in (9.45 m)
- Wingspan: 49 ft 6 in (15.09 m)
- Wing area: 500 sq ft (46 m^{2})
- Empty weight: 1,580 lb (717 kg)
- Gross weight: 2,400 lb (1,089 kg)
- Powerplant: 1 × Green E.6 6-cylinder inline water cooled piston engine , 100 hp (75 kW)

Performance

- Cruise speed: 65 mph (105 km/h, 56 kn)

== Other 1913 Circuit of Britain aircraft ==
- Cody floatplane
- Radley-England waterplanes
