= Blackburn First Monoplane =

British aircraft

First Monoplane
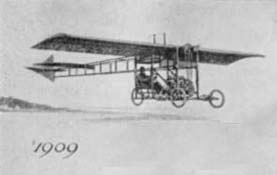

General information
- Type: Experimental aircraft
- Manufacturer: Robert Blackburn
- Designer: Robert Blackburn

History
- Manufactured: 1
- First flight: 24 May 1909

The Blackburn First Monoplane (also known as Monoplane No 1) was a British experimental aircraft constructed by Robert Blackburn in 1909.

== Design and development ==
The First Monoplane was a high-wing monoplane with the engine and pilot's seat located on a three-wheeled platform. A cruciform tail was carried on an uncovered boom extending from the wing. The 8 ft 6 in (2.59 m) propeller was mounted just below the wing's leading edge and driven by a chain to the 35 hp (26 kW) Green engine below.

Designed during a stay in Paris, construction began at Thomas Green & Sons engineering works at Leeds, where Blackburn's father was general manager and was later relocated to workshop space in a small clothing factory. When complete, it was transported to the beach between Saltburn and Marske for testing from April 1909. In that year, only taxying trials with the occasional hop were made. The only flight – on 24 May 1909 – lasted for around one minute, and ended in a crash in which the aircraft was damaged beyond repair. Blackburn later recalled the incident thus:

After racing along the sands what seemed a dizzy speed, the machine certainly did take off and then started a series of wobbles due to deviating from the straight and the low centre of gravity which I fear took charge.... I had probably been in the air for a minute only, but it seemed ages when I eventually pulled myself together and looked at the wreckage. Thus terminated my first attempt at flight, with no personal injuries other than bruises and cuts but with the total wreckage of months of laborious work.

== Survivors ==
The only aircraft was destroyed but a replica of the aircraft was constructed by members of the Brough Heritage Group and is displayed at the Brough Heritage Centre.

== Specifications ==
Data from Blackburn Aircraft since 1909

General characteristics

- Crew: 1
- Length: 23 ft 0 in (7.01 m)
- Wingspan: 24 ft 0 in (7.32 m)
- Height: 9 ft 6 in (2.90 m)
- Wing area: 170 sq ft (16 m^{2})
- Gross weight: 800 lb (363 kg)
- Powerplant: 1 × Green C.4 4-cylinder water-cooled in-line piston engine, 35 hp (26 kW)
- Propellers: 2-bladed fixed-pitch propeller

Performance

- Maximum speed: 60 mph (97 km/h, 52 kn) (estimated)
