= Howard Wright 1909 Biplane =

- Cigarette card illustration of Howard Wright's 1909 biplane

General information
- Type: Experimental aircraft
- National origin: United Kingdom
- Manufacturer: Howard Wright
- Designer: Howard T. Wright
- Number built: 1

History
- First flight: 1909

The Howard Wright 1909 Biplane was an early British experimental aircraft designed and built by Howard T. Wright. It was displayed at the first Aero Show at Olympia in March 1909, and although only one was built, it was the first of a series of aircraft built by Wright that were to earn him brief fame as one of England's foremost aircraft manufacturers in the early years of flight.

== Development and design ==
Howard Wright was an engineer who had previously worked with Hiram Maxim and built a number of experimental helicopters designed by Federico Capone. In December 1908 he was asked to build an aircraft by Malcolm Serr Keaton. Wright's design was of similar layout to the contemporary Voisin aircraft, being a pusher biplane with a front-mounted elevator and a rear-mounted box-like biplane tail with elongated fixed end-surfaces and a single central rudder. Wright's aircraft differed in some details from Voisin's designs, most obviously in having biplane front elevators and an undercarriage consisting of a single wheel carried by a pyramid of struts in front of the wings, with supplementary wheels on either wingtip and a tailwheel. This arrangement resembled that of the REP monoplane which had been displayed along with examples of Voisin aircraft at the Paris Aero Salon that December, and was intended to provide a degree of experience in lateral control of the aircraft without actually lifting off.

The fuselage was a tapered box-girder fabricated from welded steel tubes, the pilot's seat being under the wings leading edge with the engine behind him. This was a 50 hp Metallurgique which drove the aircraft's most novel feature, a pair of contra-rotating two bladed propellers driven by a patented 3:1 reduction gearbox. The wings had ash spars and spruce ribs, with Voisin-style "side-curtains" between the ends of the wings. Lateral control was by means of four small ailerons fitted to the trailing edges of both wings, a feature not found on Voisin's aircraft. The fabric-covered wood tail assembly was carried on steel booms. Steel tube was also used for the interplane struts, these being of a special streamlined section.

== Flight trials ==
The aircraft was finished in time to be displayed at the 1909 Olympia Aero Exhibition, after which it was taken to the "flying field" established by Noel Pemberton Billing at Fambridge in Essex. After a journey in which the aircraft suffered damage first when the wagon carrying it was driven into a railway bridge and again when manhandling it across a ditch surrounding the airfield, further damage occurred when Wright's shed was demolished by a storm. The aircraft had been repaired by May, and trials began supervised by William Oke Manning, who may also have contributed to the aircraft's design. On testing the engine inexplicably over-revved, shearing the propeller shaft and causing the propeller to disintegrate spectacularly, sending fragments through the iron roof of the shed and damaging the tail booms. Repairs were complete by June, when Seaton Kerr began ground trials. Some satisfactory flights were achieved, but the ground at Fambridge was too rough, and the aircraft was taken to Camber Sands where the aircraft was flown successfully.

An insight into the conditions faced by early aviators is provided by a letter by Seaton-Karr on the subject of the lack of suitable flying fields sent to the editor of Flight, and published in the issue of 30 October 1909. After rather plaintively wishing that "The surface should be not worse than a fairly rough football ground, and the entire ground should be as flat as possible, and with no ditches or obstacles, such as fences, &c.", he then asks that "Absolute privacy should be obtained—anyhow, the right to turn people off—as nothing is more trying than to have a lot of people asking silly questions, and poking sticks and umbrellas through the planes (by no means an unusual occurrence, I assure you)."

== Specifications ==
Data from Ransome, S and Fairclough, R English Electric Aircraft and their predecessors p.82

General characteristics

- Crew: 1
- Length: 43 ft (13 m)
- Wingspan: 40 ft (12 m)
- Wing area: 620 sq ft (58 m^{2})
- Gross weight: 1,600 lb (726 kg)
- Powerplant: 1 × Metallurgique driving contra-rotating two-bladed propellers , 50 hp (37 kW)
- Propellers: 2-bladed, 8 ft (2.4 m) diameter contra-rotating

Performance
