= Handley Page Type B =

Type B (H.P.2) (Planes Limited Biplane)

General information
- Type: Experimental biplane
- National origin: United Kingdom
- Manufacturer: Handley Page
- Number built: 1

History
- First flight: 29 November 1910

The Handley Page Type B was an unusual single-engined pusher biplane built by Handley Page at the commission of a Liverpool patent agent. Damaged before its first flight, Handley Page disowned it, but it was rebuilt and flew for a time in 1910 as the Planes Limited Biplane.

== Design and development ==
Despite the company type letter and its retrospective designation as the H.P.2, the Type B biplane was only partly Handley Page's work. It was conceived by W.P. Thompson of Freshfield, near Formby in Lancashire, who had registered ideas of aircraft control by variable wing area and centre of gravity movement and was keen to build an aircraft with "pendulum stability", i.e. with most of its mass mounted flexibly below the wings. Apparently he originally thought in terms of a tailless machine. In 1909 he commissioned Handley Page to build a prototype. This was done at Barking with input from both Handley Page and Thompson's assistant Robert Fenwick.

The Type B had a standard fabric-covered spruce frame. The wide gap biplane wings were of two-bay form though in the absence of a fuselage between the wings there were further interplane struts. Two tail booms, each based on a cross-braced pair of members joined to the upper and lower wings, supported a biplane tail. Between the tailplanes were a pair of linked rudders.

The Type B had no fuselage: the 60 hp (45 kW) Green four-cylinder inline water-cooled engine was flexibly mounted below the lower wing and drove a pair of pusher propellers, mounted at lower wing level, via a pair of chains. The pilot sat ahead of the engine attached to it between a pair of mainwheels. A pair of small wingtip wheels was added for stability.

The undercarriage collapsed on the first attempt at flight in late 1909 before the aircraft left the ground. During repairs, a storm caused more damage and Handley Page decided to have no more to do with what he considered a failure and nicknamed it "The Scrapheap". He did allow Fenwick, financed by Thompson to complete the repairs and modifications at Barking, including the addition of ailerons and the replacement of the chain-driven pair of propellers by a single direct-drive propeller. This work was completed by mid-1910 and Thomson had the machine transported to Freshfield, where he had established an organisation named Planes Limited and had a flying field. On 29 November 1910 the Type B finally flew, performing well enough for Fenwick to be granted Royal Aero Club pilot's certificate. By this time it was known as the Planes Limited Biplane. It crashed a few days later in poor weather, but was rebuilt once more and flew from nearby Formby sands.

== See also ==
Mersey Monoplane, the second design by Planes Limited.
