= ASL Valkyrie =

- Valkyrie type B 'Racer'

General information
- Type: Experimental aircraft
- National origin: British
- Manufacturer: Aeronautical Syndicate Ltd
- Designer: Horatio Barber
- Number built: ~11

History
- Manufactured: 1910-1911
- First flight: 1910

The ASL Valkyrie was a canard pusher configuration aircraft designed by the Aeronautical Syndicate Ltd in 1910. Examples were widely flown during 1911 and were used for instructional purposes at the ASL flying school, which was the first occupant of Hendon Aerodrome in London.

== Design and development ==
Following two designs styled simply monoplanes Nos. 1 and 2, ASL's third design was called the Valkyrie. All three were of tail-first or canard layout with rear-mounted engines and pusher propellers.

The Valkyrie A or Valkyrie I took place over the summer of 1910 and the aircraft was first flown in October 1910 at the newly established Hendon Aerodrome, where the ASL had leased three hangars next to those occupied by the Blériot school. Although this aircraft shared the same canard configuration as its predecessor, there were significant alterations. It was powered by a 35 hp 4-cyl Green C.4 engine mounted in front of the leading edge of the wing, driving a 7 ft 3 in (2.21 m) pusher propeller directly in front of the centre-section of the wing, the leading edge of which was set back from that of the outer sections. A pair of foreplanes, one fixed and the other moveable, were mounted on a pair of widely spaced wire-braced mahogany side-frames, each having a straight upper boom and a curved lower member. The twin rudders were initially mounted on the kingposts at the rear of these frames, in line with the trailing edge of the wing but after trials were moved aft, each being mounted on two short booms. In addition a small area of the sideframes at the front of the aircraft was given a fabric covering.

Work was immediately started on two more aircraft, both with the same general arrangement. The first to fly, on 12 November, was a smaller aircraft referred to as the Racer or Valkyrie B. A larger machine, the Passenger Carrier or Valkyrie C was flown a few days later and is sometimes referred to as the Valkyrie II, its works number. The first Type B built is sometimes referred by its works number as the Valkyrie III. Both types were of broadly similar layout and construction to the Valkyrie A, differing principally in size and the engine that was used. The Type B, which seated two people side by side in front of the leading edge, was powered by a 50 hp (37 kW) Gnome rotary engine and had a wingspan of 31 ft (9.4 m) The Type C, which seated three people, was powered by a 60 hp Green water-cooled engine and had a wingspan of 39 ft (12 m). At least twelve were constructed, the last of these in early 1912. Most of the aircraft constructed were Type B, at least one of which was fitted with dual controls.

== Operational history ==
Although they were considered tricky to fly, by contemporary standards the Valkyrie monoplane was a successful design. Most of the aircraft produced were used for training and exhibition purposes, principally at the ASL's flight school at Hendon. On 25 May 1911 a six-week-old Valkyrie from the Valkyrie school crashed killing the student pilot Bernard Benson, only the third Briton to be killed in an aircraft accident. On 4 July 1911 a Valkyrie flown by Barber carried a box of light-bulbs from Shoreham to Hove, the first commercial air cargo flight in Britain. Barber gave the £100 he was paid to charity. Another notable early flight was made when Miss Eleanor Trehawke Davies chartered Barber to fly her from Hendon to Brighton and back. The flight, hampered by cloud and high winds, took two days. Miss Trehawke Davies was a notable flying enthusiast, and was later to become the first passenger to be carried between London and Paris.

Four aircraft were given to the War Office to promote military aviation in Britain. One of these crashed at Hendon on 17 September 1911 when on a trial flight after a new engine had been fitted: the pilot, Lieutenant Reginald Archibald Cammell was killed. The accident was not considered to be due to faults in the aircraft, but to have been caused by Cammell's lack of experience with the aircraft. Two aircraft were delivered to Eastchurch in September 1911, but were not flown there. On 28 September 1911 C. R. Samson reported them unairworthy, needing extensive refurbishment. This was not considered worthwhile, since Samson did not consider them suitable for instructional work.

== Specifications (Valkyrie 'B') ==
Data from Lewis, P. British Aircraft 1809-1914

General characteristics

- Crew: 1
- Capacity: 1 passenger
- Length: 26 ft 0 in (7.92 m)
- Wingspan: 31 ft 0 in (9.45 m)
- Wing area: 168 sq ft (15.61 m^{2})
- Empty weight: 550 lb (249 kg)
- Powerplant: 1 × Gnome Omega rotary, 50 hp (37 kW)

Performance

- Maximum speed: 70 mph (110 km/h, 61 kn)
