= Richard Leonard Howard-Flanders =

British aviation pioneer and manufacturer

- Born: 4 September 1882; Milan, Italy
- Died: 12 August 1939 (aged 56); Bristol, England
- Occupation: Aeronautical Engineer
- Known for: Aircraft designer

Richard Leonard Howard-Flanders FRSA AMIMechE (1882 – 1939) was an early British aircraft designer and manufacturer.

== Early life ==
Richard Leonard Flanders (later Howard-Flanders) was born in Italy to British parents in 1882. He was educated at Emmanuel College, Cambridge and then served an engineering apprenticeship at Brazil Straker and Company of Bristol. In 1909 he joined A.V. Roe before forming his own company (L. Howard Flanders Limited) at Brooklands Aerodrome in 1910.

== Aircraft designer ==
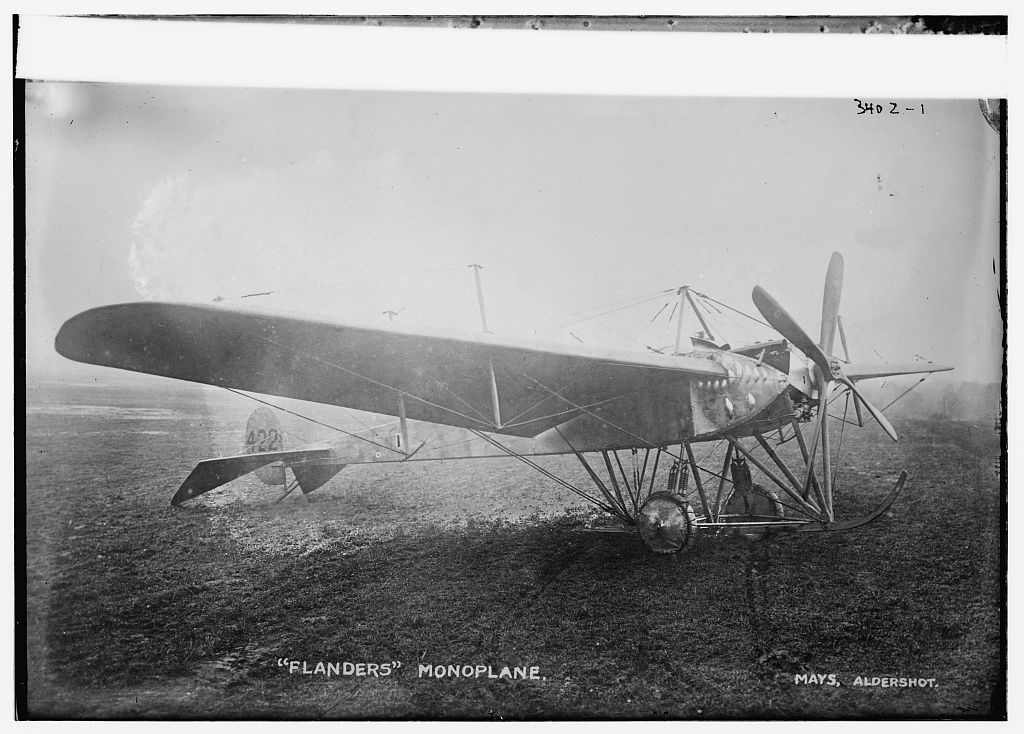
Flanders F.4 of 1912

He designed a built a series of monoplanes including the Flanders F.4 that was entered in the Military Trials of 1912. It was damaged and unable to compete in the trials. A small number of his aircraft were built for the British Army. Howard-Flanders had a serious motorcycle accident and during his convalescence his company had to close down. He joined the aircraft department of Vickers Limited and later in 1917 moved to the engine section. After he left Vickers he worked for a number of companies including English Electric and the Bristol Aeroplane Company. In 1921 he was registered with the Teachers Registration Council when he was Assistant Master at the Regent Street Polytechnic from 1920 to 1923 In the 1930s he was secretary of the British Gliding Association.

== Family life ==
Howard-Flanders married Millicent Franks in 1914. He died in 1939 in Bristol aged 56.
