= Gustavus Green =

British engineer and designer of early airplane engines

Gustavus Green (11 March 1865 – 29 December 1964) was a British engineer who made significant contributions to the design of early aircraft engines.

He was born in Hounslow on 11 March 1865. He opened a bicycle factory in Bexhill-on-Sea, and in 1905, built his first lightweight, water-cooled aircraft engine. He established the Green Engine Co. to manufacture them. Early Green engines were used by British aviation pioneers such as Alliott Verdon Roe and Samuel Cody, but his later engines proved too heavy for the aircraft of that time. However, they were utilized to power torpedo boats during World War I.

In 1909, Green was awarded a £1,000 prize by the British government for his work on aero engines, and he was awarded another prize of £5,000 in 1914.

After World War II, Green became involved in the development of the 'flexible deck' concept for aircraft carriers. His ideas for such a deck culminated in the successful landing of a de Havilland Sea Vampire, flown by Eric "Winkle" Brown, on an experimental rubber deck installed on HMS Warrior.

Green became an honorary companion of the Royal Aeronautical Society in 1958. He died in December 1964, at his home in Twickenham, only a few months before what would have been his 100th birthday.

== See also ==
- Green C.4
