= S30 =

S30 may refer to:

== Automobiles ==
- Aeolus S30, a Chinese sedan
- Jinbei S30, a Chinese SUV
- Nissan S30, a Japanese sport car
- Toyota Crown (S30), a Japanese sedan

== Aviation ==
- Blériot-SPAD S.30, a French sport aircraft
- Lebanon State Airport, in Linn County, Oregon, United States
- SABCA S-30, a Belgian light aircraft
- Short S.30 Empire, a British flying boat
- Sikorsky S-30, a proposed American biplane transport

== Electronics ==
- Canon PowerShot S30, a digital camera
- Nikon Coolpix S30, a digital camera
- Samsung M810 Instinct S30, a mobile phone
- Series 30, a mobile phone software platform

== Rail and transit ==
- S30 (RER Fribourg), a regional rail line in Switzerland
- S30 (TILO), a regional railway service in Ticino, Switzerland, and Lombardy, Italy
- S30 (ZVV), a Zurich S-Bahn line in the cantons of Thurgau and Zurich, Switzerland
- Kuromatsunai Station, in Suttsu District, Hokkaido, Japan

== Ships and boats ==
- S 30 (keelboat), a sailboat class
- Brazilian submarine Tupi (S-30)
- HMS Vigilant (S30), a submarine of the Royal Navy
- USS S-30 (SS-135), a submarine of the United States Navy

== Roads ==
- County Route S30 (California)
- County Route S30 (Bergen County, New Jersey)

== Other uses ==
- 40S ribosomal protein S30
- S30: Never add water to this product, a safety phrase in chemistry
- Sulfur-30, an isotope of sulfur
- S-30 rocket engine
