= 1907 in aviation =

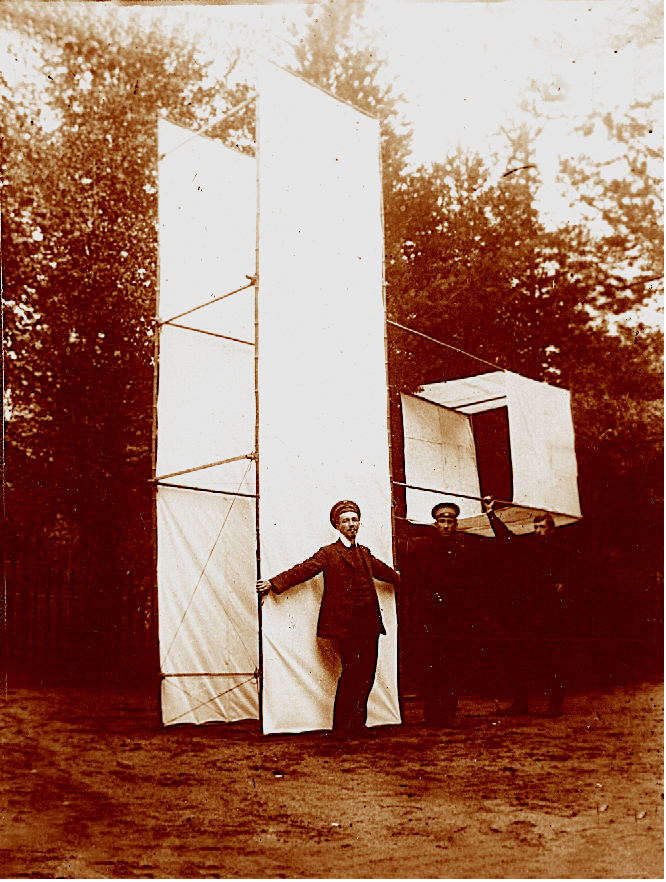
Sergey Vladimirovich Muratov testing a kite he constructed. The kite would successfully be used to tow a boat.

This is a list of aviation-related events from 1907:

== Events ==
- Work begins on the Gnome rotary engine.

=== January–December ===
- 30 March – Brothers Gabriel and Charles Voisin announce the successful test flight of the Voisin company's first airplane, the Voisin 1907 biplane.
- 5 April – Louis Blériot makes a short flight in his Blériot V monoplane.
- 6 April – Horatio Phillips achieves the first, limited, powered heavier-than-air flight in the United Kingdom when his multiplane makes a 500 ft (150 m) hop.
- July - The first aerodrome with hangars opens at Issy-les-Moulineaux, France.
- 1 August – The United States Army creates an Aeronautical Division within the office of the chief of its Signal Corps under Captain Charles deForest Chandler, consisting of one officer, one non-commissioned officer, and one enlisted man, with a mission to oversee "all matters pertaining to military ballooning, air machines, and all kindred subjects". It is the world's first heavier-than-air military aviation unit.
- 24 August – Ben Franklin, the largest balloon ever constructed at the time – with a capacity of 92,000 cubic feet (2,605 cubic meters) and capable of carrying 3,200 pounds (1,452 kg), including up to 12 passengers – makes its maiden flight, a meandering trip of 160 miles (258 km) from Philadelphia, Pennsylvania, to a field near New Egypt, New Jersey, in six hours with seven people on board.
- September - The Zeppelin LZ 3 sets a record by remaining aloft for eight hours.
- 29 September – Louis Breguet and Charles Richet demonstrate their Gyroplane No. 1, the first rotary-wing aircraft to lift a person off the ground. The craft does not fly freely; it is controlled by handlers with poles standing around it on the ground.
- 30 September – Flying a Voisin-Farman I biplane at Issy-les-Moulineaux, France, Henri Farman begins a progressively longer series of flights.
- 1 October – The Imperial German Army purchases its first dirigible from Luftschiffbau Zeppelin.
- 5 October – British Army Dirigible No 1, Nulli Secundus, the United Kingdom's first powered airship, makes her first long-distance flight, flying 50 miles (80 km) from the School of Ballooning, Farnborough, Hampshire, to London in 3 hours 25 minutes, circling the dome of St. Paul's Cathedral after arriving over London. Unable to make a planned return to Farnborough due to unfavorable winds, she is moored at the Crystal Palace.
- 10 October – Nulli Secundus is buffeted by high winds while moored at the Crystal Palace in London. Damaged during deflation, she will be partially dismantled and rebuilt as Nulli Secundus II.
- 12–13 October – Augustus Gaudron crosses the North Sea in a hot air balloon named Mammouth. He flies 1,160 km (720 mi) from the Crystal Palace, London to Vänern, Sweden.
- 19 October – Robert Esnault-Pelterie becomes the first pilot to fly using a control stick, at Buc, France.
- 24 October – Nine balloons take part in the second Gordon Bennett Cup international balloon race, departing from St. Louis, Missouri. The German balloon Pommern, piloted by Oscar Erbslohen and his assistant H. H. Clayton takes first place, covering a straight-line distance of 876.750 miles (1,411.836 km) to Asbury Park, New Jersey; the French balloon L'Ile de France takes second place; the German balloon Düsseldorf places third, 70.75 miles (113.93 km) behind L'Ile de France; and the American balloons St. Louis and America place fourth and fifth, respectively.
- 26 October – Henri Farman sets a world powered heavier-than-air distance record of 771 meters (2,530 ft).
- 10 November
  - Louis Blériot flies his Blériot VII monoplane, the ancestor of modern tractor monoplanes.
  - Henri Farman becomes the first European to be airborne in a powered heavier-than-air machine for longer than Wilbur Wright's 59-second flight of 17 December 1903 when he flies for 1 minute 14 seconds. He covers a distance of 1030 meters (3,379 feet).
- 13 November – Paul Cornu makes the first piloted vertical take-off in a rotary-wing aircraft at Lisieux, France. The aircraft lifts off several times but proves uncontrollable, remaining airborne only a few seconds each time, and is steadied with poles so that its flights do not qualify as wholly free flights. The best flight lifts Cornu about 30 cm (1 ft.) and lasts 20 seconds.
- 30 November
  - The French semi-rigid airship La Patrie breaks loose from her moorings at Souhesmes, France, with no one aboard and is swept northwest across France, England, and Ireland before disappearing over the North Atlantic Ocean.
  - Glenn Curtiss founds the Curtiss Aeroplane and Motor Company, the first airplane manufacturing company in the United States.
- 23 December – The United States Army's Aeronautical Division releases the world's first specification for a military aircraft issued for commercial tender. The specification calls for an aircraft capable of carrying two passengers with a combined weight of at least 350 lbs (159 kg), with a top speed of at least 40 mph (64 km/h) and a range of at least 125 statute miles (201 km).

== First flights ==
=== January–June ===
- 30 March – Voisin 1907 biplane, this first example is also known as the Delagrange No.1 after its owner, Léon Delagrange.
- 5 April – Bleriot V

=== July–November ===
- 11 July – Blériot VI Libellule.
- 10 September – Nulli Secundus, the British Army's first airship.
- 10 November – Blériot VII.

=== December ===
- 6 December – First manned flight of the AEA Cygnet tethered glider (also referred to as a kite) designed by Alexander Graham Bell. The flight is also the first flight for Thomas Selfridge, later killed in the crash of a powered aircraft.
- 17 December – Santos-Dumont Demoiselle (No 19).

== Births ==
- 30 May – Elly Beinhorn, German aviator (d. 2007)
