= S34 =

S34 may refer to:

== Aviation ==
- Blériot-SPAD S.34, a French biplane
- Plains Airport, in Sanders County, Montana, United States
- Sikorsky S-34, an American sesquiplane
- Skyfly S-34 Skystar, a Swiss ultralight

== Naval vessels ==
- Brazilian submarine Tikuna (S34)
- SMS S34 (1914), a torpedo boat of the Imperial German Navy
- Spanish submarine Cosme García (S34)
- USS S-34 (SS-139), a submarine of the United States Navy

== Other uses ==
- County Route S34 (California)
- Sulfur-34, an isotope of sulfur
