= Blériot-SPAD S.81 =

S.81

General information
- Type: Fighter
- Manufacturer: Blériot
- Designer: André Herbemont
- Primary user: French Air Force
- Number built: ca. 85

History
- First flight: 13 March 1923

The Blériot-SPAD S.81 (S.81 C.1) was a French fighter aircraft developed in 1923 to a requirement by the French Air Force. It was flown competitively against the Dewoitine D.1 and was selected over that aircraft due to the Dewoitine's more radical design, leading to an order for 80 aircraft. The S.81 was a single-bay biplane of conventional configuration with I-shaped interplane struts and lacking Herbemont's usual swept upper wing. It featured a wooden fuselage of monocoque construction and metal wings skinned in fabric. Production versions differed from the prototypes in having a lengthened fuselage and larger tail fin.

== Variants ==
S.81.01
two prototypes, powered by a 220 kW (300 hp) Hispano-Suiza 8Fb V-8 engine. The second aircraft was used for static tests only

S.81/1
production version, powered by a 220 kW (300 hp) Hispano-Suiza 8Fb V-8 engines, designated S.81 C.1 (S.81 Chasseur - single-seater) in air force service.

S.81bis
single example of racer version developed for the Coupe Michelin race. Performance poor.

S.81/2
single machine to evaluate alternative radiator design.

S.81/3
single machine to evaluate alternative radiator design

S.81/4
single machine to evaluate wooden wing design

S.81/6
racer converted from the S.81-bis

== Operators ==
France

- French Air Force
  - 2ème Fighter Regiment

== Specifications (S.81/1) ==
Data from Jane's all the World's Aircraft 1924, Aviafrance:SPAD S-81

General characteristics

- Crew: 1
- Length: 6.4 m (21 ft 0 in)
- Upper wingspan: 9.62 m (31 ft 7 in)
- Lower wingspan: 8.96 m (29 ft 5 in)
- Height: 2.8 m (9 ft 2 in)
- Wing area: 30 m^{2} (320 sq ft)
- Empty weight: 800 kg (1,764 lb)
- Gross weight: 1,250 kg (2,756 lb)
- Powerplant: 1 × Hispano-Suiza 8Fb V-8 water-cooled piston engine, 220 kW (300 hp)
- Propellers: 2-bladed fixed pitch wooden propeller

Performance

- Maximum speed: 250 km/h (160 mph, 130 kn) at sea level
- Range: 750 km (470 mi, 400 nmi)
- Service ceiling: 8,000 m (26,000 ft)
- Rate of climb: 6 m/s (1,200 ft/min)
- Wing loading: 41.6 kg/m^{2} (8.5 lb/sq ft)
- Power/mass: 0.1787 kW/kg (0.1087 hp/lb)

Armament

- Guns: 2 × fixed, forward-firing 7.7 mm (0.303 in) Vickers machine-guns

== See also ==
Related lists

- List of Interwar military aircraft

== Bibliography ==
- Bruner, Georges (1977). "Fighters a la Francaise, Part One". Air Enthusiast (3): 85–95. ISSN 0143-5450.
