= Blériot 106 =

General information
- Type: Cabin monoplane
- National origin: France
- Manufacturer: Blériot Aéronautique
- Number built: 1

History
- First flight: 15 July 1924

The Blériot 106 was a 1920s French cabin monoplane designed and built by Blériot Aéronautique. First flown on 15 July 1924 the 106 was a single-engined shoulder-wing monoplane powered by a 480 hp (358 kW) Renault 12Jb inline piston engine. The pilot sat in an open cockpit behind the engine and an enclosed cabin had room for six passengers.

== Specifications ==
Data from The Illustrated Encyclopedia of Aircraft

General characteristics

- Crew: 1
- Capacity: 6 passengers
- Length: 12.20 m (40 ft 0 in)
- Wingspan: 18.00 m (59 ft 1 in)
- Height: 3.50 m (11 ft 6 in)
- Max takeoff weight: 2,700 kg (5,952 lb)
- Powerplant: 1 × Renault 12Jb inline piston, 360 kW (480 hp)

Performance

- Maximum speed: 180 km/h (110 mph, 97 kn)
