= Blériot IX =

Unflyable early French aircraft

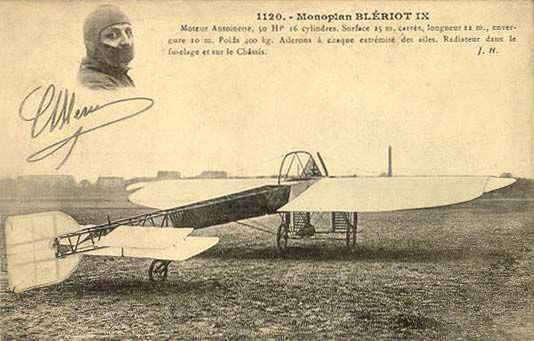

General information
- Type: Experimental aircraft
- Manufacturer: Louis Blériot
- Number built: 1

History
- First flight: 1908

The Blériot IX was an unsuccessful early French aeroplane built by Louis Blériot. Encouraged by the ever-increasing altitude, distance, and duration of flights with the Blériot VIII in 1908, he built a new machine along the same general lines, but heavier and with a more powerful engine. The Blériot IX was exhibited at the Paris Motor Show in December 1908, but the design proved overweight and could not be made to leave the ground.

== Development ==
The aircraft was a wire-braced mid-winged monoplane with conventional landing gear and an open cockpit. The aircraft used two large vertically mounted steam radiators on each side. A unique feature for the time was an all-metal ground-adjustable four-blade propeller installation.

== Specifications ==
General characteristics

- Crew: one pilot
- Length: 12.00 m (39 ft 4 in)
- Wingspan: 9.00 m (29 ft 6 in)
- Wing area: 25 m^{2} (269 sq ft)
- Gross weight: 450 kg (990 lb)
- Powerplant: 1 × Antoinette 16V , 48 kW (65 hp)
