= Blériot XXV =

1910s French aircraft

General information
- Type: Observation aircraft
- National origin: France
- Manufacturer: Recherches Aéronautique Louis Blériot
- Number built: 1

History
- First flight: 1911

The Bleriot XXV was a single-seat, high-wing, pusher-type canard monoplane designed by Louis Bleriot. Only one aircraft was built.

== Specifications ==
Data from

General characteristics

- Crew: 1
- Length: 5.50 m (18 ft 1 in)
- Wingspan: 8.90 m (29 ft 2 in)
- Wing area: 12 m^{2} (130 sq ft)
- Empty weight: 400 kg (882 lb)
- Powerplant: 1 × Gnome 7 Omega 7-cylinder air-cooled rotary piston engine, 37 kW (50 hp)
- Propellers: 2-bladed
