= Samsung M800 Instinct =

Smartphone by Samsung

Samsung M800 (Instinct)
- Manufacturer: Samsung Electronics
- Availability by region: June 20, 2008
- Successor: Samsung Instinct s30
- Form factor: Slate
- Dimensions: 11.61×5.51×1.24 cm (4.57×2.17×0.49 in)
- Weight: 4.4 oz (127.4 g)
- Removable storage: 2 GB MicroSD (included)
- Battery: Lithium-ion polymer battery with 2nd battery included
- Rear camera: 2.0 megapixel
- Display: 240 x 432 px, 3.1" LCD
- Connectivity: Dock connector, Headphone jack, Bluetooth 2.0+EDR
- Data inputs: Haptic touchscreen

The Samsung Instinct (SPH-M800) was an Internet-enabled smartphone designed and marketed by Samsung Mobile. It uses a Haptic touchscreen interface, and three touchscreen buttons (pictured at right, from left to right - [back], [home], [phone]). The Instinct, in addition to being a mobile phone, also functions as a camera phone, portable media player, text messenger, and a complete web browser and e-mail client. The email client allows for access to only the main inbox of any associated account – not to any subfolder. The folders for "drafts", "sent", "deleted", and "outbox" represent only messages originating from the phone.

The MP3 player allows users to listen to music while they exchange text messages. It pauses music when the user answers a call. The Instinct supports uploading music into the music library. The phone does not come with MP3 ringtones.

The Instinct was initially available only in the United States through Sprint. It was announced in early July 2008 that the Instinct would be available in Canada from Bell Mobility, starting on August 8, 2008 and from Telus Mobility on August 19, 2008. It became the second fastest selling phone in Sprint's history (the first being the Palm Pre).

== Specifications ==
The specifications as listed on the Samsung Instinct website are:

- Screen size: 7.87 cm (3.1 in)
- Screen resolution: 432×240 pixels
- Input method: Haptic touch-screen interface
- Storage: 2GB MicroSD Card (Also supports higher-quality MicroSDHC cards) (Officially upgradeable to an 8GB card, but according to the posters at www.instinct-samsung.com , any software restrictions preventing the Instinct from reading cards of greater capacity could be fixed by a simple firmware update, distributed by the cellular service provider, i.e. Sprint [in the U.S.], or Bell or Telus [in Canada]), at this time however no update has been released.
- Network: CDMA EV-DO Rev A (800 MHz/1900 MHz) (Comparable to better-known 3G)
- 1,000mAh Li-ion battery, capable of 5.75 hours of continuous talk time; third-party extended batteries (up to capacities of 1880 mAh) are available.
- Size: 11.61×5.51×1.24 cm (4.57"×2.17"×0.48" in)
- Weight: 124.74 g (4.4 oz)
- Applications
  - Video recording and streaming (MPEG-4 AVC) (Note: streaming and/or playback may be limited/disabled in Canadian versions.)
  - Personal organizer
  - 2 megapixel camera (max resolution 1600 x 1200 pixels)
  - Web browser (WAP 2.0, XHTML, HTML, WML, WMLS). The Instinct has the ability to run the popular mobile browser Opera Mini (version 4.2 is currently the most cooperative), while performing very well compared to the default web browser.
  - Swappable 2nd battery with separate charging case included in US package.
  - Sprint Navigation available in US package, depending on cellular plan.
  - Demos for Bejeweled, Brain Challenge, EA Sudoku, Midnight Bowling, Million Dollar Poker, NASCAR Sprint Cup Series, Pac-Man Plus, and Scene It? Movies.

== Sprint advertising against Apple iPhone ==
When Samsung first introduced the Instinct, its marketing campaign imitated some methods that were employed by Apple. One of these was using side-by-side comparisons in a teaser website for Instinct, presenting a breakdown of all features that were superior to, insufficient, or wholly missing in what was then the first-generation iPhone (as listed byTG Daily) —

- Loading a web page much faster;
- Exact geographical positioning with built-in GPS;
- Downloading songs wirelessly through the mobile network of the carrier;
- Possibility to watch live television;
- Recording and sending video.

Samsung also had a fictional film trailer produced, featuring the device in a clip fashioned after Hollywood blockbusters.

The ad campaign utilized negative language with the words "kill" and "defeat" toward the iPhone. The campaign was criticized by TG Daily as "bad marketing," specifically for negative language and pitting the Instinct directly against the iPhone, thereby offering Apple's product additional exposure.

At the time, the iPhone 3G was known to be less than two weeks away from being introduced, with the launch date for Instinct set to 20 June 2008, the day the new iPhone was speculated to be released. The iPhone 3G was subsequently released the following month, on 11 July 2008.
