= Blériot VI =

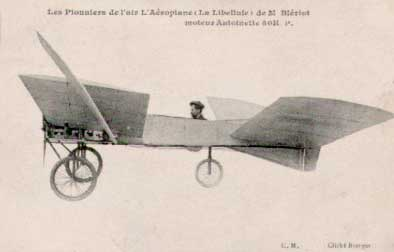

General information
- Type: Experimental tandem wing aircraft
- Manufacturer: Louis Blériot
- Number built: 1

History
- First flight: 11 July 1907

The Blériot VI "Libellule" ("Dragonfly"), was built in 1907 and was one of the series of experimental aircraft built by Louis Blériot which eventually led to the Blériot XI aircraft in which he made the first flight across the English Channel.

== Design and development ==
Abandoning the canard layout of the Blériot V, Blériot and his chief engineer Louis Peyret next built a tandem wing configuration aircraft, possibly influenced by the Langley Aerodrome. In its initial form the aircraft had two pairs of identical wings rigged with pronounced dihedral mounted on the lower longerons at each end of the wooden box-girder fuselage, with small tip -mounted elevators on the front wings. Triangular fins were mounted above and below the rear fuselage, with a small rudder hinged to their trailing edge. The undercarriage consisted of a pair of wheels on V-struts at the front of the aircraft and a third wheel mounted slightly behind the midpoint of the fuselage. It was powered by a 24 hp (18 kW) Antoinette V-8 engine.

First trials were made at Issy-les-Moulineaux on 7 July but the aircraft failed to lift off. Blériot then enlarged the wings slightly, and on 11 July a short successful flight of around 25–30 metres (84–100 ft) was made, reaching an altitude of around 2 m (7 ft). Because some onlookers were in the way Blériot then shut off the engine and landed. Although the achievement was marred by slight damage to the undercarriage, this was Blériot's first truly successful flight. Further successful flights took place that month, and by 25 July he had managed a flight of 150 m (490 ft). During these flights Blériot made various modifications: he locked the wingtip ailerons and installed a sliding seat, so that he could maintain longitudinal trim by shifting the aircraft's centre of gravity, and extended the vertical tail surface. On 6 August he managed to reach an altitude of 12 m (39 ft), but one of the blades of the propeller worked loose, resulting in a heavy landing which damaged the aircraft. He then fitted a 50 hp (37 kW) V-16 Antoinette engine. Tests on the 17 September showed a startling improvement in performance, with the aircraft quickly reaching an altitude of 25 m (82 ft), when the engine suddenly cut out and the aircraft went into a spiralling nosedive. Blériot later said that his immediate thought was that he was finished: in desperation he climbed out of his seat and threw himself towards the tail. The aircraft partially pulled out of the dive, and came to earth in a more or less horizontal attitude. His only injuries were some minor cuts on the face, caused by fragments of glass from his broken goggles. After this crash Blériot abandoned development of the aircraft, concentrating on his next machine, the Type VII.

This event was witnessed by a large proportion of the French aviation community, including Robert Esnault-Pelterie, Ferdinand Ferber and the Voisin brothers: also among the spectators was Blériot's wife Alice, who had come to watch one of her husband's flights for the first time. Esnault Pelterie paced out the length of the flight, measuring it at 184 m (604 ft). This made it the longest flight achieved in France that year to date, and although the flight had not been officially witnessed, Blériot was awarded a special medal by the Aero Club de France for the feat.

== Specifications (VI-bis) ==
General characteristics

- Crew: 1
- Length: 7.00 m (23 ft 0 in)
- Wingspan: 7.20 m (23 ft 7 in)
- Wing area: 20 m^{2} (215 sq ft)
- Powerplant: 1 × Antoinette V-16 , 74.6 kW (100 hp)

== Bibliography ==
- Devaux, Jean and Michel Marani. "Les Douze Premiers Aéroplanes de Louis Blériot". Pegase No 54, May 1989.
- Elliott, Bryan A. Blériot: Herald of an Age. Stroud: Tempus, 2000. ISBN 0-7524-1739-8
- Taylor, Michael J. H. Jane's Encyclopedia of Aviation. London: Studio Editions, 1989 p. 161
- Nova: A Daring Flight
