= Blériot 105 =

1920s French aircraft

General information
- Type: Cabin monoplane
- National origin: France
- Manufacturer: Blériot Aéronautique
- Number built: 1

History
- First flight: 4 August 1924
- Developed from: Bleriot-SPAD S.45

The Bleriot 105 was a biplane passenger aircraft built by Louis Bleriot in the mid-1920s, derived from the SPAD S-45.

== Specifications ==
Data from

General characteristics

- Crew: 1
- Capacity: 18 passengers
- Length: 15.69 m (51 ft 6 in)
- Wingspan: 26.84 m (88 ft 1 in)
- Height: 5.95 m (19 ft 6 in)
- Wing area: 125.00 m^{2} (1,345.5 sq ft)
- Empty weight: 3,000 kg (6,614 lb)
- Gross weight: 5,500 kg (12,125 lb)
- Powerplant: 4 × Hispano-Suiza 8Fb V-8 inline piston, 220 kW (300 hp) each

Performance

- Maximum speed: 154 km/h (96 mph, 83 kn)
- Service ceiling: 2,900 m (9,500 ft)
