= Blériot 118 =

General information
- Type: Two-seat amphibian flying-boat fighter
- National origin: France
- Manufacturer: Blériot
- Designer: Léon Kirste
- Number built: 1

History
- First flight: 23 January 1925

The Blériot 118 was a 1920s French amphibian flying-boat fighter designed by Léon Kirste, only one was built and it was not ordered into production.

== Design and development ==
The 118 was developed by Kirste from his earlier Blériot 101 project to meet a French naval requirement for a two-seat fighter. The 118 was an amphibian flying-boat powered by two Hispano-Suiza 8Ab piston engines. First flown on 23 January 1925 it was tested by the Navy in competition with other designs but was rejected for being unstable in flight.

== Specifications ==
Data from The Illustrated Encyclopedia of Aircraft

General characteristics

- Crew: 2
- Length: 8.81 m (28 ft 10.75 in)
- Wingspan: 12.90 m (42 ft 3.75 in)
- Height: 2.80 m (9 ft 2.25 in)
- Gross weight: 1,740 kg (3,836 lb)
- Powerplant: 2 × Hispano-Suiza 8Ab inline piston engine , 134 kW (180 hp) each

Performance

- Maximum speed: 200 km/h (124 mph, 108 kn)

Armament

- Proposed - two fixed forward firing 7.7mm (0.303in) machine-guns
- Proposed - two ring-mounted 7.7mm (0.303in) machine-guns on rear-cockpit

== See also ==
Related lists

- List of flying boats and floatplanes
