= Blériot XXVII =

1910s French aircraft

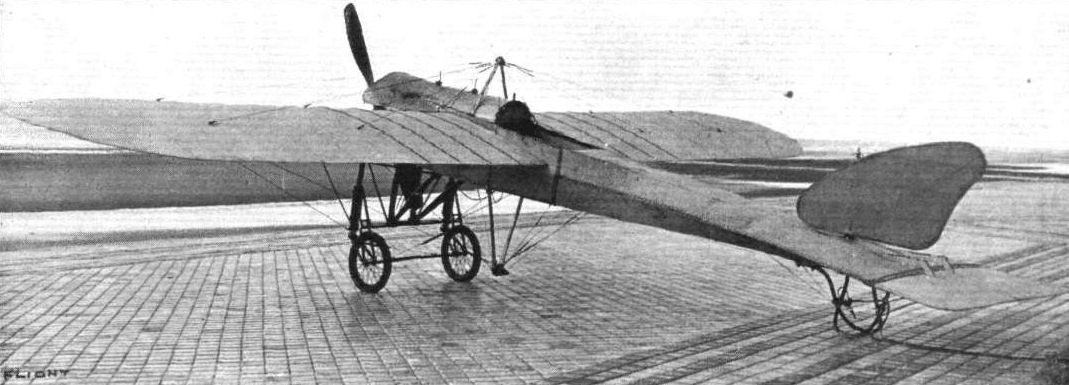

General information
- Type: Racer aircraft
- National origin: France
- Manufacturer: Recherches Aéronautique Louis Blériot
- Number built: 1

History
- First flight: September 1911

The Bleriot XXVII was a middle-wing, single-seat racing aircraft designed by Louis Bleriot.

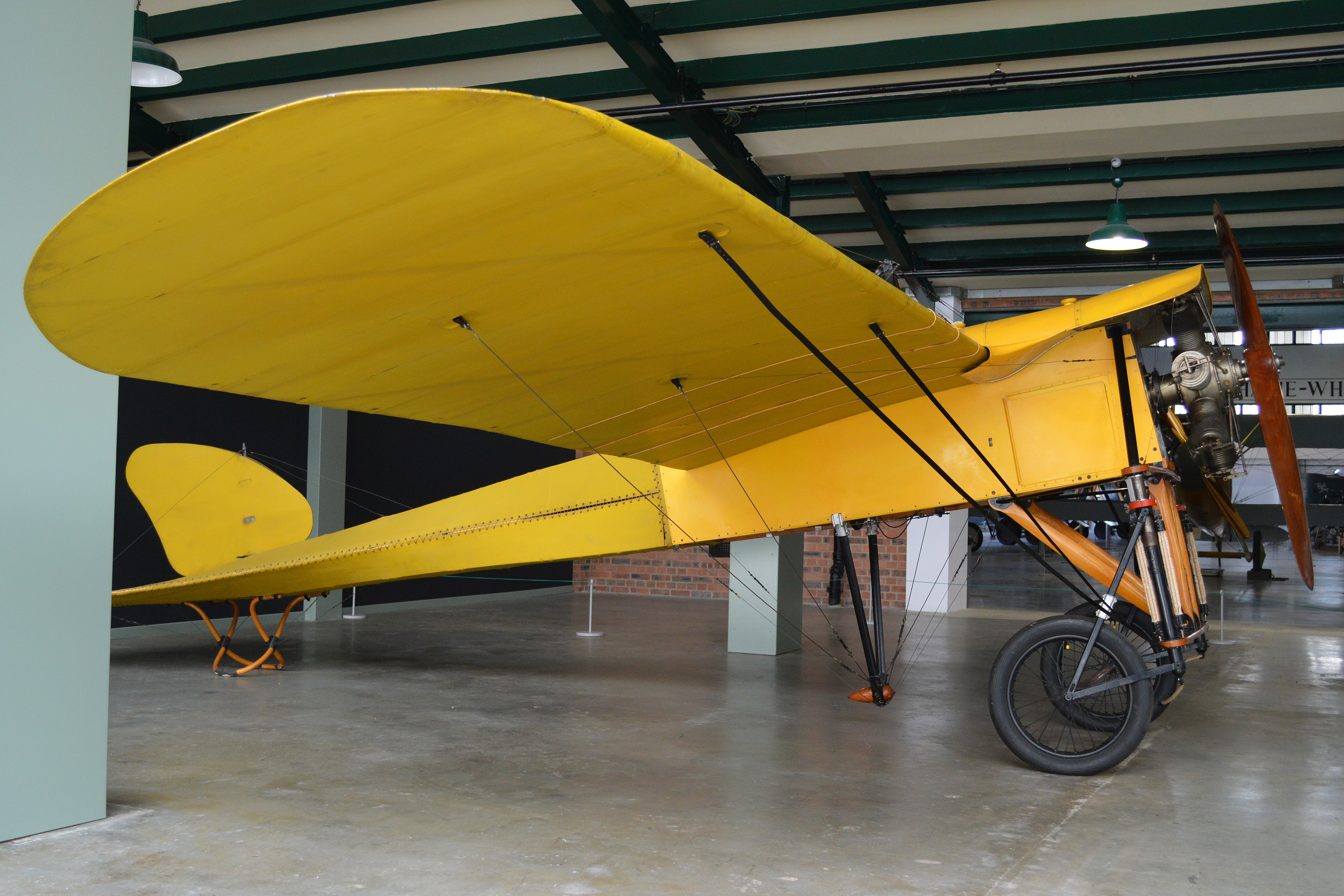
Blériot XXVII BAPC-107 at the RAF Museum Hendon

== Specifications ==
Data from

General characteristics

- Crew: 1
- Length: 7.50 m (24 ft 7 in)
- Wingspan: 8.90 m (29 ft 2 in)
- Wing area: 12 m^{2} (130 sq ft)
- Gross weight: 430 kg (948 lb)
- Powerplant: 1 × Gnome 7 Omega 7-cylinder air-cooled rotary piston engine, 37 kW (50 hp)
- Propellers: 2-bladed
- Maximum speed: 125 km/h (78 mph, 67 kn)
