= Blériot XXXIII Canard Bleu =

1910s French aircraft

General information
- Type: Tourism aircraft
- National origin: France
- Manufacturer: Recherches Aéronautique Louis Blériot
- Number built: 1

History
- First flight: 1912

The Blériot XXXIII Canard Bleu was a middle-wing, two-seat tourism aircraft designed by Louis Bleriot. It had a canard configuration.

== Specifications ==
Data from

General characteristics

- Crew: 2
- Length: 8.00 m (26 ft 3 in)
- Wingspan: 10.50 m (34 ft 5 in)
- Wing area: 24 m^{2} (260 sq ft)
- Gross weight: 330 kg (728 lb)
- Powerplant: 1 × Gnome 7 Gamma 7-cylinder air-cooled rotary piston engine, 52 kW (70 hp)
- Propellers: 2-bladed
- Maximum speed: 115 km/h (71 mph, 62 kn)
