= Blériot 195 =

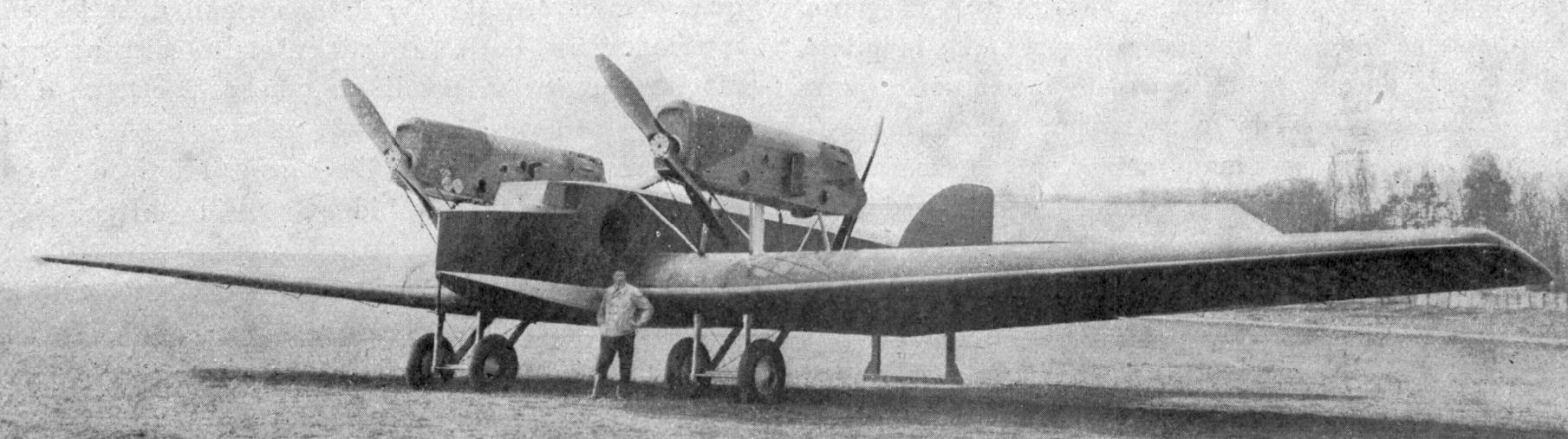

General information
- Type: Long-range mail plane
- National origin: France
- Manufacturer: Blériot Aéronautique
- Number built: 1

History
- First flight: 9 March 1929

The Blériot 195 was a French monoplane mail-carrier designed and built by Blériot Aéronautique, the one aircraft built was modified a number of times but failed to enter production.

== Design and development ==
The Blériot 195 was a large low-wing cantilever monoplane designed for use on mail flights across the North Atlantic. It was powered by four 100 hp (75 kW) Hispano-Suiza 6Mb inline piston engines, which were mounted in tandem pairs above the wing on a complex of struts. Designated the 195/2 landplane, it first flew on 9 March 1929. By the end of 1929, it had been re-designated the 195/3 and test flown with twin floats. It was re-designated again as the 195/4 in early 1930, when it was fitted with 230 hp (172 kW) Gnome-Rhone Titan engines. It was put forward to meet a requirement for a seaplane to operate a mail service between Marseilles and Algiers, but in the end none of the designs submitted were accepted and the 195 was placed into storage.

In April 1931 it was brought out of storage and modified to be a landplane and designated the 195/6; it was then tested by Air Union as a cargo aircraft. It did not gain a certificate of airworthiness as a cargo carrier and was withdrawn from use.

== Variants ==
195/2
Mail-carrier landplane with four 250hp Hispano-Suiza 6Mb piston engines.
195/3
The 195/2 modified as a floatplane.
195/4
The 195/3 re-engined with four 230hp Gnome-Rhône 5Kd Titan engines.
195/6
195/4 modified to a landplane.

== Specifications (195/2) ==
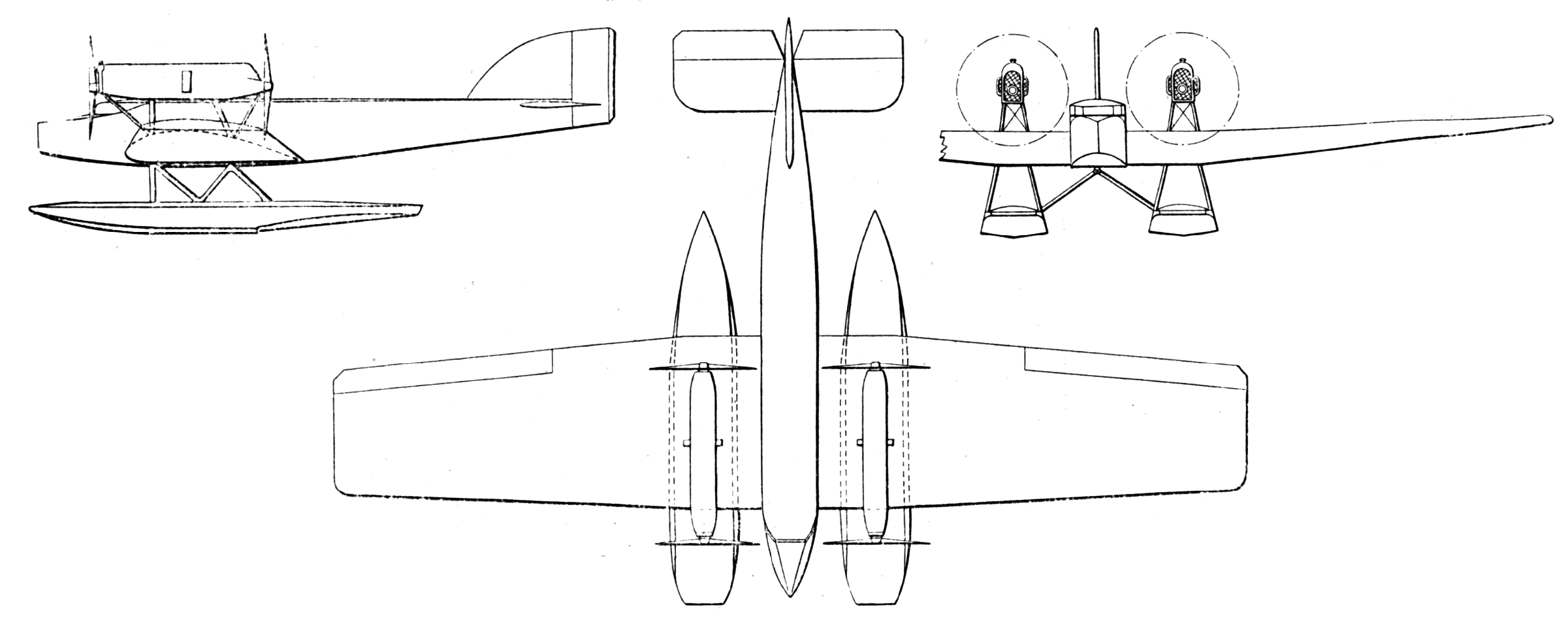
Blériot 195 3-view drawing from L'Aéronautique April, 1929

Data from The Illustrated Encyclopedia of Aircraft

General characteristics

- Length: 14.70 m (48 ft 2.75 in)
- Wingspan: 23.20 m (76 ft 1.25 in)
- Height: 4.10 m (13 ft 5.5 in)
- Wing area: 90.00 m^{2} (968.78 sq ft)
- Empty weight: 3,850 kg (8,488 lb)
- Gross weight: 5,750 kg (12,677 lb)
- Powerplant: 4 × Hispano-Suiza 6Mb inline piston engine , 186 kW (150 hp) each

Performance

- Maximum speed: 210 km/h (130 mph, 110 kn)
- Service ceiling: 4,000 m (13,125 ft)

== See also ==
Related lists

- List of flying boats and floatplanes
