= Blériot V =

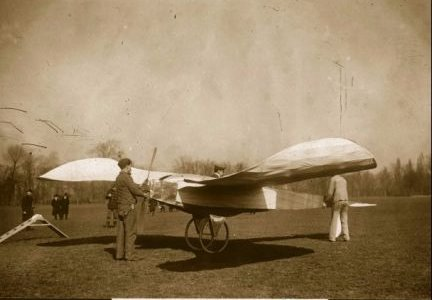

General information
- Type: Experimental monoplane
- Manufacturer: Louis Blériot
- Designer: Louis Blériot
- Number built: 1

History
- First flight: 5 April 1907
- Fate: destroyed

The Blériot V was an early French aircraft built by Louis Blériot in 1907 and was his first monoplane. Although Blériot only achieved a couple of short flights in it, the second resulting in a crash which damaged the aircraft beyond repair, it was the first of his experimental aircraft to achieve any measure of success.

== Background ==
Louis Blériot had previously worked in partnership with Gabriel Voisin. These aircraft were not successful, and after the last of these machines, the Bleriot IV, had been damaged in an attempt to fly it in November 1906 the partnership was dissolved and Blériot set up Recherches Aéronautiques Louis Blériot to carry out his experiments with aircraft.

== Design and development ==
The Blériot V was a canard configuration pusher monoplane with a braced wooden box-girder fuselage covered with varnished silk, at the rear of which was the 24 hp (18 kW) Antoinette water-cooled V-8 engine.

The wings, which could be folded upwards for transport and had no wire bracing, were made of wood covered with varnished paper and were of a complex design probably inspired by the seeds of the Zanonia tree. Remarkably for the time, the high-set wings were cantilever structures. Though the 1907 plan view much exaggerates the curvature, the wing leading edges did form a quarter of a circle, with constant chord out to large, curved edged tips with increased chord and dihedral.

There was a small elevator mounted at the front of the fuselage as well as a rectangular rudder mounted underneath, which also served as a nose skid. The main undercarriage consisted of a pair of bicycle wheels on a short single axle mounted on struts from the fuselage under the wing.

It was first tried on 21 March 1907, when Blériot made a single taxiing trial which ended in the aircraft slewing round, causing the undercarriage to collapse and damaging the rudder and elevator. Two further ground trials were made, one on 26 March, causing similar damage, and another on 2 April, when the propeller was damaged. After this trial Blériot replaced the frontal rudder with a large, semi-circular one mounted on a frame reaching behind the propeller, and added a fin to the underside of the fuselage in front of the wing. He also added a third wheel, placed centrally and under the engine. On 5 April a further trial was made, and after a 100 m (305 ft) run the machine briefly left the ground. Concerned about his ability to control the aircraft in the stiff breeze that was blowing, Blériot cut the engine and landed, yet again damaging the undercarriage slightly. He had only flown around 6 m (20 ft), but nevertheless this was the first time one of his aircraft had successfully flown. More trials followed, the last on 19 April when, traveling at a speed of around 50 km/h (30 mph), the aircraft left the ground. Blériot over-responded when the nose began to rise and the machine hit the ground nose–first and somersaulted. It was largely destroyed and Blériot was fortunate to emerge unhurt.

== Specifications ==
Data from L'Aerophile, February 1907

General characteristics

- Crew: one pilot
- Length: 8.50 m (27 ft 11 in)
- Wingspan: 7.80 m (25 ft 7 in)
- Wing area: 13.0 m^{2} (140 sq ft)
- Gross weight: 260 kg (573 lb)
- Powerplant: 1 × Antoinette liquid-cooled V8 engine , 18 kW (24 hp)
