= Blériot-SPAD S.34 =

S.34
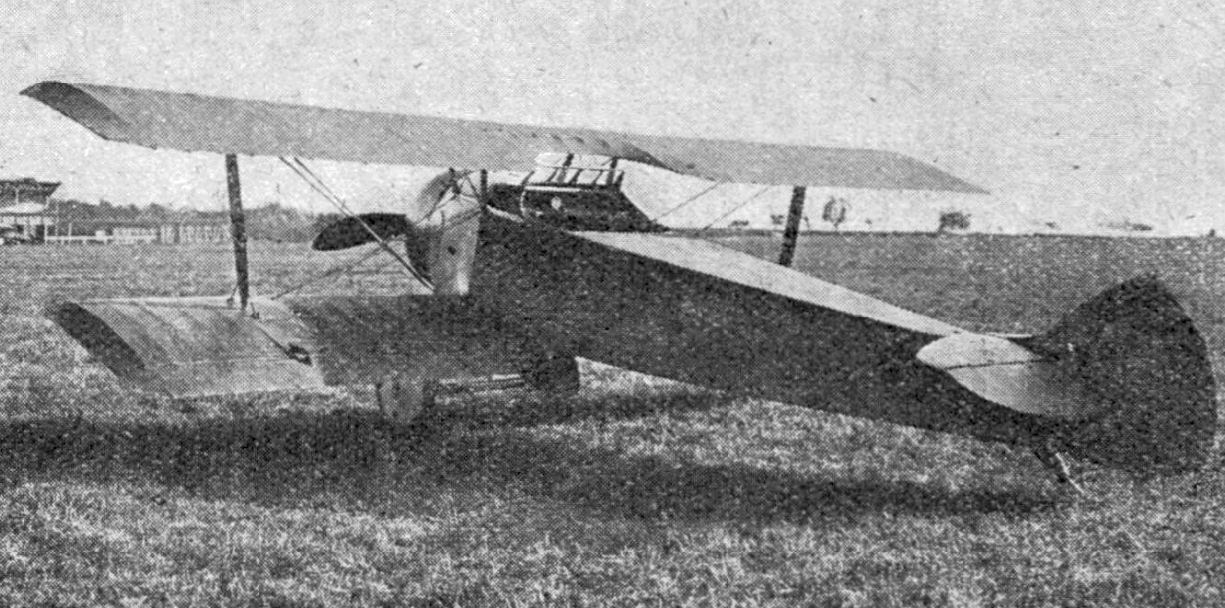

General information
- Type: Trainer aircraft
- Manufacturer: Blériot
- Designer: André Herbemont
- Primary users: French Air Force Finnish Air Force
- Number built: 150

History
- Introduction date: 1920
- First flight: 16 July 1920
- Retired: 1936

The Blériot-SPAD S.34 was a French twin-seat, single-engine biplane flight training aircraft designed in 1920. The side-by-side seating arrangement was unique for its time. 150 aircraft were built, 125 for the French Air Force, who used them until 1936.

The Finnish Air Force purchased two S.34s in 1921. Due to inadequate maintenance they did not last long and were withdrawn from service by 1925.

== Variants ==
Bleriot-SPAD S.34-1
First Bleriot-SPAD S.34 prototype.
Bleriot-SPAD S.34-2
Second Bleriot-SPAD S.34 prototype.
Bleriot-SPAD S.34-3
Third Bleriot-SPAD S.34 prototype.
Bleriot-SPAD S.34
Two-seat primary trainer biplane.
Bleriot-SPAD S.34 bis
Improved variant, powered by a 130-hp (97-kW) Clêrget 9B rotary piston engine. Three were built for the Aéronavale.

== Operators ==
France

- Aéronautique Militaire - (119 aircraft)
- Aéronavale - (6 S.34-bis aircraft)
- Blériot flying school - (16 aircraft)

Argentina

- (6 aircraft)

Finland

- Finnish Air Force - (2 aircraft)

Bolivia

- Bolivian Air Force (1 aircraft)

== Specification (S.34) ==
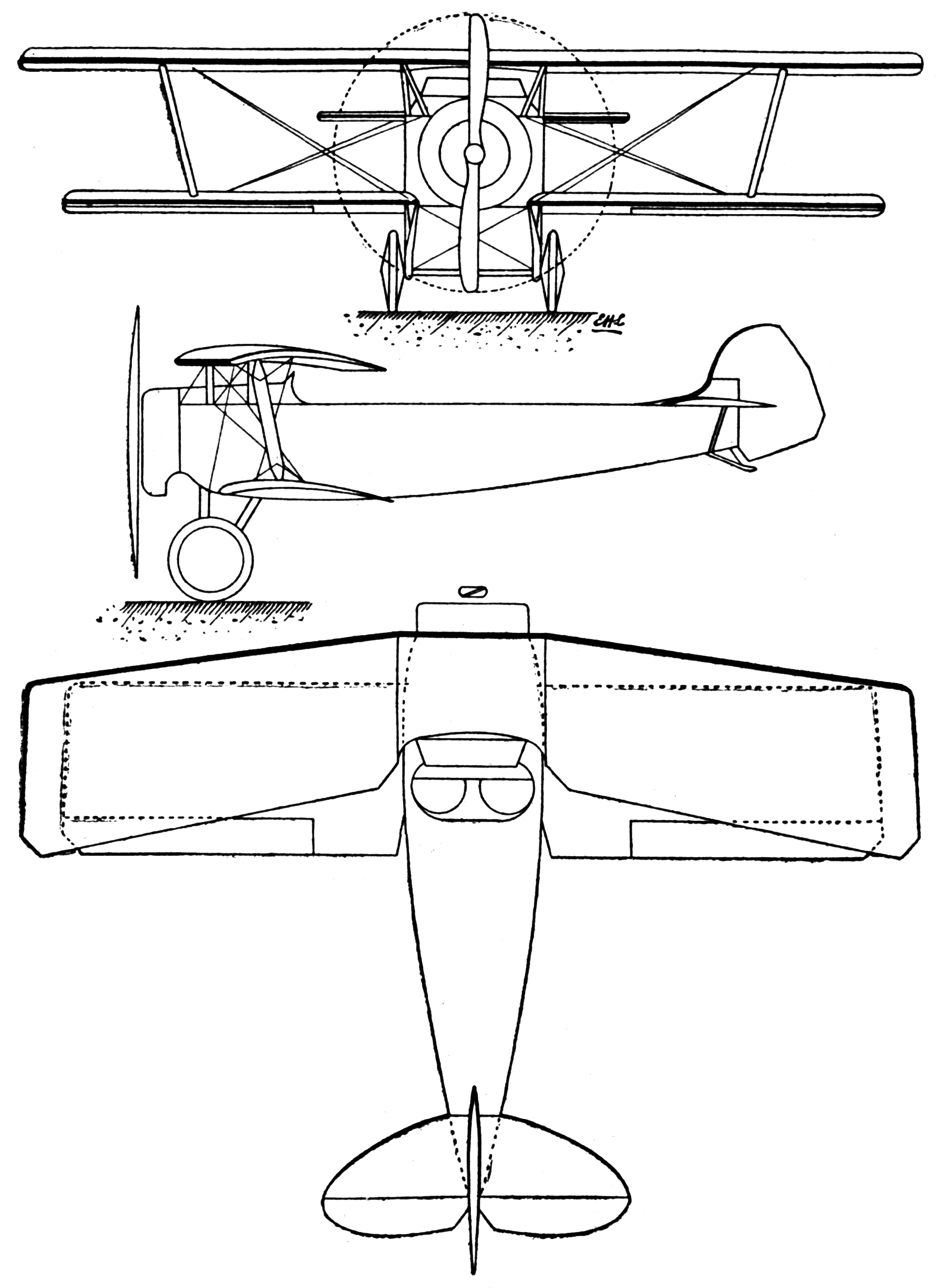
Blériot-SPAD S.34 3-view drawing from Les Ailes August 18, 1921

Data from Les Ailes, August 1921

General characteristics

- Crew: One instructor, one pupil
- Length: 6.50 m (21 ft 4 in)
- Upper wingspan: 8.12 m (26 ft 8 in)
- Lower wingspan: 7.40 m (24 ft 3 in)
- Height: 2.36 m (7 ft 9 in)
- Wing area: 21 m^{2} (230 sq ft)
- Airfoil: Albatrs RA.54
- Empty weight: 440 kg (970 lb)
- Gross weight: 690 kg (1,521 lb)
- Powerplant: 1 × Le Rhône 9C 9-cylinder rotary engine, 60 kW (80 hp)
- Propellers: 2-bladed

Performance

- Maximum speed: 136 km/h (85 mph, 73 kn)
- Service ceiling: 4,000 m (13,000 ft)
- Time to altitude: 17 min 7 s to 2,000 m (6,600 ft)
- Landing speed: 40 km/s (89,000 mph; 78,000 kn)
