= Samsung M810 Instinct S30 =

Cell phone model

Samsung SPH-M810 Instinct S30
- Manufacturer: Samsung Electronics
- Type: Feature phone
- Series: Instinct
- First released: April 19, 2009; 17 years ago (Sprint Nextel)
- Predecessor: Samsung Instinct
- Successor: Samsung Instinct Q (Samsung Moment) and Samsung Instinct HD
- Compatible networks: Dual band CDMA2000/EV-DO Rev. 0 800, 1900 MHz
- Form factor: Candybar
- Dimensions: 11.61×5.51×1.24 cm (4.57×2.17×0.49 in) (4.57" * 2.17" * 0.49")
- Weight: 3.88oz (110g)
- Operating system: Proprietary
- Storage: 32 MB
- Removable storage: 2 GB MicroSD (included)
- Battery: Lithium-ion polymer battery with 2nd battery not included
- Rear camera: 2.0 megapixel
- Display: 3.2 in (81 mm) diagonal LCD; 240 X 432 px 262K colors
- Connectivity: Dock connector, Wi-Fi (802.11b/g), headphone jack, Bluetooth 2.0+EDR A-GPS
- Data inputs: Haptic touchscreen

Samsung SPH-M810 (known as Instinct S30, previously as Instinct Mini) is an Internet-enabled cell phone designed and marketed by Samsung and carried by Sprint Nextel from 2009. It uses a Haptic touchscreen interface, and three touchscreen buttons (from left to right - [back], [home], and [phone]). The Instinct, in addition to being a mobile phone, also functions as a camera phone, portable media player, text messenger, and a complete web browser and e-mail client.
