= Blériot X =

X
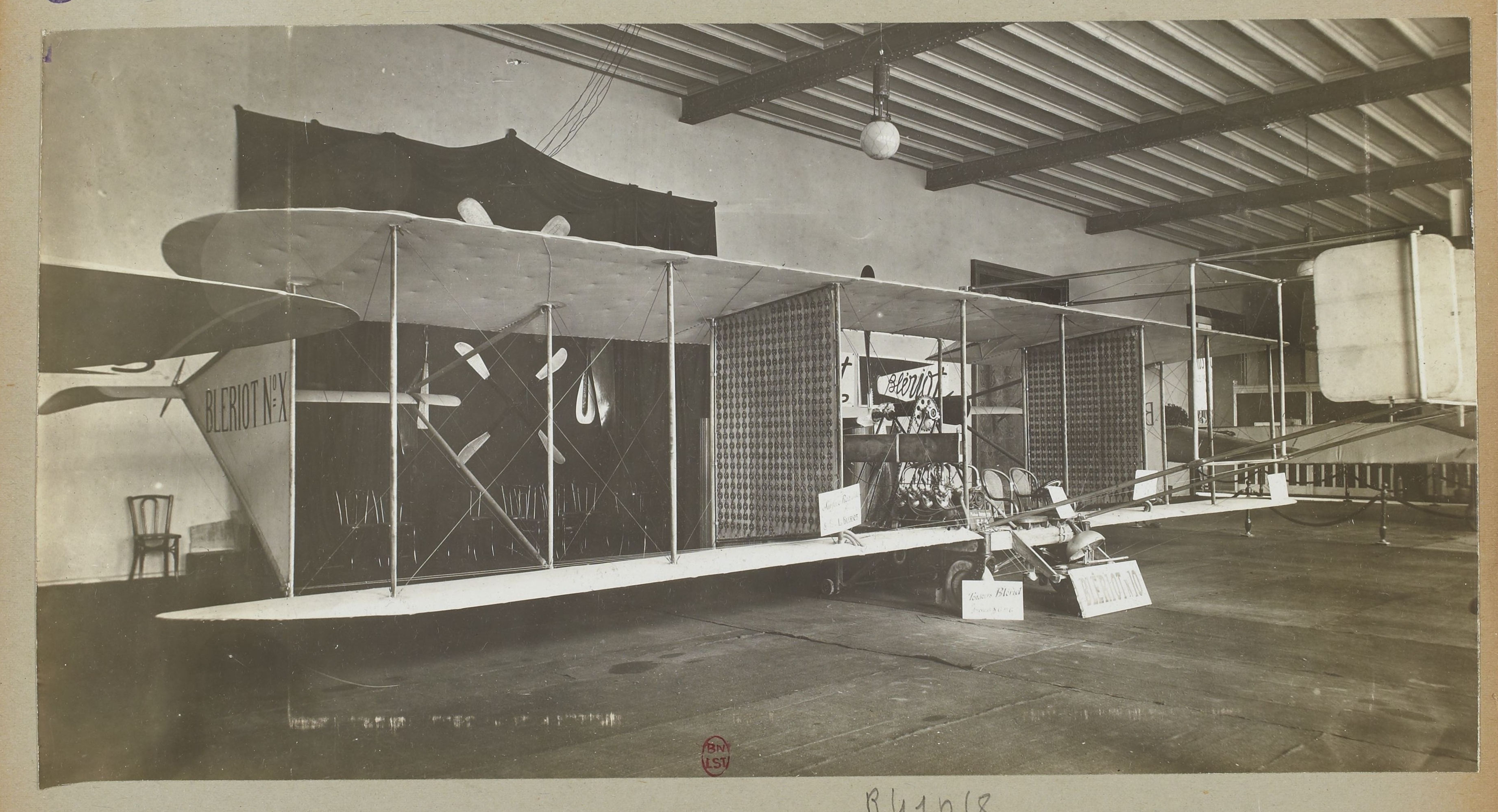
- The incomplete Blériot X at the 1908 Paris Salon de l'Automobile et de l'Aéronautique

General information
- Type: Experimental aircraft
- Manufacturer: Louis Blériot
- Status: never completed
- Number built: 1

The Blériot X was an unfinished early French aeroplane by Louis Blériot. Its design was quite unlike anything else he had built and was modelled closely on the successful aircraft of the Wright brothers: a pusher biplane with elevators and rudders carried on outriggers. After exhibiting it at the Salon de l'Automobile et de l'Aéronautique in Paris in December 1908, Bleriot abandoned it and returned to developing his increasingly successful monoplane designs.

== Specifications ==
General characteristics

- Crew: one pilot
- Capacity: 2 passengers
- Length: 8.00 m (26 ft 3 in)
- Wingspan: 12.00 m (39 ft 4 in)
- Wing area: 60 m^{2} (646 sq ft)
- Gross weight: 650 kg (1,430 lb)
- Powerplant: 1 × Antoinette 8V V-8 water-cooled piston engine , 37 kW (50 hp)
