= Blériot VIII =

French pioneer era aeroplane

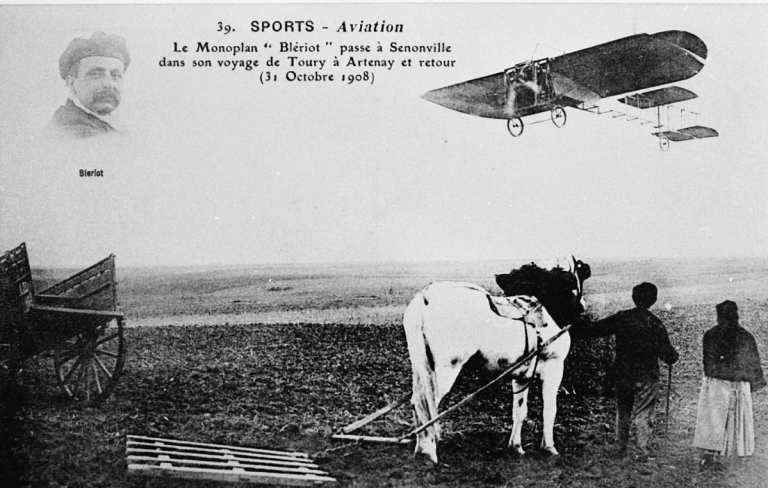

General information
- Type: Experimental aircraft
- Manufacturer: Louis Blériot
- Number built: 1

History
- First flight: 1908

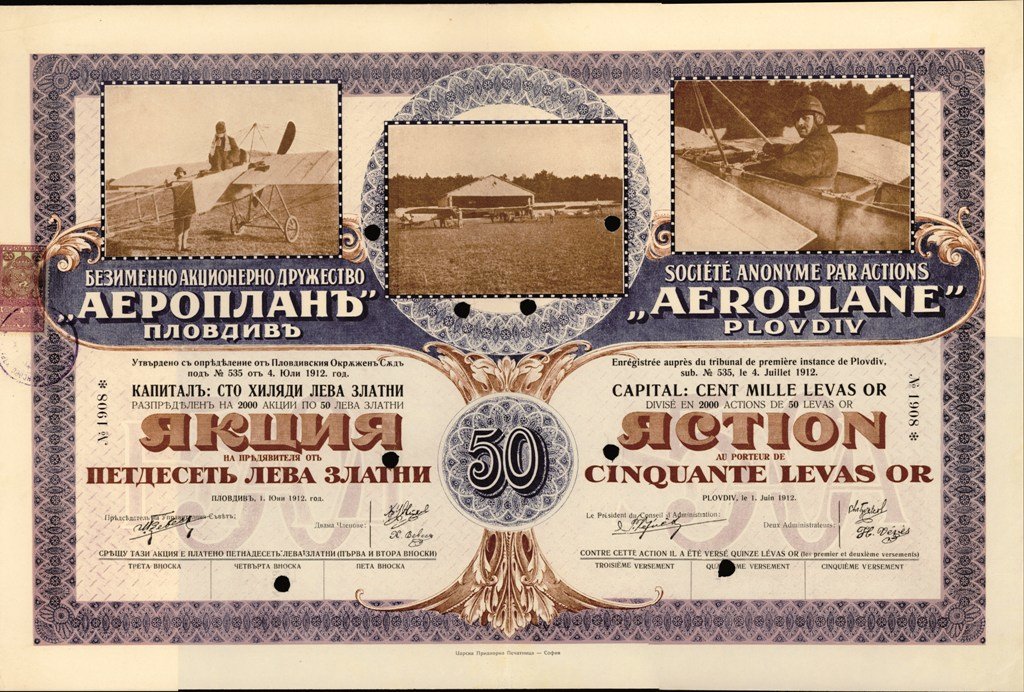
Vignettes of Louis Blériot and his "Blériot VIII" on a share of the S.A. par Actions "Aeroplane", issued 1. June 1912

The Blériot VIII was a French pioneer era aeroplane built by Louis Blériot, significant for its adoption of both a configuration and a control system that were to set a standard for decades to come.

== Design and development ==
The previous year, Blériot had experimented with a tandem wing design, the Blériot VI, then built another aircraft, the Blériot VII, in which the rear wing was somewhat smaller than the front wing, and introduced the later Type XI's "bedstead", shock-absorbing and castoring main landing gear design. In the Blériot VIII, he reduced the size of the rear wing yet again, to the point where it was no longer contributing much in the way of lift, but had become the horizontal stabiliser. More novel was his adoption of a single control stick that would control both roll and pitch, while the rudder was controlled by a horizontal, centrally pivoted bar swung by the pilot's feet. A similar control arrangement for roll and pitch control had been incorporated into an aircraft the previous year by Robert Esnault-Pelterie, but the Bleriot VIII was the first use in a single airframe of the combination of hand-operated joystick and foot-operated rudder control which is in use to the present day as the basic format of aerodynamic aircraft control systems.

Blériot found that the new aircraft flew very well, and for the first time he had sufficient control to fly in circles. He could also keep it aloft for up to eight minutes at a time. During the course of 1908, he modified it a number of times, calling the first major revision the VIII-bis and the next the VIII-ter. With this aircraft on June 29, Blériot claimed the second of three prizes being offered by the Automobile Club de France for a flight with an altitude of 200 m (660 ft). Longer and longer flights followed: on October 21, he made one of 7 km (4.3 mi), and ten days later flew 14 km (8.7 mi) cross-country from Toury to Artenay and flew back again.

== Specifications (VIII-ter) ==
General characteristics

- Crew: one pilot
- Length: 7.50 m (24 ft 7 in)
- Wingspan: 8.50 m (27 ft 11 in)
- Wing area: 22 m^{2} (237 sq ft)
