= Blériot III =

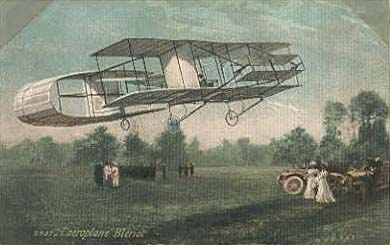
- The Bleriot IV depicted in a contemporary postcard. In reality, the aircraft never flew.

General information
- Type: Experimental aircraft
- Manufacturer: Louis Blériot and Gabriel Voisin
- Number built: 1

The Blériot III was an early French aeroplane built by pioneer aviators Louis Blériot and Gabriel Voisin. It was later modified and renamed the Blériot IV, but both versions failed to fly. The aircraft had an unusual design, with two large elliptical closed wing cells in tandem. After the failure of the Blériot IV, the partnership between Voisin and Blériot was dissolved.

== Design and development ==
The Blériot III was radically different from what was to become the orthodox design for aircraft, having two large elliptical closed wing cells in tandem connected by booms. A single transversely mounted 24 hp (18 kW) Antoinette engine mounted on the lower front wing drove two tractor propellers using flexible drive shafts incorporating reduction gearing to reduce the 1,800 rpm of the engine to 600 rpm. The transmission arrangement accounted for 100 kg of the aircraft's 400 kg weight. The undercarriage consisted of a pair of long floats under the front wing cell and a third below the aft wing cell. Blériot and Voisin attempted to fly it from the Lac d'Engheim in May 1906, but the machine would not become airborne.

In October they made major changes to the design, adding a rudder to the aft cell, replacing the forward wings with a more conventional biplane arrangement, adding a second engine, and changing the propellers from tractors to pushers. At this point, it was renamed the Blériot IV. Attempts to fly the aircraft as a floatplane were made on 12 and 18 October at Lac d'Engheim. Even with these modifications, the aircraft still refused to leave the ground. They then removed the floats and added a wheeled undercarriage. On 12 November 1906 further attempts at flight were made at the Parc de Bagatelle, but the aircraft hit an obstacle during a ground run and was damaged beyond repair. To underline this failure, Voisin and Blériot were then to witness Santos-Dumont's successful flight in the 14-bis, made at Bagatelle the same day. After this failure the partnership between Voisin and Blériot was dissolved, both men preferring to concentrate on their own design ideas. Voisin set up Appareils d'Aviation Les Frères Voisin with his brother, and Blériot went on to build further experimental aircraft in collaboration with various other people.

== Specifications (IV) ==
General characteristics

- Crew: one pilot
- Wingspan: 10.50 m (34 ft 5 in)
- Wing area: 73 m^{2} (785 sq ft)
- Gross weight: 480 kg (1,060 lb)
- Powerplant: 2 × Antoinette V-8 , 18 kW (24 hp) each
