= Blériot-SPAD S.30 =

French sports aircraft built in the early 1920s

SPAD S.30

General information
- Type: Sports aircraft
- National origin: France
- Manufacturer: SPAD
- Number built: 1

History
- First flight: January 1920

The Bleriot-SPAD S.30 was a French sports aircraft built in the early 1920s.

== Design ==
The S.30 was a biplane with a monocoque fuselage of wood and canvas construction. It was the first French aircraft to be built and equipped with a NACA cover. In September 1920, after initial flight tests, it was re-engined with a Le Rhone engine and redesignated S.30bis.

== Specifications ==
Data from

General characteristics

- Crew: 1
- Length: 5.94 m (19 ft 6 in)
- Wingspan: 7.14 m (23 ft 5 in)
- Height: 2.24 m (7 ft 4 in)
- Wing area: 15.40 m^{2} (165.8 sq ft)
- Empty weight: 333 kg (734 lb)
- Gross weight: 460 kg (1,014 lb)
- Powerplant: 1 × Anzani inline engine, 34 kW (45 hp)
- Propellers: 2-bladed fixed pitchpropeller

Performance

- Maximum speed: 170 km/h (110 mph, 92 kn)

== See also ==
Related lists

- List of Interwar military aircraft
