= Louis Blériot =

French aviator, inventor and engineer (1872–1936)

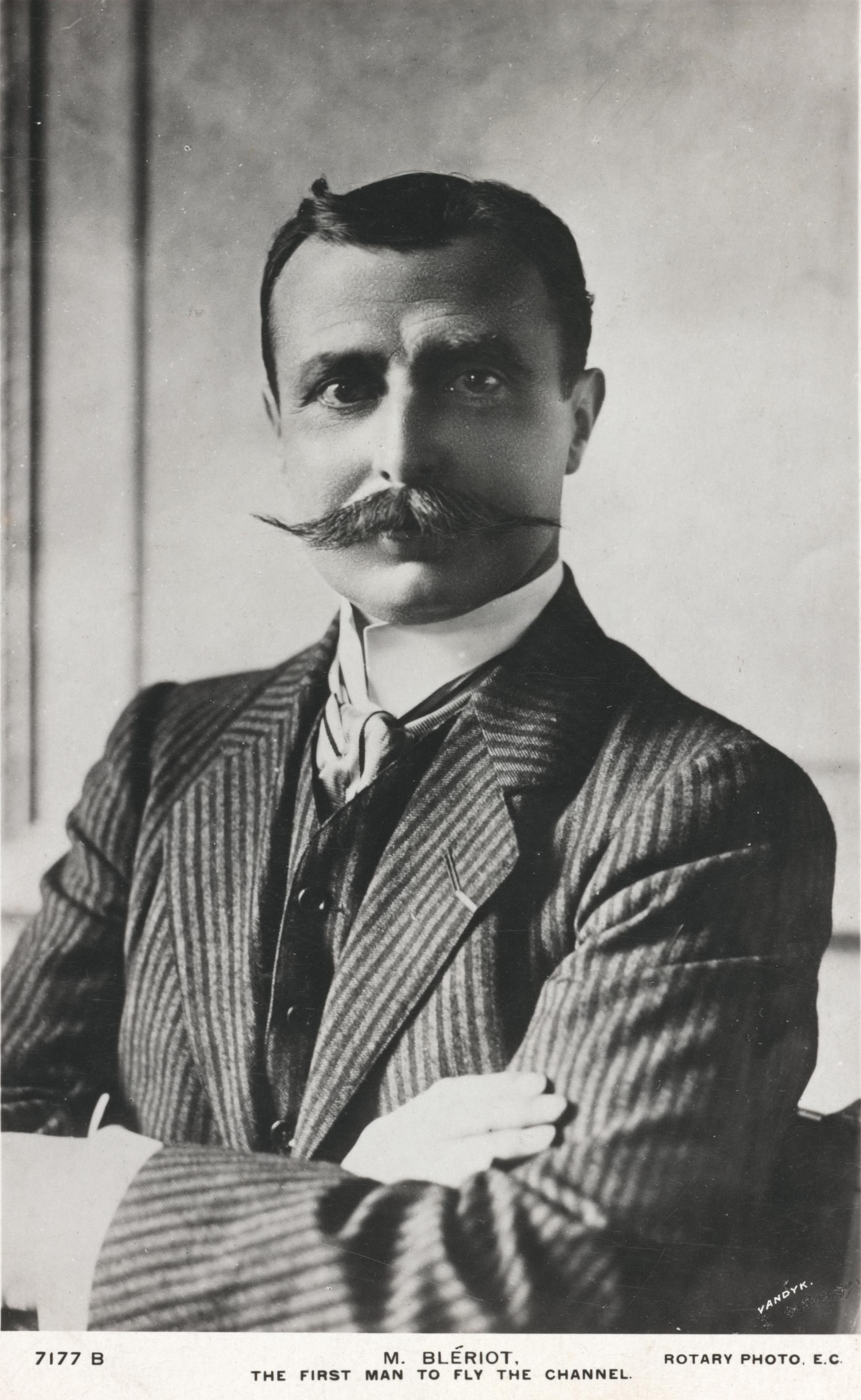
- Blériot c. 1911
- Born: Louis Charles Joseph Blériot; 1 July 1872; Cambrai, France
- Died: 1 August 1936 (aged 64); Paris, France
- Education: École Centrale Paris
- Occupations: Inventor and engineer
- Known for: First heavier-than-air flight across the English Channel, first working monoplane
- Spouse: Alice Védère (1901) (1883-1963)
- Awards: Commandeur, Légion d'honneur Prix Osiris

Louis Charles Joseph Blériot (English: /ˈblɛrioʊ/ BLERR-ee-oh, also US: /ˈbleɪrioʊ, ˌbleɪriˈoʊ, blɛərˈjoʊ/ BLAY-ree-oh, -OH, blair-YOH, French: [lwi ʃaʁl ʒozɛf bleʁjo]; 1 July 1872 – 1 August 1936) was a French aviator, inventor, and engineer. He developed the first practical headlamp for cars and established a profitable business manufacturing them, using much of the money he made to finance his attempts to build a successful aircraft. Blériot was the first to use the combination of hand-operated joystick and foot-operated rudder control as used to the present day to operate the aircraft control surfaces. Blériot was also the first to make a working, powered, piloted monoplane. In 1909 he became world-famous for making the first aeroplane flight across the English Channel, winning the prize of £1,000 (worth £152,113 in 2025) offered by the Daily Mail newspaper. (Note: The first flight across the English Channel was made in 1785 using a hydrogen balloon.) He was the founder of Blériot Aéronautique, a successful aircraft manufacturing company.

== Early years ==
Born at No.17h rue de l'Arbre à Poires (now rue Sadi-Carnot) in Cambrai, Louis was the first of five children born to Clémence and Charles Blériot. In 1882, aged 10, Blériot was sent as a boarder to the Institut Notre Dame in Cambrai, where he frequently won class prizes, including one for engineering drawing. When he was 15, he moved on to the lycée at Amiens, where he lived with an aunt. After passing the exams for his baccalaureate in science and German, he determined to try to enter the prestigious École Centrale in Paris. Entrance was by a demanding exam for which special tuition was necessary: consequently Blériot spent a year at the Collège Sainte-Barbe in Paris. He passed the exam, placing 74th among the 243 successful candidates, and doing especially well in the tests of engineering drawing ability. After three years of demanding study at the École Centrale, Blériot graduated 113th of 203 in his graduating class. He then embarked on a term of compulsory military service, and spent a year as a sub-lieutenant in the 24th Artillery Regiment, stationed in Tarbes in the Pyrenees.

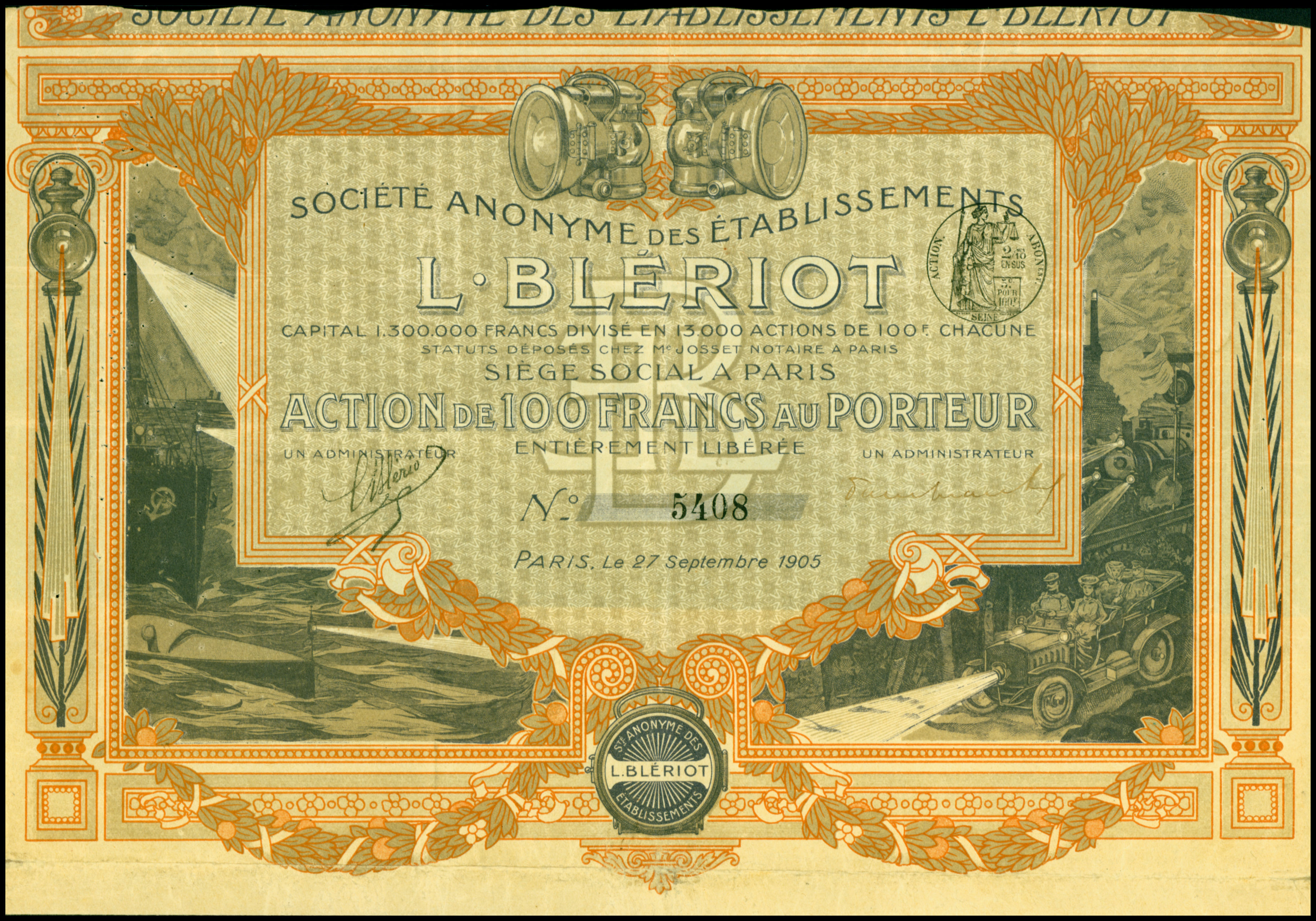
Share of the Etablissements L. Blériot, issued 27 September 1905

He later got a job with Baguès, an electrical engineering company in Paris. He left the company after developing the world's first practical headlamp for automobiles, using a compact integral acetylene generator. In 1897, Blériot opened a showroom for headlamps at 41 rue de Richlieu in Paris. The business was successful, and soon he was supplying his lamps to both Renault and Panhard-Levassor, two of the foremost automobile manufacturers of the day.

In October 1900 Blériot was lunching in his usual restaurant near his showroom when his eye was caught by a young woman dining with her parents. That evening, he told his mother "I saw a young woman today. I will marry her, or I will marry no one." A bribe to a waiter secured her identity; she was Alice Védères, the daughter of a retired army officer. Blériot set about courting her with the same determination that he later brought to his aviation experiments, and on 21 February 1901 the couple were married.

== Early aviation experiments ==
Blériot had become interested in aviation while at the Ecole Centrale, but his serious experimentation was probably sparked by seeing Clément Ader's Avion III at the 1900 Exposition Universelle. By then his headlamp business was doing well enough for Blériot to be able to devote both time and money to experimentation. His first experiments were with a series of ornithopters, which were unsuccessful. In April 1905, Blériot met Gabriel Voisin, who was then employed by Ernest Archdeacon to assist with his experimental gliders.

Blériot was a spectator at Voisin's first trials of the floatplane glider he had built on 8 June 1905. Cine photography was among Blériot's hobbies, and the film footage of this flight was shot by him. The success of these trials prompted him to commission a similar machine from Voisin, the Blériot II glider. On 18 July an attempt to fly this aircraft was made, ending in a crash in which Voisin nearly drowned, but this did not deter Blériot. Indeed, he suggested that Voisin should stop working for Archdeacon and enter into partnership with him. Voisin accepted the proposal, and together with his brother Charles Voisin and Édouard Surcouf they established the Ateliers d' Aviation Edouard Surcouf, Blériot et Voisin, possibly the world's first aircraft manufacturing company. Active between 1905 and 1906, the company built two unsuccessful powered aircraft, the Blériot III and the Blériot IV, which was largely a rebuild of its predecessor. Both these aircraft were powered with the lightweight Antoinette engines being developed by Léon Levavasseur. Blériot became a shareholder in the company, and in May 1906, joined the board of directors.

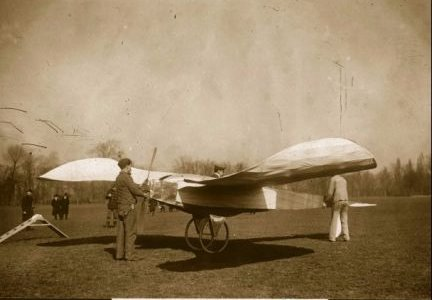
The Blériot V canard monoplane, built in January 1907

The Blériot IV was damaged in a taxiing accident at Bagatelle on 12 November 1906. The disappointment of the failure of his aircraft was compounded by the success of Alberto Santos Dumont later that day, when he managed to fly his 14-bis a distance of 220 m (720 ft), winning the Aéro Club de France prize for the first flight of over 100 metres. This also took place at Bagatelle, and was witnessed by Blériot. The partnership with Voisin was dissolved and Blériot established his own business, Recherches Aéronautiques Louis Blériot, where he started creating his own aircraft, experimenting with various configurations and eventually creating the world's first successful powered monoplane.

The first of these, the canard configuration Blériot V, was first tried on 21 March 1907, when Blériot limited his experiments to ground runs, which resulted in damage to the undercarriage. Two further ground trials, also damaging the aircraft, were undertaken, followed by another attempt on 5 April. The flight was only of around 6 m (20 ft), after which he cut his engine and landed, slightly damaging the undercarriage. More trials followed, the last on 19 April when, travelling at a speed of around 50 km/h (30 mph), the aircraft left the ground, Blériot over-responded when the nose began to rise, and the machine hit the ground nose-first, and somersaulted. The aircraft was largely destroyed, but Blériot was, by great good fortune, unhurt. The engine of the aircraft was immediately behind his seat, and he was very lucky not to have been crushed by it.

This was followed by the Blériot VI, a tandem wing design, first tested on 7 July, when the aircraft failed to lift off. Blériot then enlarged the wings slightly, and on 11 July a short successful flight of around 25–30 metres (84–100 ft) was made, reaching an altitude of around 2 m (7 ft). This was Blériot's first truly successful flight. Further successful flights took place that month, and by 25 July he had managed a flight of 150 m (490 ft). On 6 August he managed to reach an altitude of 12 m (39 ft), but one of the blades of the propeller worked loose, resulting in a heavy landing which damaged the aircraft. He then fitted a 50 hp (37 kW) V-16 Antoinette engine. Tests on 17 September showed a startling improvement in performance: the aircraft quickly reached an altitude of 25 m (82 ft), when the engine suddenly cut out and the aircraft went into a spiralling nosedive. In desperation Blériot climbed out of his seat and threw himself towards the tail. The aircraft partially pulled out of the dive, and came to earth in a more or less horizontal attitude. His only injuries were some minor cuts on the face, caused by fragments of glass from his broken goggles. After this crash Blériot abandoned the aircraft, concentrating on his next machine.

This, the Blériot VII, was a monoplane with tail surfaces arranged in what has become, apart from its use of differential elevators movement for lateral control, the modern conventional layout. This aircraft, which first flew on 16 November 1907, has been recognised as the first successful monoplane. On 6 December Blériot managed two flights of over 500 metres, including a successful U-turn. This was the most impressive achievement to date of any of the French pioneer aviators, causing Patrick Alexander to write to Major Baden Baden-Powell, president of the Royal Aeronautical Society, "I got back from Paris last night. I think Blériot with his new machine is leading the way". Two more successful flights were made on 18 December, but the undercarriage collapsed after the second flight; the aircraft overturned and was wrecked.

Blériot's next aircraft, the Blériot VIII was shown to the press in February 1908. Although it was the first to use a successful combination of hand/arm-operated joystick and foot-operated rudder control, this was a failure in its first form. After modifications, it proved successful, and on 31 October 1908 he succeeded in making a cross-country flight, making a round trip from Toury to Arteny and back, a total distance of 28 km (17 mi). This was not the first cross-country flight by a narrow margin, since Henri Farman had flown from Bouy to Rheims the preceding day. Four days later, the aircraft was destroyed in a taxiing accident.

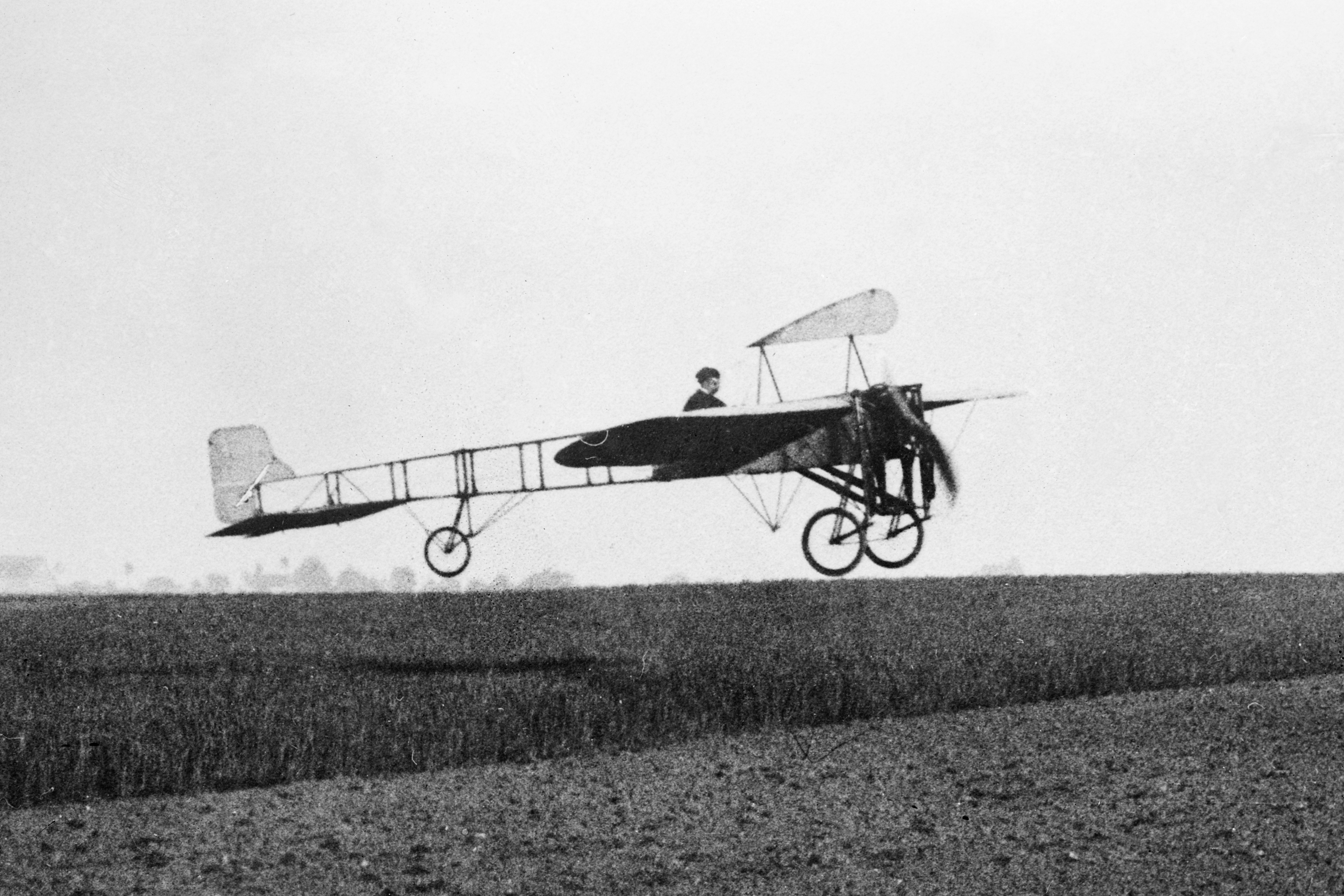
The first Blériot XI in early 1909

Three of his aircraft were displayed at the first Paris Aero Salon, held at the end of December: the Blériot IX monoplane; the Blériot X, a three-seat pusher biplane; and the Blériot XI, which went on to be his most successful model. The first two of the designs, which used Antoinette engines, never flew, possibly because at this time, Blériot severed his connection with the Antoinette company because the company had begun to design and construct aircraft as well as engines, presenting Blériot with a conflict of interests. The Type XI was initially powered by a REP engine and was first flown with this engine on 18 January 1909, but although the aircraft flew well, after a very short time in the air, the engine began to overheat, leading Blériot to get in touch with Alessandro Anzani, who had developed a successful motorcycle engine and had subsequently entered the aero-engine market. Importantly, Anzani was associated with Lucien Chauvière, who had designed a sophisticated laminated walnut propeller. The combination of a reliable engine and an efficient propeller contributed greatly to the success of the Type XI.

This was shortly followed by the Blériot XII, a high-wing two-seater monoplane first flown on 21 May, and for a while Blériot concentrated on flying this machine, flying it with a passenger on 2 July, and on 12 July making the world's first flight with two passengers, one of whom was Santos Dumont. A few days later the crankshaft of the E.N.V. engine broke, and Blériot resumed trials of the Type XI. On 25 June he made a flight lasting 15 minutes and 30 seconds, his longest to date, and the following day increased this personal record to over 36 minutes. At the end of July he took part in an aviation meet at Douai, where he made a flight lasting over 47 minutes in the Type XII on 3 July: the following day he flew the Type XI for 50 minutes at another meet at Port-Aviation (often called "Juvisy Airfield") at Viry-Châtillon, and on 13 July he made a cross-country flight of 41 km (25 mi) from Etampes to Orléans. Blériot's determination is shown by the fact that during the flight at Douai made on 2 July part of the asbestos insulation worked loose from the exhaust pipe after 15 minutes in the air. After half an hour, one of his shoes had been burnt through and he was in considerable pain, but nevertheless continued his flight until engine failure ended the flight. Blériot suffered third-degree burns, and his injuries took over two months to heal.

On 16 June 1909, Blériot and Voisin were jointly awarded the Prix Osiris, awarded by the Institut de France every three years to the Frenchman who had made the greatest contribution to science. Three days later, on 19 June, he informed the Daily Mail of his intention to make an attempt to win the thousand-pound prize offered by the paper for a successful crossing of the English Channel in a heavier-than-air aircraft.

== 1909 Channel crossing ==
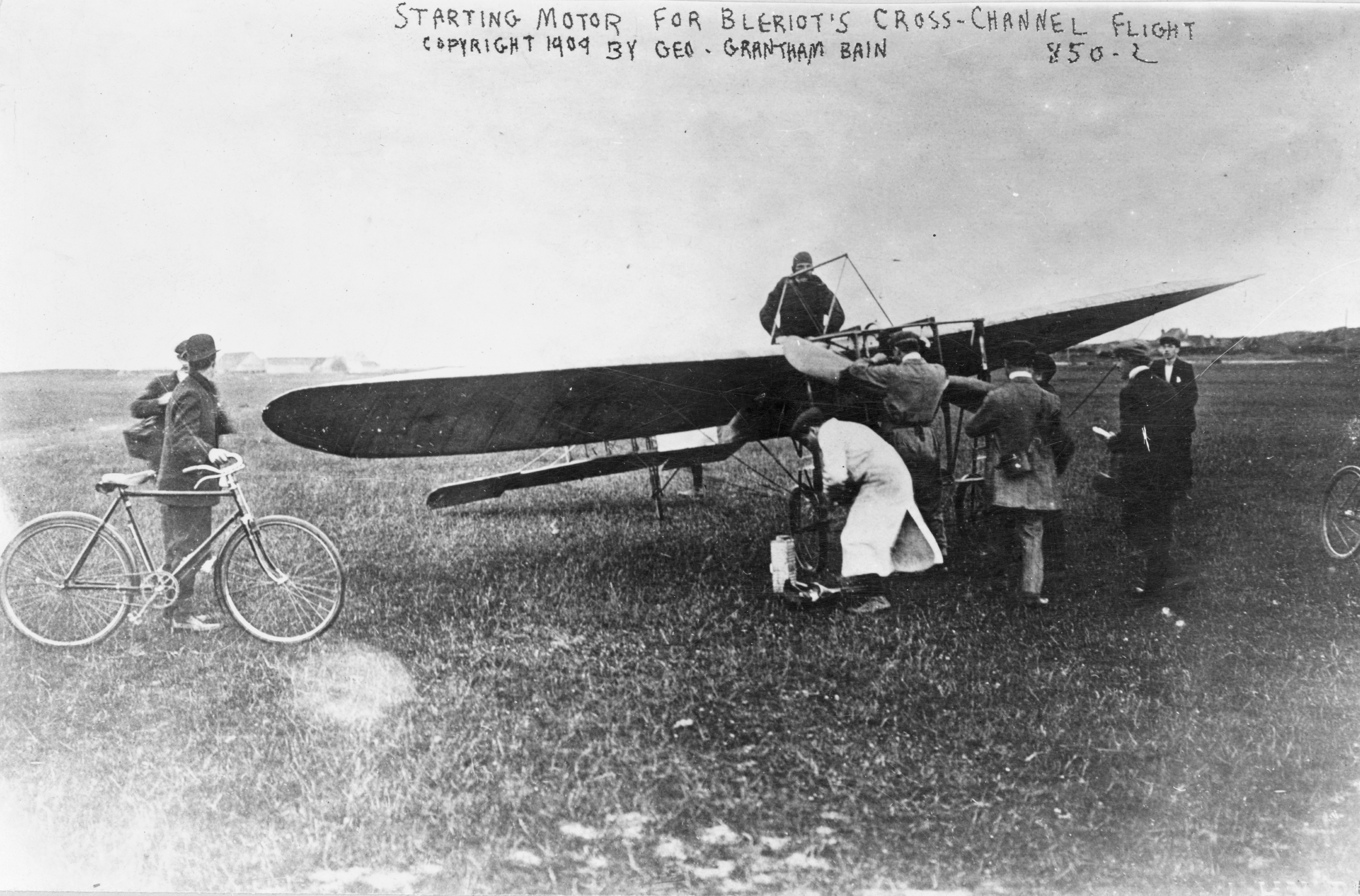
Starting the engine, 25 July 1909

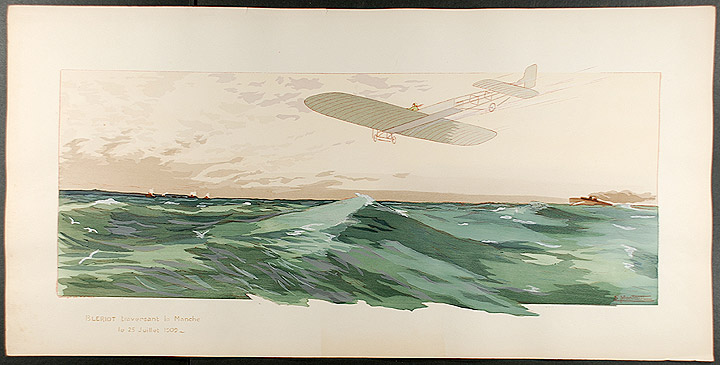
Blériot crossing the Channel on 25 July 1909

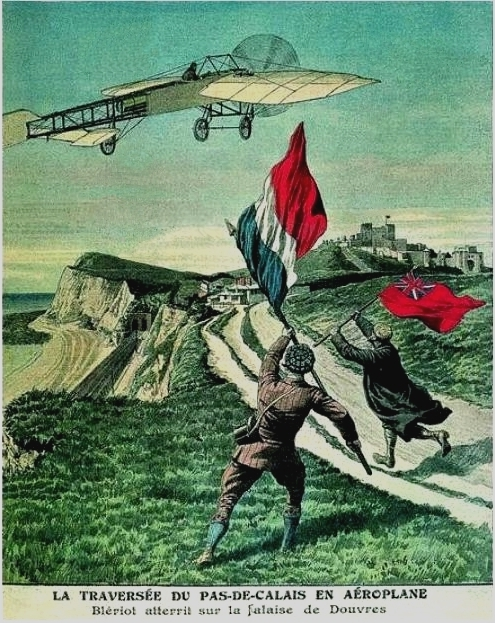

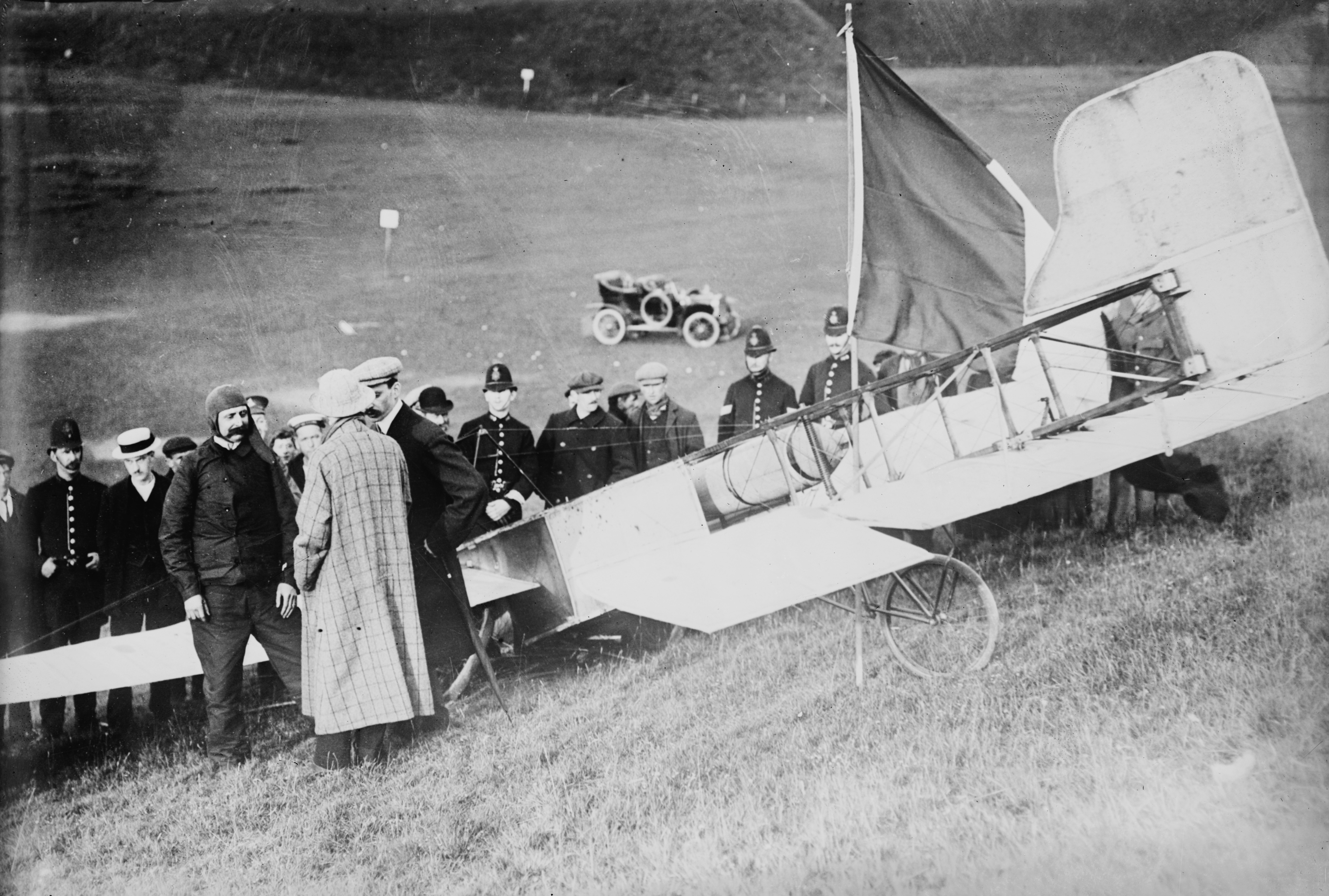
The scene shortly after Blériot's arrival

The Daily Mail prize was first announced in October 1908, with a prize of £500 being offered for a flight made before the end of the year. When 1908 passed with no serious attempt being made, the offer was renewed for the year of 1909, with the prize money doubled to £1,000 (equivalent to £102,914 in 2025). Like some of the other prizes offered, it was widely seen as nothing more than a way to gain cheap publicity for the paper: the Paris newspaper Le Matin commenting that there was no chance of the prize being won.

The English Channel had been crossed many times by balloon, beginning with Jean-Pierre Blanchard and John Jeffries's crossing in 1785.

Blériot, who intended to fly across the Channel in his Type XI monoplane, had three rivals for the prize, the most serious being Hubert Latham, a French national of English extraction flying an Antoinette IV monoplane. He was favoured by both the United Kingdom and France to win. The others were Charles de Lambert, a Russian aristocrat with French ancestry, and one of Wilbur Wright's pupils, and Arthur Seymour, an Englishman who reputedly owned a Voisin biplane. De Lambert got as far as establishing a base at Wissant, near Calais, but Seymour did nothing beyond submitting his entry to the Daily Mail. Lord Northcliffe, who had befriended Wilbur Wright during his sensational 1908 public demonstrations in France, had offered the prize hoping that Wilbur would win. Wilbur wanted to make an attempt and cabled brother Orville in the United States. Orville, then recuperating from serious injuries sustained in a crash, replied telling him not to make the Channel attempt until he could come to France and assist. Also Wilbur had already amassed a fortune in prize money for altitude and duration flights and had secured sales contracts for the Wright Flyer with the French, Italians, British and Germans; his tour in Europe was essentially complete by the summer of 1909. Both brothers saw the Channel reward of only a thousand pounds as insignificant considering the dangers of the flight.

Latham arrived in Calais in early July, and set up his base at Sangatte in the semi-derelict buildings which had been constructed for an 1881 attempt to dig a tunnel under the Channel. The event was the subject of great public interest; it was reported that there were 10,000 visitors at Calais and a similar crowd at Dover. The Marconi Company set up a special radio link for the occasion, with one station on Cap Blanc Nez near Sangatte and the other on the roof of the Lord Warden Hotel in Dover. The crowds were in for a wait: the weather was windy, and Latham did not make an attempt until 19 July, but 6 miles (9.7 km) from his destination his aircraft developed engine trouble and was forced to make the world's first landing of an aircraft on the sea. Latham was rescued by the French destroyer Harpon and taken back to France, where he was met by the news that Blériot had entered the competition. Blériot, accompanied by two mechanics and his friend Alfred Leblanc, arrived in Calais on Wednesday 21 July and set up their base at a farm near the beach at Les Baraques, between Calais and Sangatte. The following day a replacement aircraft for Latham was delivered from the Antoinette factory. The wind was too strong for an attempted crossing on Friday and Saturday, but on Saturday evening it began to drop, raising hopes in both camps.

Leblanc went to bed at around midnight but was too keyed up to sleep well; at two o'clock, he was up, and judging that the weather was ideal woke Blériot who, unusually, was pessimistic and had to be persuaded to eat breakfast. His spirits revived, however, and by half past three, his wife Alice had boarded the destroyer Escopette, which was to escort the flight.

At 4:15 am, 25 July, watched by an excited crowd, Blériot made a short trial flight in his Type XI, and then, on a signal that the sun had risen (the competition rules required a flight between sunrise and sunset), he took off at 4:41 to attempt the crossing. Flying at approximately 45 mph (72 km/h) and an altitude of about 250 ft (76 m), he set off across the Channel. Not having a compass, Blériot took his course from the Escopette, which was heading for Dover, but he soon overtook the ship. The visibility deteriorated, and he later said, "for more than 10 minutes I was alone, isolated, lost in the midst of the immense sea, and I did not see anything on the horizon or a single ship". The grey line of the English coast, however, came into sight on his left; the wind had increased, and had blown him to the east of his intended course. Altering course, he followed the line of the coast about a mile offshore until he spotted Charles Fontaine, the correspondent from Le Matin waving a large Tricolour as a signal. Unlike Latham, Blériot had not visited Dover to find a suitable spot to land, and the choice had been made by Fontaine, who had selected ( on the advice of Frederick Duckham, an engineer in charge of Dover harbour works) a patch of gently sloping land called Northfall Meadow, close to Dover Castle, on top of the cliffs. Once over land, Blériot circled twice to lose height, and cut his engine at an altitude of about 20 m (66 ft), making a heavy "pancake" landing due to the gusty wind conditions; the undercarriage was damaged and one blade of the propeller was shattered, but Blériot was unhurt. The flight had taken 36 minutes and 30 seconds.

News of his departure had been sent by radio to Dover, but it was generally expected that he would attempt to land on the beach to the west of the town. The Daily Mail correspondent, realising that Blériot had landed near the castle, set off at speed in a motor car and took Blériot to the harbour, where he was reunited with his wife. The couple, surrounded by a cheering crowd and photographers, were then taken to the Lord Warden Hotel at the foot of the Admiralty Pier; Blériot had become a celebrity.

The Blériot Memorial, the outline of the aircraft laid out in granite setts in the turf (funded by oil manufacturer Alexander Duckham), and built by his brother Frederick Duckham (see above) marks his landing spot above the cliffs near Dover Castle (51.1312°N 1.326°E).

The aircraft which was used in the crossing is now preserved in the Musée des Arts et Métiers in Paris.

== Later life ==
Blériot's success brought about an immediate transformation of the status of Recherches Aéronautiques Louis Blériot. By the time of the Channel flight, he had spent at least 780,000 francs on his aviation experiments. (To put this figure into context, one of Blériot's skilled mechanics was paid 250 francs a month.) Now this investment began to pay off: orders for copies of the Type XI quickly came, and by the end of the year, orders for over 100 aircraft had been received, each selling for 10,000 francs.

At the end of August, Blériot was one of the flyers at the Grande Semaine d'Aviation held at Reims, where he was narrowly beaten by Glenn Curtiss in the first Gordon Bennett Trophy. Blériot did, however, succeed in winning the prize for the fastest lap of the circuit, establishing a new world speed record for aircraft.

Blériot followed his flights at Reims with appearances at other aviation meetings in Brescia, Budapest and Bucharest in 1909 (making the first airplane flights in both Hungary and Romania). Up to this time he had had great good luck in walking away from accidents that had destroyed the aircraft, but his luck deserted him in December 1909 at an aviation meeting in Istanbul. Flying in gusty conditions to placate an impatient and restive crowd, he crashed on top of a house, breaking several ribs and suffering internal injuries: he was hospitalized for three weeks.

Between 1909 and the outbreak of World War I in 1914, Blériot produced about 900 aircraft, most of them variations of the Type XI model. Blériot monoplanes and Voisin-type biplanes, with the latter's Farman derivatives dominated the pre-war aviation market. There were concerns about the safety of monoplanes in general, both in France and the UK. The French government grounded all monoplanes in the French Army from February 1912 after accidents to four Blériots, but lifted it after trials in May supported Blériot's analysis of the problem and led to a strengthening of the landing wires. The brief but influential ban on the use of monoplanes by the Military Wing (though not the Naval Wing) in the UK was triggered by accidents to other manufacturer's aircraft; Blériots were not involved.

Along with five other European aircraft builders, from 1910, Blériot was involved in a five-year legal struggle with the Wright Brothers over the latter's wing warping patents. The Wrights' claim was dismissed in the French and the German courts.

From 1913 or earlier, Blériot's aviation activities were handled by Blériot Aéronautique, based at Suresnes, which continued to design and produce aircraft up to the nationalisation of most of the French aircraft industry in 1937, when it was absorbed into SNCASO.

In 1913, a consortium led by Blériot bought the Société pour les Appareils Deperdussin aircraft manufacturer and he became the president of the company in 1914. He renamed it the Société Pour L'Aviation et ses Dérivés (SPAD); this company produced World War I fighter aircraft such as the SPAD S.XIII.

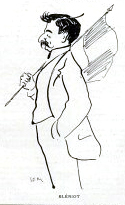
Caricature of Louis Blériot by Sem (1910)

Before World War I, Blériot had opened British flying schools at Brooklands, in Surrey and at Hendon Aerodrome. Realising that a British company would have more chance to sell his models to the British government, in 1915, he set up the Blériot Manufacturing Aircraft Company Ltd. The hoped for orders did not follow, as the Blériot design was seen as outdated. Following an unresolved conflict over control of the company, it was wound up on 24 July 1916. Even before the closure of this company Blériot was planning a new venture in the UK. Initially named Blériot and SPAD Ltd and based in Addlestone, it became the Air Navigation and Engineering Company (ANEC) in May 1918. ANEC survived in a difficult aviation climate until late 1926, producing Blériot-Whippet cars, the Blériot 500cc motorcycle, as well as several light aircraft.

In 1927, Blériot, long retired from flying, was present to welcome Charles Lindbergh when he landed at Le Bourget field completing his transatlantic flight. The two men, separated in age by 30 years, had each made history by crossing significant bodies of water, and shared a photo opportunity in Paris.

In 1934, Blériot visited Newark Airport in New Jersey and predicted commercial overseas flights by 1938.

== Death ==
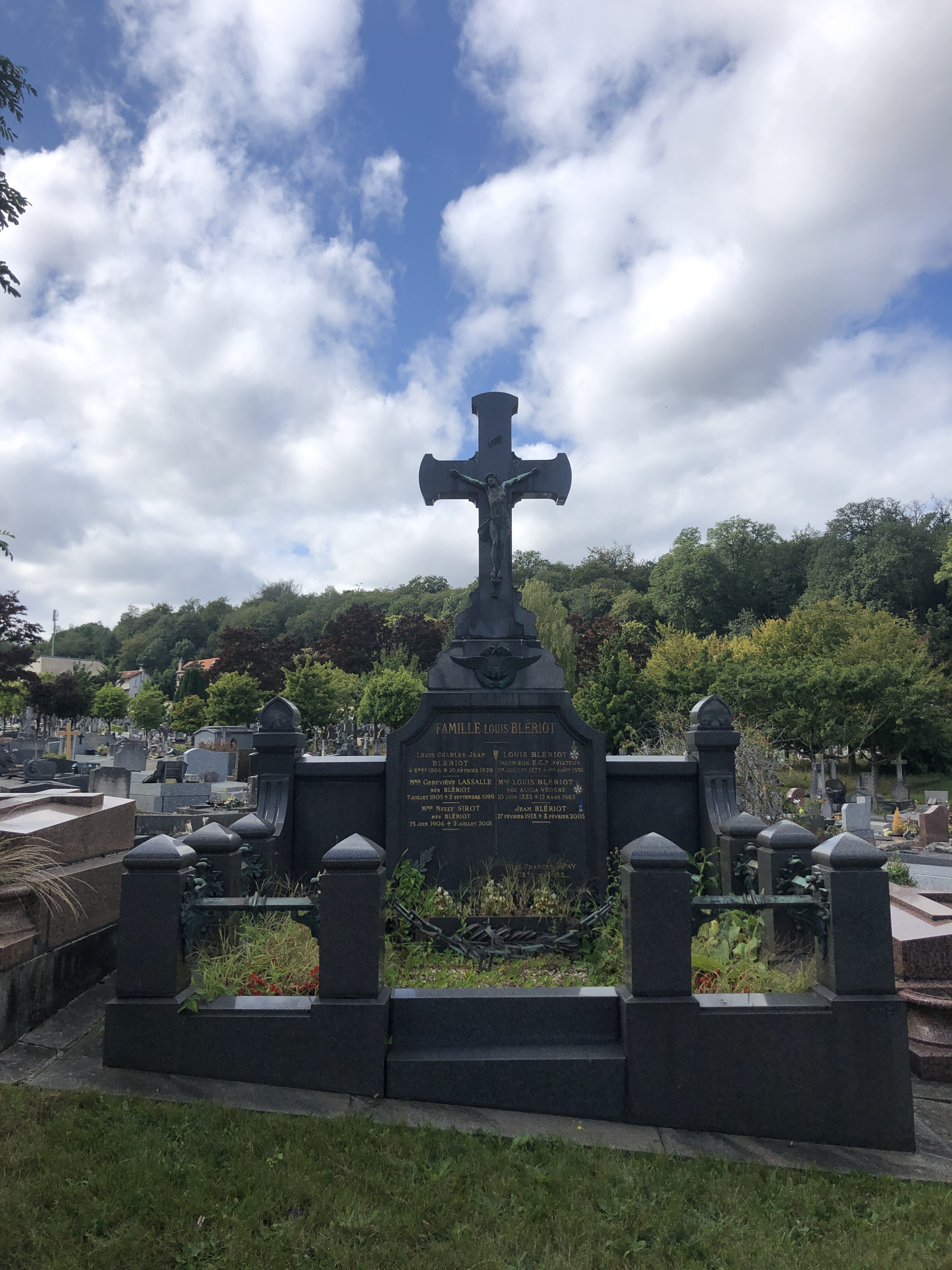
Grave of Louis Blériot.

Blériot remained active in the aviation business until his death on 1 August 1936 in Paris due to a heart attack. After a funeral with full military honours at Les Invalides he was buried in the Cimetière des Gonards in Versailles.

== Legacy ==
In 1930, Blériot himself instituted the Blériot Trophy, a one-time award which would be awarded to the first aircrew to sustain an average speed of over 2,000 kilometers per hour (1,242.742 miles per hour) over one half of an hour, an extremely ambitious and prophetic target in an era when the fastest aircraft were just breaking the 200 mph mark. The award was finally presented slightly more than three decades later by Alice Védères Blériot, widow of Louis Blériot, at Paris, France, 27 May 1961, to the crew of the United States Air Force Convair B-58A jet bomber, AF serial number 59-2451, The Firefly, crewed by Aircraft Commander Major Elmer E. Murphy, Navigator Major Eugene Moses, and Defensive Systems Officer First Lieutenant David F. Dickerson who on 10 May 1961, sustained an average speed of 2,095 kmph (1,302.07 mph) over 30 minutes and 43 seconds, covering a ground track of 1,077.3 kilometers (669.4 miles). This same crew and aircraft went on to set a number of other speed records before being lost in an accident shortly after takeoff from Paris, not long after setting yet another speed record, winning the Harmon Trophy for a record-setting flight between New York City and Paris, France. This flight was 3,626.46 miles in 3 hours, 19 minutes, 58 seconds, for an average of 1,089.36 mph. The Blériot Trophy winning crew took over the aircraft for the return flight, but were all killed when the pilot lost control shortly after takeoff from the Paris Air Show during some attempted impromptu aerobatics. The Blériot Trophy is a statuette in the classical style sculpted of polished white and black marble stone, depicting a nude male figure of black marble emerging from stylized white marble clouds resembling female forms. It is now on permanent display at the McDermott Library of the United States Air Force Academy, Colorado Springs, Colorado, USA.

In 1936 the Fédération Aéronautique Internationale established the "Louis Blériot medal" in his honor. The medal may be awarded up to three times a year to record setters in speed, altitude and distance categories in light aircraft, and is still being awarded.

In 1967 Blériot was inducted into the International Air & Space Hall of Fame.

On 25 July 2009, the centenary of the original Channel crossing, Frenchman Edmond Salis took off from Blériot Beach in a replica of Bleriot's aircraft. He landed successfully in Kent at the Duke of York's Royal Military School.

== Honors and awards ==
- Commander of the Order of Legion of Honour
- Officer in the Ordre des Palmes Académiques
- Officer in the Order of the Crown of Italy
- Commander in the Order of the Crown of Romania

== In popular culture ==
- From 1978 to 2003, KLM operated a Boeing 747-200 (registration serial PH-BUK) named after Blériot. The aircraft is currently preserved in the Aviodrome aerospace museum in Lelystad Airport.
- In 2002 British train company Virgin CrossCountry named Class 221 221101 Louis Blériot.
- In 2006 Rivendell Bicycle Works introduced a bicycle model named the "Blériot 650B" as a tribute to Blériot. It features his portrait on the seat tube.
- A propeller moonlet in the rings of Saturn was nicknamed Bleriot by imaging scientists.

== See also ==
- Blériot Aéronautique
- Early flying machines
- List of firsts in aviation
