= Blériot-SPAD S.56 =

S.56
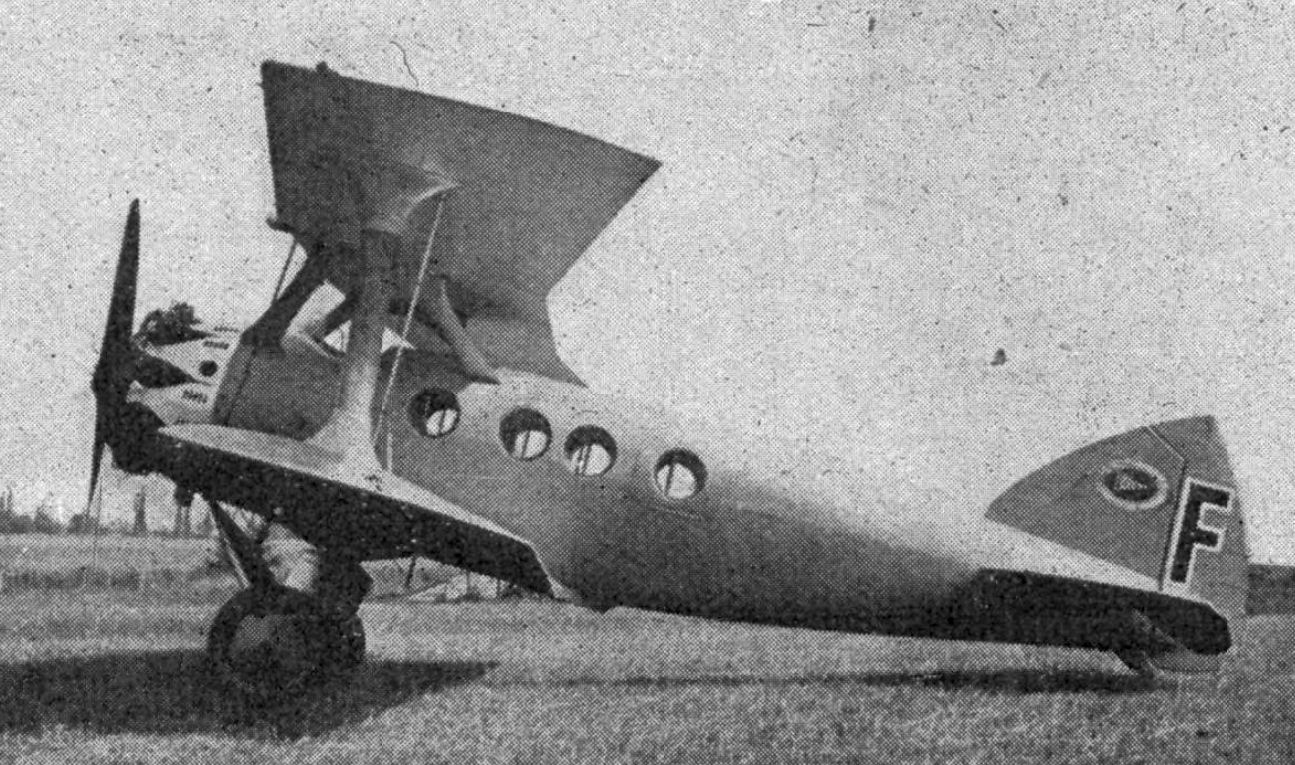

General information
- Type: Airliner
- Manufacturer: Blériot
- Number built: 22

History
- First flight: February 3 1923
- Developed from: Blériot-SPAD S.33

The Blériot-SPAD S.56 was a family of French airliners developed in the 1920s as various refinements of the S.33 design. All S.56 versions shared two new features: the first was a newly designed, all-metal wing, replacing the wooden wing of earlier related designs and the second was a redesigned passenger cabin, replacing the S.33's four single seats in a row with two rows of double seats. A second access door was also added.

== Variants ==
S.56/1
basic version with 194 kW (260 hp) Salmson CM.9 radial engine and later a 280 kW (380 hp) Gnome & Rhône 9Aa. 1 built.

S.56/2
similar to the S.56/1, with a 310 kW (420 hp) Gnome & Rhône 9Ab engine. 1 built.

S.56/3
similar to S.56/2 with improved landing gear and 280 kW (380 hp) Gnome & Rhône 9Aa engine. 8 built.

S.56/4
major fuselage revision; cockpit relocated between engine and passenger cabin (in all previous S.33 derivatives, it had been aft of the cabin) and an extra double seat added to the cabin, increasing internal passenger capacity to six. Powered by 310 kW (420 hp) Gnome & Rhône 9Ady engines. 8 built, plus 2 modified from S.56/3s.

S.56/5
revised passenger cabin with four seats located in one compartment, and two in a second compartment that could be quickly converted to a freight hold. 2 built, plus 6 modified from S.56/3s and 2 from S.56/4s.

S.56/6
similar to S.56/3 but customised for banner towing for the Air Publicité company, powered by a 310 kW (420 hp) Gnome & Rhône 9Ab engine. 2 built; one ended up as a transport in the Spanish Republican Air Force during the Spanish Civil War.

== Operators ==
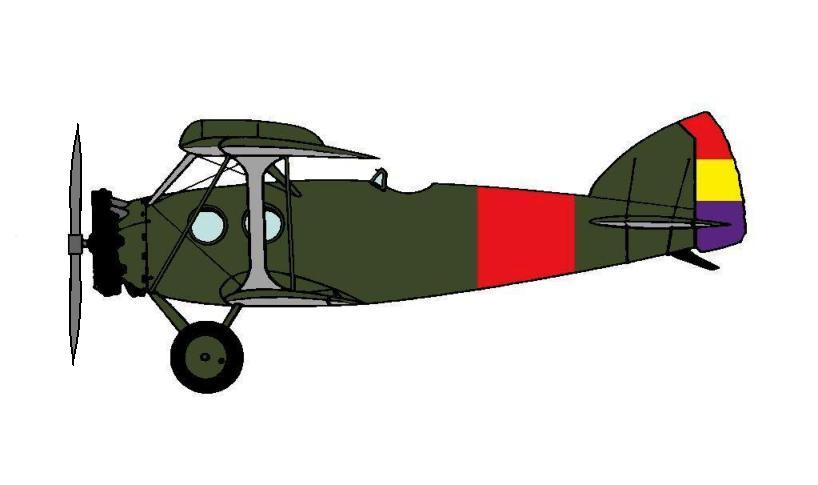
Spanish Blériot-Spad S.56/6

France

- Air Union (S.56/3, S.56/4)
- CIDNA (S.56/1, S.56/3, S.56/4, S.56/5)

Spain

- Spanish Republican Air Force (S.56/6)

== Specifications (S.56/4) ==
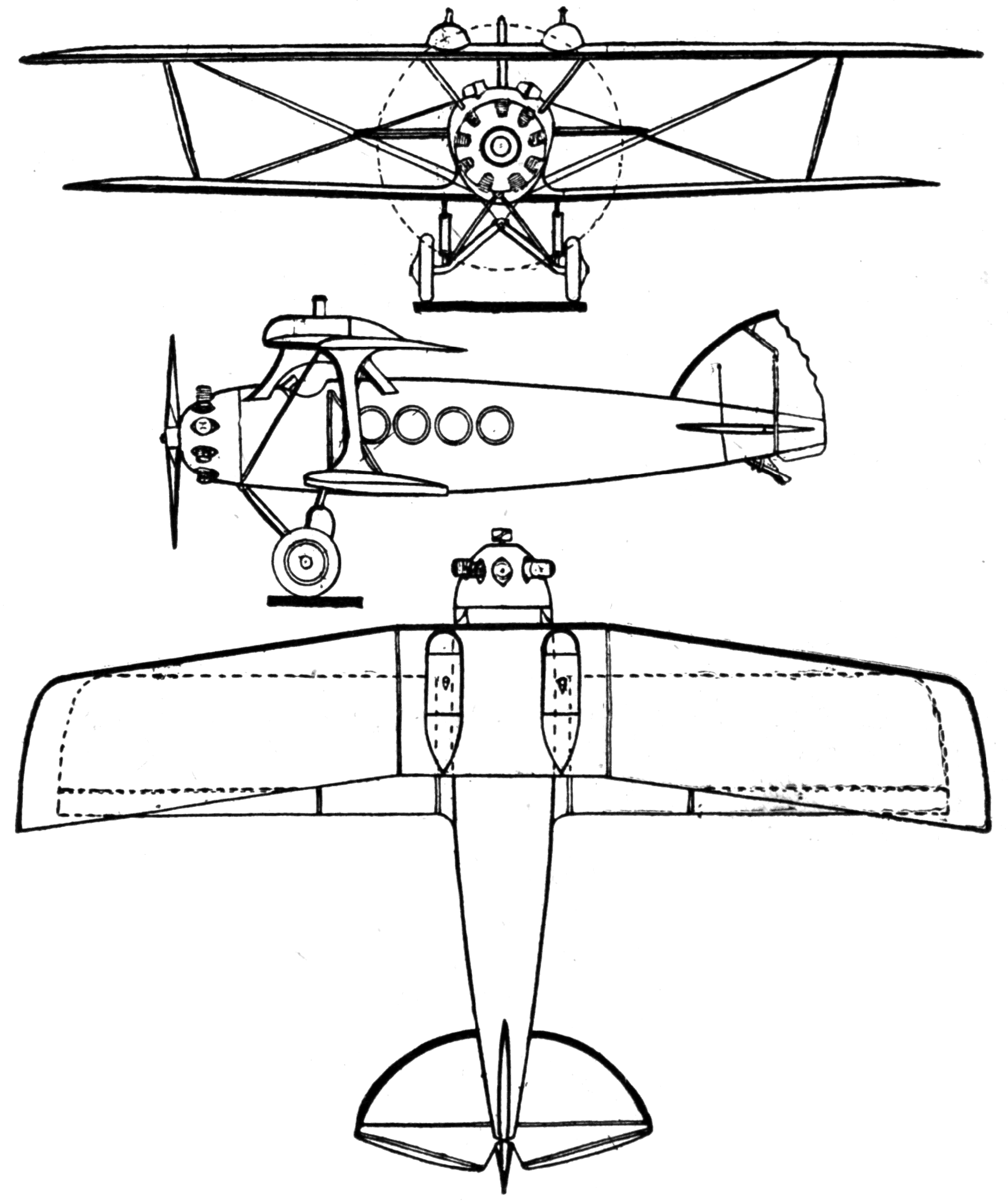
Bleriot SPAD S.56/4 3-view drawing from Les Ailes December 1,1927

Data from Jane's all the World's Aircraft 1928, Aviafrance: SPAD S.56/4

General characteristics

- Crew: 1
- Capacity: 6 pax
- Length: 9 m (29 ft 6 in)
- Wingspan: 13.08 m (42 ft 11 in)
- Height: 4.1 m (13 ft 5 in)
- Wing area: 46.07 m^{2} (495.9 sq ft)
- Empty weight: 1,453 kg (3,203 lb)
- Gross weight: 2,428 kg (5,353 lb)
- Powerplant: 1 × Gnome & Rhône 9Ady 9-cylinder air-cooled radial piston engine, 310 kW (420 hp)

Performance

- Maximum speed: 195 km/h (121 mph, 105 kn)
- Range: 620 km (390 mi, 330 nmi)
- Service ceiling: 4,800 m (15,700 ft)
- Wing loading: 52 kg/m^{2} (11 lb/sq ft)
- Power/mass: 0.1294 kW/kg (0.0787 hp/lb)

== See also ==
Related development

- S.33
- S.46
- S.50
- S.66
- S.86
- S.116
- S.126
