= CFRNA =

1925–1933 airline in France

CFRNA - CIDNA
- Founded: 1920, France
- Commenced operations: 1920, France
- Ceased operations: 7 October 1933 (merged with Air Orient, Air Union, Aéropostale and SGTA to form Air France)
- Operating bases: Paris, France; Bucharest, Romania
- Headquarters: Paris, France

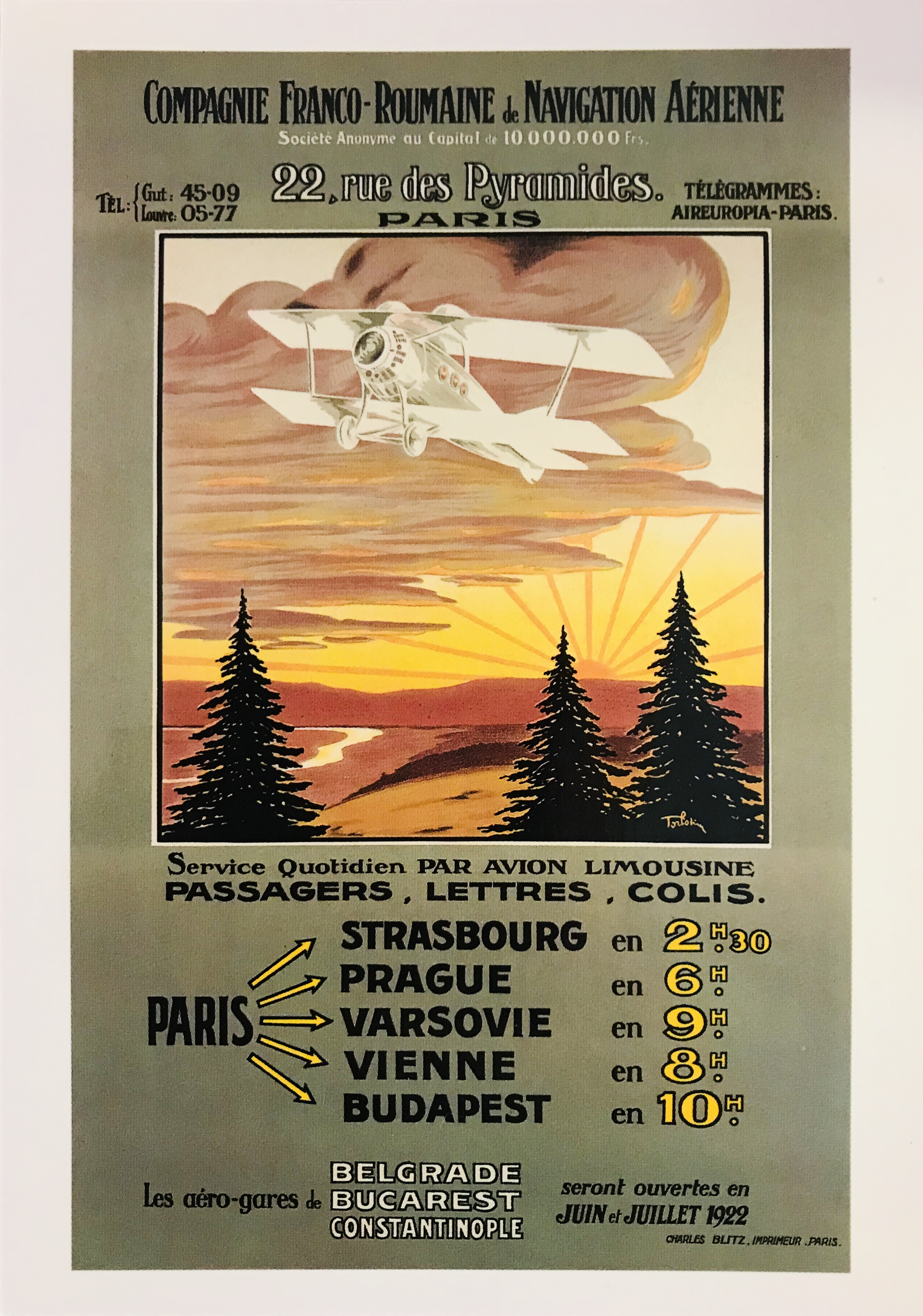

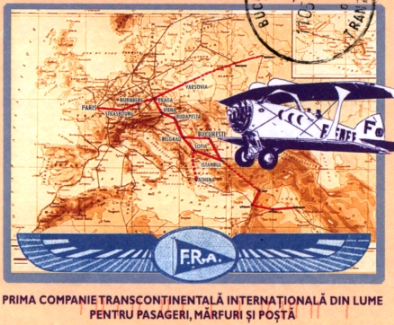

CFRNA ("The French-Romanian Company for Air Transport"; French: Compagnie franco-roumaine de navigation aérienne; Romanian: Compania franco-română de navigație aeriană) was a French–Romanian airline, founded on 1 January 1920. Its name changed on 1 January 1925 to CIDNA ("The International Air Navigation Company"; French: Compagnie internationale de navigation aérienne).

Using French-built Potez aircraft, the company provided passenger, mail and cargo transportation, by air, from Paris to Bucharest, via Strasbourg, Prague, Vienna and Budapest. As such, CFRNA was the first operative transcontinental airline in the history of aviation. The company also made the first passenger international night flight, between Belgrade and Bucharest in 1923. In 1925 CIDNA opened the first domestic Romanian route Bucharest – Galați, followed, from 24 June 1926, by an extended service to Iași and Chișinău and to Bălți.

In 1930, the Romanian arm adopted the name LARES (Liniile Aeriene Române Exploatate de Stat – Romanian Airlines Operated by the State).

The company ceased to exist when it became one of the constituting companies of Air France on 7 October 1933.

== Aircraft ==
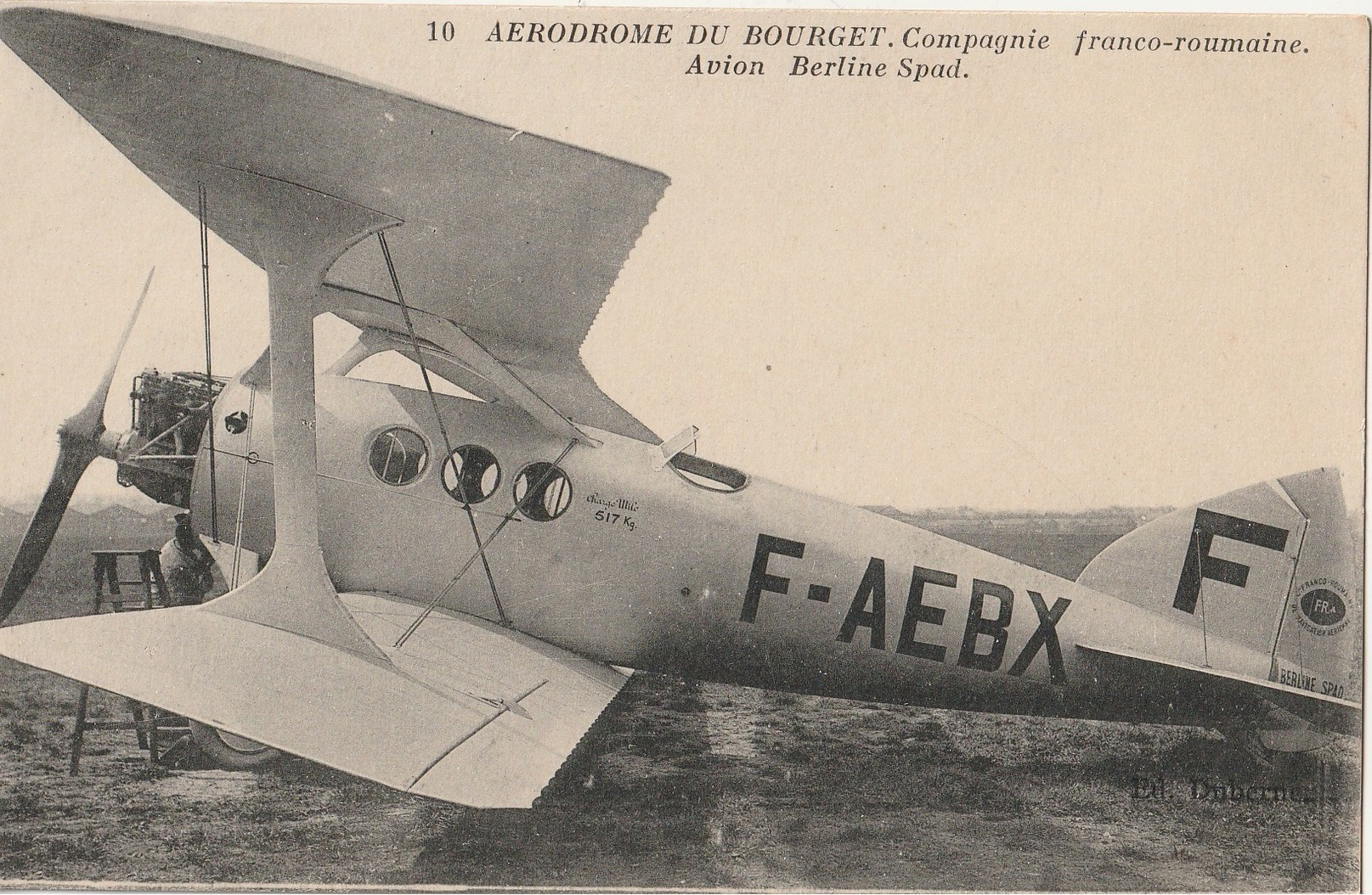
Blériot-SPAD S.33

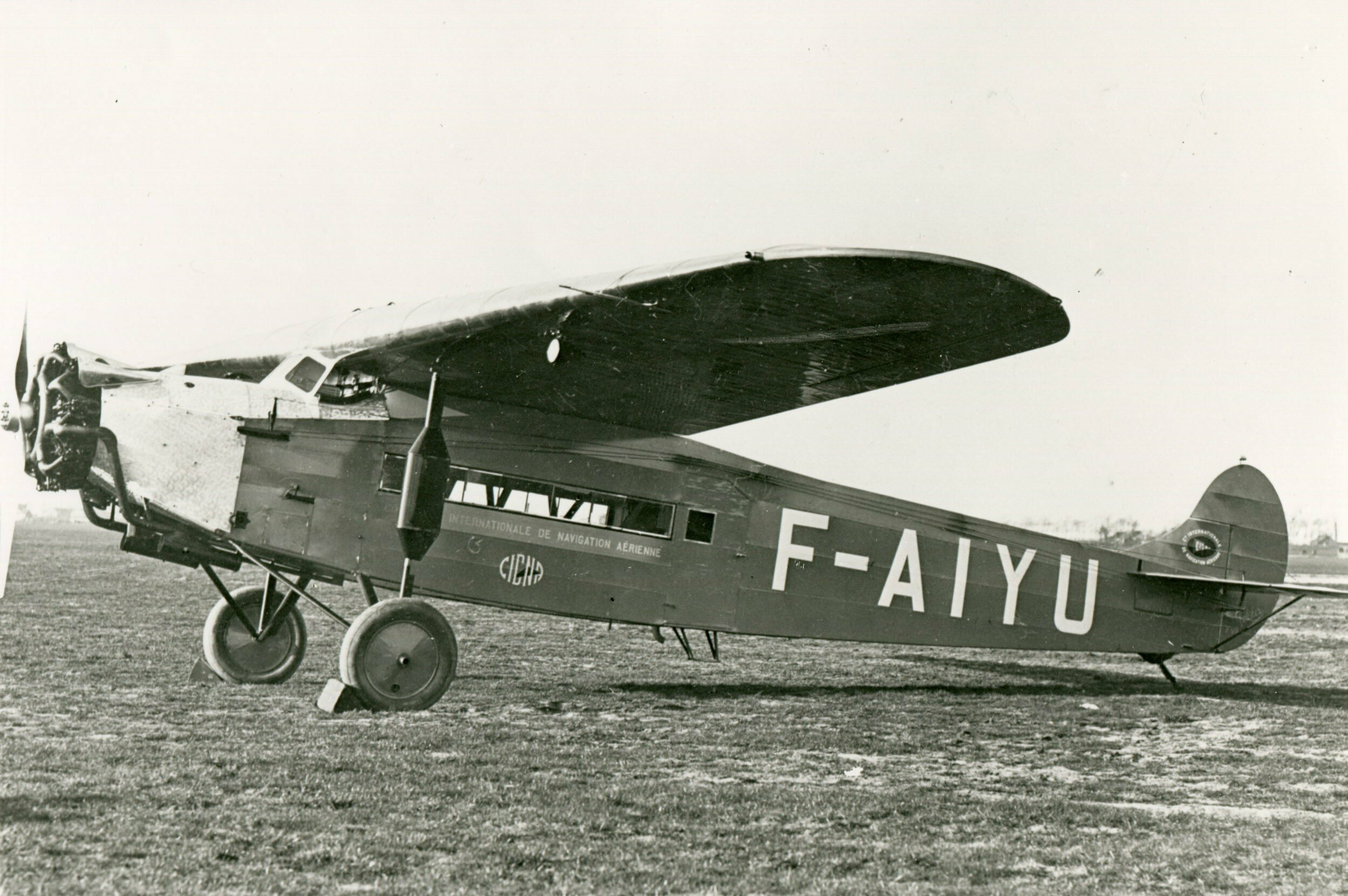
Fokker F.VII

Type	Passengers	Total number
Aero A.38	8	2
Bernard 190T	8	8
Blériot-SPAD S.33	1	5
Blériot-SPAD S.46	5	38
Blériot-SPAD S.56	4 or 6	13
Caudron C.61	8	6
Fokker F.VII	8	
Farman F.190	4	
Potez SEA VII	2	25
Potez IX	4	
Potez 29	5	1
Potez 32	4	
Salmson 2 A.2	1	
