= Blériot-SPAD S.33 =

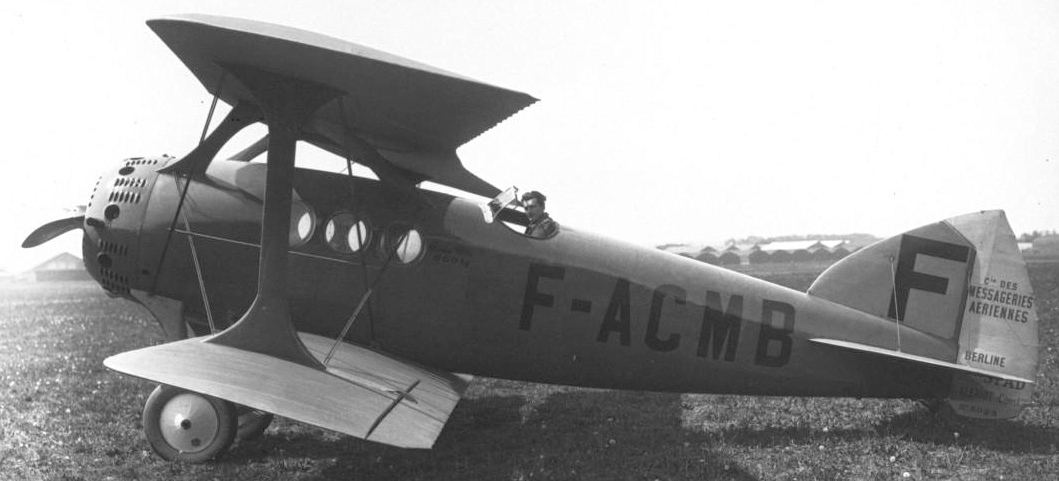

General information
- Type: Airliner
- Manufacturer: Blériot
- Primary users: Franco-Roumaine, CMA SNETA
- Number built: ca. 41

History
- First flight: 12 December 1920
- Variants: Blériot-SPAD S.46; Blériot-SPAD S.56

The Bleriot-SPAD S.33 was a small French airliner developed soon after World War I. The aircraft was a biplane of conventional configuration whose design owed much to the Blériot company's contemporary fighter designs such as the S.20. Four passengers could be accommodated in an enclosed cabin within the monocoque fuselage, and a fifth passenger could ride in the open cockpit beside the pilot. A great success, the S.33 dominated its field throughout the 1920s, initially on CMA's Paris-London route, and later on continental routes serviced by Franco-Roumaine.

One interesting development was a sole example converted by CIDNA to act as a blind-flying trainer. A set of controls was installed inside the passenger cabin, the windows of which had been blacked out.

== Variants ==
S.33
Single-engined passenger transport aircraft, powered by a 260 hp (190 kW) Salmson CM.9 radial piston engine. 41 aircraft built.
S.46
Improved version of the S.33, powered by a 370 hp (280 kW) Lorraine-Dietrich 12Da engine. 38 built and sold to the Franco-Roumaine Company.
S.48
A single S.33 temporarily re-engined in 1925, fitted with a 275 hp (205 kW) Lorraine 7M Mizar engine.
S.50
Luxury version with passenger cabin enlarged to six seats, fitted with a 300 hp (220 kW) Hispano-Suiza 8Fb engine. Three were converted from S.33s, plus two all-new aircraft.

== Operators ==
France

- Franco-Roumaine (20 aircraft)
- CMA (15 aircraft)

Belgium

- SNETA (6 aircraft)

== Accidents and incidents ==
On 16 July 1922, F-FREI, operated by Franco-Roumaine, crashed close to the Château de Hohbarr after taking off from Strasbourg. The French pilot and four British passengers were all killed. The passengers were returning from watching the 1922 French Grand Prix.

== Specifications (S.33) ==
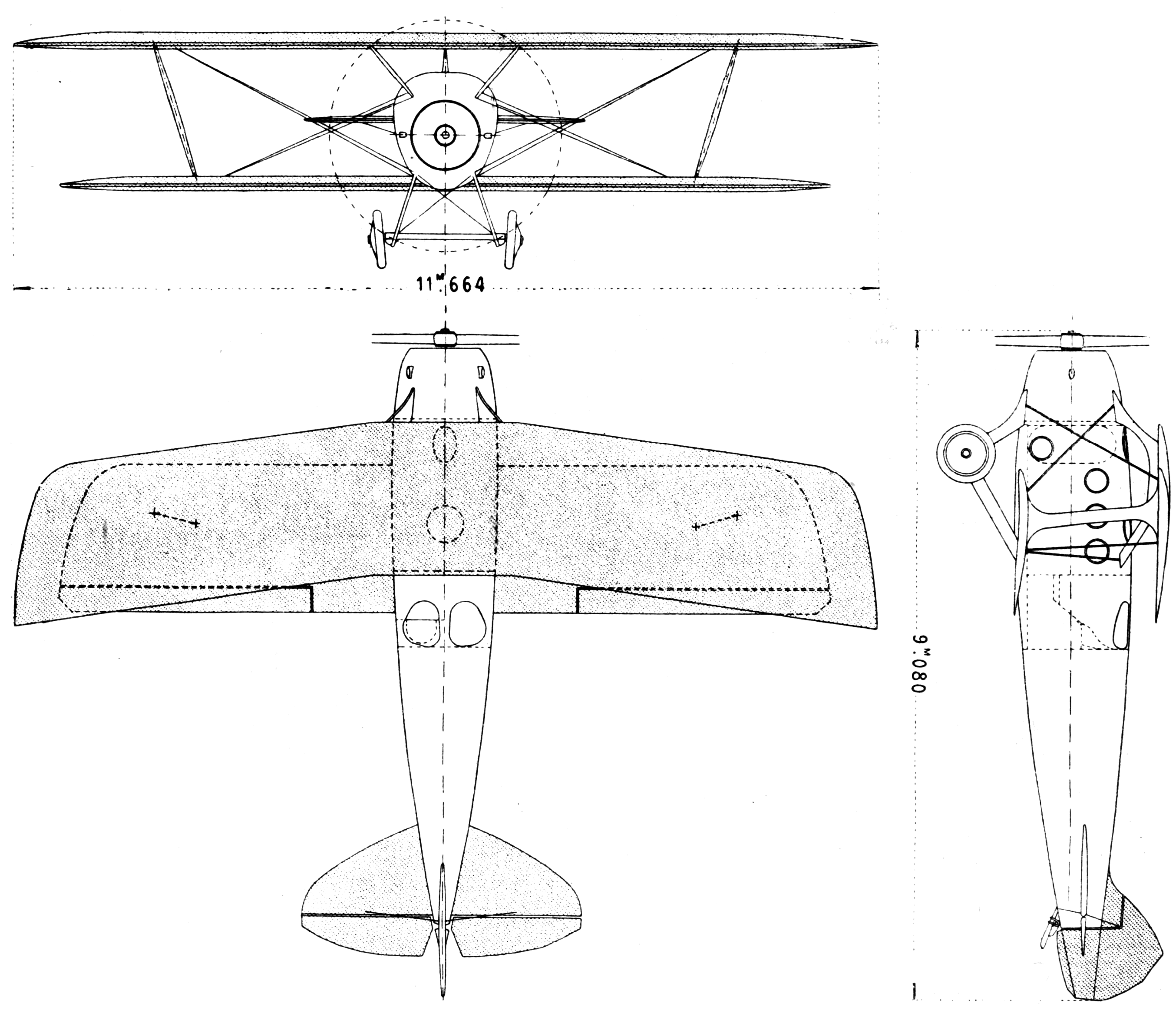
Blériot-SPAD S.33 3-view drawing from L'Aerophile June,1921

Data from Jane's all the World's Aircraft 1924, Aviafrance:SPAD S-33, Flight 7 July 1921:

General characteristics

- Crew: 1
- Capacity: 4/5 pax
- Length: 9.08 m (29 ft 9 in)
- Wingspan: 11.66 m (38 ft 3 in)
- Height: 3.3 m (10 ft 10 in)
- Wing area: 43 m^{2} (460 sq ft)
- Empty weight: 1,050 kg (2,315 lb)
- Gross weight: 1,797 kg (3,962 lb)
- Powerplant: × Salmson CM.9 9-cylinder air-cooled radial piston engine, 190 kW (260 hp)
- Propellers: 2-bladed fixed-pitch propeller

Performance

- Maximum speed: 180 km/h (110 mph, 97 kn) at 2,000 m (6,600 ft)
- Range: 1,060 km (660 mi, 570 nmi)
- Endurance: 5 hours
- Service ceiling: 4,000 m (13,000 ft)
- Time to altitude: 1,000 m (3,300 ft) in 10 minutes 5 seconds; 2,000 m (6,600 ft) in 23 minutes; 3,000 m (9,800 ft) in 45 minutes 32 seconds
- Wing loading: 46.5 kg/m^{2} (9.5 lb/sq ft)
- Power/mass: 0.0932 kW/kg (0.0567 hp/lb)

== See also ==
Related development

- S.46
- S.56
- S.66
- S.86
- S.116
- S.126
