= Blériot-SPAD S.46 =

1921 small French airliner

S.46
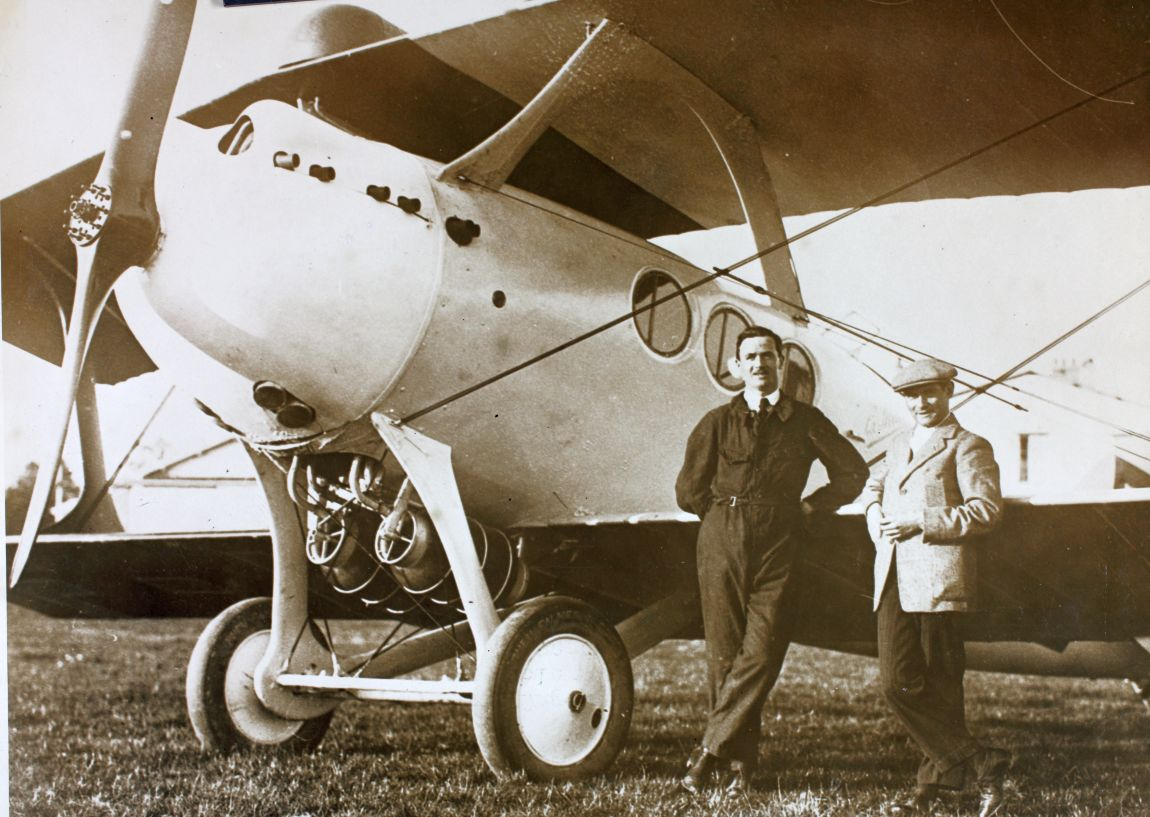

General information
- Type: Airliner
- Manufacturer: Blériot
- Primary user: Franco-Roumaine
- Number built: ca. 40

History
- First flight: June 16, 1921
- Developed from: Blériot-SPAD S.33

The Blériot-SPAD S.46 was a small French airliner of the 1920s, developed from the Blériot-SPAD S.33. Like its predecessor, it was a conventional biplane that seated four passengers in an enclosed cabin while the pilot and occasionally a fifth passenger rode in an open cockpit. The S.46 had a redesigned wing of longer span and a far more powerful engine. The type was employed by Franco-Roumaine, which purchased 38 out of the 40 examples produced for use on their continental European routes.

== Development ==
In 1922 one of the S.46s, modified to use a more powerful 336 kW (451 hp) Lorraine 12E Courlis W-12 engine was redesignated S.86. In 1929 this was changed to a Hispano-Suiza engine in the same power range and redesignated S.126.

In 1925, the surviving 34 Franco-Roumaine aircraft were recalled to Blériot where they underwent remanufacture to incorporate various refinements. These refurbished aircraft were redesignated S.66. One of these aircraft was subsequently also modified to use a more powerful 336 kW (451 hp) Lorraine 12E Courlis W-12 engine and redesignated S.116.

== Variants ==
S.46
Single-engined passenger airliner, powered by a single 276 kW (370 hp) Lorraine-Dietrich 12Da V-12 engine.
S.66
34 remanufactured S.46s.
S.86
One S.46 was modified when it was fitted with the more powerful 336 kW (451 hp) Lorraine 12E Courlis W-12 engine.
S.116
One S.66 was modified with the more powerful 336 kW (451 hp) Renault 12Ja V-12 engine
S.126
The S.86 was further modified again, when it was fitted with a 336 kW (451 hp) Hispano-Suiza 12Ha V-12 engine.

== Operators ==
France

- Franco-Roumaine (38 aircraft)

== Specifications (S.46) ==
Data from European Transport Aircraft since 1910

General characteristics

- Crew: 1 pilot
- Capacity: 5 passengers
- Length: 9.05 m (29 ft 8 in)
- Wingspan: 12.64 m (41 ft 6 in)
- Height: 3.18 m (10 ft 5 in)
- Wing area: 46.28 m^{2} (498.2 sq ft)
- Empty weight: 1,300–1,417 kg (2,866–3,124 lb)
- Gross weight: 2,105–2,300 kg (4,641–5,071 lb)
- Powerplant: 1 × Lorraine-Dietrich 12Da V-12 water-cooled piston engine, 280 kW (370 hp)

Performance

- Maximum speed: 214 km/h (133 mph, 116 kn)
- Cruise speed: 165 km/h (103 mph, 89 kn)
- Range: 800 km (500 mi, 430 nmi)
- Service ceiling: 5,050 m (16,570 ft)
- Time to altitude: 12 min 10 s to 2,000 m (6,600 ft)

== See also ==
Related development

- S.33
- S.50
- S.56
