= Airliner =

Airplane transporting passengers and cargo

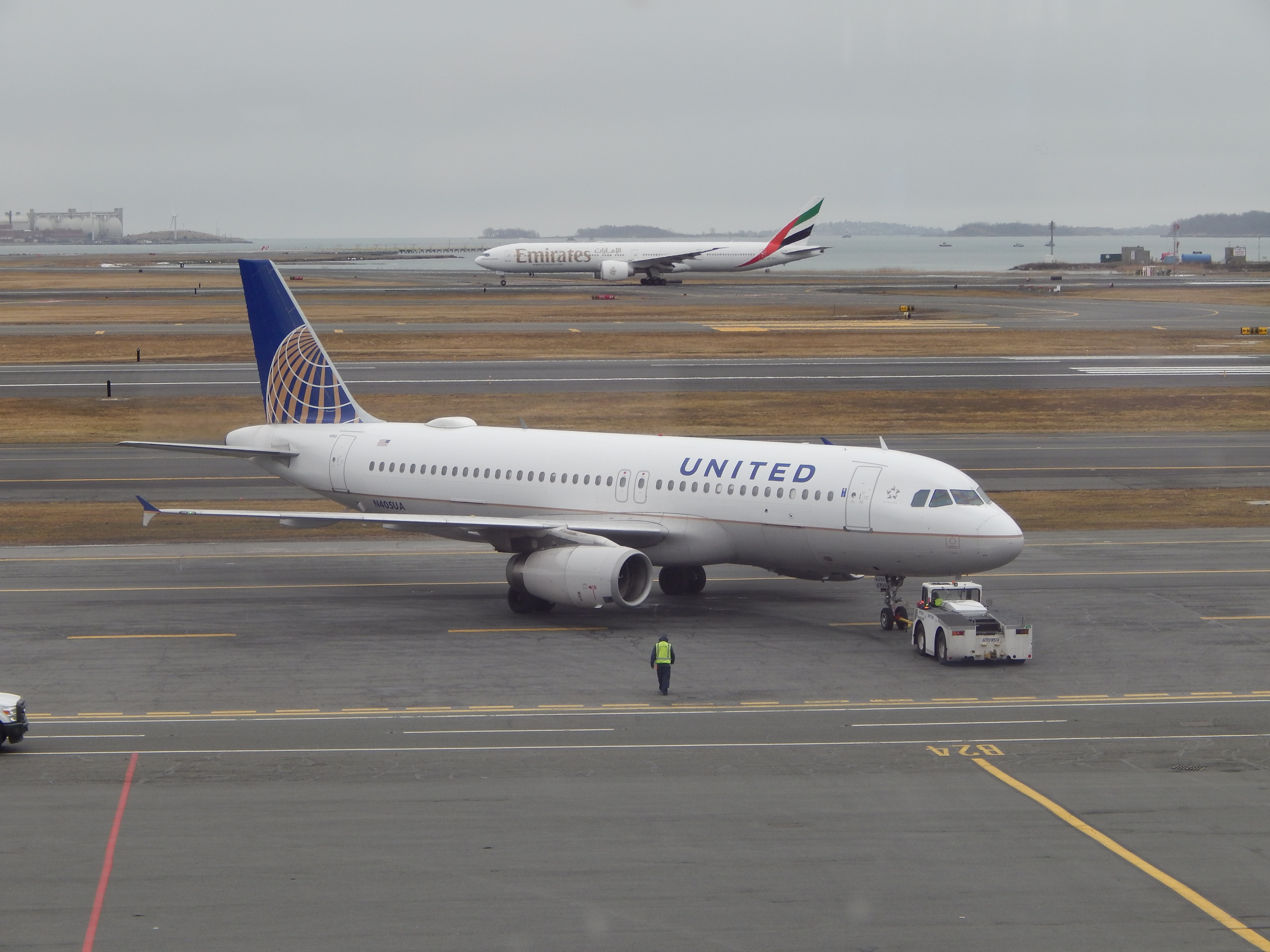
A United Airlines Airbus A320 (foreground) and an Emirates Boeing 777-300ER (background) at Logan International Airport in March 2017, two of the world's most widely used airliners.

An airliner is a type of airplane for transporting passengers and air cargo. Such aircraft are most often operated by airlines. The modern and most common variant of the airliner is a jet powered aircraft with a long, tube-shaped fuselage. The largest of them are wide-body jets which are also called twin-aisle because they generally have two separate aisles running from the front to the back of the passenger cabin. These are usually used for long-haul flights between airline hubs and major cities. A smaller, more common class of airliners is the narrow-body or single-aisle. These are generally used for short to medium-distance flights with fewer passengers than their wide-body counterparts.

Regional airliners typically seat fewer than 100 passengers and may be powered by turbofans or turboprops. These airliners are the non-mainline counterparts to the larger aircraft operated by the major carriers, legacy carriers, and flag carriers, and are used to feed traffic into the large airline hubs. These regional routes then form the spokes of a hub-and-spoke air transport model.

The lightest aircraft are short-haul regional feeder airliner type aircraft that carry a small number of passengers are called commuter aircraft, commuterliners, feederliners, and air taxis, depending on their size, engines, how they are marketed, region of the world, and seating configurations. The Beechcraft 1900, for example, has only 19 seats.

== History ==
=== Emergence ===
When the Wright brothers made the world's first sustained heavier-than-air flight, they laid the foundation for what would become a major transport industry. Their flight, performed in the Wright Flyer during 1903, was just 11 years before what is often defined as the world's first airliner. By the 1960s, airliners had expanded capabilities, making a significant impact on global society, economics, and politics.

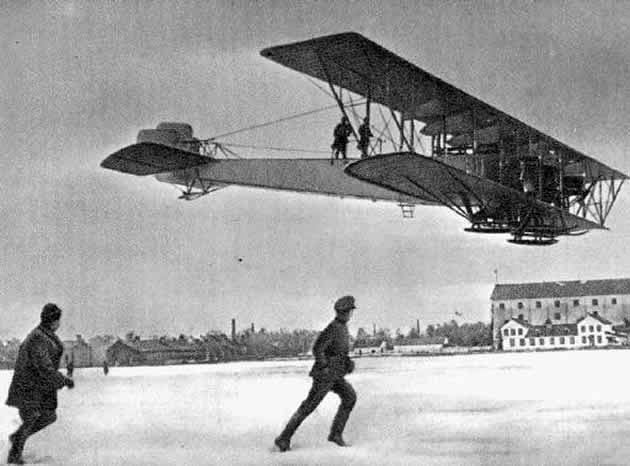
Sikorsky Ilya Muromets

During 1913, Igor Sikorsky developed the first large multi-engine airplane, the Russky Vityaz. This aircraft was subsequently refined into the more practical Ilya Muromets, being furnished with dual controls for a pilot and copilot and a comfortable cabin with a lavatory, cabin heating and lighting. This large four-engine biplane was further adapted into an early bomber aircraft, preceding subsequent transport and bomber aircraft. It first flew on 10 December 1913 and took off for its first demonstration flight with 16 passengers aboard on 25 February 1914. However, it was never used as a commercial airliner due to the onset of the First World War which led to military applications being prioritised.

=== Interwar period ===
In 1919, shortly after the end of the First World War, large numbers of ex-military aircraft flooded the market. One such aircraft was the French Farman F.60 Goliath, which had originally been designed as a long-range heavy bomber; a number were converted for commercial use into passenger airliners starting in 1919, being able to accommodate a maximum of 14 seated passengers. Around 60 were built. Initially, several publicity flights were made, including one on 8 February 1919, when the Goliath flew 12 passengers from Toussus-le-Noble to RAF Kenley, near Croydon, despite having no permission from the British authorities to land. Dozens of early airlines subsequently procured the type. One high-profile flight, made on 11 August 1919, involved an F.60 flying eight passengers and a ton of supplies from Paris via Casablanca and Mogador to Koufa, 180 km (110 mi) north of Saint-Louis, Senegal, flying more than 4,500 km (2,800 mi).

Another important airliner built in 1919 was the Airco DH.16; a redesigned Airco DH.9A with a wider fuselage to accommodate an enclosed cabin seating four passengers, plus pilot in an open cockpit. In March 1919, the prototype first flew at Hendon Aerodrome. Nine aircraft were built, all but one being delivered to the nascent airline, Aircraft Transport and Travel, which used the first aircraft for pleasure flying, and on 25 August 1919, it inaugurated the first scheduled international airline service from London to Paris. One aircraft was sold to the River Plate Aviation Company in Argentina, to operate a cross-river service between Buenos Aires and Montevideo. Meanwhile, the competing Vickers converted its successful First World War era bomber, the Vickers Vimy, into a civilian version, the Vimy Commercial. It was redesigned with a larger-diameter fuselage (largely of spruce plywood), and first flew from the Joyce Green airfield in Kent on 13 April 1919.

The world's first all-metal transport aircraft was the Junkers F.13, which also made its first flight in 1919. Junkers marketed the aircraft towards business travellers and commercial operators, and European entrepreneurs bought examples for their private use and business trips. Over 300 Junkers F 13s were built between 1919 and 1932. The Dutch Fokker company produced the Fokker F.II, then the enlarged F.III. These were used by the Dutch airline KLM, including on its Amsterdam-London service in 1921. A relatively reliable aircraft for the era, the Fokkers were flying to destinations across Europe, including Bremen, Brussels, Hamburg, and Paris.

The Handley Page company in Britain produced the Handley Page Type W, its first civil transport aircraft. It housed two crew in an open cockpit and 15 passengers in an enclosed cabin. Powered by two 450 hp (340 kW) Napier Lion engines, the prototype first flew on 4 December 1919, shortly after it was displayed at the 1919 Paris Air Show at Le Bourget. It was ordered by the Belgian firm Sabena, a further ten Type Ws were produced under license in Belgium by SABCA. In 1921 the Air Ministry ordered three aircraft, built as the W.8b, for use by Handley Page Transport, and later by Imperial Airways, on services to Paris and Brussels.

In France, the Bleriot-SPAD S.33 was introduced during the early 1920s. It was commercially successful, initially serving the Paris-London route, and later on continental routes. The enclosed cabin could carry four passengers with an extra seat in the cockpit. It was further developed into the Blériot-SPAD S.46. Throughout the 1920s, companies in Britain and France were at the forefront of the civil airliner industry.

By 1921, the capacity of airliners needed to be increased to achieve more favourable economics. The English company de Havilland, built the 10-passenger DH.29 monoplane, while starting work on the design of the DH.32, an eight-seater biplane with a more economical but less powerful Rolls-Royce Eagle engine. For more capacity, DH.32 development was replaced by the DH.34 biplane, accommodating 10 passengers. A commercially successful aircraft, Daimler Airway ordered a batch of nine.

The Ford Trimotor had two engines mounted on the wings and one in the nose, and a slabsided body, it carried eight passengers and was produced from 1925 to 1933. It was an important early airliner in America. It was used by the predecessor to Trans World Airlines, and by other airlines long after production ceased. The Trimotor helped to popularise numerous aspects of modern aviation infrastructure, including paved runways, passenger terminals, hangars, airmail, and radio navigation. Pan Am opened up transoceanic service in the late 1920s and early 1930s, based on a series of large seaplanes – the Sikorsky S-38 through Sikorsky S-42.

By the 1930s, the airliner industry had matured and large consolidated national airlines were established with regular international services that spanned the globe, including Imperial Airways in Britain, Lufthansa in Germany, KLM in the Netherlands, and United Airlines in America. Multi-engined aircraft were now capable of transporting dozens of passengers in comfort.

During the 1930s, the British de Havilland Dragon emerged as a short-haul, low-capacity airliner. Its relatively simple design could carry six passengers, each with 45 lb (20 kg) of luggage, on the London-Paris route on a fuel consumption of 13 gal (49 L) per hour. The DH.84 Dragon entered worldwide service. During early August 1934, one performed the first non-stop flight between the Canadian mainland and Britain in 30 hours 55 minutes, although the intended destination had originally been Baghdad in Iraq. British production of the Dragon ended in favour of the de Havilland Dragon Rapide, a faster and more comfortable successor.

By November 1934, series production of the Dragon Rapide had commenced. De Havilland invested into advanced features including elongated rear windows, cabin heating, thickened wing tips, and a strengthened airframe for a higher gross weight of 5,500 lb (2,500 kg). Later aircraft were amongst the first airliners to be fitted with flaps for improved landing performance, along with downwards-facing recognition light and metal propellers, which were often retrofitted to older aircraft. It was also used in military roles; civil Dragon Rapides were impressed into military service during the Second World War.

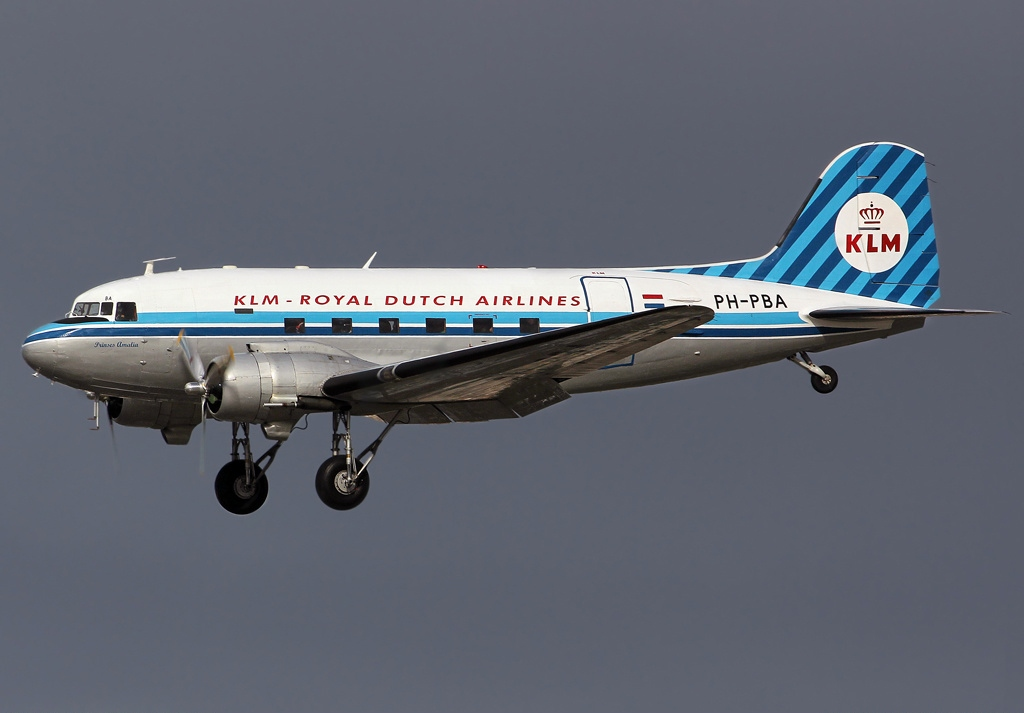
The Douglas DC-3 appeared in 1935

Metal airliners came into service in the 1930s. In the United States, the Boeing 247, and the 14-passenger Douglas DC-2, flew during the first half of the decade, while the more powerful, faster, 21–32 passenger Douglas DC-3 first appeared in 1935. DC-3s were produced in quantity for the Second World War and were sold as surplus afterward, becoming widespread within the commercial sector. It was one of first airliners to be profitable without the support of postal or government subsidies.

Long-haul flights were expanded during the 1930s as Pan American Airways and Imperial Airways competed on transatlantic travel using fleets of flying boats, such as the British Short Empire and the American Boeing 314. Imperial Airways' order for 28 Empire flying boats was viewed by some as a bold gamble. At the time, flying boats were the only practical means of building aircraft of such size and weight as land-based aircraft would have unfeasibly poor field performance. One Boeing 314, registration NC18602, became the first commercial plane to circumnavigate the globe during December 1941 and January 1942.

=== The postwar era ===
==== United Kingdom ====
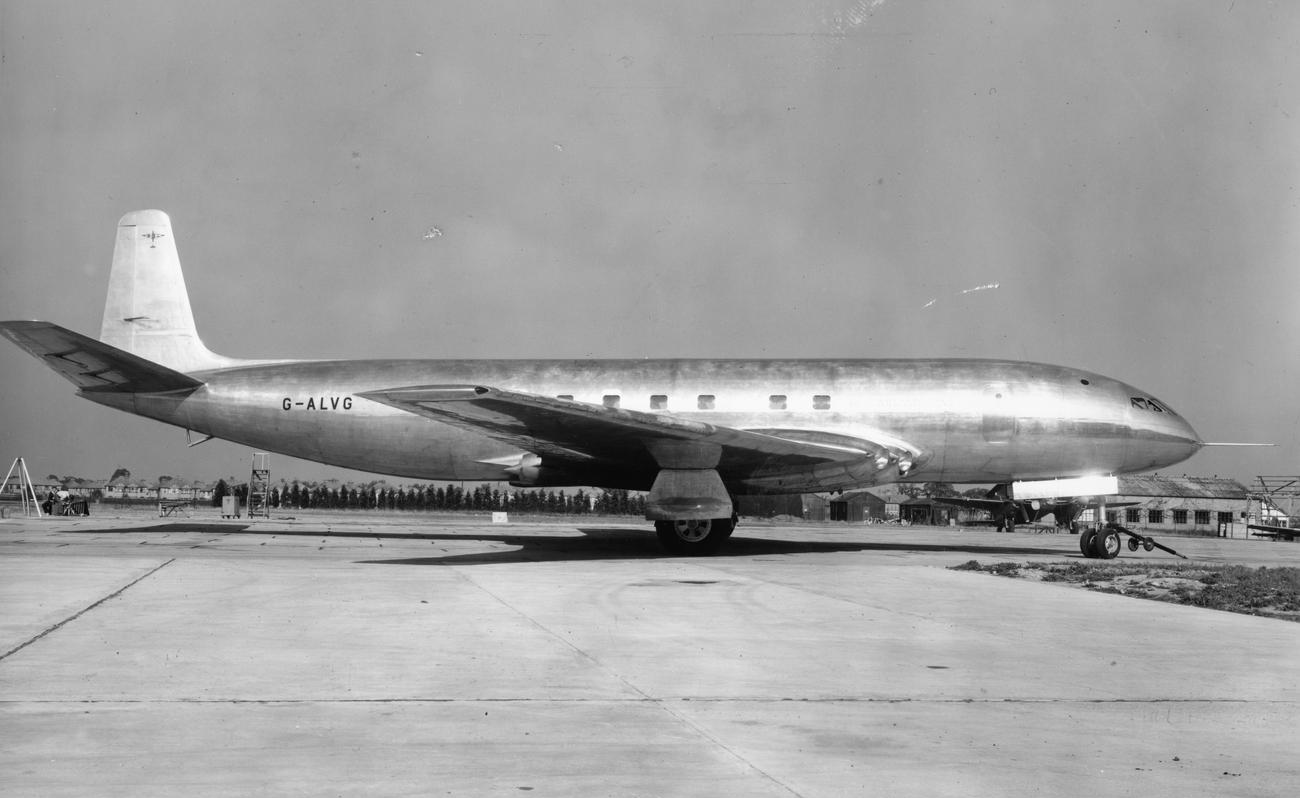
Prototype of the de Havilland Comet in 1949

In the United Kingdom, the Brabazon Committee was formed in 1942 under John Moore-Brabazon, 1st Baron Brabazon of Tara to forecast advances in aviation technology and the air transport needs of the postwar British Empire (in South Asia, Africa, and the Near and Far East) and Commonwealth (Australia, Canada, New Zealand). For British use, multi-engine aircraft types were allegedly split between the US for military transport aircraft and the UK for heavy bombers. That such a policy was suggested or implemented have been disputed, at least by Sir Peter Masefield. British aircraft manufacturers were tied up to fulfill military requirements, and had no free capacity to address other matters though the war.

The committee final report pushed four designs for the state-owned airlines British Overseas Airways Corporation (BOAC) and later British European Airways (BEA): three piston-powered aircraft of varying sizes, and a jet-powered 100-seat design at the request of Geoffrey de Havilland, involved in the first jet fighters development.

After a brief contest, the Type I design was given to the Bristol Aeroplane Company, building on a "100 ton bomber" submission. This evolved into the Bristol Brabazon but this project folded in 1951 as BOAC lost interest and the first aircraft needed a costly wing re-design to accommodate the Bristol Proteus engine.

The Type II was split between the de Havilland Dove and Airspeed Ambassador conventional piston designs, and the Vickers model powered by newly developed turboprops: first flown in 1948, the VC.2 Viceroy was the first turboprop design to enter service; a commercial success with 445 Viscounts built. The Type III requirement led to the conventional Avro Tudor and the more ambitious Bristol Britannia, although both aircraft suffered protracted developments, with the latter entering service with BOAC in February 1957, over seven years following its order.

The jet-powered Type IV became the de Havilland Comet in 1949. It featured an aerodynamically clean design with four de Havilland Ghost turbojet engines buried in the wings, a pressurised fuselage, and large square windows. On 2 May 1952, the Comet took off on the world's first jetliner flight carrying fare-paying passengers and simultaneously inaugurated scheduled service between London and Johannesburg. However, roughly one year after introduction, three Comets broke up mid-flight due to airframe metal fatigue, not well understood at the time. The Comet was grounded and tested to discover the cause, while rival manufacturers heeded the lessons learned while developing their own aircraft. The improved Comet 2 and the prototype Comet 3 culminated in the redesigned Comet 4 series which debuted in 1958 and had a productive career over 30 years, but sales never fully recovered.

By the 1960s, the UK had lost the airliner market to the US due to the Comet disaster and a smaller domestic market, not regained by later designs like the BAC 1-11, Vickers VC10, and Hawker Siddeley Trident. The STAC committee was formed to consider supersonic designs and worked with Bristol to create the Bristol 223, a 100-passenger transatlantic airliner. The effort was later merged with similar efforts in France to create the Concorde supersonic airliner to share the cost.

==== United States ====
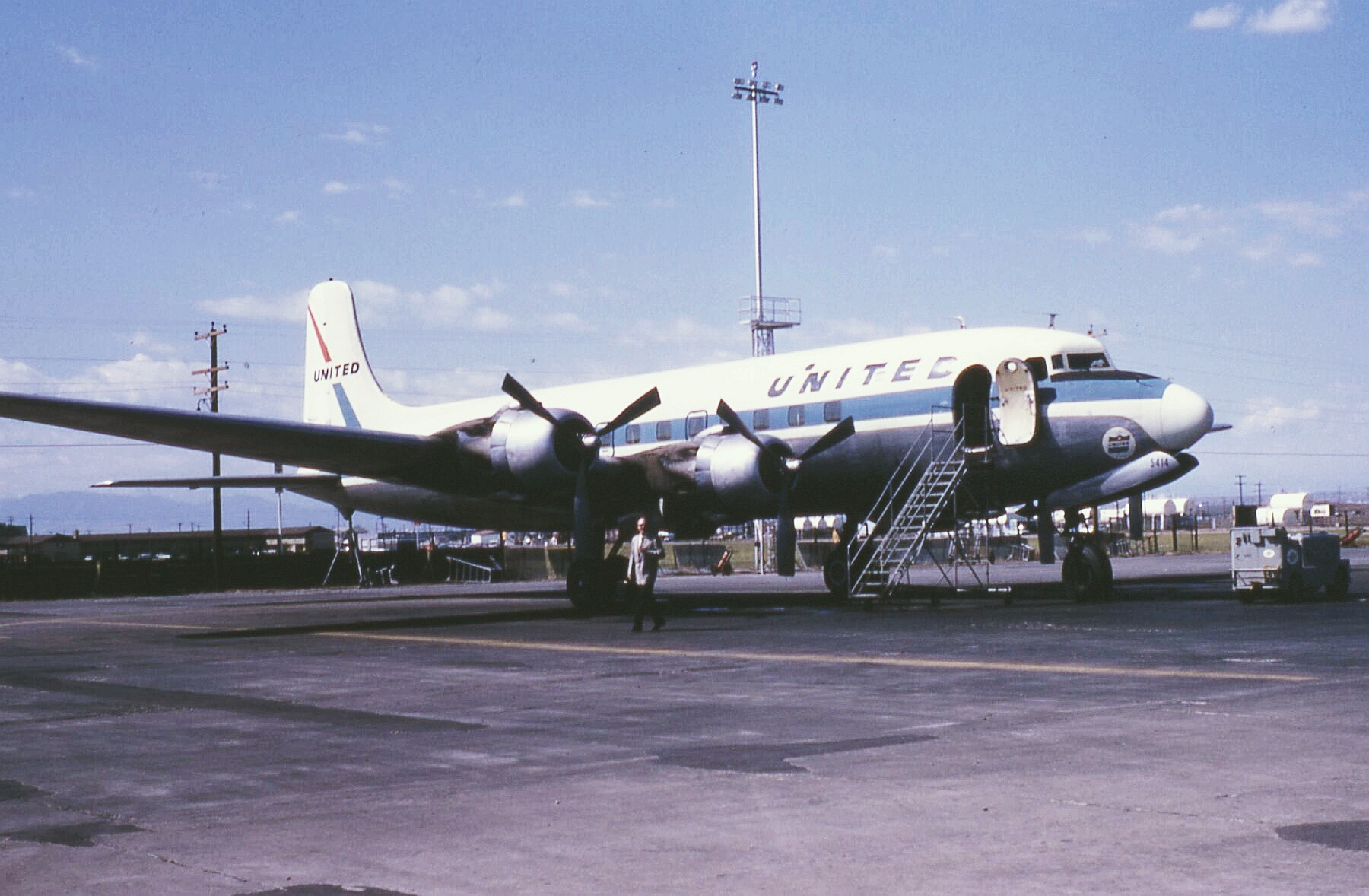
United Airlines DC-6, Stapleton Airport, Denver, September 1966

The first batch of the Douglas DC-4s went to the U.S. Army and Air Forces, and was named the C-54 Skymaster. Some ex-military DC-6s were later converted into airliners, with both passenger and cargo versions flooding the market shortly after the war's end. Douglas also developed a pressurized version of the DC-4, which it designated the Douglas DC-6. Rival company Lockheed produced the Constellation, a triple-tailed aircraft with a wider fuselage than the DC-4.

The Boeing 377 Stratocruiser was derived from the C-97 Stratofreighter. It had a double deck and a pressurized fuselage.

Convair produced the Convair 240, a 40-person pressurized airplane; 566 examples flew. Convair later developed the Convair 340, which was slightly larger and could accommodate between 44 and 52 passengers, of which 311 were produced. The firm also commenced work on the Convair 37, a relatively large double-deck airliner that would have served transcontinental routes; however, the project was abandoned due to a lack of customer demand and its high development costs.

Rival planes include the Martin 2-0-2 and Martin 4-0-4, but the 2-0-2 had safety concerns and was unpressurized, while the 4-0-4 only sold around 100 units.

During the postwar years, engines became much larger and more powerful, and safety features such as deicing, navigation, and weather information were added to the planes. American planes were allegedly more comfortable and had superior flight decks than those produced in Europe.

==== France ====
In 1936, the French Air Ministry requested transatlantic flying boats that could hold at least 40 passengers, leading to three Latécoère 631s introduced by Air France in July 1947. However, two crashed and the third was removed from service over safety concerns. The SNCASE Languedoc was the first French post-war airliner. Accommodating up to 44 seats, 40 aircraft were completed for Air France between October 1945 and April 1948. Air France withdrew the last Languedoc from its domestic routes in 1954, being replaced by later designs. First flying in February 1949, the four-engined Breguet Deux-Ponts was a double-decker transport for passengers and cargo. Air France used it on its busiest routes, including from Paris to the Mediterranean area and to London.

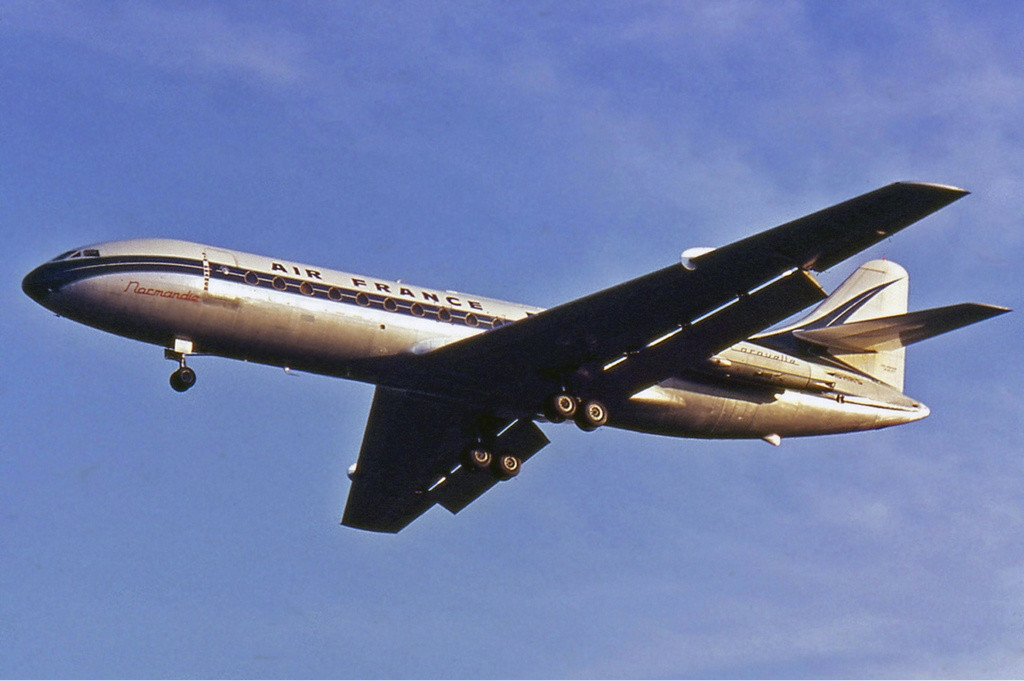
A Sud-Aviation Caravelle

The Sud-Aviation Caravelle was developed during the late 1950s as the first short range jet airliner. The nose and cockpit layout were licensed from the de Havilland Comet, along with some fuselage elements. Entering service in mid 1959, 172 Caravelles had been sold within four years and six versions were in production by 1963. Sud Aviation then focused its design team on a Caravelle successor.

The Super-Caravelle was a supersonic transport project of similar size and range to the Caravelle. It was merged with the similar Bristol Aeroplane Company project into the Anglo-French Concorde. The Concorde entered service in January 1967 as the second and last commercial supersonic transport, after large overruns and delays, costing £1.3 billion. All subsequent French airliner efforts were part of the Airbus pan-European initiative.

==== USSR ====
Soon after the war, most of the Soviet fleet of airliners consisted of DC-3s or Lisunov Li-2s. These planes were in desperate need of replacement, and in 1946, the Ilyushin Il-12 made its first flight. The Il-12 was very similar in design to American Convair 240, except was unpressurized. In 1953, the Ilyushin Il-14 made its first flight, and this version was equipped with much more powerful engines. The main contribution that the Soviets made in regards to airliners was the Antonov An-2. This plane is a biplane, unlike most of the other airliners, and sold more units than any other transport plane.

== Types ==
=== Narrow-body airliners ===
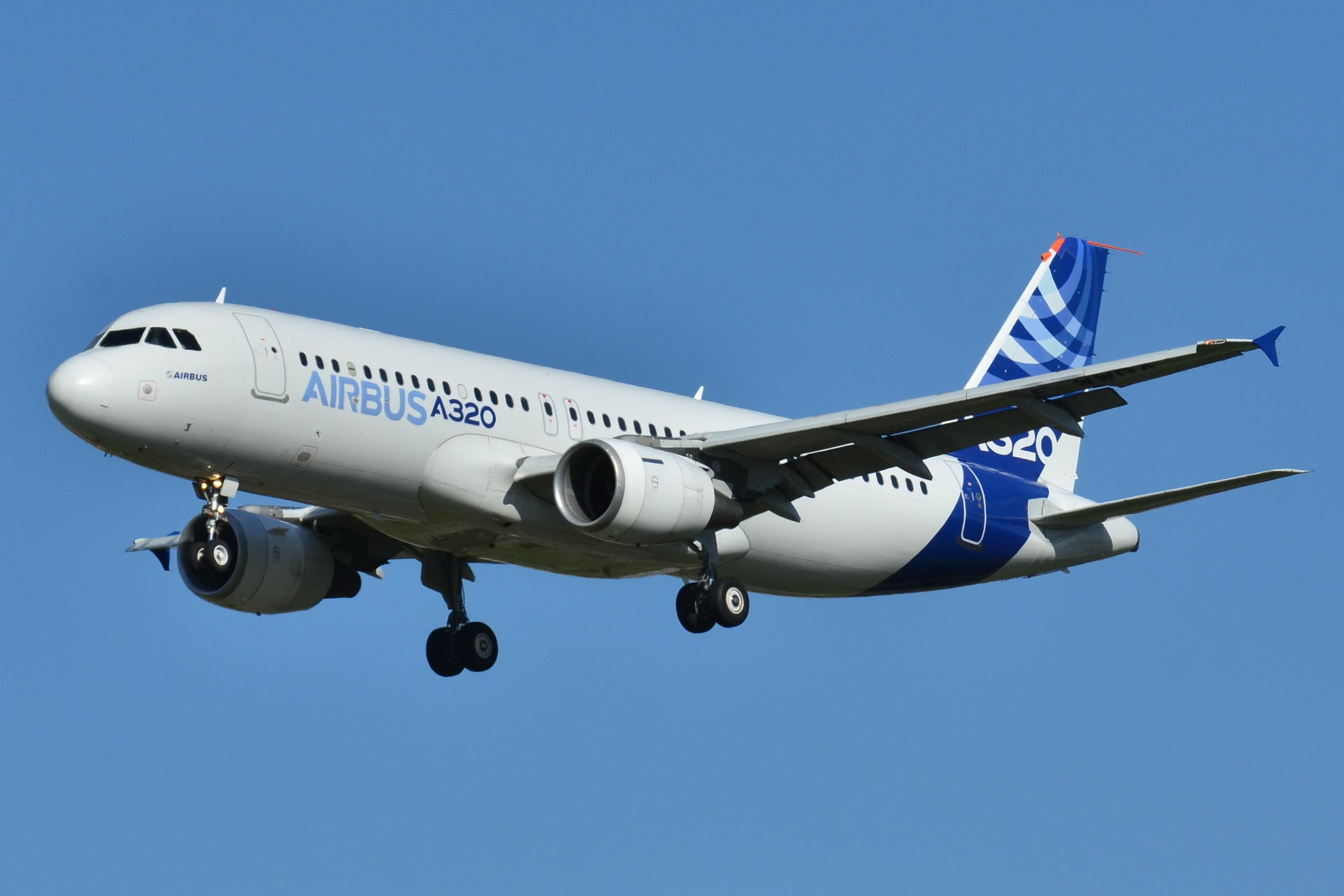
The Airbus A320 family is the highest selling and most-produced narrow-body aircraft

The narrow-body era began with early pioneering designs like the British De Havilland Comet. The United Kingdom followed this up with successful regional and long-haul platforms, namely the short-range BAC One-Eleven and the distinctively configured, four-engined Vickers VC10. However, market dominance quickly shifted to American manufacturers, led by iconic aircraft like the Boeing 707, Boeing 727, and Boeing 737 families, alongside competitors such as the Douglas DC-8 and DC-9. In later decades, the European consortium Airbus challenged this dominance with its highly successful A320 family, while Russian developers introduced their own mainline narrow-bodies, including the Tupolev Tu-134 and Tu-154.

The most common airliners are the narrow-body aircraft, or single-aisles. The earliest jet airliners were narrowbodies: the initial de Havilland Comet, the Boeing 707 and its competitor the Douglas DC-8. They were followed by smaller models : the Douglas DC-9 and its MD-80/MD-90/Boeing 717 derivatives; the Boeing 727, 737 and 757 using the 707 cabin cross-section; or the Tupolev Tu-154, Ilyushin Il-18, and the Ilyushin Il-62.

Currently produced narrow-body airliners include the Airbus A220, A320 family, Boeing 737, Embraer E-Jet family and Comac C919, generally used for medium-haul flights with 100 to 240 passengers. They could be joined by the in-development Irkut MC-21.

=== Wide-body airliners ===
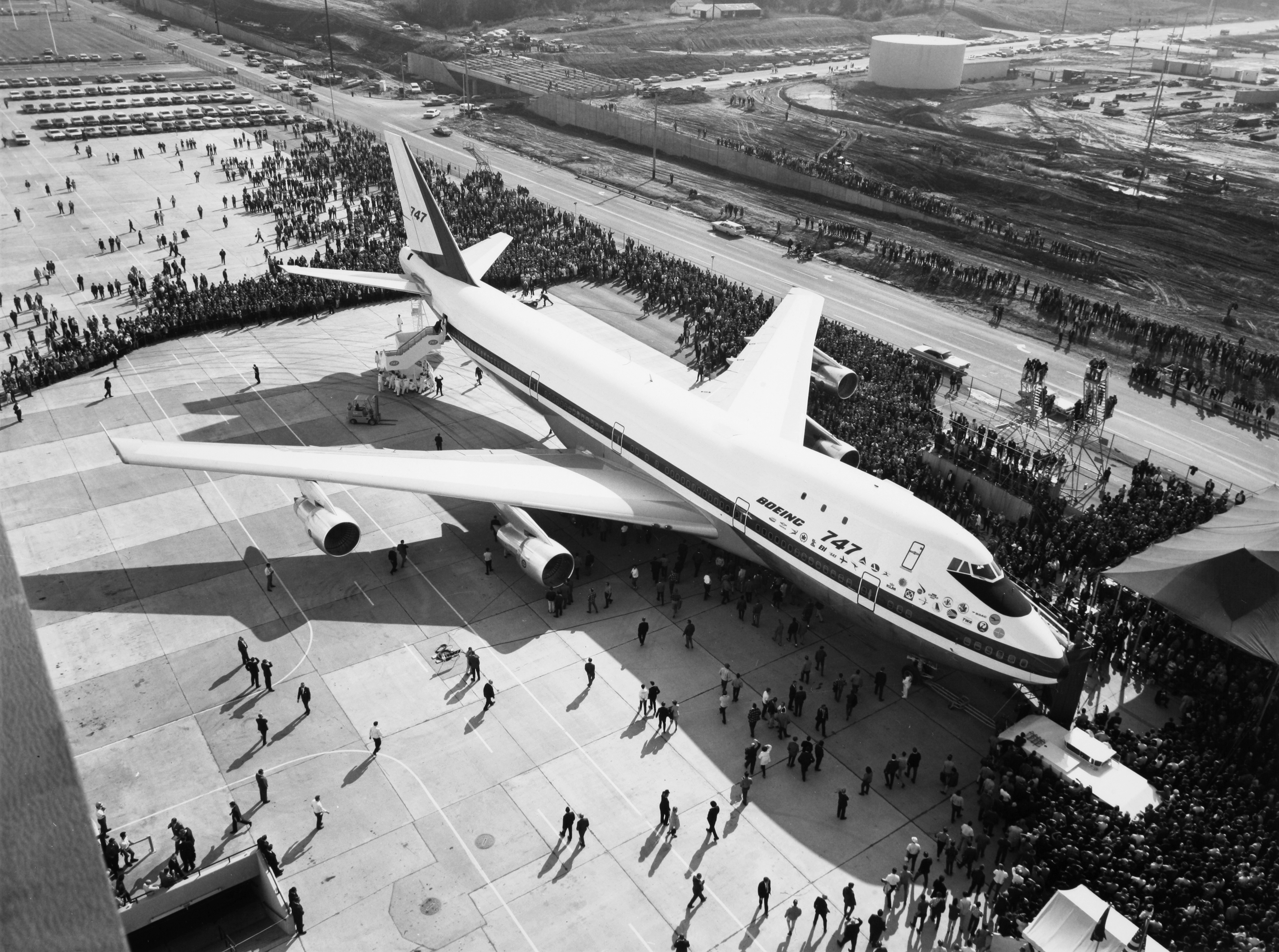
The first wide-body aircraft, the Boeing 747, rolled out in September 1968

The larger wide-body aircraft, or twin-aisle as they have two separate aisles in the cabin, are used for long-haul flights. The first was the Boeing 747 quadjet, followed by the trijets: the Lockheed L-1011 and the Douglas DC-10, then its MD-11 stretch. Then other quadjets were introduced: the Ilyushin Il-86 and Il-96, the Airbus A340 and the double-deck A380. Twinjets were also put into service: the Airbus A300/A310, A330 and A350; the 767, 777 and 787.

=== Regional aircraft ===
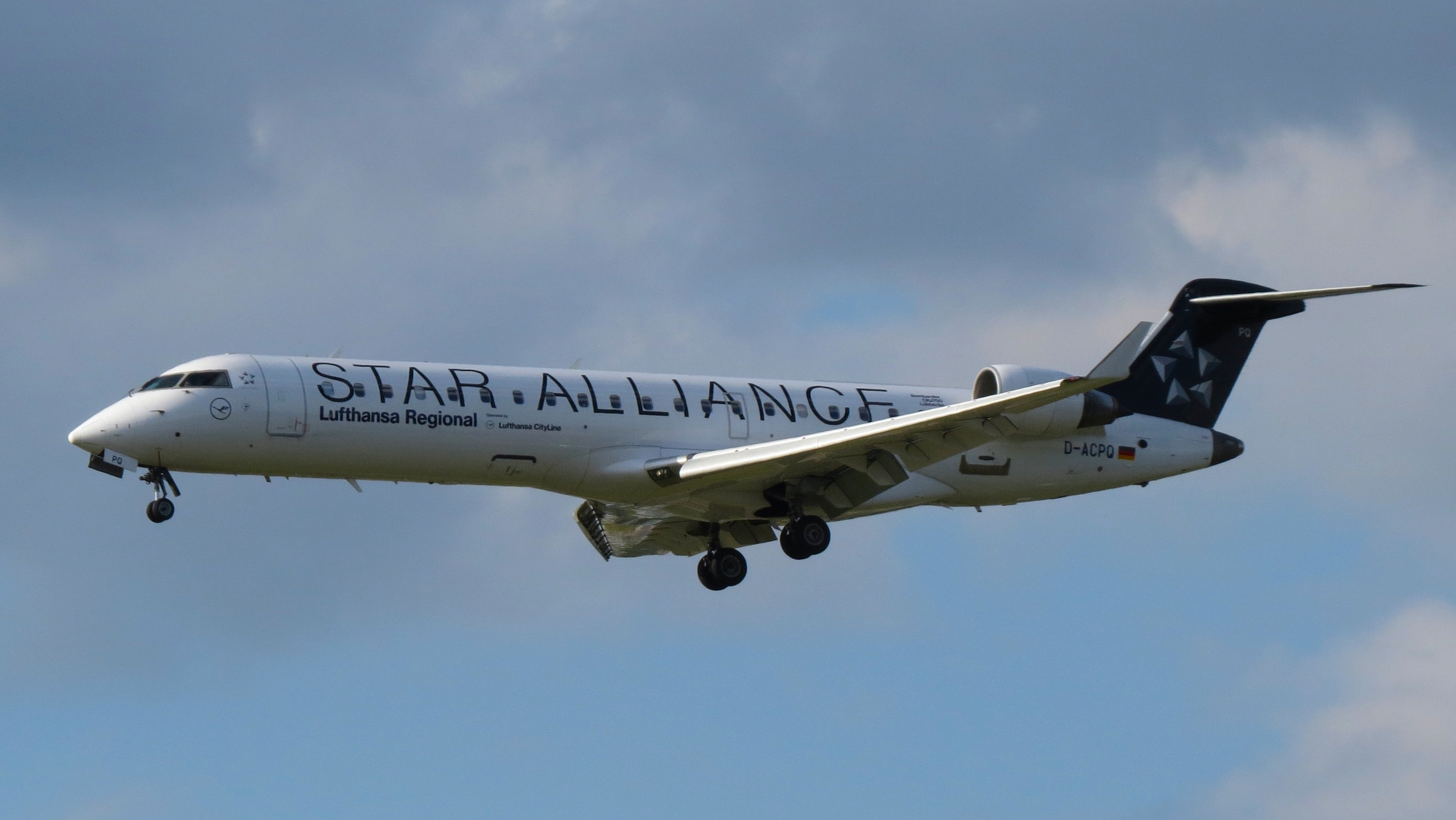
Over 1,800 Bombardier CRJs have been delivered

Regional airliners seat fewer than 100 passengers. These smaller aircraft are often used to feed traffic at large airline hubs to larger aircraft operated by the major mainline carriers, legacy carriers, or flag carriers; often sharing the same livery. Regional jets include the British Aerospace 146, the Bombardier CRJ100/200 and Bombardier CRJ700 series, or the Embraer ERJ family. Currently produced turboprop regional airliners include the Dash-8 series, and the ATR 42/72.

=== Commuter aircraft ===
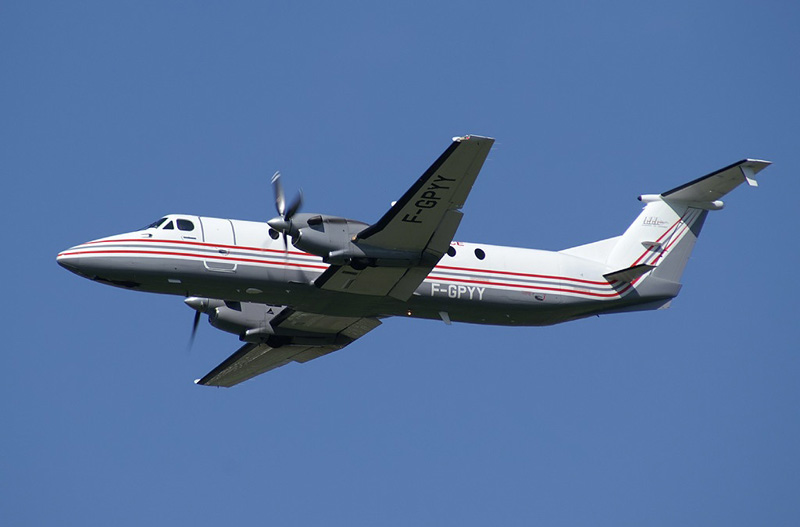
Beechcraft 1900, short-range commuter aircraft

Light aircraft can be used as small commuter airliners, or as air taxis. Twin turboprops carrying up to 19 passengers include the Beechcraft 1900, Fairchild Metro, Jetstream 31, DHC-6 Twin Otter and Embraer EMB 110 Bandeirante. Smaller airliners include the single-engined turboprops like the Cessna Caravan and Pilatus PC-12; or twin piston-powered aircraft made by Cessna, Piper, Britten-Norman, and Beechcraft. They often lack lavatories, stand-up cabins, pressurization, galleys, overhead storage bins, reclining seats, or a flight attendant.

== Engines ==
Until the beginning of the Jet Age, piston engines were common on propliners such as the Douglas DC-3. Nearly all modern airliners are now powered by turbine engines, either turbofans or turboprops. Gas turbine engines operate efficiently at much higher altitudes, are more reliable than piston engines, and produce less vibration and noise. The use of a common fuel type – kerosene-based jet fuel – is another advantage.

== Airliner variants ==
Some variants of airliners have been developed for carrying freight or for luxury corporate use. Many airliners have also been modified for government use as VIP transports and for military functions such as airborne tankers (for example, the Vickers VC10, Lockheed L-1011, Boeing 707), air ambulance (USAF/USN McDonnell Douglas DC-9), reconnaissance (Embraer ERJ 145, Saab 340, and Boeing 737), as well as for troop-carrying roles.

== Configuration ==
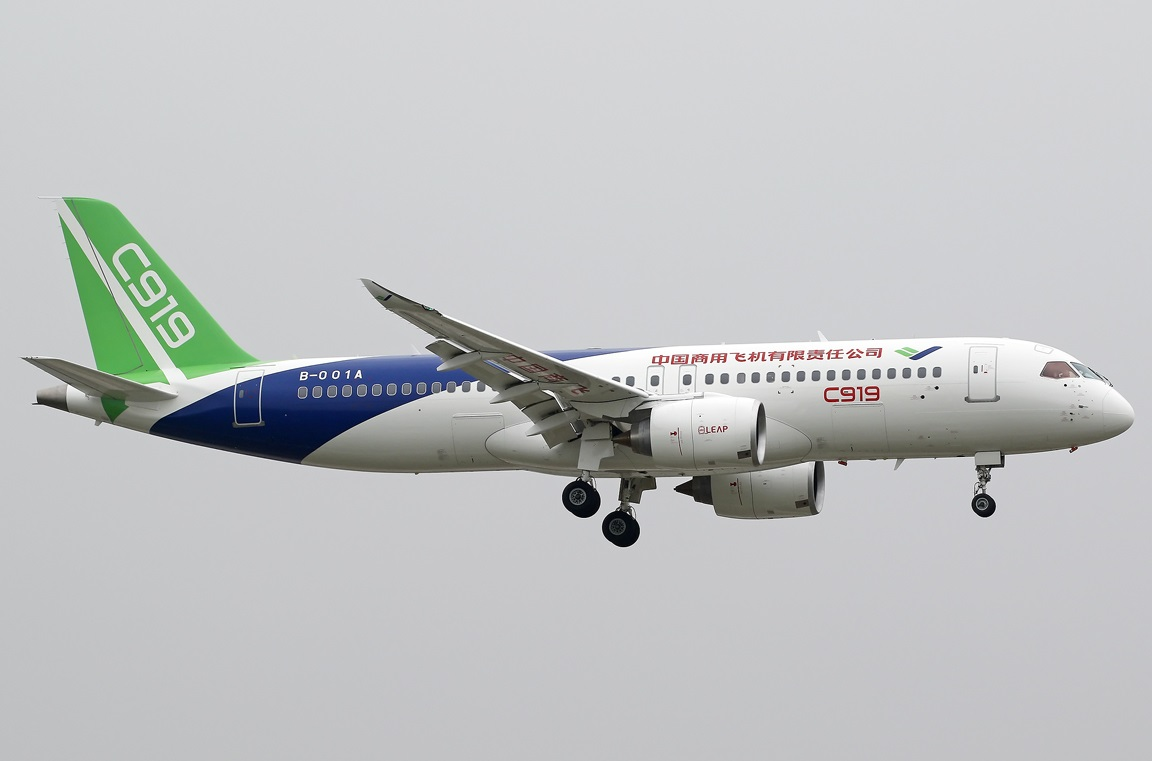
A Chinese Comac C919, uses low-wing designs with two engines mounted underneath the swept wings, during its maiden flight on 5 May 2017

Modern jetliners are usually low-wing designs with two engines mounted underneath the swept wings, while turboprop aircraft are slow enough to use straight wings. Smaller airliners sometimes have their engines mounted on either side of the rear fuselage. Numerous advantages and disadvantages exist due to this arrangement. Perhaps the most important advantage to mounting the engines under the wings is that the total aircraft weight is more evenly distributed across the wingspan, which imposes less bending moment on the wings and allows for a lighter wing structure. This factor becomes more important as aircraft weight increases, and no in-production airliners have both a maximum takeoff weight more than 50 tons and engines mounted on the fuselage. The Antonov An-148 is the only in-production jetliner with high-mounted wings (usually seen in military transport aircraft), which reduces the risk of damage from unpaved runways.

Except for a few experimental or military designs, all aircraft built to date have had all of their weight lifted off the ground by airflow across the wings. In terms of aerodynamics, the fuselage has been a mere burden. NASA and Boeing are currently developing a blended wing body design in which the entire airframe, from wingtip to wingtip, contributes lift. This promises a significant gain in fuel efficiency.

== Current manufacturers ==
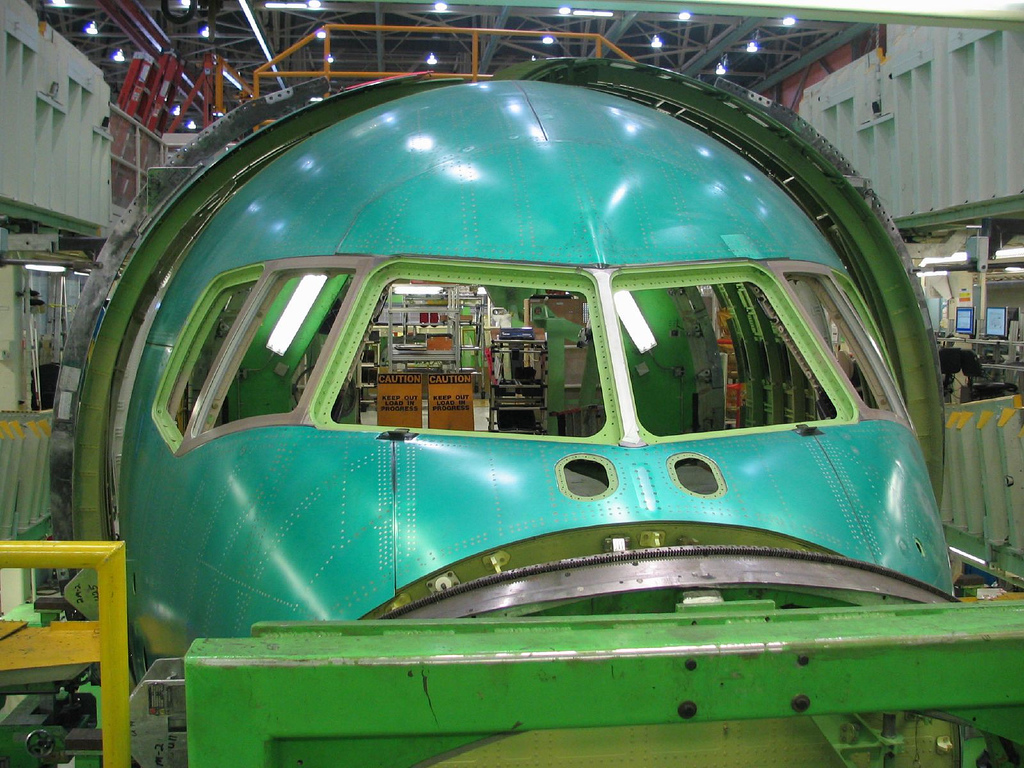
Assembly of a Boeing 767 nose section

The major manufacturers with large aircraft airliners currently in production include:

- Airbus (France/Germany/Spain/United Kingdom/Canada)
- Antonov (Ukraine)
- ATR Aircraft (France/Italy)
- Boeing (United States)
- Britten-Norman (United Kingdom)
- Comac (China)
- De Havilland Canada (Canada)
- Embraer (Brazil)
- Irkut Corporation (UAC, Russia, includes Sukhoi)
- Let Kunovice (Czech Republic)
- Xi'an Aircraft Industrial Corporation (China)

The narrow-body and wide-body airliner market is dominated by Airbus and Boeing, and the regional airliner market is shared between ATR Aircraft, De Havilland Canada, and Embraer.

Setting up a reliable customer support network, ensuring uptime, availability and support 24/7 and anywhere, is critical for the success of airliner manufacturers. Boeing and Airbus are ranked 1 and 2 in customer satisfaction for aftermarket support by a survey by Inside MRO and Air Transport World, and this is a reason why Mitsubishi Aircraft Corporation purchased the Bombardier CRJ program. It is an entry barrier for new entrants like the Xian MA700 and Comac C919, with no credible previous experience with the MA60, or the Irkut MC-21 after the Sukhoi Superjet 100.

== Notable airliners ==
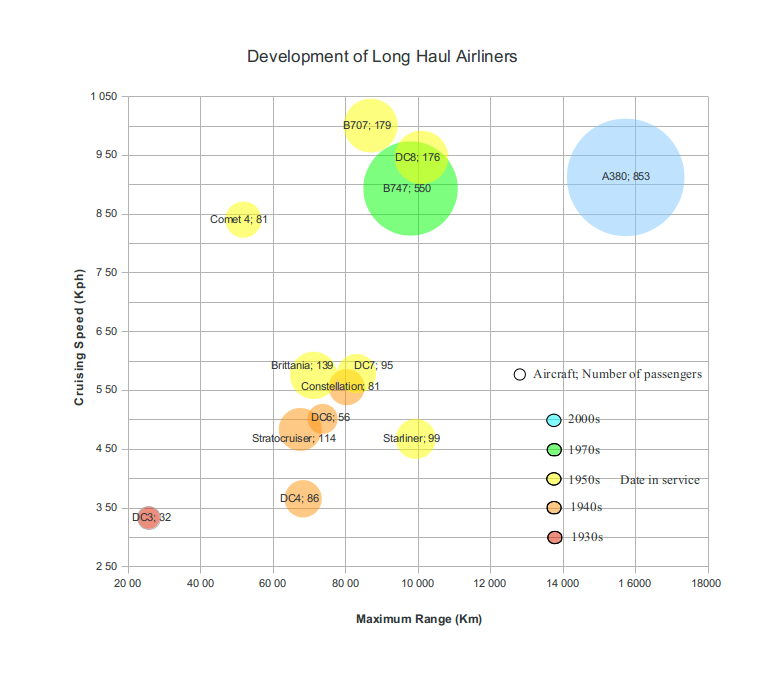
Development of the capabilities of long-haul airliners shown by some notable ones

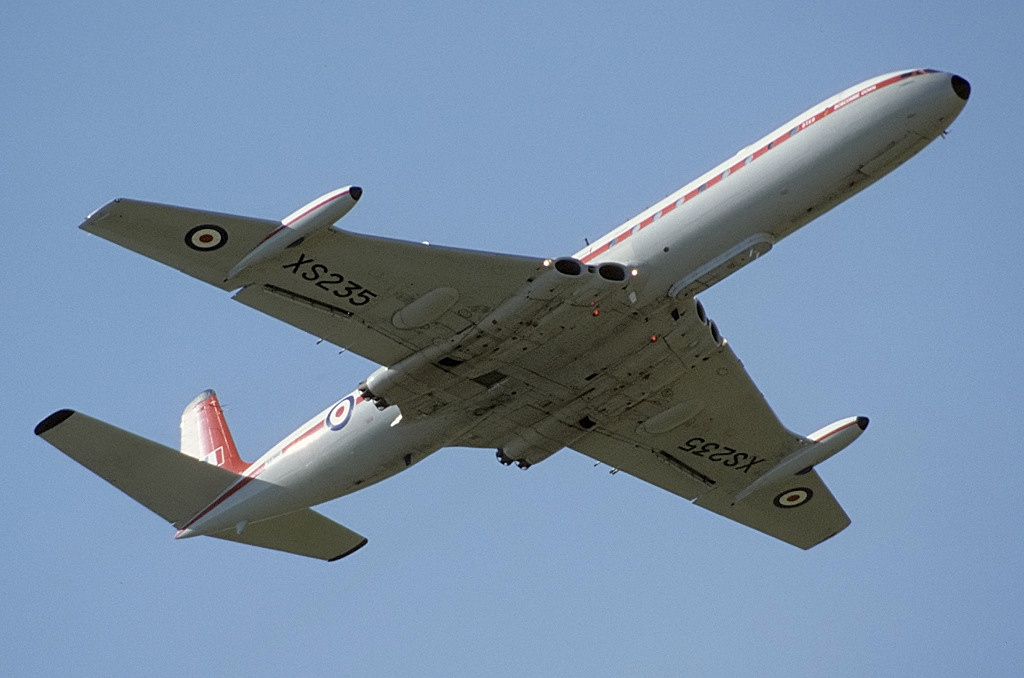
De Havilland Comet – the first jetliner

- Boeing 247 – the first airliner with metal construction and retractable landing gear
- Douglas DC-3 – very widespread, still serving
- Boeing 307 Stratoliner – the first with a pressurized cabin
- Boeing 377 Stratocruiser - popularized multiple passenger decks
- Vickers Viscount – the first turboprop airliner
- Lockheed Constellation – popularized the pressurized cabin
- Antonov An-2 – a single engine biplane, a widespread large utility aircraft
- De Havilland Comet – the first operational jetliner, grounded by early crashes
- Tupolev Tu-104 – the first twinjet, developed into the first turbofan-powered airliner, the Tupolev Tu-124
- Boeing 707 – the most successful early jetliner, along the less widespread Douglas DC-8
- Sud Aviation Caravelle – the first jetliner with rear podded engines, the configuration of the more widespread Douglas DC-9
- Boeing 737 – the most delivered jet airliner before October 2025
- Tupolev Tu-144 – the first operational supersonic transport in 1975, with passenger service 1977-78
- Concorde – the first supersonic airliner in passenger service, operating from 1976 to 2003; the first airliner with fly-by-wire flight controls
- Boeing 747 – the first wide-body aircraft and high-bypass turbofan-powered airliner
- McDonnell Douglas DC-10 – the first trijet wide-body, along the later Lockheed L-1011 TriStar
- Airbus A300 – the first twinjet wide-body, followed by the Boeing 767
- Airbus A320 – the first airliner with digital fly-by-wire flight controls, the highest selling airliner since October 2019, and the most delivered airliner since October 2025
- Boeing 777 – the largest twinjet
- Airbus A380 – full double-deck aircraft, the largest passenger airliner
- Boeing 787 – the first airliner mostly constructed with composite materials

== In production aircraft ==
Mainline airliners as of November 2019
Model	First flight	Net orders	Deliveries	Backlog	MTOW (t)	typ. seats	Range (nmi)
Airbus A220	16/09/2013	397	45	352	60.8-67.6	116-141	2,950-3,200
Airbus A320 family (excl. A318)	22/02/1987	14,096	8,195	5,901	75.5-97	124-206	3,200-4,000
Airbus A330/A330neo	02/11/1992	1,613	1,333	280	242-251	247-287	6,350-8,150
Airbus A350	14/06/2013	889	202	687	280-316	325-366	8,100-8,400
Boeing 737 NG/737 MAX	09/02/1997	11,447	6,775	4,672	70.1-88.3	126-188	2,935-3,825
Boeing 767-300F	20/06/1995	300	233	67	185		3,255
Boeing 777-300ER/F/777X	24/02/2003	1,356	939	417	349.7-351	336-400	7,370-8,700
Boeing 787	15/12/2009	1,377	728	652	227.9-250.8	242-330	6,430-7,635

== Fleet ==
The airliner fleet went from 13,500 in 2000 to 25,700 in 2017: 16% to 30.7% in Asia/Pacific (2,158 to 7,915), 34.7% to 23.6% in USA (4,686 to 6,069) and 24% to 20.5% in Europe (3,234 to 5,272).

In 2018, there were 29,398 airliners in service: 26,935 passenger transports and 2,463 freighters, while 2,754 others were stored. The largest fleet was in Asia-Pacific with 8,808 (5% stored), followed by 8,572 in North America (10% stored), 7,254 in Europe (9% stored), 2,027 in Latin America, 1,510 in Middle East and 1,347 in Africa. Narrowbody are dominant with 16,235, followed by 5,581 Widebodies, 3,743 Turboprops, 3,565 Regional jets and 399 Others.

Largest in service mainline fleet as of August 2017
Model	2018	2017	2016	2015
Airbus A320 family	7,132	6,838	6,516	6,041
Boeing 737 NG	6,373	5,968	5,556	5,115
Boeing 777	1,422	1,387	1,319	1,258
Airbus A330	1,269	1,214	1,169	1,093
Boeing 737 Classic/original	818	890	931	1,006
Boeing 767	740	744	738	762
Boeing 787	696	554	422	288
Boeing 757	669	689	688	737
Boeing 717/MD-80/90/DC-9	516	607	653	668
Boeing 747	475	489	503	558

Largest in service regional fleet as of August 2017
Model	2018	2017	2016	2015
Embraer E-jets	1,358	1,235	1,140	1,102
ATR42/72	994	950	913	886
Bombardier Q400	956	506	465	451
Bombardier CRJ700/900/1000	775	762	747	696
Bombardier CRJ100/200	515	516	557	558
Embraer ERJ 145 family	531	454	528	606
Beechcraft 1900-100/200/300	420	328	338	347
de Havilland Canada DHC-6 Twin Otter	330	270	266	268
Saab 340	215	225	231	228

By the end of 2018, there were 1,826 parked or in storage jetliners out of 29,824 in service (6.1%): 1,434 narrowbodies and 392 widebodies, down from 9.8% of the fleet at the end of 2012 and 11.3% at the end of 2001.

== Market ==
Since it began, the jet airliner market had a recurring pattern of seven years of growth followed by three years of deliveries falling 30–40%, except a steady growth from 2004 due to the economic rise of China going from 3% of world market in 2001 to 22% in 2015, expensive jet fuel till 2014 stimulating old jets replacement allowed by low interest rates since 2008, and strong airline passenger demand since. In 2004, 718 Airbus and Boeings were delivered, worth $39.3 billion; 1,466 are expected in 2017, worth $104.4 billion: a growth by 3.5 from 2004 to 2020 is unprecedented and highly unusual for any mature market.

Manufacturer	2016 orders and deliveries			
Manufacturer	deliveries	values ($bn)	net orders	backlog
Boeing	726	57.8	563	5,660
Airbus	685	45.5	711	6,845
Embraer	108	2.9	39	444
Bombardier	81	1.9	162	437
ATR	73	1.5	36	236
Other	31	0.5	72	1,080
Total	1,704	110.1	1,583	14,702

In 2016, the deliveries went for 38% in Asia-Pacific, 25% in Europe, 22% in North America, 7% in Middle East, 6% in South America and 2% in Africa. 1,020 narrowbodies were delivered and their backlog reach 10891: 4,991 A320neo, 644 A320ceo; 3,593 737 Max, 835 737NG, 348 CSeries, 305 C919 and 175 MC-21; while 398 widebodies were delivered : 137 Dreamliners and 99 B777 for Boeing (65%) against 63 A330 and 49 A350 for Airbus, more than 2,400 widebodies were in backlog, led by the A350 with 753 (31%) then the Boeing 787 with 694 (28%).

The most important driver of orders is airline profitability, itself driven mainly by world GDP growth but also supply and demand balance and oil prices, while new programmes by Airbus and Boeing help to stimulate aircraft demand. In 2016, 38% of the 25 years old airliners had been retired, 50% of the 28 years old : there will be 523 aircraft reaching 25 years old in 2017, 1,127 in 2026 and 1,628 in 2041. Deliveries rose by 80% from 2004 to 2016, they represented 4.9% of the fleet in 2004 and 5.9% in 2016, down from 8% previously. Oil prices and airshow orders are trending together.

In 2020, deliveries were down by more than 50% compared to 2019 due to the impact of the COVID-19 pandemic on aviation, after 10 years of growth.

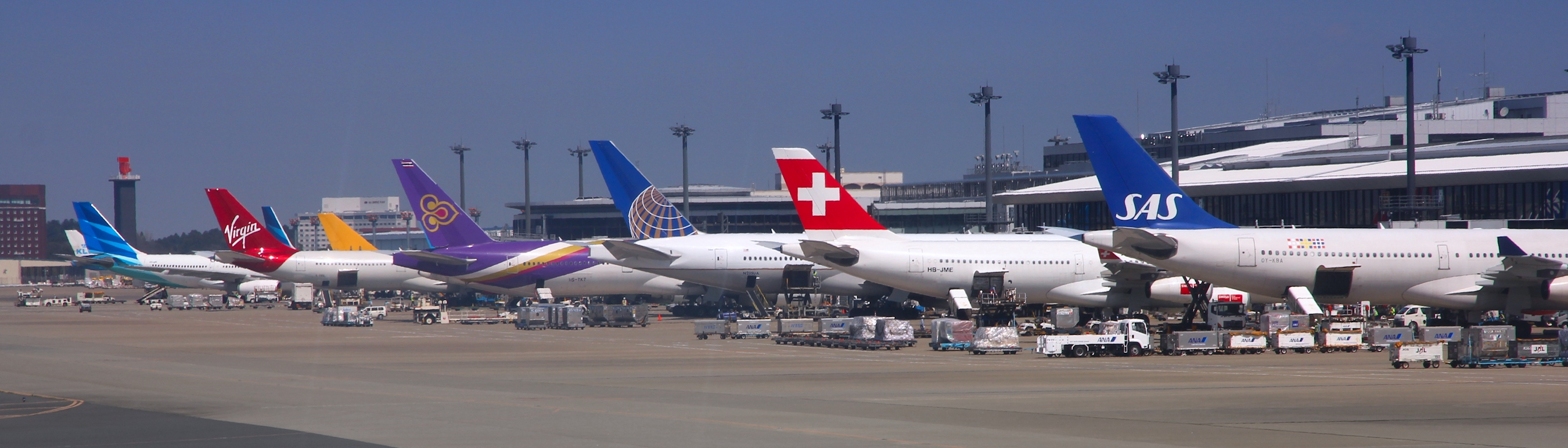
Wide body airliners of various airlines at Tokyo Narita Airport in April 2012

== Storage, scrapping and recycling ==
Storage can be an adjustment variable for the airliner fleet: as Jan–Apr 2018 RPKs are up by 7% over a year and FTKs up by 5.1%, the IATA reports 81 net aircraft went back from storage (132 recalled and 51 stored) in April. It is the second month of storage contraction after eight of expansion and the largest in four years, while new aircraft deliveries fell slightly to 448 from 454 due to supply-chain issues and in-service issues grounding others. Retirements were down by 8% and utilization up by 2%, according to Canaccord Genuity, driving used aircraft and engines values up while MRO shops have unexpected demand for legacy products like the PW4000 and GE CF6.

== Cabin configurations and features ==
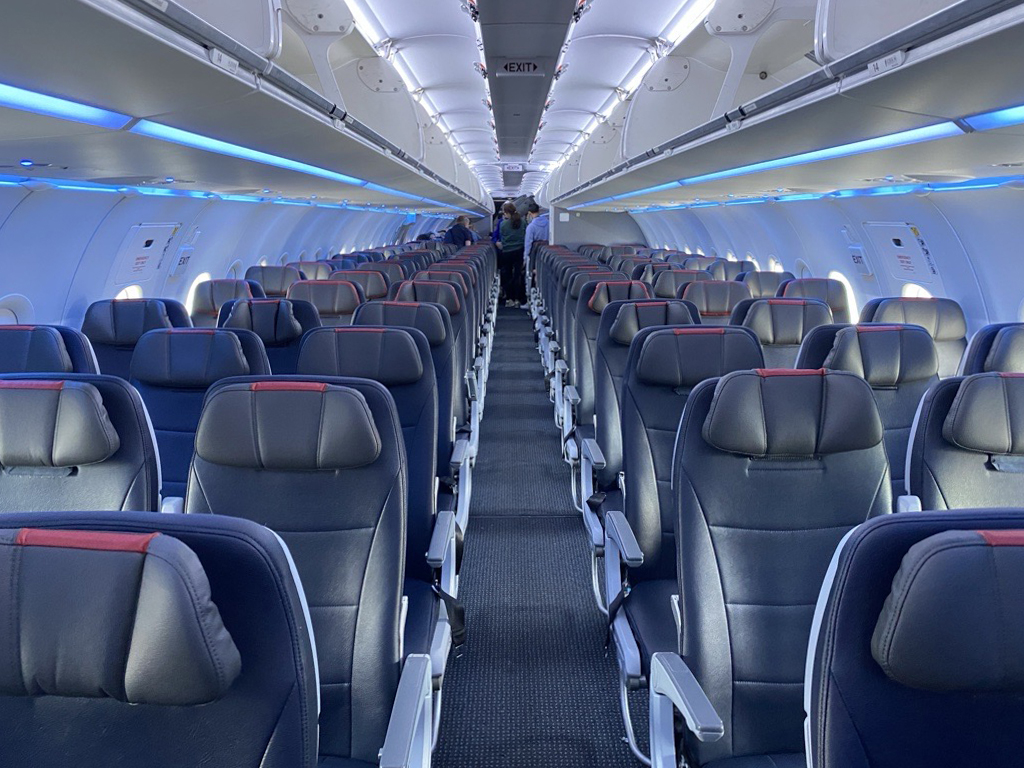
Economy cabin of an American Airlines Airbus A321neo.

An airliner will usually have several classes of seating: first class, business class, and/or economy class (which may be referred to as coach class or tourist class, and sometimes has a separate "premium" economy section with more legroom and amenities). The seats in more expensive classes are wider, more comfortable, and have more amenities such as "lie flat" seats for more comfortable sleeping on long flights. Generally, the more expensive the class, the better the beverage and meal service.

Domestic flights generally have a two-class configuration, usually first or business class and coach class, although many airlines instead offer all-economy seating. International flights generally have either a two-class configuration or a three-class configuration, depending on the airline, route and aircraft type. Many airliners offer movies or audio/video on demand (this is standard in first and business class on many international flights and may be available on economy). Cabins of all classes have lavatory facilities, reading lights, and air vents. Some larger airliners have a rest compartment reserved for crew use during breaks.

=== Seats ===
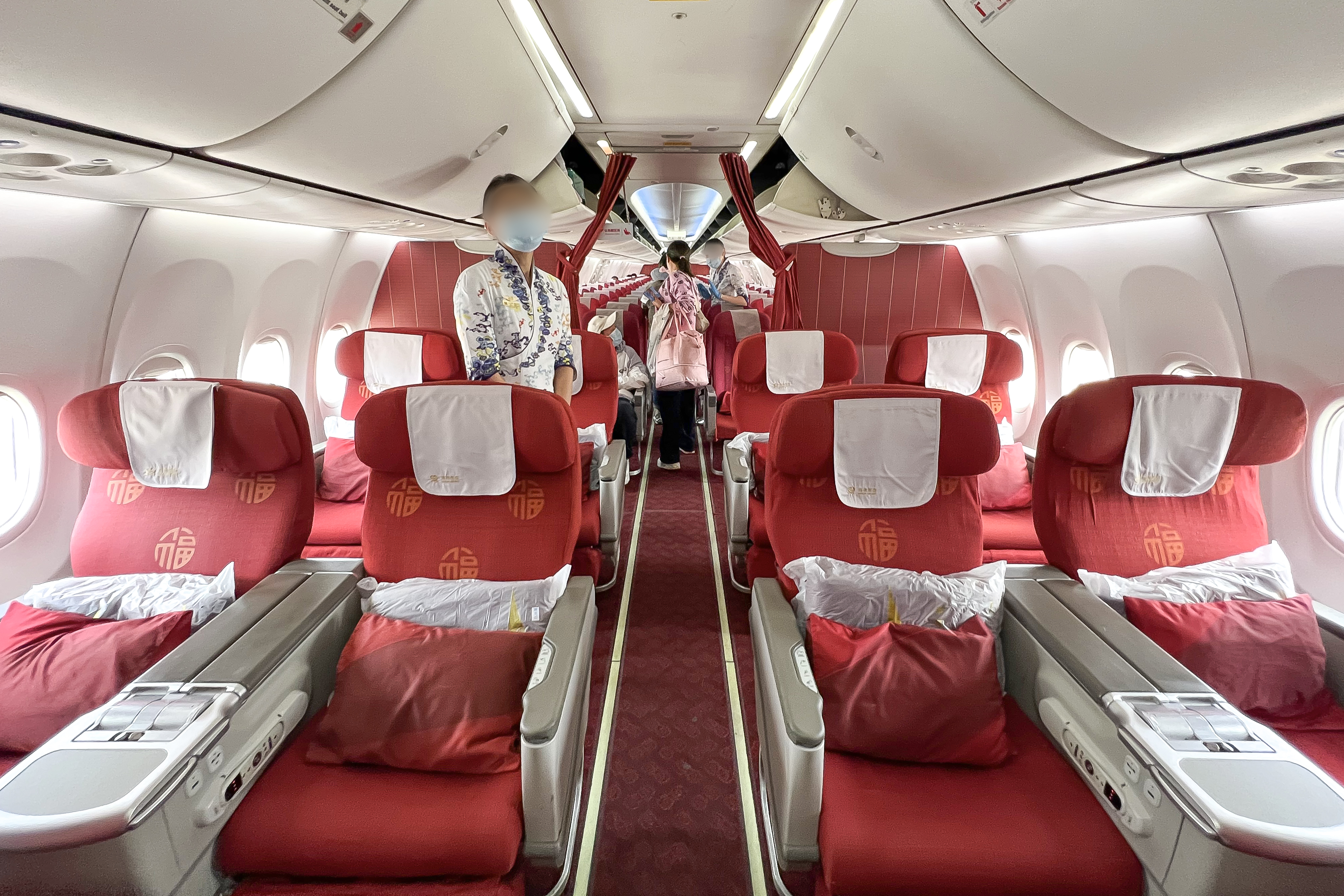
Business class cabin of Hainan Airlines Boeing 737 MAX.

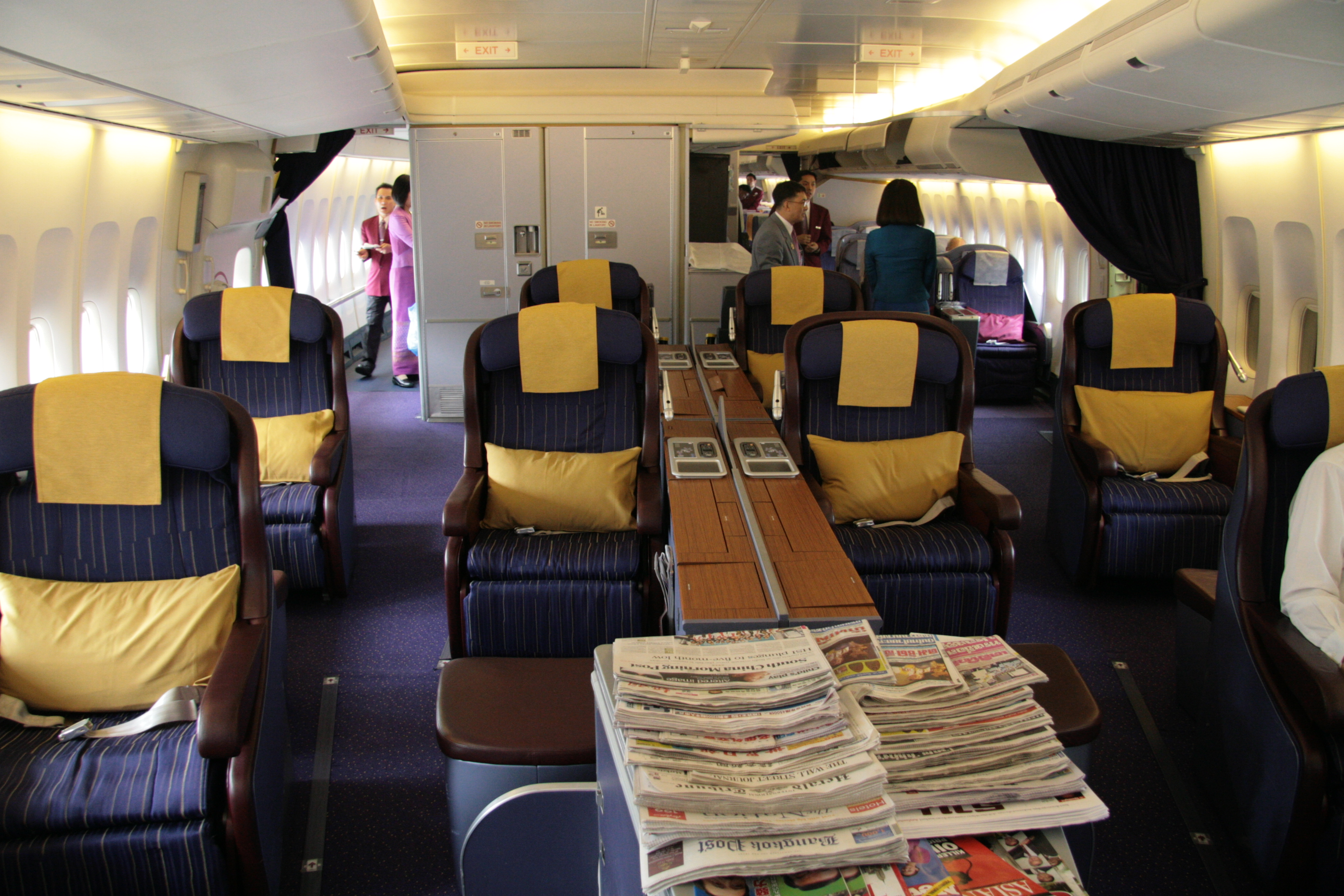
First class cabin of Thai Airways Boeing 747-400.

The types of seats that are provided and how much legroom is given to each passenger are decisions made by the individual airlines, not the aircraft manufacturers. Seats are mounted in "tracks" on the floor of the cabin and can be moved back and forth by the maintenance staff or removed altogether. One driver of airline profitability is how many passengers can be seated in economy class cabins, meaning that airline companies have an incentive to place seats close together to fit as many passengers in as possible. In contrast, 'premium class' seat configurations provide more space for travelers.

Passengers seated in an exit row (the row of seats adjacent to an emergency exit) usually have substantially more legroom than those seated in the remainder of the cabin, while the seats directly in front of the exit row may have less legroom and may not even recline (for evacuation safety reasons). However, passengers seated in an exit row may be required to assist cabin crew during an emergency evacuation of the aircraft opening the emergency exit and assisting fellow passengers to the exit. As a precaution, many airlines prohibit young people under the age of 15 from being seated in the exit row.

The seats are designed to withstand strong forces so as not to break or come loose from their floor tracks during turbulence or accidents. The backs of seats are often equipped with a fold-down tray for eating, writing, or as a place to set up a portable computer, or a music or video player. Seats without another row of seats in front of them have a tray that is either folded into the armrest or that clips into brackets on the underside of the armrests. However, seats in premium cabins generally have trays in the armrests or clip-on trays, regardless of whether there is another row of seats in front of them. Seatbacks now often feature small colour LCD screens for videos, television and video games. Controls for this display as well as an outlet to plug in audio headsets are normally found in the armrest of each seat.

=== Overhead bins ===
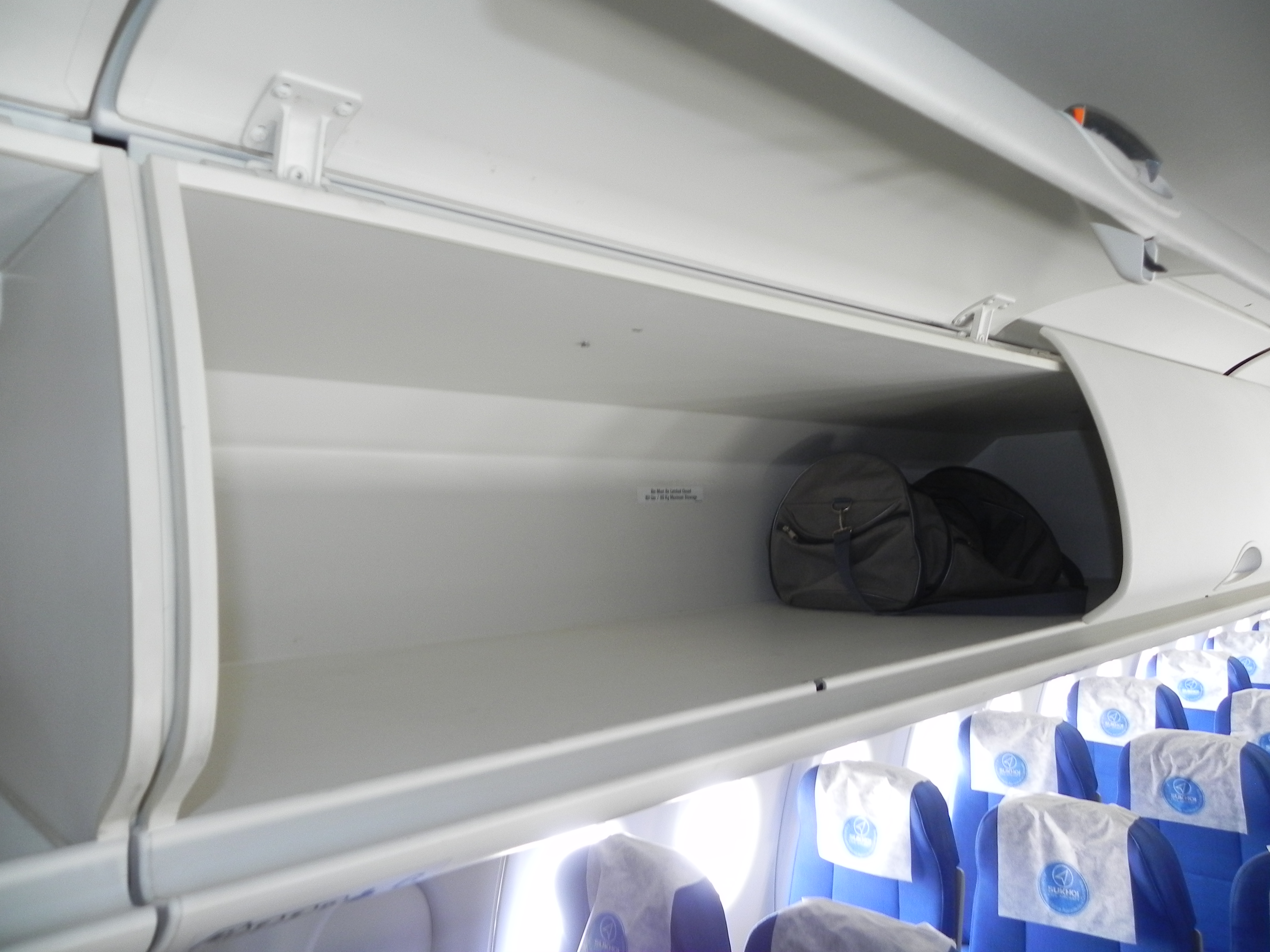
Overhead bins aboard a Sukhoi Superjet 100

The overhead bins, also known as overhead lockers or pivot bins, are used for stowing carry-on baggage and other items. While the airliner manufacturer will normally specify a standard version of the product to supply, airlines can choose to have bins of differing size, shape, or color installed. Over time, overhead bins evolved out of what were originally overhead shelves that were used for little more than coat and briefcase storage. As concerns about falling debris during turbulence or in accidents increased, enclosed bins became the norm. Bins have increased in size to accommodate the larger carry-on baggage passengers can bring onto the aircraft. Newer bin designs have included a handrail, useful when moving through the cabin.

=== Passenger service units ===
Above the passenger seats are Passenger Service Units (PSU). These typically contain reading lights, air vents, and a flight attendant call light. On most narrowbody aircraft (and some Airbus A300s and A310s), the flight attendant call button and the buttons to control the reading lights are located directly on the PSU, while on most widebody aircraft, the flight attendant call button and the reading light control buttons are usually part of the in-flight entertainment system. The units frequently have small "Fasten Seat Belt" and "No Smoking" illuminated signage and may also contain a speaker for the cabin public address system. On some newer aircraft, a "Turn off electronic devices" sign is used instead of the "No Smoking" sign, as smoking isn't permitted on board the aircraft anyway.

The PSU will also normally contain the drop-down oxygen masks which are activated if there is a sudden drop in cabin pressure. These are supplied with oxygen by means of a chemical oxygen generator. By using a chemical reaction rather than a connection to an oxygen tank, these devices supply breathing oxygen for long enough for the airliner to descend to thicker, more breathable air. Oxygen generators do generate considerable heat in the process. Because of this, the oxygen generators are thermally shielded and are only allowed in commercial airliners when properly installed – they are not permitted to be loaded as freight on passenger-carrying flights. ValuJet Flight 592 crashed on May 11, 1996, as a result of improperly loaded chemical oxygen generators.

=== Cabin pressurization ===
Airliners developed since the 1940s have had pressurized cabins (or, more accurately, pressurized hulls including baggage holds) to enable them to carry passengers safely at high altitudes where low oxygen levels and air pressure would otherwise cause sickness or death. High altitude flight enabled airliners to fly above most weather systems that cause turbulent or dangerous flying conditions, and also to fly faster and further as there is less drag due to the lower air density. Pressurization is applied using compressed air, in most cases bled from the engines, and is managed by an environmental control system which draws in clean air, and vents stale air out through a valve.

Pressurization presents design and construction challenges to maintain the structural integrity and sealing of the cabin and hull and to prevent rapid decompression. Some of the consequences include small round windows, doors that open inwards and are larger than the door hole, and an emergency oxygen system.

To maintain a pressure in the cabin equivalent to an altitude close to sea level would, at a cruising altitude around 10,000 m (33,000 ft), create a pressure difference between inside the aircraft and outside the aircraft that would require greater hull strength and weight. Most people do not suffer ill effects up to an altitude of 1,800–2,500 m (5,900–8,200 ft), and maintaining cabin pressure at this equivalent altitude significantly reduces the pressure difference and therefore the required hull strength and weight. A side effect is that passengers experience some discomfort as the cabin pressure changes during ascent and descent to the majority of airports, which are at low altitudes.

=== Cabin climate control ===
The air bled from the engines is hot and requires cooling by air conditioning units. It is also extremely dry at cruising altitude, and this causes sore eyes, dry skin and mucosa on long flights. Although humidification technology could raise its relative humidity to comfortable middle levels, this is not done since humidity promotes corrosion to the inside of the hull and risks condensation which could short electrical systems, so for safety reasons it is deliberately kept to a low value, around 10%. Another problem of the air coming from the ventilation (unto which the oil lubrication system of the engines is hooked up) is that fumes from components in the synthetic oils can sometimes travel along, causing passengers, pilots and crew to be intoxicated. The illness it causes is called aerotoxic syndrome.

== Baggage holds ==
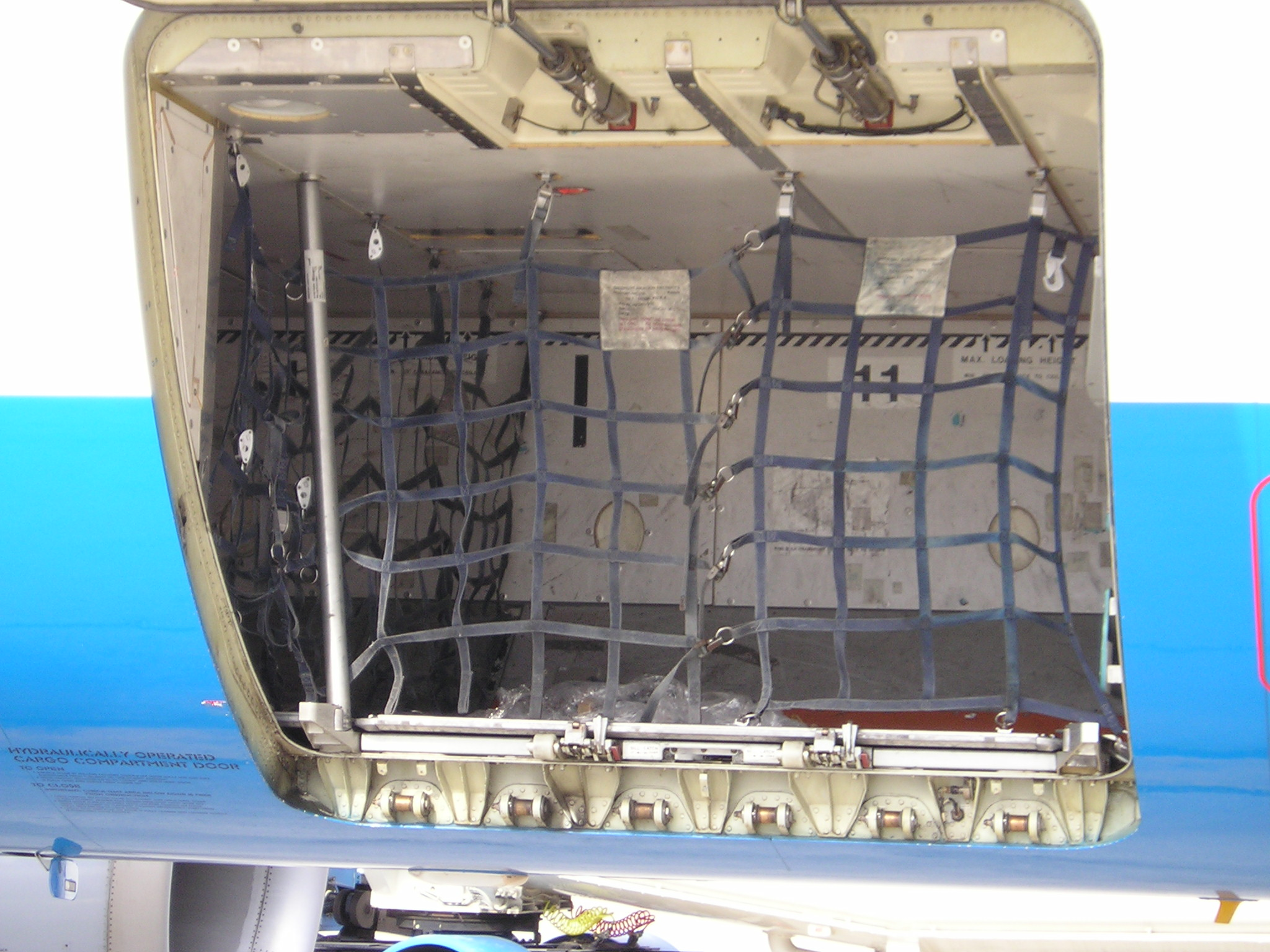
Airbus A320 baggage hold

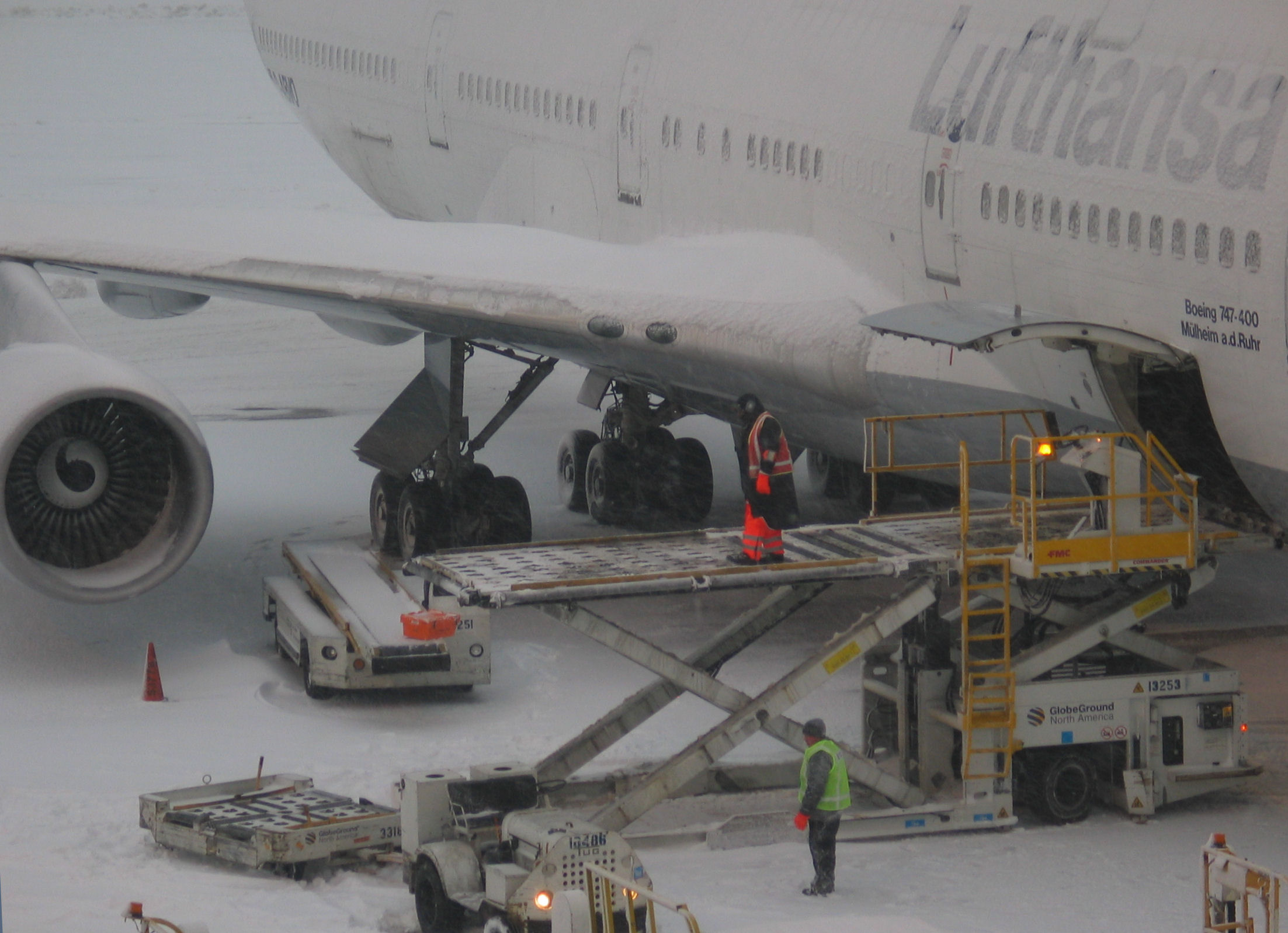
Loading luggage onto a Boeing 747 at Boston Logan Airport, during snow

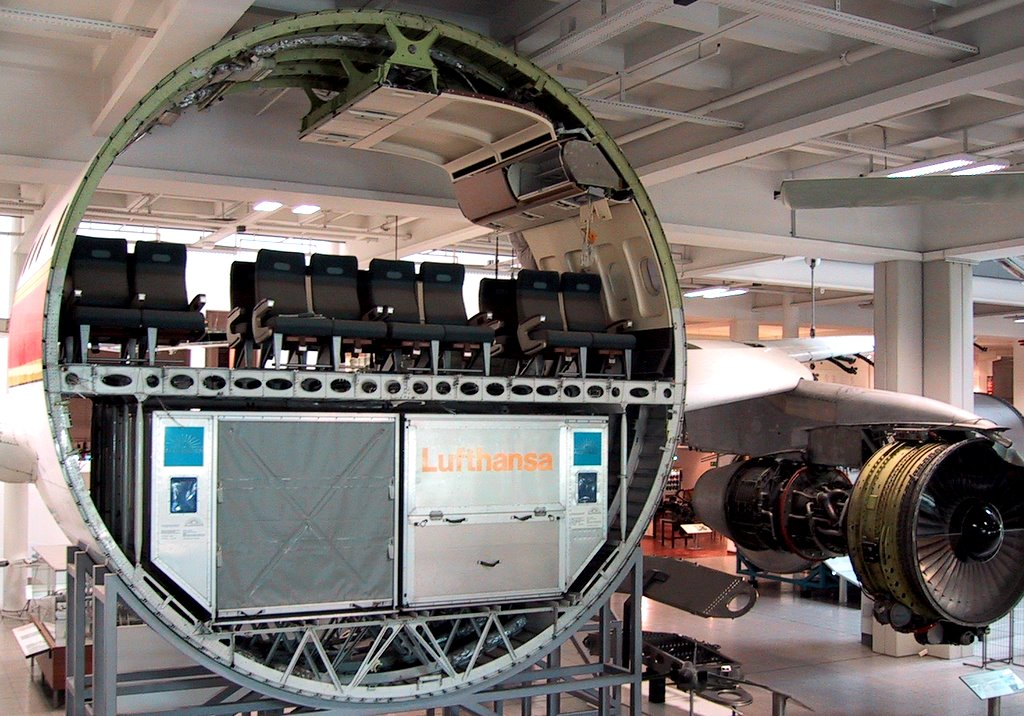
An Airbus A300's cross-section, showing cargo (with Unit Load Devices), passenger, and overhead areas

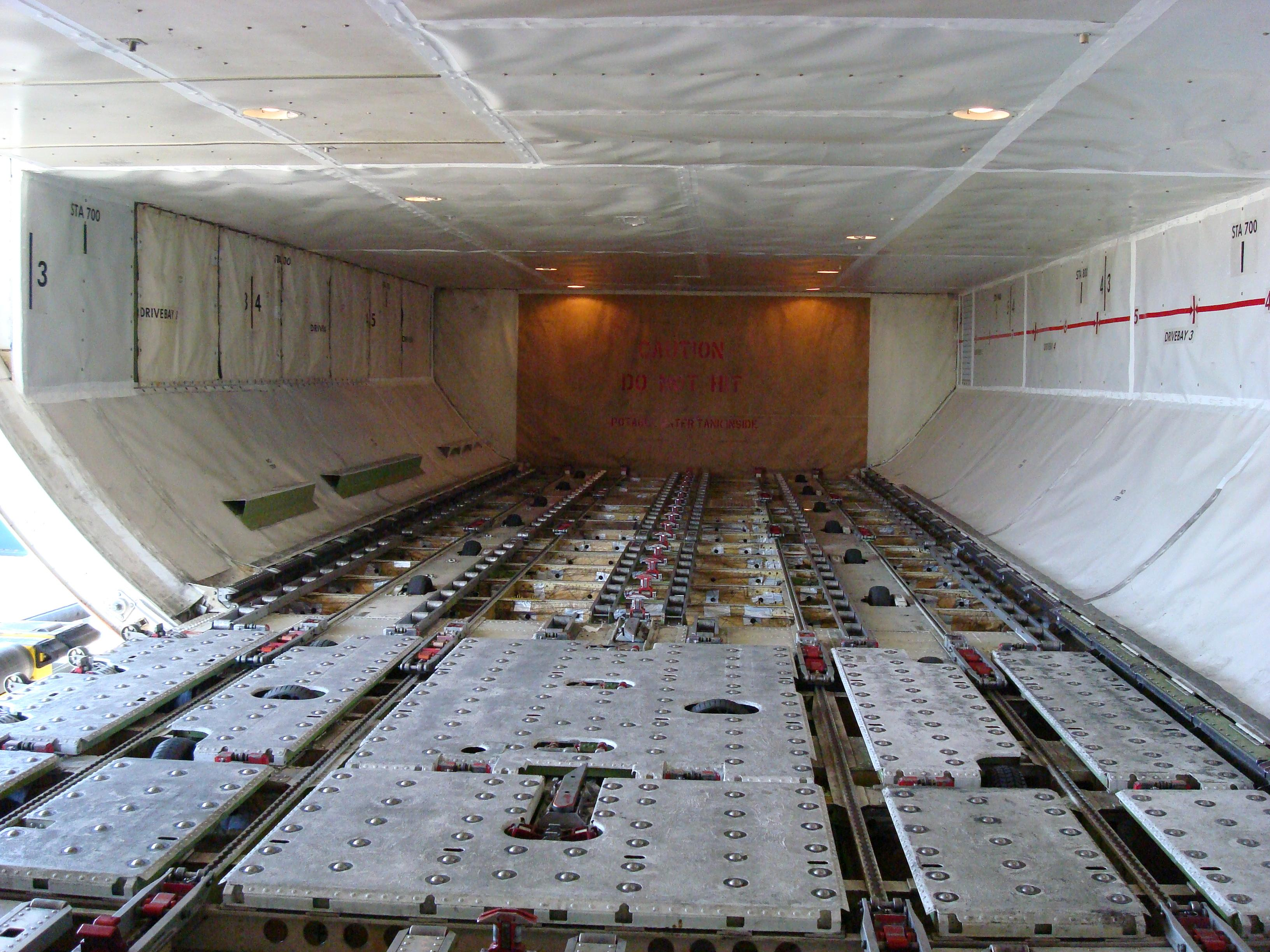
Boeing 747 front lower compartment. Note the rollers for ULDs on the floor and the partition labeled "Caution: Do Not Hit – Potable Water Tank Inside".

Airliners must have space on board to store "checked" baggage – that which will not safely fit in the passenger cabin.

Designed to hold baggage as well as freight, these compartments are called "cargo bins", "baggage holds", "luggage holds", or occasionally "pits". Occasionally baggage holds may be referred to as cargo decks on the largest of aircraft. These compartments can be accessed through doors on the outside of the aircraft.

Depending on the aircraft, baggage holds are normally inside the hull and are therefore pressurized just like the passenger cabin although they may not be heated. While lighting is normally installed for use by the loading crew, typically the compartment is unlit when the door is closed.

Baggage holds on modern airliners are equipped with fire detection equipment and larger aircraft have automated or remotely activated fire-fighting devices installed.

=== Narrow-body airliners ===
Most "narrow-body" airliners with more than 100 seats have space below the cabin floor, while smaller aircraft often have a special compartment separate from the passenger area but on the same level.

Baggage is normally stacked within the bin by hand, sorted by destination category. Netting that fits across the width of the bin is secured to limit movement of the bags. Airliners often carry items of freight and mail. These may be loaded separately from the baggage or mixed in if they are bound for the same destination. For securing bulky items "hold down" rings are provided to tie items into place.

=== Wide-body airliners ===
"Wide-body" airliners frequently have a compartment like the ones described above, typically called a "bulk bin". It is normally used for late arriving luggage or bags which may have been checked at the gate.

However, most baggage and loose freight items are loaded into containers called Unit Load Devices (ULDs), often referred to as "cans". ULDs come in a variety of sizes and shapes, but the most common model is the LD3. This particular container has approximately the same height as the cargo compartment and fits across half of its width.

ULDs are loaded with baggage and are transported to the aircraft on dolly carts and loaded into the baggage hold by a loader designed for the task. By means of belts and rollers an operator can maneuver the ULD from the dolly cart, up to the aircraft baggage hold door, and into the aircraft. Inside the hold, the floor is also equipped with drive wheels and rollers that an operator inside can use to move the ULD properly into place. Locks in the floor are used to hold the ULD in place during flight.

For consolidated freight loads, like a pallet of boxes or an item too oddly shaped to fit into a container, flat metal pallets that resemble large baking sheets that are compatible with the loading equipment are used.

== See also ==
=== Lists ===
- Regional jets
- List of civil aircraft
- List of regional airliners
- List of airliners by maximum takeoff weight

=== Topics ===
- Aircraft design process
- Aircraft spotting
- Aviation and the environment
- Aviation safety
- Flight length
- Flight planning
