= Albessard Triavion =

Aircraft

Triavion
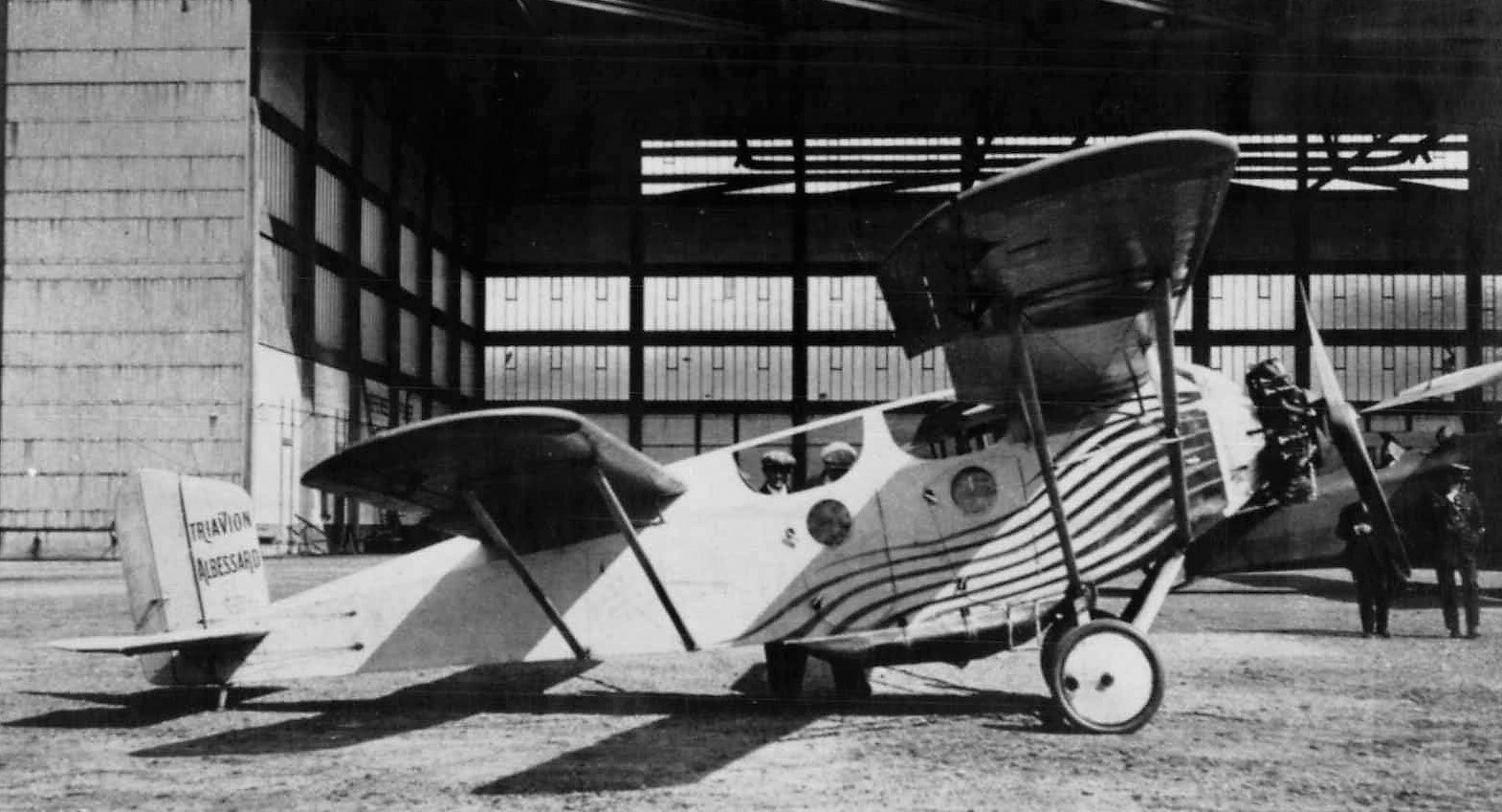

General information
- Type: Three surface aircraft
- National origin: France
- Manufacturer: Louis Peyret
- Designer: Joseph Albessard
- Number built: 1

History
- First flight: August 1926

The Albessard Triavion, sometimes known as the Peyret-Albessard Triavion, was a three surface aircraft, combining a tandem wing and conventional tailplane.

== Design and development ==
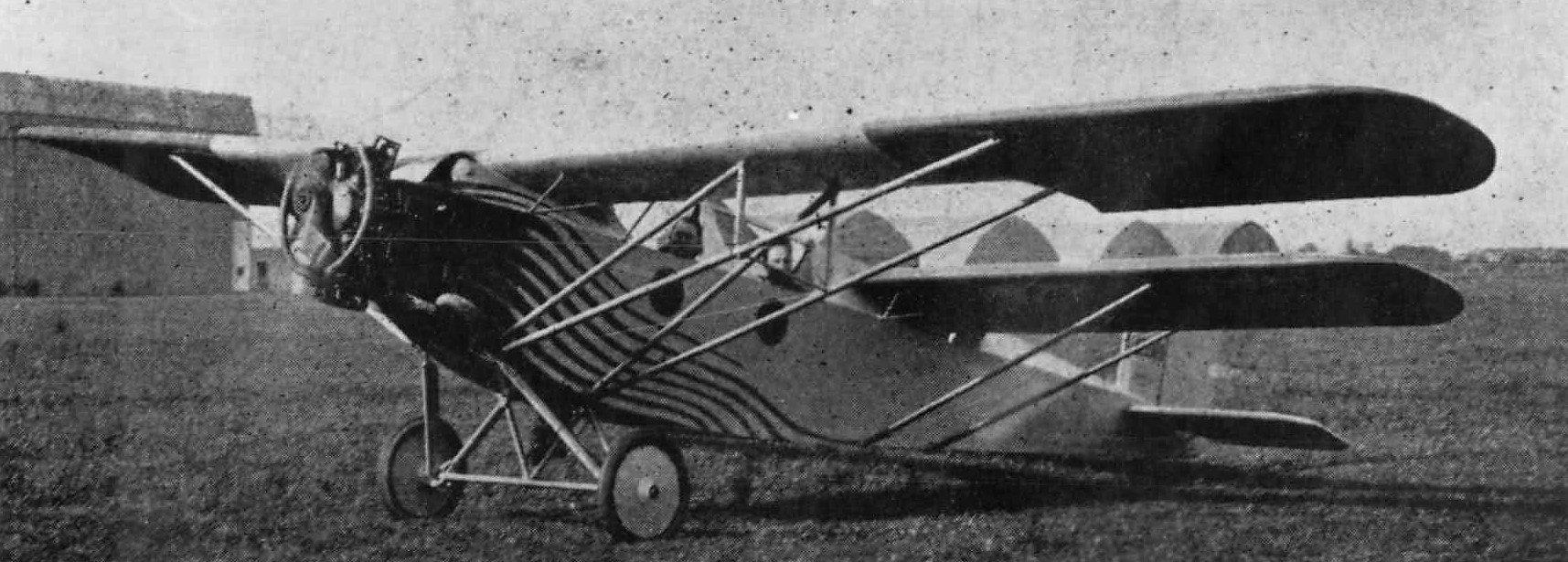
Albessard Triavion photo from NACA Aircraft Circular No.89

In 1912 L. J. A. Albessard applied for a patent on a naturally stable aircraft which was published in February 1913. This was followed in 1914 with a four-seat tandem wing transport. Tandem wing aircraft had been flown before, for example the Bleriot VI in 1907, but the Albessard design differed in retaining a conventional tail unit. The 1926 Albessard Triavion further developed this layout. It was built by Louis Peyret, the designer of the world record breaking Peyret Tandem, a tandem wing glider. The overriding aim of Albessard's designs was safety, even if this compromised manoeuvrability and speed, with automatic stability and a soft stall achieved by locating the centre of gravity at the combined centre of lift of the two wings, combined with structural strength. The Triavion was wood-framed and plywood skinned throughout.

The two wings, both with straight, slightly swept leading edges, were mounted in tandem in the top of the fuselage. It was well known that such an arrangement led to an aerodynamically inefficient rear wing, as it was in the downwash of the forward wing, so Albessard gave the inner panel of the latter a symmetric section set at 0° angle of incidence that produced no lift or downwash in level flight. This 7.50 m^{2} (80.7 sq ft) area inner panel, with a slightly narrower chord than the outer panels, had a span almost as large as that of the rear wing. The outer, cambered panels, connected to the inner with short junction sections, were set at an incidence of 3° and produced lift. The rear wing was simpler and of constant chord, as broad as the outer forward wing panels and having 1.4 times their area. The wings were separated by about twice the rear wing chord. Together, the two forward outer panels and the rear wing produced a triangle of parallel lift vectors leading, according to Albessard, to the aircraft's stability. There were ailerons both on the forward outer panels and on the full span of the rear wings. These were operated differentially and could be used either as conventional ailerons or as camber changing devices.

The Triavion's fuselage was rectangular in cross-section, flat sided and bottomed but topped with a triangular section decking through which the wings passed. The forward wing was braced to the lower fuselage longerons with two pairs of parallel lift struts on each side, one pair to the neutral lift inner section and the other to the outer panels. These pairs had horizontal and vertical jury struts between them. A pair of N-form struts angled outwards from the upper longerons to form a cabane supporting the centre section of the wing. The shorter rear wing needed only a single parallel pair on each side from the lower fuselage with similar upper longeron N-struts. Its 70 hp (70 hp) six cylinder, radial Anzani engine was mounted in the nose. The forward cockpit was just under a V-shaped cut-out in the centre section trailing edge and the second was midway between the two wings; both were within the triangular decking, which had large openings in it, and there were also round apertures in the sides to improve downward vision. Both cockpits were accessed via starboard-side doors. The empennage was conventional, with a large, upright fin and a vertical edged unbalanced rudder that went down to the keel; the cantilever tailplane and elevators were rectangular in plan, with rounded corners and a cut-out for rudder movement, and were mounted a little lower than the wings on the upper fuselage longerons. It had conventional landing gear with mainwheels on a single axle rubber sprung to V-struts from the lower fuselage, their rear members part of a transverse inverted W-form strut also joined to the central fuselage. There was a short tailskid.

Some sources give the date of the Triavion's first flight as 10 August 1926; it certainly flew at the Concours d'Avions Economique which began on that date at Orly; though originally registered as a competitor it only arrived mid-week and did not take part in the contest. After tests and modifications, it received its certificate of airworthiness on 3 October 1927. Sometime in that year it was fitted with a 95 hp (95 hp) Salmson 7AC seven-cylinder radial engine. (Note: Alone amongst contemporary sources, L'Aéronautique states that the Triavion initially had a 40 hp Salmson rather than a 70 hp Anzani. It also gives the power of the later Salmson engine as 75 hp where NACA state 95 hp.) It was later sold to the state. After aileron flutter was induced in a full power dive, L'Ailes wrote an article characterising it as a reliable carthorse rather than a highly strung racehorse. Despite test flights over two years covering more than 6,000 km (3,700 mi) with seven pilots who responded positively to its simple throttle and aileron controllability and refusal to stall violently or spin, plans for a second aircraft found no buyers.

== Specifications (Anzani engine) ==
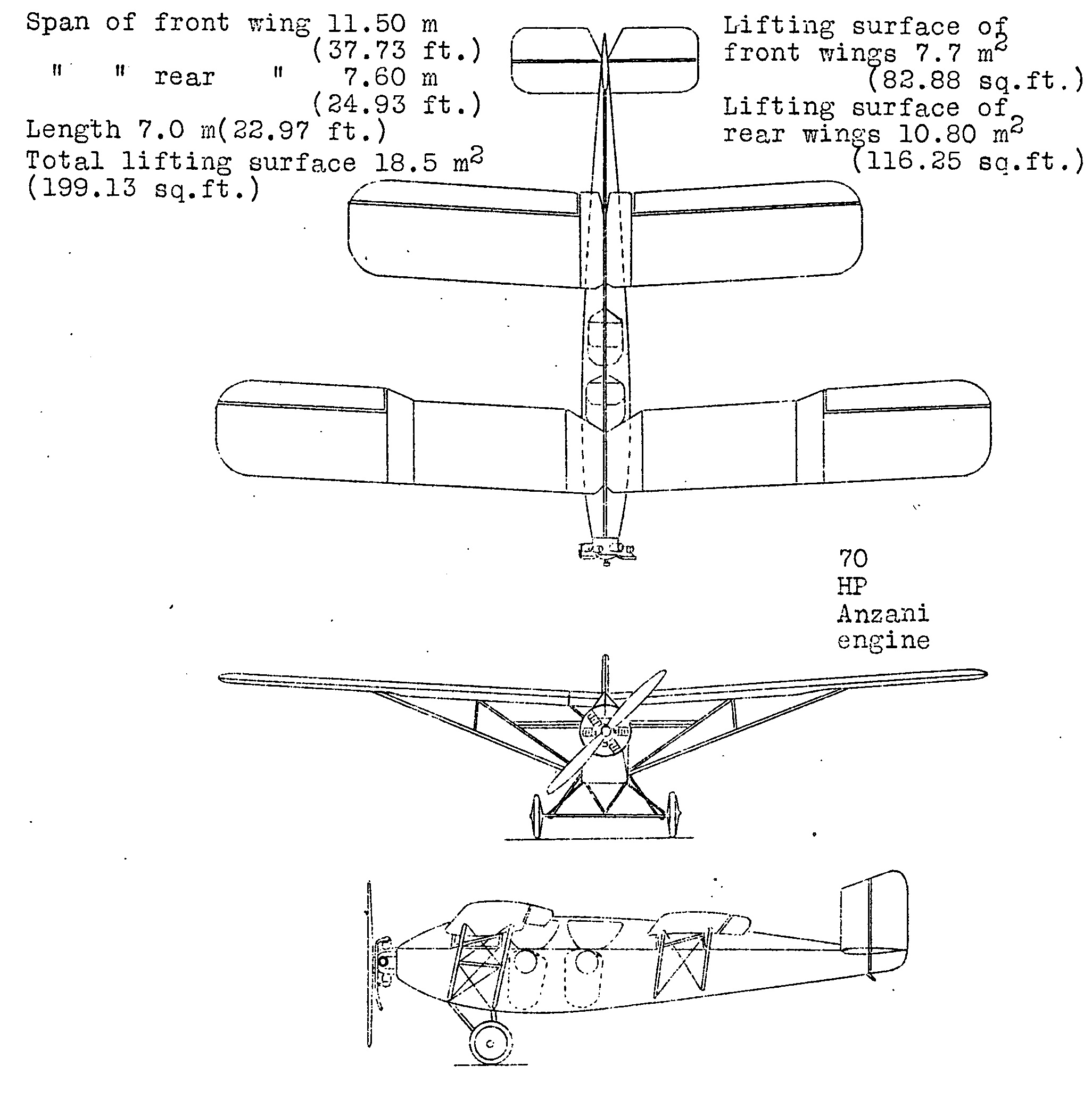
Albessard Triavion 3-view drawing from NACA Aircraft Circular No.89

Data from Aircraft Circulars No.89, N.A.C.A.

General characteristics

- Crew: one pilot
- Capacity: one passenger
- Length: 7.00 m (23 ft 0 in)
- Upper wingspan: 11.50 m (37 ft 9 in) front wing
- Lower wingspan: 7.60 m (24 ft 11 in) rear wing
- Height: 2.00 m (6 ft 7 in)
- Wing area: 18.50 m^{2} (199.1 sq ft) total lifting area; rear wing area 58% of total
- Empty weight: 320 kg (705 lb)
- Gross weight: 550 kg (1,213 lb)
- Powerplant: 1 × Anzani 6-cylinder radial, 52 kW (70 hp)
- Propellers: 2-bladed

Performance

- Maximum speed: 125 km/h (78 mph, 67 kn) all performance figures calculated
- Stall speed: 65 km/h (40 mph, 35 kn) minimum speed
- Range: 650 km (400 mi, 350 nmi)
- Service ceiling: 480 m (1,570 ft)
