= Miles Libellula =

Miles Libellula refers to two aircraft designs:

- Miles M.35 Libellula, experimental tandem wing fighter design
- Miles M.39B Libellula, scaled experimental tandem wing bomber design
