= Miles M.35 Libellula =

1940s British experimental aircraft

M.35 Libellula
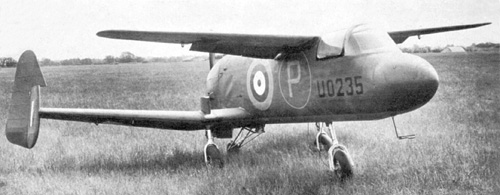

General information
- Type: Tandem wing research aircraft
- National origin: United Kingdom
- Manufacturer: Miles Aircraft
- Designer: Ray Bournon
- Number built: 1

History
- First flight: 1 May 1942

The Miles M.35 Libellula was a tandem wing research aircraft built by Miles Aircraft as a precursor to a proposed naval carrier fighter. It was named after the Libellula, a genus of dragonflies.

== Design and development ==
Carrier aircraft are at a disadvantage compared to land-based equivalents because they require wing-folding systems increasing the aircraft's weight at the expense of payload. Adaptations of single-engined tail-dragger land-based aircraft typically had poor visibility during landing. In 1941, Miles became aware of the high accident rates for carrier landings. They began private venture work on unorthodox configurations potentially solving the visibility problem and the complications of folding wings required for storage of ship-borne aircraft.

While contemplating these problems, George Herbert Miles visited the Aeroplane and Armament Experimental Establishment at RAF Boscombe Down. He saw the Westland-Delanne tandem wing Lysander, with a second wing with tip rudders in place of the conventional vertical stabilizer and tailplane arrangement (The wing was added to carry a heavy four-gun turret for ground attack). Miles realized a tandem-wing fighter could be built to fit onto carrier elevators without folding. In addition, the pilot could be seated in the nose for an excellent view during landings. To Miles, the tandem wing configuration appeared to be the answer... provided it was "aerodynamically feasible".

Advantages of a tandem-winged carrier fighter include: small size, manoeuvrability, excellent visibility, reduced weight, and reduced drag. Avoiding the bureaucratic process of submitting an unorthodox design for official consideration, Miles built and flew a mock-up. Miles tasked Ray Bournon with designing a small single-engined single-seat aircraft, the Miles M.35. Without the interference of bureaucrats, design and construction was completed in six weeks. The result was a small wooden aircraft with a high-set front wing and low-set rear wing, fixed tricycle undercarriage, and pusher propeller, with the engine in the rear of the fuselage, and the pilot sitting in the front of the fuselage.

The front wing was moderately-tapered with a straight leading-edge, while the rear wing was in three parts: an unswept center section to clear the propeller and supporting the main undercarriage legs, plus outer sections from about ¼ span swept back at approximately 30°, supporting large end-plate fins at the tips. The fuselage connected all the components, and carried the engine, fuel, cockpit, and nose undercarriage.

== Operational history ==
Flight trials of the M.35 were to commence in 1942, but Miles' chief test pilot was reluctant to take off in the aircraft, whereupon George Miles took over. The M.35 proved to be reluctant to take off; eventually, Miles discovered that if the throttle was closed sharply at speed, the little aircraft leapt into the air. The initial flight on 1 May 1942 was not a success, with the aircraft almost uncontrollable due to an incorrect center-of-gravity. Miles completed this flight successfully. Later flights were more successful after ballasting the aircraft correctly, proving the tandem-wing layout could be useful as a naval fighter. Further flying was carried out in support of Miles other tandem-wing projects.

Miles immediately submitted a proposal for a naval fighter based on the arrangement – called 'Libellula' – to the Admiralty and the Ministry of Aircraft Production. Building the M.35 without official authority, the company was castigated by the Ministry of Aircraft Production which, along with the Admiralty, rejected the proposed fighter. Miles were encouraged by the results from the M.35. They drew a bomber design on the same principles. This was submitted to the bureaucracy in July 1942 to meet the requirements of specification B.11/41; Miles immediately started work on a scale version – the M.39B.

== Specifications (Miles M.35 Libellula) ==
Data from Miles Aircraft since 1925 The Hamlyn Concise Guide to British Aircraft of World War II

General characteristics

- Crew: 1
- Length: 20 ft 4 in (6.20 m)
- Wingspan: 20 ft 5 in (6.22 m) rear wing
  - 20 ft (6.096 m) front wing
- Height: 6 ft 9 in (2.06 m)
- Wing area: 84 sq ft (7.8 m^{2}) rear wing
  - 50 ft² (4.64 m²) forward wing
- Aspect ratio:
  - Front wing 8
  - Rear wing 5
- Airfoil:
  - Front wing root – NACA 23018
  - Front wing tip – NACA 23012
  - Rear wing root – NACA 23018
  - Rear wing tip – NACA 23015
- Empty weight: 1,456 lb (660 kg)
- Gross weight: 1,850 lb (839 kg)
- Powerplant: 1 × de Havilland Gipsy Major 4-cyl inverted in-line air-cooled piston engine, 130 hp (97 kW)

Performance

- Wing loading: 13.7 lb/sq ft (67 kg/m^{2})
- Power/mass: 0.07 hp/lb (0.11 kW/kg)

== See also ==
Related development

- Miles M.39B Libellula

Aircraft of comparable role, configuration, and era

- Arsenal-Delanne 10
- Curtiss-Wright XP-55 Ascender
- Kyushu J7W
- Mikoyan-Gurevich MiG-8

Related lists

- List of experimental aircraft
- List of aircraft of the United Kingdom in World War II
