= Lockspeiser =

Lockspeiser is a surname. Notable people with the surname include:

- Ben Lockspeiser (1891–1990), British scientific administrator
- Edward Lockspeiser (1905–1973), English musicologist, composer, art critic, and radio broadcaster

== See also ==
- Lockspeiser LDA-01
