= Delanne 20-T =

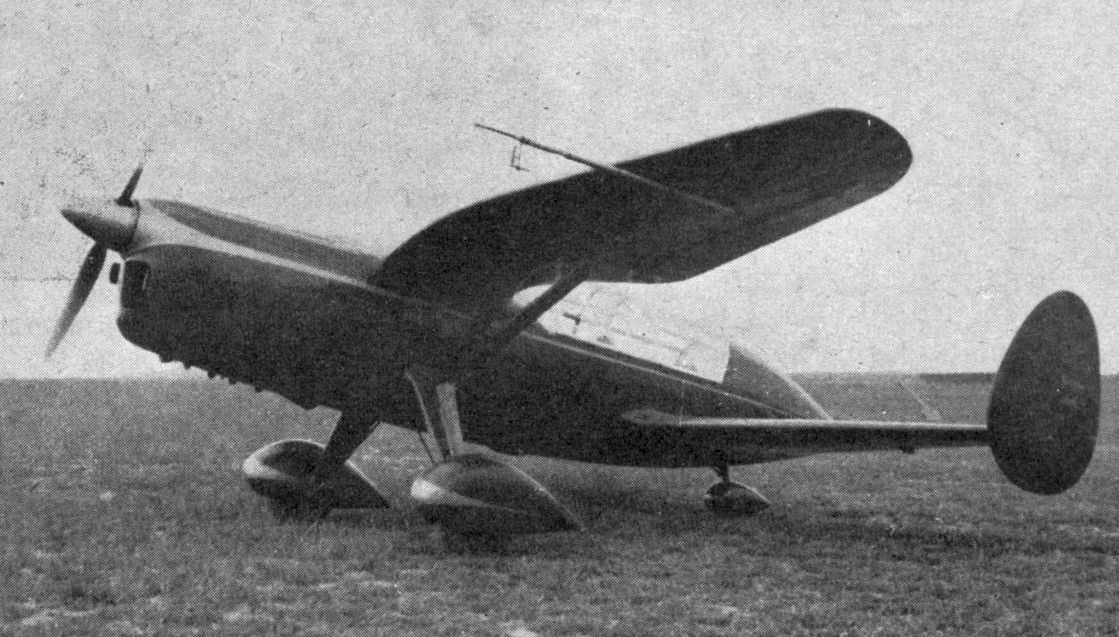

General information
- Type: Two seat experimental aircraft
- National origin: France
- Designer: Maurice Delanne
- Number built: 2

History
- First flight: August 1938

The Delanne 20-T was a French tandem wing aircraft designed as an aerodynamic model for a larger fighter aircraft. It was tested during 1939.

== Design ==
Though sometimes described as a tourer and at others, incorrectly, as a fighter aircraft, the chief purpose of the Delanne 20-T was to explore the characteristics of the tandem wing Arsenal-Delanne 10, which was a fighter, larger than the 20-T and more powerful but aerodynamically very similar; the 20-T, the design of which was underway in the spring of 1937, is best described as a macquette or aerodynamic model of the Arsenal-Delanne 10.

Its two, tandem, wings were very different in plan and well separated vertically, the forward one the higher, with about 840 mm (33 in) between them over most of the span. Their minimum separation horizontally was about 650 mm (26 in).

In plan the leading edge of the forward wing was straight, with only slight sweep out to rounded tips; the trailing edge was also straight but strongly forward swept, producing strong taper over the outer 70% of the span. Inboard the wing chord reduced linearly by about 30% to the root. The outer wing had 3° of dihedral, though the narrowing centre section curved downwards strongly to the roots. The Delanne 20 was an all wood aircraft and each wing was built around two spruce and plywood box spars. The trailing edges carried ailerons and camber changing flaps, coupled to slats on the corresponding sections of the leading edges. The wings were attached to the fuselage upper longerons at their roots and braced to the lower fuselage by a V-form pair of struts from the lower fuselage at about 35% span.

The rear wing was a one piece structure, trapezoidal in plan with an unswept leading edge and constructed like the forward wings. It also had ailerons and flaps, though there were no slats. It was a cantilever structure, attached to the lower fuselage in a way that allowed its angle of attack to be adjusted on the ground. At its tips were fins and unbalanced rudders of combined oval shape.

The fuselage was built around four spruce longerons and was plywood covered. The Delanne 20-T was powered by a Regnier130 kW (180 hp) 6B-01 six cylinder air-cooled inverted inline engine, driving a two blade propeller. The tandem wing design allowed the centre of gravity to be further aft than usual, so the cockpit canopy stretched from the forward wing trailing edge to above the rear wing; the profile of the rear fuselage followed that of the canopy to a pointed rear. Under the canopy the two seats were in tandem and had dual controls; in emergency, the canopy could be jettisoned.

The Delanne 20-T had tailwheel, fixed landing gear, each of its mainwheels independent mounted on a pair of converging tubular legs to the lower fuselage. The rear member was an oleo strut shock absorber and the pair was enclosed in a fairing, as was the wheel. There was also a light strut from the bottom of the pair to the central fuselage underside. The tailwheel was likewise faired.

== Development ==
The Delanne 20-T started tests in May 1938 but may not have flown until August. On its second test flight on 10 August (Note: There is slight uncertainty about the exact date; 9 August and 11 August also appear in some other French contemporary sources) it crashed after engine failure, killing pilot Guy de Chateaubrun. A second example was built and flew late in April 1939. Testing and development flying, conducted by Fernand Lasne, was completed in June 1939 with satisfactory results, after which attention concentrated on the Arsenal-Delanne 10.

== Specifications ==
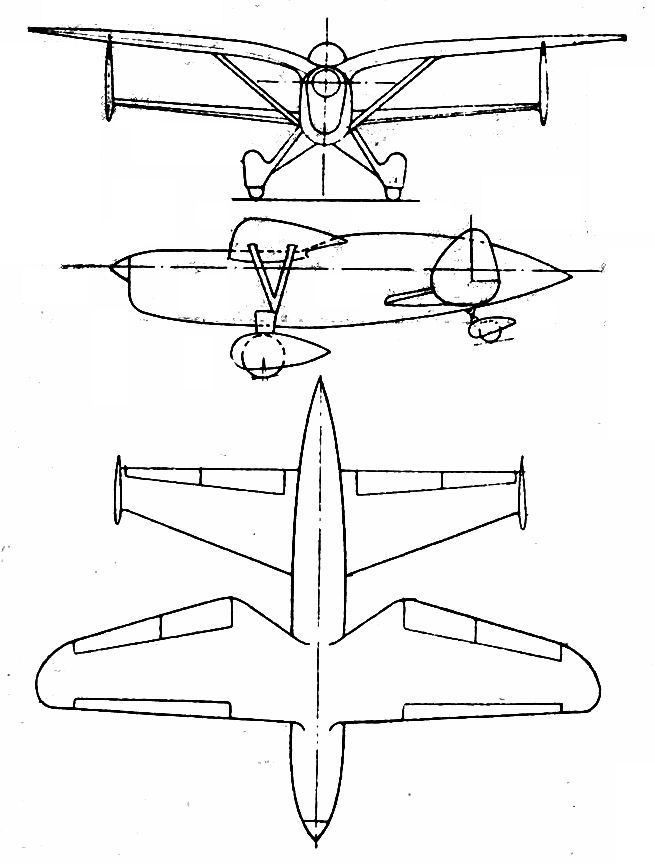
Delanne 20-T-2 3-view drawing from L'Aerophile December 1941

Data from l'Aérophile December 1941

General characteristics

- Crew: Two
- Length: 6.78 m (22 ft 3 in)
- Wingspan: 7.86 m (25 ft 9 in) forward wing, 5.66 m (18 ft 7 in) rear wing
- Height: 2.40 m (7 ft 10 in)
- Wing area: 14 m^{2} (150 sq ft) total, both wings
- Empty weight: 730 kg (1,609 lb)
- Gross weight: 1,031 kg (2,273 lb)
- Powerplant: 1 × Régnier 6 B-01 6-cylinder air cooled inverted inline, 130 kW (180 hp) at 2,200 rpm
- Propellers: 2-bladed Ratier 1380, 2.10 m (6 ft 11 in) diameter , variable pitch

Performance

- Maximum speed: 262 km/h (163 mph, 141 kn)
- Minimum control speed: 70 km/h (43 mph, 38 kn)

== Bibliography ==
- Liron, Jean (December 1988). "Delanne: une certaine formule (1)" [Delanne: A Certain Formula, Part 1]. Le Fana de l'Aviation (in French). No. 229. pp. 20–23. ISSN 0757-4169.
- Roux, Robert J. (December 1970). "Delanne 20 T". L'Album du Fanatique de l'Aviation (in French). No. 17. pp. 8–9. ISSN 0757-4169.
