= Miles M.39B Libellula =

British WWII experimental aircraft

M.39B Libellula
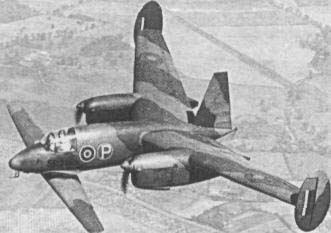
- Miles M.39B in flight

General information
- Type: bomber
- Manufacturer: Miles Aircraft
- Designer: Ray Bournon and George Herbert Miles
- Primary user: Royal Aircraft Establishment
- Number built: 1

History
- First flight: 22 July 1943

The M.39B Libellula (from Libellulidae, a taxonomic family of dragonflies) was a Second World War tandem wing experimental aircraft built by Miles Aircraft. A scale version of the M.39 design was proposed by Miles to meet Air Ministry specification B.11/41 for a fast bomber. The M.39B was used by Miles to generate data from which the M.39 design was improved, but the M.39 project was cancelled and the M.39B broken up.

== Design and development ==
=== M.39 ===
Though it had some problems, the earlier M.35 proved sufficient to show the idea had merits, and the larger M.39 was drawn up as a twin-engined design prepared to meet Specification B.11/41 which had been issued by the Air Ministry for a high speed bomber. The specification had been written for the P.1005 proposal by Hawker, powered by two Napier Sabre engines, estimated to achieve 400+ mph at 25,000 ft and deliver a 2,000 lb bomb load over 1,600 miles. The P.1005 was cancelled after several delays on behalf of the Air Ministry and before Miles submitted his design to the Ministry in July. In November 1943 a full-size prototype (to use the serial RR910) was ordered, but not built.

Until the intended (three) Power Jets W.2/500 turbojets were available the M.39 would have had two Rolls-Royce Merlin 60 inline or Bristol Hercules VIII radial piston engines. The M.39 would have a crew of three in a pressurized cabin. As well as the bomb-bay amidships, the M.39 was intended to carry two fixed 20 mm cannons in the roots of the forward wings.

=== M.39B ===
To prove the concept Miles designed and built a 5/8th scale version, the M.39B, which flew on 22 July 1943, showing no "undesirable handling" characteristics. It coincided with interest by the authorities in unorthodox designs for large aircraft. The rear wing was mounted higher than the forward one to avoid downwash and give ground clearance for the propellers. The M39 design had inboard flaps and outboard ailerons on the rear wing and the front wing had an auxiliary aerofoil/flap/elevator device, which could vary the wing area without changing lift coefficient.

The Ministry of Aircraft Production agreed to a development contract and purchase of the M.39B. Miles continued testing, generating more flight data and submitted an improved M.39 design in early 1944. Meanwhile, the sole M.39B passed to the Royal Aircraft Establishment at Farnborough in 1944, where it carried the serial SR392, being damaged and repaired after two accidents, only to be broken up with the full-sized bomber project's cancellation.

== Specifications (M.39B Mockup) ==
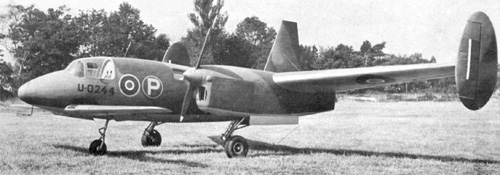
The Miles M.39B Libellula

Data from Miles aircraft since 1925

General characteristics

- Crew: 1
- Length: 22 ft 2 in (6.76 m)
- Wingspan: 37 ft 6 in (11.43 m) rear wing
  - 25 ft (8 m) front wing
- Height: 9 ft 3 in (2.82 m)
- Wing area: 187.5 sq ft (17.42 m^{2}) rear wing
  - 61.7 sq ft (5.73 m^{2}) forward wing
- Aspect ratio:
  - Front wing 10.1
  - Rear wing 7.5
- Airfoil:
  - Front wing: NACA 23018 at root, NACA 2412 at tip
  - Rear wing: NACA 23021 at root, NACA 2415 at tip
- Empty weight: 2,405 lb (1,091 kg)
- Gross weight: 2,800 lb (1,270 kg)
- Fuel capacity: 25 imp gal (113.65 L)
- Sweepback on leading edge rear wing 21° 0′ 48″
- Powerplant: 2 × de Havilland Gipsy Major IC inline piston engine, 140 hp (100 kW) each

Performance

- Maximum speed: 102 mph (164 km/h, 89 kn)
- Stall speed: 59 mph (95 km/h, 51 kn) flaps down
- Rate of climb: 1,100 ft/min (5.6 m/s)
- Wing loading: 11.2 lb/sq ft (55 kg/m^{2})
- Power/mass: 0.1 hp/lb (0.16 kW/kg)

== See also ==
Related development

- Miles M.35 Libellula

Aircraft of comparable role, configuration, and era

- Curtiss-Wright XP-55 Ascender
- Kyushu J7W
- Mikoyan-Gurevich MiG-8

Related lists

- List of experimental aircraft
- List of aircraft of the United Kingdom in World War II

== Bibliography ==
- Brinkworth, B. J. (2016). "On the Aerodynamics of the Miles Libellula Tandem-Wing Aircraft Concept, 1941–1947" (PDF). Journal of Aeronautical History (2): 10–58. ISSN 2753-3786.
- Brown, Don Lambert. Miles Aircraft Since 1925. London: Putnam & Company Ltd., 1970. ISBN 0-370-00127-3.
- Buttler, Tony. British Secret Projects Fighters & Bombers, 1935–1950. Hinckley: Midland Publications, 2004. ISBN 978-1-85780-179-8.
