= Westland Lysander =

Army cooperation and liaison aircraft

Lysander
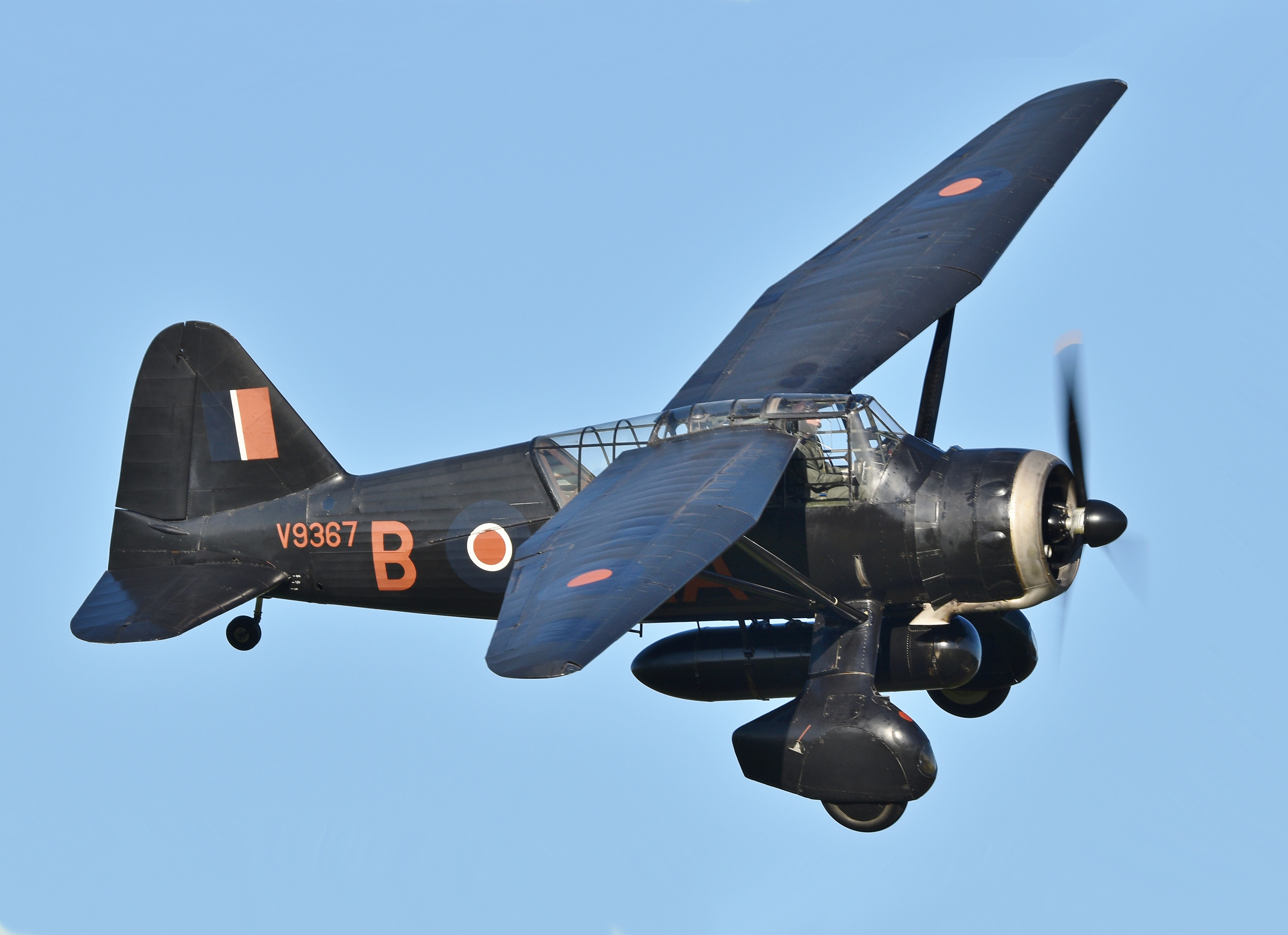
- Preserved Lysander in all-black special duties scheme

General information
- Type: Army co-operation and liaison aircraft
- National origin: United Kingdom
- Manufacturer: Westland Aircraft
- Primary users: Royal Air Force: Indian Air Force; Royal Canadian Air Force; Egyptian Air Force
- Number built: 1,786

History
- Introduction date: June 1938
- First flight: 15 June 1936
- Retired: 1952 (Portugal)

The Westland Lysander is a British army co-operation and liaison aircraft produced by Westland Aircraft that was used immediately before and during the Second World War.

After becoming obsolete in the army co-operation role, the aircraft's short-field performance enabled clandestine missions using small, improvised airstrips behind enemy lines to place or recover agents, particularly in occupied France with the help of the French Resistance. Royal Air Force army co-operation aircraft were named after mythical or historical military leaders; in this case the Spartan admiral Lysander was chosen.

== Design and development ==
The prototype Lysander, K6127, which first flew in June 1936.

The Lysander of the Canadian Warplane Heritage Museum undergoing maintenance, 2016. The aircraft's structure can be seen

In 1934 the Air Ministry issued Specification A.39/34 for an army co-operation aircraft to replace the Hawker Hector. Initially Hawker Aircraft, Avro and Bristol were invited to submit designs, but after some debate within the ministry, a submission from Westland was invited as well. The Westland design, internally designated P. 8, was the work of Arthur Davenport under the direction of "Teddy" Petter. It was Petter's second aircraft design and he spent considerable time interviewing Royal Air Force pilots to find out what they wanted from such an aircraft. The army wanted a tactical and artillery reconnaissance aircraft to provide photographic reconnaissance and observation of artillery fire in daylight – up to about 15,000 yards (14 km) behind the enemy front. The result of Petter's pilot enquiries suggested that field of view, low-speed handling characteristics and STOL performance were the important requirements.

Davenport and Petter designed an aircraft to incorporate these features. The Lysander was to be powered by a Bristol Mercury air-cooled radial engine and had high wings and a fixed conventional landing gear mounted on an innovative inverted U square-section tube that supported wing struts at the apex, and contained internal springs for the faired wheels. The large streamlined spats also contained a mounting for a Browning machine gun and fittings for removable stub wings that could carry light bombs or supply canisters. The wings had a reverse taper towards the root, which gave the impression of a bent gull wing from some angles, although the spars were straight. It had a girder type construction faired with a light wood stringers to give the aerodynamic shape. The forward fuselage was duralumin tube joined with brackets and plates, and the after part was welded stainless steel tubes. Plates and brackets were cut from channel extrusions rather than being formed from sheet steel. The front spar and lift struts were extrusions. The wing was fabric-covered and its thickness was greatest at the strut anchorage, similar to that of later marks of the Stinson Reliant high-winged transport monoplane.

Despite its appearance, the Lysander was aerodynamically advanced, being equipped with fully automatic wing slats and slotted flaps, and a variable incidence tailplane. These refinements gave the Lysander a stalling speed of only 65 mph (56 kn; 105 km/h). The tube that supported the wings and wheels was the largest Elektron alloy extrusion made at the time. Due to the difficulties involved in manufacturing such a large extrusion Canadian-built machines had a conventionally fabricated assembly. The Air Ministry requested two prototypes of the P.8 and the competing Bristol Type 148, quickly selecting the Westland aircraft for production and issuing a contract in September 1936.

The high-lift devices gave the Lysander a short take off and landing (STOL) performance much appreciated by the Special Duties pilots such as Squadron Leader Hugh Verity. The wings were equipped with automatic slats which lifted away from the leading edge as the airspeed decreased towards stalling speed. These slats controlled automatic flaps. Slow speed flight was therefore greatly simplified, "and it was possible to bring a Lysander down to land, if not like a lift, at least like an escalator". The inboard slats were connected to the flaps and to an air damper in the port wing which governed the speed at which the slats operated. The outboard slats operated independently and were not connected and each was fitted with an air damper. On a normal approach, the inboard slats and the flaps would begin to open when the airspeed has dropped to about 85 mph (74 kn; 137 km/h) and be approximately half down at 80 mph (70 kn; 130 km/h). The only control that the pilot has is a locking lever which he can set to lock the flaps down once they have been lowered automatically.

== Operational history ==
=== United Kingdom ===
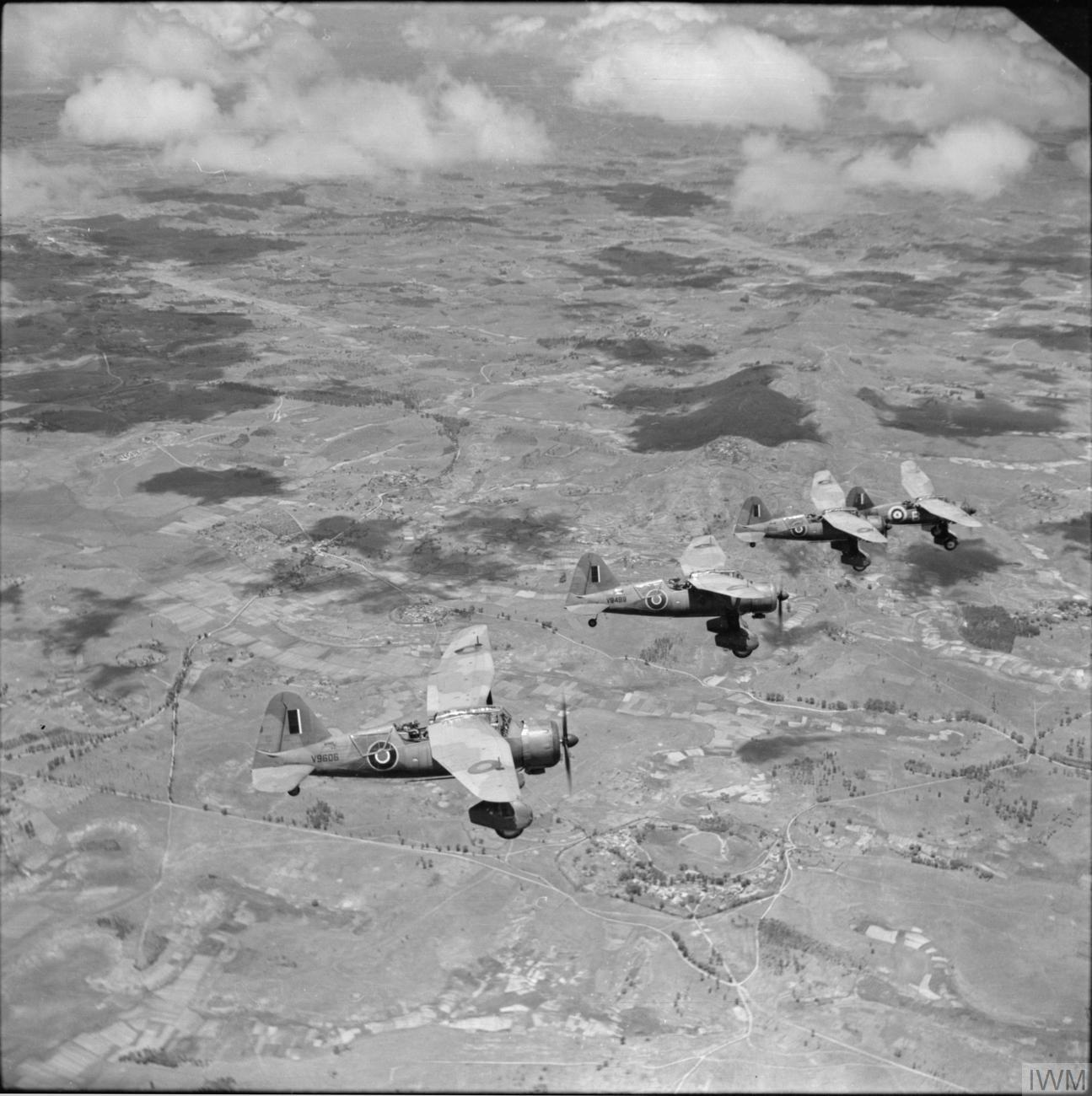
Lysander Mk.IIIAs of No. 1433 Flight RAF, over Madagascar in December 1942

The first Lysanders entered service in June 1938, equipping squadrons for army co-operation and were initially used for message-dropping and artillery spotting. When war broke out in Europe, the earlier Mk.Is had been largely replaced by Mk.IIs, the older machines heading for the Middle East. Some of these aircraft, now designated type L.1, operated with the Chindits of the British Indian Army in the Burma Campaign of the Second World War.

Four regular squadrons equipped with Lysanders accompanied the British Expeditionary Force to France in October 1939 and were joined by a further squadron early in 1940. Following the German invasion of France and the low countries on 10 May 1940, Lysanders were put into action as spotters and light bombers. In spite of occasional victories against German aircraft, they made very easy targets for the Luftwaffe even when escorted by Hurricanes. Withdrawn from France during the Dunkirk evacuation, they continued to drop supplies to Allied forces from bases in England; on one mission to supply troops trapped at Calais, 14 of 16 Lysanders and Hectors that set out were lost. Of 175 Lysanders that took part in the campaign, 118 were lost in or over France and Belgium in May and June 1940.

With the fall of France, it was clear that the type was unsuitable for coastal patrol and army co-operation, being described by Air Marshal Arthur Barratt, commander-in-chief of the British Air Forces in France as "quite unsuited to the task; a faster, less vulnerable aircraft was required." The view of army Air observation post (AOP) pilots was that the Lysander was too fast for artillery spotting purposes, too slow and un-manoeuvrable to avoid fighters, too big quickly to hide on a landing field, too heavy to use on soft ground and had been developed by the RAF without ever asking the army what was needed. Throughout the remainder of 1940, Lysanders flew dawn and dusk patrols off the coast and in the event of an invasion, they were to attack the landing beaches with light bombs and machine guns. They were replaced in the home-based army co-operation squadrons from 1941 by camera-equipped fighters such as the Curtiss Tomahawk and North American Mustang carrying out reconnaissance operations, while light aircraft such as the Taylorcraft Auster were used to direct artillery. Some British-based Lysanders flew air-sea rescue sorties, dropping dinghies to RAF aircrew in the English Channel. Fourteen squadrons and flights were formed for this in 1940 and 1941.

In India, 20 Squadron and 28 Squadron flying Lysanders were listed as non-operational but part of No. 221 Group RAF for army co-operation from Jamshedpur and Ranchi, respectively, on 1 July 1942.

==== Special duties ====
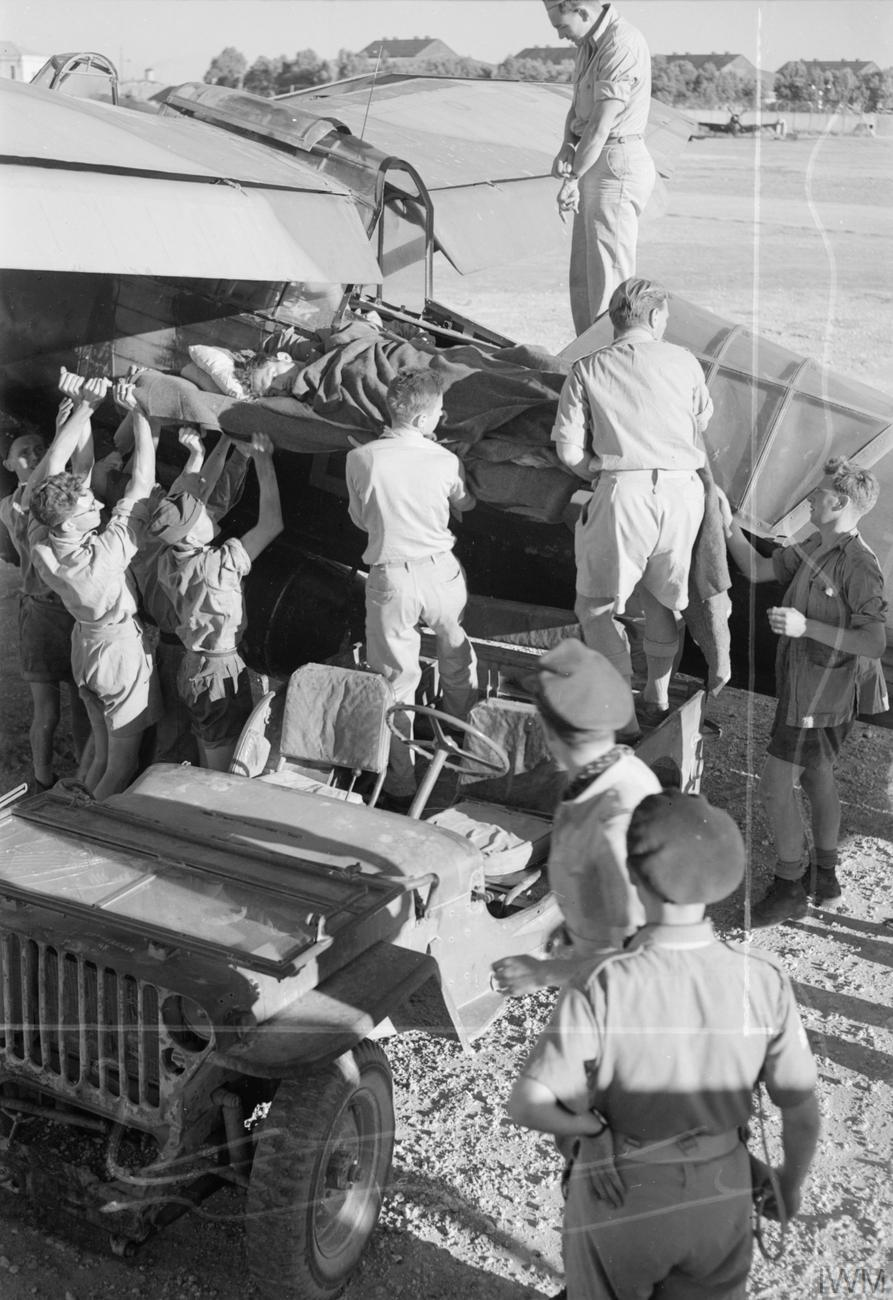
Lysander in Italy evacuating an American OSS officer

In August 1941 the new 138 (Special Duties) Squadron, was formed to undertake missions for the Special Operations Executive to maintain clandestine contact with the French Resistance. Among its aircraft were Lysander Mk.IIIs, that flew over and landed in occupied France. While general supply drops could be left to the rest of 138 Squadron aircraft, the Lysander could insert and remove agents from the continent or retrieve Allied aircrew that had evaded capture. Mk.IIIs were fitted with a fixed ladder over the port side to hasten access to the rear cockpit and a large drop tank under the belly. To slip in unobtrusively Lysanders were painted matte black overall (some early examples had brown/green camouflaged upper surfaces and later examples had grey/green upper surfaces). Operations almost always took place within a week of a full moon, as moonlight was essential for navigation. The aircraft undertook such duties until the liberation of France in 1944.

Lysanders were based at airfields at Newmarket in Suffolk and later Tempsford in Bedfordshire, but used regular RAF stations to fuel-up for the crossing, particularly RAF Tangmere. Flying without any navigation equipment other than a map and compass, Lysanders would land on short strips of land, such as fields, marked out by four or five torches or to avoid having to land, the agent, wearing a special padded suit, stepped off at very low altitude and rolled to a stop on the field. They were originally designed to carry one passenger in the rear cockpit but for SOE use, the rear cockpit of the Mk III (SD) version was modified to carry up to three passengers in case of emergency as they were fitted with a rearward facing bench for two passengers (with a locker underneath) and a shelf at the rear of the compartment which could also serve as a seat for a third passenger.

The pilots of 138 Squadron and from early 1942 161 Squadron, transported 101 agents to and recovered 128 agents from German-occupied Europe. The Germans knew little about the British aircraft and wished to study one. Soldiers captured an intact Lysander in March 1942 when its pilot was unable to destroy it after a crash but a train hit the truck carrying the Lysander, destroying the cargo.

In the Far East, from 1944 357 Squadron operated six SD Lysanders as C Flight for dropping agents in support of the Fourteenth Army in Burma.

Lysanders were also used as target-towing and communication aircraft. Two aircraft (T1443 and T1739) were transferred to the British Overseas Airways Corporation (BOAC) for training and 18 were used by the Fleet Air Arm. All British Lysanders were withdrawn from service in 1946.

=== Free French ===
Lysander also joined the ranks of the Forces Aériennes Françaises Libres (Free French Air Force, FAFL) when Groupe Mixte de Combat (GMC) 1, formed at RAF Odiham on 29 August 1940, was sent to French North-West Africa in order to persuade the authorities in countries such as Gabon, Cameroon and Chad, which were still loyal to Vichy France, to join the Gaullist cause against the Axis powers, and to attack Italian ground forces in Libya. As with all FAFL aircraft, Lysanders sported the Cross of Lorraine insignia on the fuselage and the wings instead of the French tricolour roundel first used in 1914, to distinguish their aircraft from those flying for the Vichy French Air Force. Lysanders were mostly employed on reconnaissance missions, but were also used to carry out occasional attacks. In all, 24 Lysanders were used by the FAFL.

=== Canada ===
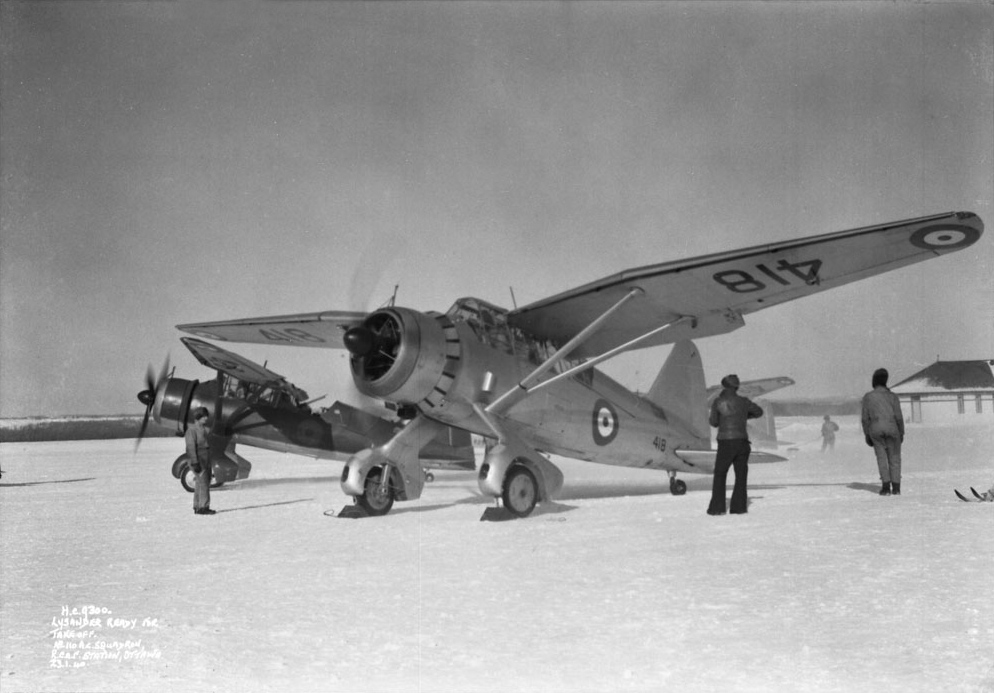
110 (AC) Squadron RCAF Lysander II in silver delivery scheme at RCAF Station Rockcliffe

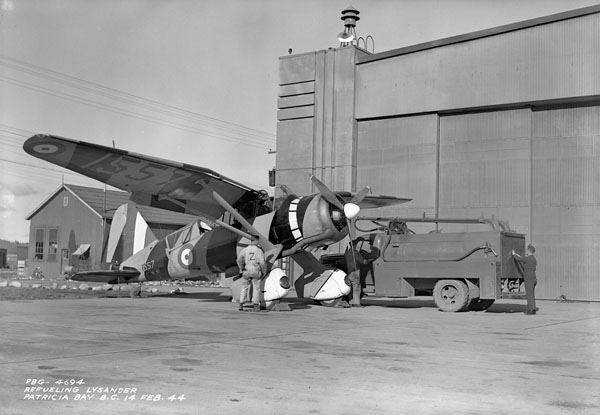
Lysander II.T target tug with black and yellow stripes

104 British-built Lysanders were delivered to Canada supplementing 225 that were built under licence by National Steel Car at Malton, Ontario (near Toronto) with production starting in October 1938 and the first aircraft flying in August 1939. The RCAF primarily operated Lysanders in the Army Co-operation role, where they represented a major improvement over the antiquated Westland Wapiti which could trace its origins back to 1916. Initial training was conducted at RCAF Station Rockcliffe (near Ottawa, Ontario) with No. 123 Squadron running an army co-operation school there. Units that operated the Lysander for training in this role in Canada include 2 Squadron, 110 Squadron (which became 400 Squadron overseas) and No. 112 Squadron RCAF.

414 squadron formed overseas and joined 110 Squadron and 112 Squadron with Lysanders. Prior to going overseas 2 Squadron was disbanded and its airmen reassigned to 110 and 112 Squadrons to bring them up to war establishment (2 Squadron later reformed in England as a Hurricane unit and was renumbered as 402 Squadron). In all there were three squadrons ready to begin operations against the Axis powers. Although Operation Sea Lion – the planned German invasion of Great Britain – was averted by the British victory in the Battle of Britain in 1940, the high losses suffered by RAF Lysanders in the Battle of France resulted in any plans for cross-channel offensive operations by Lysanders stopped, although the Canadian squadrons continued training with the Lysanders until suitable replacements were available.

No. 118 Squadron and No. 122 Squadron RCAF were the only Canadian units to use their Lysanders on active-duty operations – 118 in Saint John, New Brunswick, and 122 at various locations on Vancouver Island, where they performed anti-submarine patrols and conducted search-and-rescue operations. During the same period, No. 121 Squadron RCAF and several Operational Training Units (OTUs) used Lysanders – painted in a high-visibility yellow-and-black-striped scheme – for target towing duties.

For a brief period in 1940 when every available Hurricane fighter had been sent overseas to fight in the Battle of Britain, leaving the RCAF without a modern fighter aircraft at home in Canada, two RCAF Lysander-equipped squadrons which were supposed to convert to fighter aircraft but had none to convert to were re-designated as operational fighter squadrons. 111 Squadron, a coastal artillery squadron which earlier had replaced its Avro trainers with Lysanders and been reclassified as an army co-operation unit, was again reclassified as a fighter squadron – the only one on the Canadian west coast – in June 1940. Lysander-equipped 118 Squadron was also converted to a fighter squadron. The Lysander completely lacked the capability to operate in a fighter role, and neither squadron saw action as a fighter unit while equipped with Lysanders, but their designation as fighter squadrons did allow RCAF fighter pilots to work up at a critical time without having to wait for the arrival of true fighter aircraft. No. 118 Squadron was disbanded in September 1940, and when it reformed in December 1940, still as a fighter squadron, it was equipped with 15 old, otherwise unwanted Grumman Goblin fighters produced by Canadian Car and Foundry. Both 111 and 118 Squadrons soon re-equipped with the Curtiss P-40 Kittyhawk, bringing the brief service of Lysanders in fighter squadrons to an end. By late 1944 all Canadian Lysanders had been withdrawn from flying duties.

=== Other countries ===
Other export customers for the Lysander included the Finnish Air Force (which received four Mk.I and nine Mk.III aircraft), the Irish Air Corps (which took delivery of six Mk.II aircraft), the Turkish Air Force (which received 36 Mk.IIs), the Portuguese Air Force (which took delivery of eight Mk.IIIA aircraft), the United States Army Air Forces (which received 25), the Indian Air Force (which took delivery of 22) and No. 1 Squadron of the Royal Egyptian Air Force. The REAF received 20 aircraft. Egyptian Lysanders were the last to see active service, against Israel in the 1947–1949 Palestine war.

=== Civilian use ===
After the war surplus ex-Royal Canadian Air Force Lysanders were employed as aerial applicators with Westland Dusting Service, operating in Alberta and western Canada. Two of these were saved for inclusion in Lynn Garrison's collection for display in Calgary, Alberta, Canada.

== Production ==
A total of 1,786 Lysanders were built, including 225 manufactured under licence by National Steel Car in Malton near Toronto, Ontario, Canada during 1938 and 1939.

== Variants ==
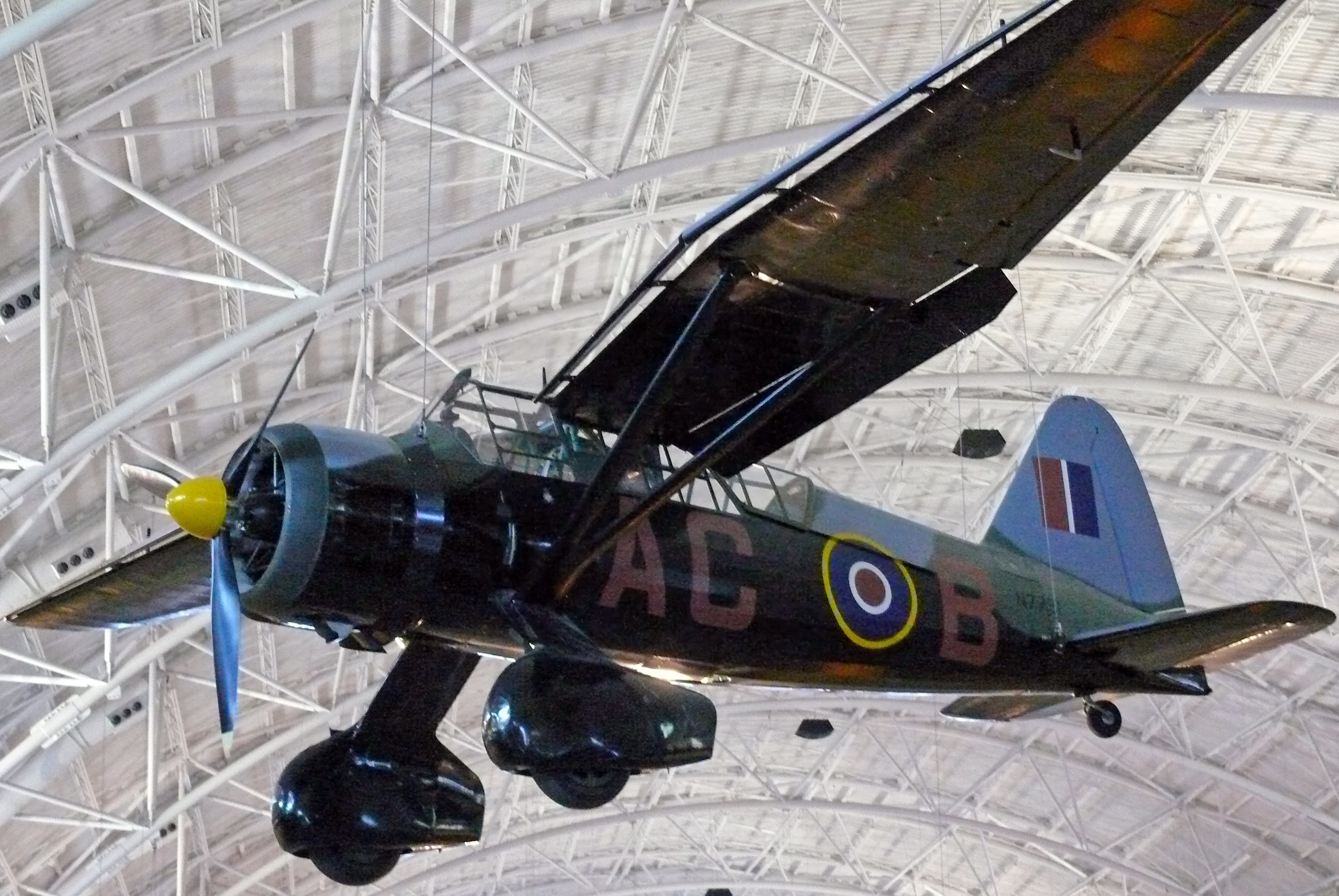
Lysander IIIA at the Steven F. Udvar-Hazy Center near Washington D.C., US

Lysander Mk.I
Powered by a 890 hp (660 kW) Bristol Mercury XII radial piston engine. Two forward-firing 0.303 in (7.7 mm) Browning machine guns in wheel fairings and one pintle-mounted 0.303 in (7.7 mm) Lewis or Vickers K machine gun in rear cockpit. Optional spat-mounted stub wings carried 500 lb (230 kg) of bombs. Four 20 lb (9.1 kg) bombs could be carried under rear fuselage.
Lysander TT Mk.I
Lysander Mk.Is converted into target tugs.
Lysander Mk.II
Powered by one 905 hp (675 kW) Bristol Perseus XII sleeve valve radial piston engine.
Lysander TT Mk.II
Target tug conversion of the Lysander Mk.II.
Lysander Mk.III
Powered by a 870 hp (650 kW) Bristol Mercury XX or 30 radial piston engine, 350 delivered from July 1940. Twin 0.303 in (7.7 mm) Browning guns in rear cockpit.
Lysander Mk.IIIA
As Lysander Mk.I, with Mercury 20 engine. Twin 0.303 in (7.7 mm) Lewis guns in rear cockpit.
Lysander Mk.III SCW (Special Contract Westland)
Special version for clandestine operations. No armament, long-range 150 gallon fuel tank, fixed external ladder.
Lysander TT Mk.III
Lysander Mk.Is, Mk.IIs and Mk.IIIs converted into target tugs.
Lysander TT Mk.IIIA
100 purpose-built target tugs.
P.12 Delanne Lysander
The P.12, also sometimes referred to as the Lysander Mk.V or Wendover, was a rebuild of the prototype Lysander K6127 with a Delanne configuration tandem rear wing to carry a four-gun power-operated tail gun turret. According to the A&AEE trials report from Boscombe Down: "The principle was merely an experiment to determine whether it was possible to provide really adequate rear defence on small aircraft without destroying the general flying characteristics." The installation of a dorsal (Boulton Paul) gun turret had been mocked up but the movement of the centre of gravity aft was a concern which led to the investigation of the use of a Delanne tailplane which would provide 50% of the lift and allow for wide C-of-G range. Petter and Harald Penrose consulted Maurice Delanne, and Penrose flew the Delanne 20T in spring 1940 after which Petter drew up a design. The rear fuselage was altered into a wider one of constant cross section. Mounted low on the fuselage was the tail surface with twin tail fins replacing the central fin. This left room for a gun turret just aft of the rear wing. Both Frazer Nash and Boulton-Paul turrets were considered but only a ballasted dummy with no power system was installed. The main wing and forward fuselage remained unchanged.
"Pregnant Perch"
L6473 adapted with a ventral gun position, resulting in a bulged fuselage belly, for beach strafing. During testing in June 1940 an engine failure led to a force landing and the aircraft ended up "with its nose in a ditch". (Note: The landing was made uphill and avoiding high tension power lines) In 1940 K6127 was tested with a pair of 20 mm (0.79 in) Oerlikon cannon mounted on top of the wheel fairings and the stub wings removed; the intention was to use the aircraft against invasion barges in Operation Sealion.

== Operators ==
- Australia
- British India
- Canada
- Egypt
- Finland
- Free France
- Ireland
- Poland
- Portugal
- South Africa
- Turkey
- UK
- United States

== Surviving aircraft ==
Lysanders are preserved in museums in Canada, the United Kingdom, the United States, Belgium, and India.

Belgium

- T1562 or V9562 – Lysander TT III on static display at the Royal Museum of the Armed Forces and Military History in Brussels. Previously registered as OO-SOP, it was restored from 1983 to 1988, and again by December 2010 following a forced landing.

Canada

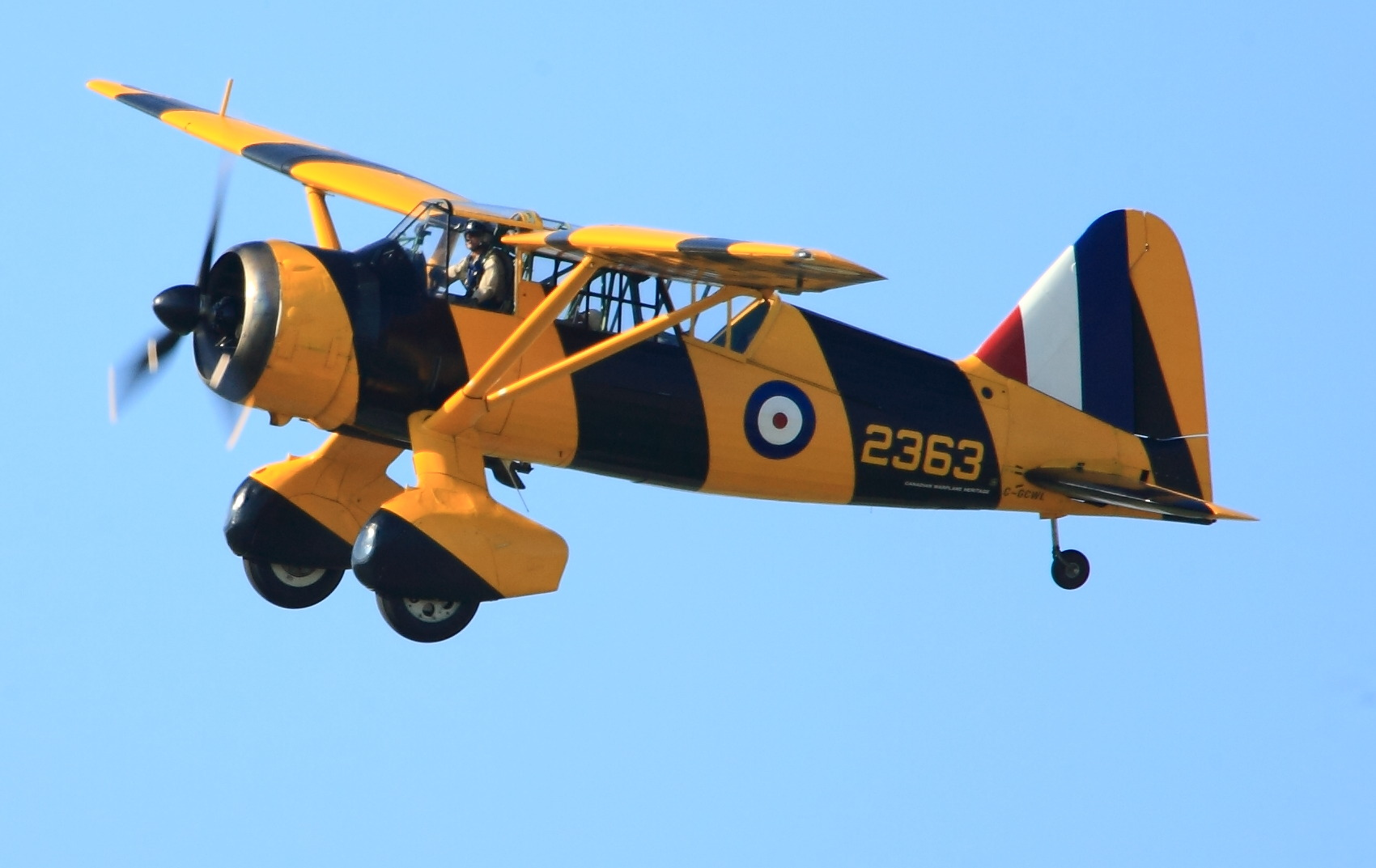
Lysander Mk.III flown by the Canadian Warplane Heritage Museum, 2010

- RCAF 2349 – Lysander III on display at the Canadian Museum of Flight in Langley, British Columbia. It is displayed without most of its fabric covering. This one was restored for Expo 86 in Vancouver, British Columbia. The wings came from Cliff Douglas in Coutenay, B.C. The fuselage was found in the Prairies. The first fuselage was destroyed en route to British Columbia in a vehicle accident and another one was obtained.
- RCAF 2363 – Lysander IIIA owned and flown by the Canadian Warplane Heritage Museum in Hamilton, Ontario. It flew for the first time following its restoration a few weeks before the museum's Flyfest on 20–21 June 2009. It is finished in a yellow & black 'bumblebee' target tug scheme.
- RCAF 2365 – Lysander IIIA airworthy at the Vintage Wings of Canada in Gatineau, Quebec. It is painted in No. 400 "City of Toronto" RCAF Squadron markings, and is doped silver overall with RCAF serial number 416. After a full restoration, it first flew 18 June 2010 in Gatineau, QC.
- RCAF 2445 – Lysander IIIA in storage at the Reynolds-Alberta Museum in Wetaskiwin, Alberta.
- Lysander III on static display at the Canada Aviation and Space Museum in Ottawa, Ontario. This example was a composite, restored from three aircraft by the RCAF as a centennial project in 1967 and is painted in the early war temperate land scheme (dark earth and dark green over sky).

India

- Lysander IIIA on static display at the Indian Air Force Museum in Palam, Delhi. Formerly RCAF 1589, it is painted in spurious colours. It is possible that this is the one that Canada traded for a B-24 Liberator bomber in the late 1960s.

United Kingdom

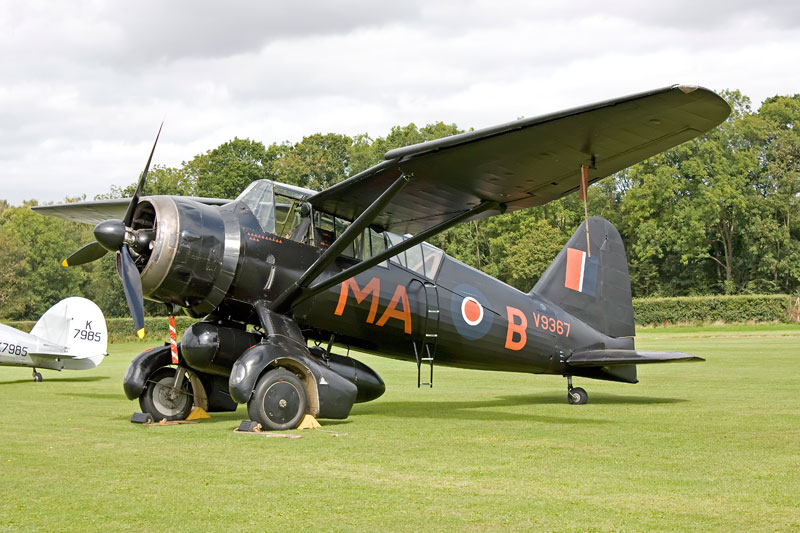
Lysander V9552 owned by the Shuttleworth Collection during an air show, 2009

- RCAF 2442 – Lysander IIIA purchased by The Fighter Collection, Duxford, UK in December 2024.
- R9125 – Lysander III on static display at the Royal Air Force Museum London. It is painted in the early war brown and green temperate land scheme marked JR-M R9125 of No. 225 Squadron RAF.
- V9552 – Airworthy as of 2019 as part of The Shuttleworth Collection, Old Warden, Bedfordshire in the UK. It is currently painted in the all black scheme of the clandestine Special Duties aircraft of No.161 Squadron RAF, bearing the serial V9367 (flown by Pilot Officer Peter Vaughan-Fowler, DSO, DFC and bar, AFC.)
- V9312 – Airworthy as of 2019 following restoration to flight by the Aircraft Restoration Company at Imperial War Museum Duxford. Flew in August 2018 for the first time since 1944. A Westland-built example, manufactured in 1940. Currently painted in the livery of No. 225 squadron RAF, with whom the plane served in wartime. Apparently now in the process of being certified to carry paying passengers.
- Lysander IIIA on static display at the Imperial War Museum Duxford in Duxford, Cambridgeshire. It is painted as MA-J V9673 flown by Hugh Verity also of No. 161 Squadron RAF.

United States

- RCAF 2346 – Lysander IIIA on static display at the Steven F. Udvar-Hazy Center of the National Air and Space Museum in Chantilly, Virginia. It is painted in a night finish with grey and green topsides, and marked as AC-B N7791, a No. 138 Squadron RAF aircraft famous for spy-dropping missions in wartime Europe.
- Lysander IIIA on display at the Florida Air Museum in Lakeland, Florida. On loan from the Fantasy of Flight in Polk City, Florida. It is painted in a temperate sea scheme (extra dark sea grey and dark slate grey over sky) and marked as BA-C serial V9545. It was previously owned by Wessex Aviation and Transport.

== In popular culture ==
In 1963, BBC TV transmitted a series of dramas called Moonstrike about the insertion of clandestine SOE operatives into occupied France. The first episode featured a reconstruction of a typical Lysander operation.

== Specifications (Lysander Mk.III) ==
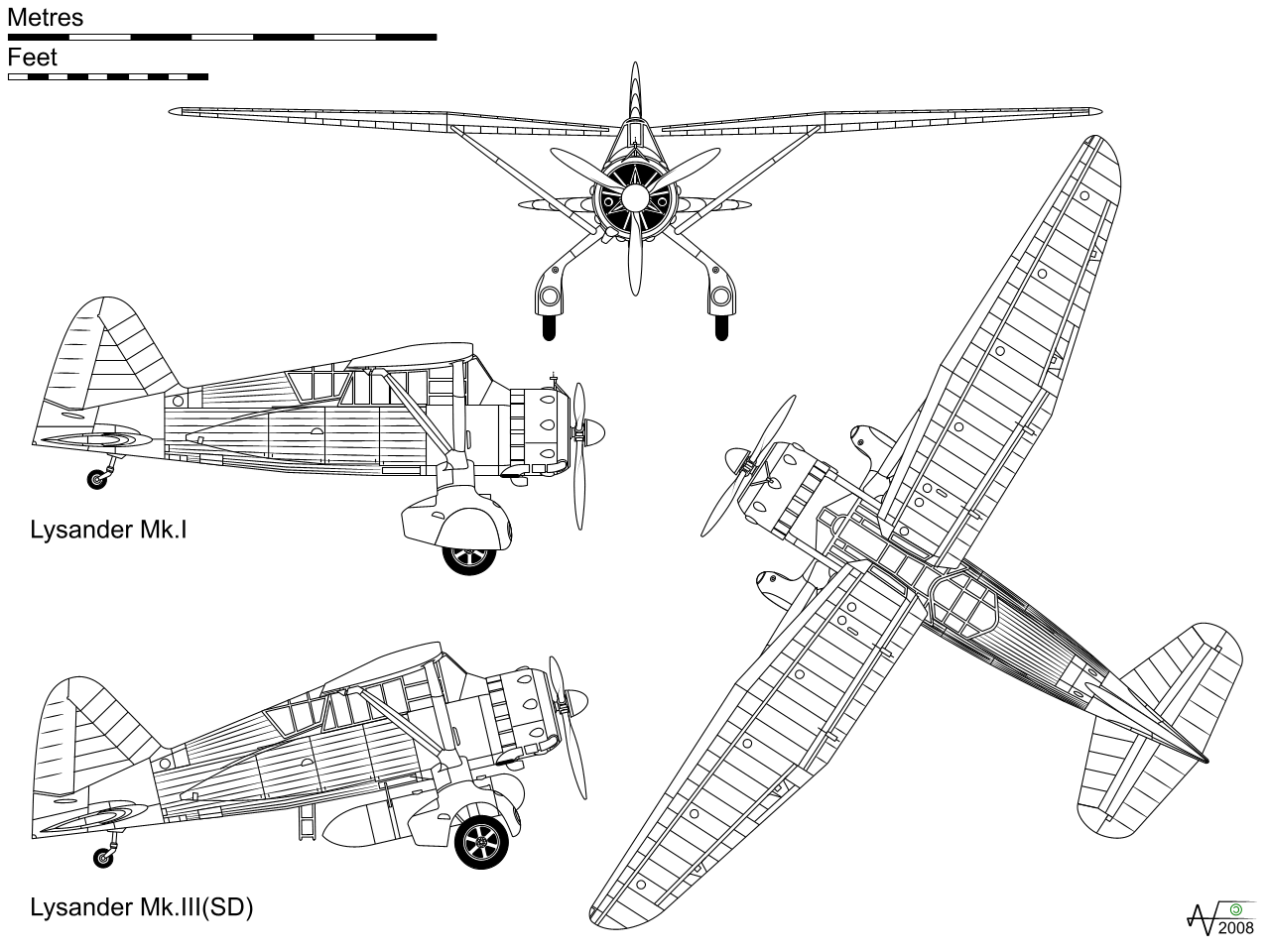
Lysander Mk.I drawing, with additional side view of Mk.III (SD) covert operations aircraft

Data from Westland Aircraft since 1915

General characteristics

- Crew: 2 (1 pilot, 1 pass.)
- Length: 30 ft 6 in (9.30 m)
- Wingspan: 50 ft 0 in (15.24 m)
- Height: 14 ft 6 in (4.42 m)
- Wing area: 260 sq ft (24 m^{2})
- Airfoil: RAF 34 modified
- Empty weight: 4,365 lb (1,980 kg)
- Max takeoff weight: 6,330 lb (2,871 kg)
- Powerplant: 1 × Bristol Mercury XX 9-cylinder air-cooled radial piston engine, 870 hp (650 kW)
- Propellers: 3-bladed

Performance

- Maximum speed: 212 mph (341 km/h, 184 kn) at 5,000 ft (1,500 m)
- Stall speed: 65 mph (105 km/h, 56 kn)
- Range: 600 mi (970 km, 520 nmi)
- Service ceiling: 21,500 ft (6,600 m)
- Time to altitude: 10,000 ft (3,000 m) in 8 minutes
- Take-off distance to 50 ft (15 m): 915 ft (279 m)

Armament

- Guns: 2 × forward-firing .303 in (7.7 mm) Browning machine guns in wheel fairings and two more for the observer.
- Bombs: 4 × 20 lb (9 kg) HE bombs on a Light Series carrier or 1 × 150 imp gal tank (on MK IIIA SD) under rear fuselage and/or 500 lb (227 kg) of bombs (Note: Four 120 lb GP bombs or two 250lb HE bombs) on undercarriage stub wing hardpoints (if fitted)

== See also ==
Aircraft of comparable role, configuration, and era

- Curtiss O-52 Owl
- Douglas O-46
- Fieseler Fi 156 Storch
- Henschel Hs 126
- Kokusai Ki-76
- LWS-3 Mewa
- Mitsubishi Ki-15
- North American O-47
- Polikarpov Po-2
- Stinson Reliant
- Stinson L-1 Vigilant
- Levente II (ones used in army co-operation and liaison tasks)

Related lists

- List of aircraft of World War II
- List of aircraft of the Royal Air Force
- List of aircraft of the Fleet Air Arm
- List of aircraft of Canada's air forces
- List of military aircraft of Finland
- List of aircraft of the Royal Australian Air Force
- List of military aircraft of the United States
