= Peyret Tandem =

Single-seat French glider, 1922

General information
- Type: single seat tandem wing glider
- National origin: France
- Manufacturer: Louis Peyret
- Designer: Louis Peyret

History
- First flight: 1922

The Peyret Tandem or Peyret Alérion, was a French single seat glider of tandem wing configuration. It won first prize at the first British Glider Competition of 1922.

== Design and development ==
Louis Peyret, who had unsuccessfully attempted to fly the Blériot III floatplane and had designed the Blériot VI, a tandem wing aircraft, was a friend of Louis Blériot. His post-World War I glider was a true tandem wing aircraft with two identical pairs of straight edged, constant chord high mounted wings, swept at 5°. Both also had 5° of dihedral but the front wing was mounted at a larger angle of incidence than the rear for longitudinal stability, as is the tailplane in a conventional aircraft. The wings were built up around tubular Duraluminum spars and braced with N-shaped lift struts, also Duraluminum but with wooden fairings, which ran from the lower fuselage longerons to mid-span.

The fuselage was built around spruce longerons and struts with some plywood frames and covered with stress bearing 3-ply mahogany about 2.4 mm (0.094 in) thick. Unusually, there were five main longerons. In the central region of the fuselage four of them defined a deep rectangle but the upper two came towards each other together rearwards producing an isosceles trapezoidal section. A fifth longeron ran centrally above them, positioned so that the overall fuselage section was an isosceles triangle at the rear. Further forward, as the upper longerons separated, the fuselage had five flat faces. The side faces came together at the nose to form a vertical knife-edge and the bottom face curved upwards. The open cockpit was formed by a break in the upper skinning, though the fifth, upper, longeron continued over the pilot's head. Near the cockpit the upper skins were dished inwards to improve the pilot's view.

At the rear, above the second wing, was a small triangular fin which carried a rudder that extended to the bottom of the fuselage. The Peyret had a wider track and more refined undercarriage than many of the Itford gliders, with wheels on a single axle mounted below the fuselage on a combination of rubber shock absorbers and radius arms from the forward fuselage.

The control system was unusual. Both front and rear wings carried full-span control surfaces operated by a control column. Sideways movement of the column made the surfaces on both front and rear wings act together as conventional ailerons. Forward movement of the column lowered the control surfaces on the rear wing, as with conventional elevators, but also raised those on the front wing. Thus the tail was raised and the nose depressed. The rudder was operated by a conventional rudder bar.

== Operational history ==
In August 1922 the Daily Mail newspaper offered a £1,000 prize for the longest duration flight by an unpowered, heavier than air aircraft. The competition was to be organized by the Royal Aero Club, who chose the site (Itford Hill, on the Sussex South Downs near Lewes) and the date (16–21 October). This gave competitors six weeks to design, build and transport their entries. 13 arrived in time and one of these was the Peyret tandem wing glider, competition number 2, to be flown Alex Maneyrol. This unusual aircraft was the competition winner.

Alex Maneyrol did not fly the Peyret Tandem until the final day of the Itford competition, Saturday 21 October. F. P. Raynham's flight of 133 min, made on the Tuesday, then stood as the longest flight but at about 14:30 Maneyrol launched into brisk winds and first exceeded Raynham's time then bettered the current world record of 186 minutes. He finally landed in the dusk, with the help of assembled car headlights, after a flight lasting just over 201 minutes which won Peyret and Maneyrol the Daily Mail £1,000 prize.

Contemporary reports of the flight remarked on the combination of flight steadiness and controllability of the Peyret in the winds, "quick on the controls and rapid in its manoeuvres" and capable of "short, sharp turns".

After Itford Maneyrol increased the world glider duration record in the Peyret Tandem to 485 minutes at Vauville on 23 January 1923. He died later that year when his powered Peyret aircraft, a conventional monoplane, broke up at the Lympne light aircraft trials.

An additional Peyret Tandem (or perhaps the original one refurbished) was supplied to the Royal Aircraft Establishment in 1923, bearing serial number J7128.

== Specifications ==
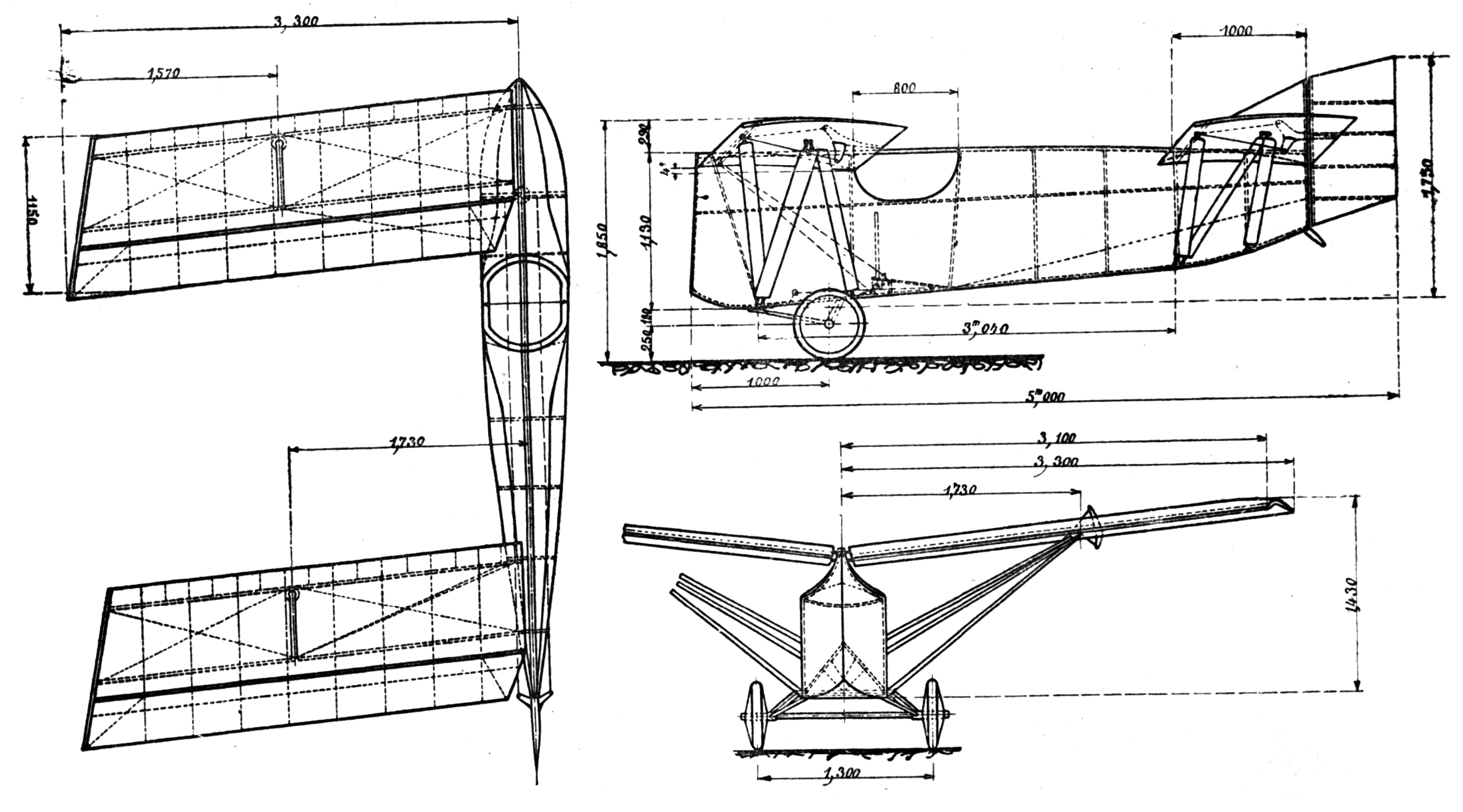
Peyret Tandem 3-view drawing from L'Aerophile November,1922

Data from Flight October 1922

General characteristics

- Capacity: 1
- Length: 5.33 m (17 ft 6 in)
- Wingspan: 6.60 m (21 ft 8 in) both wings
- Wing area: 7.11 m^{2} (76.5 sq ft) gross, each wing
- Aspect ratio: 6.1
- Empty weight: 67 kg (148 lb)
