= Tandem wing =

Aircraft with multiple sets of wings

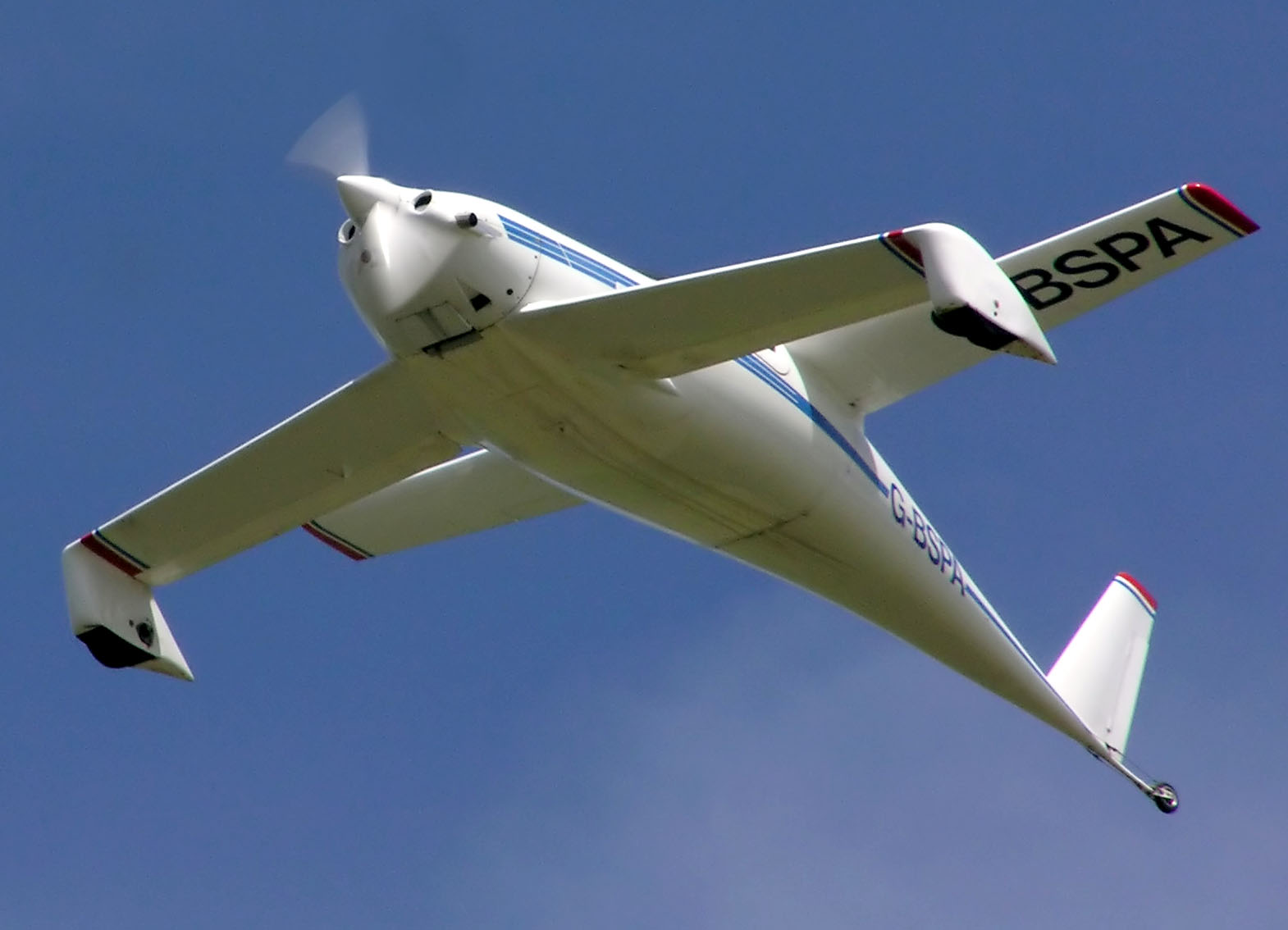
QAC Quickie Q2

A tandem wing is a wing configuration in which a flying craft or animal has two or more sets of wings set one behind another. All the wings contribute to lift.

The tandem wing is distinct from the biplane in which the wings are stacked one above another, or from the canard or "tail-first" configuration where the forward surface is much smaller and does not contribute significantly to the overall lift.

In aviation, tandem wings have long been experimented with, but few designs have ever been put into production.

Tandem wings in nature occur only in insects and flying fish, although in the past there have been tandem-wing flying reptiles.

== Design principles ==
A tandem wing configuration has two main wing planes, with one located forward and the other to the rear. The difference is greater than the wing chord, so there is a clear gap between them and the aircraft centre of gravity (CG) lies between the wings. Compared to the conventional layout, where the tailplane exerts little or no vertical force in cruising flight, both tandem wings contribute substantially to lift.

The basic tandem configuration uses wings which are equal in size and in line with each other. Examples have flown successfully, such as the Peyret glider of 1922. However the rear wing is usually placed either above or below the fore wing, in order to avoid its turbulent wake. One wing is often made a little smaller than the other, according to the details of the design. Indeed, there are no clear dividing lines between the conventional vs. tandem, or the tandem vs. canard configurations. The high-mounted fore wing and low-mounted aft wing arrangement is also sometimes treated as an extreme staggered biplane and referred to as the Nenadović biplane.

Interference effects between the two wings can make a tandem layout less efficient in cruise than the equivalent conventional design, however examples such as the Scaled Composites Proteus are capable of exceptional efficiency.

The tandem layout creates a "slot effect" in which the front wing deflects air downwards over the rear wing, reducing the angle of attack (AoA) of the rear. At high aircraft AoA, this causes the front wing to stall first, allowing safer flight at low speeds than the equivalent conventional layout. It also offers good STOL performance.

Tandem wings have also been used on ground-effect vehicles, where the front wing is used to direct air downwards beneath the rear wing to create a lifting air cushion.

=== Stability, control and trim ===
In a tandem wing the lift forces on the two wings are separated longitudinally, allowing them to act together to achieve stability, control and trim. The mechanisms of stability and control for a tandem wing are similar to those for the tail-first or canard layout; the distinction is mainly in the relative size of the forward surface.

However, the larger trim forces available compared to a smaller tailplane or foreplane mean that a tandem design can offer a greater range of trim conditions, and hence of centre of gravity (CG) location than other layouts, which can offer a practical solution where weight loadings and distributions may vary during operations. However a wide CG range leads to other problems, including a compatible undercarriage layout and safe stalling characteristics.

=== Joined wing ===
The joined wing is a tandem-wing layout in which the front wing sweeps back and/or the rear wing sweeps forwards such that they join at or near the tips to form a continuous surface in a hollow diamond or triangle shape. The joined wing is also an example of a closed wing.

The Ligeti Stratos is a rare example to have flown.

=== Structural design ===
In a conventional layout, the moment arm of the outer section's lifting load is large, and this stresses the root section. However, in a tandem design each wing is smaller and the outer load is absent. This allows the wing structure to be lighter overall.

In a conventional design, the fuselage is supported only in one place, with the fore and aft fuselage sections cantilevered out from it. This creates significant bending stresses. A tandem wing supports the same fuselage in two places, reducing the bending stresses. However the torsion stresses on the centre section between the wings are greater.

Because it is more compact, the tandem-wing structure is stiffer overall, meaning that less allowance needs to be made for bending, and a smaller safety margin in stress levels is possible, allowing yet further weight and cost reduction.

== History ==
=== Pioneers ===
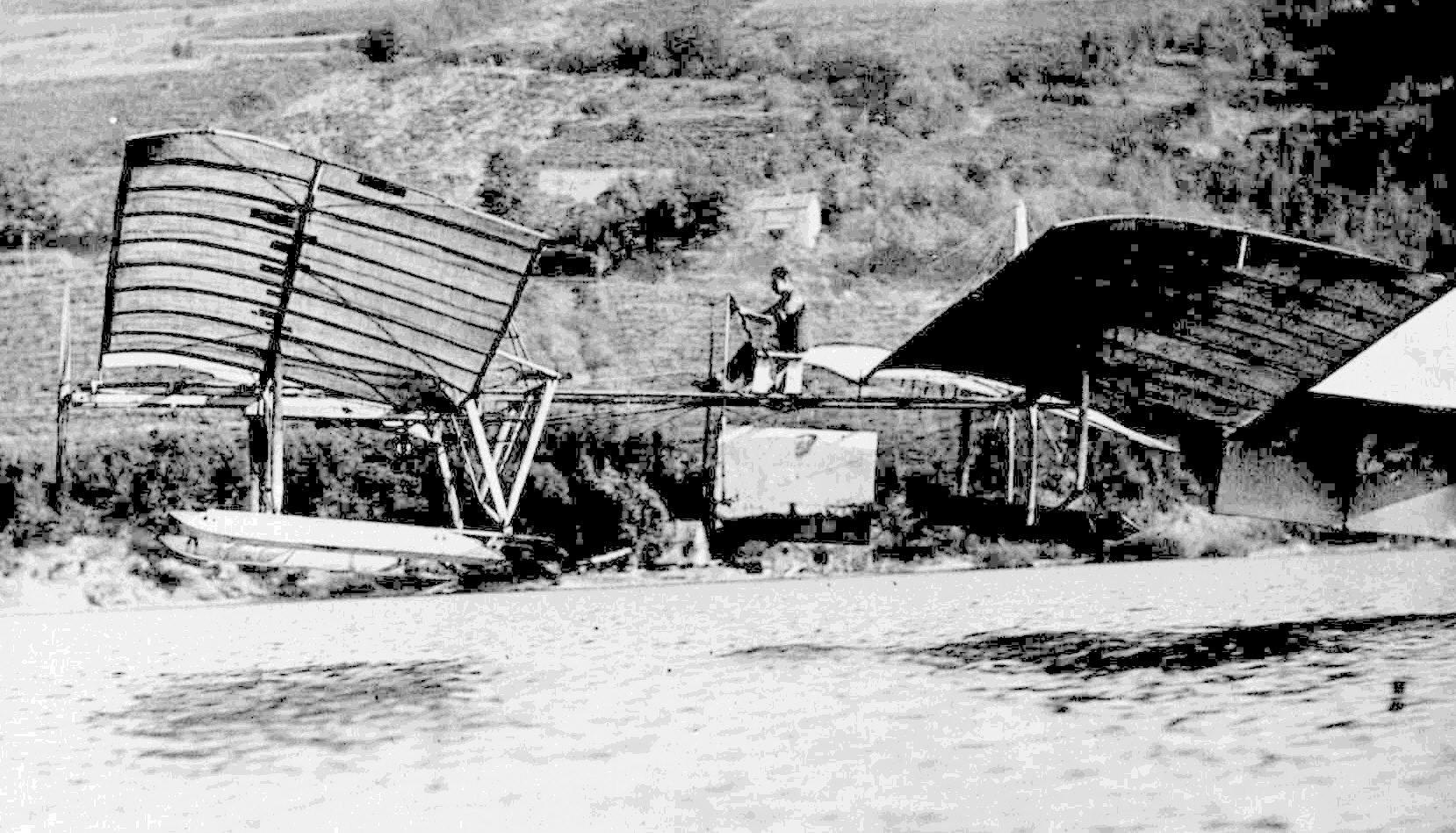
Langley Aerodrome, modified (1914)

The tandem wing configuration predates successful crewed flight. As far back as the fifteenth century, Tito Livio Burattini experimented with a tandem-wing model. Four sets of wings in tandem variously provided lift and propulsion, and Burraitni's cat became the first aeronaut to fly in a tandem design.

Having also flown simpler fore-and-aft tandem models of up to 14 feet (4.3 m) in span, in 1903 Samuel Pierpont Langley built a full-size tandem-wing monoplane, the Aerodrome, and launched it from the roof of a houseboat. It failed to fly. After his death the Smithsonian Institution sought to prove that he had flown in the weeks before the Wright brothers, and employed successful planemaker Glenn Curtiss to secretly modify the aerodrome until it could fly, as "proof" that it had flown in 1903. Curtiss added floats and made other improvements, enabling it to undertake short hops as a true waterplane in 1914. The ruse was eventually exposed, yet the Smithsonian still sought to claim that the 1902 version had been "capable of flight". It would be many more years before they recanted.

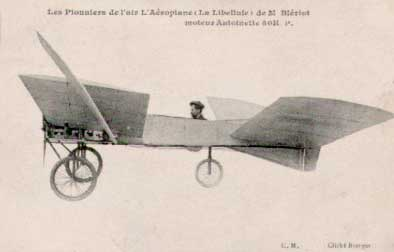
Blériot VI Libellule (1907)

Several pioneers had long made successful gliders. In 1905 John J. Montgomery flew a tandem monoplane glider, confirming that the aerodynamic principle was sound.

Powered flight followed two years later. In 1906 Louis Blériot built his third aeroplane with tandem elliptical closed wings, later modifying it as his type IV with the fore wing converted into a conventional biplane. But it was not until the next year that his type VI, a wheeled tandem monoplane of broadly similar configuration to Langley's Aerodrome, became the first tandem-wing aeroplane to fly.

Between 1907 and 1911, the aerodynamics studies of Gustave Eiffel showed that the tandem layout was inherently less aerodynamically efficient that the more conventional. Overlapping with Eiffel's work, Stefan Drzewiecki developed and wind-tunnel tested an inherently stable tandem-wing design. He then built and successfully flew a full-sized example at the end of 1912.

=== Interwar period ===
Experimental tandem-wing aircraft continued to be built after World War I.

The Caproni Ca.60 prototype flying boat comprised a long passenger-carrying hull to which were attached in tandem three stacks of triplane wings from the successful Ca.4 line of heavy bombers and airliners, earning it the nickname "Capronissimo". However it broke up on its first attempted takeoff in 1921.

The first fully controllable tandem-wing type was the French-built Peyret tandem glider, which won the first British gliding competition in 1922. Peyret's novel control system comprised full-span trailing edge surfaces on all four wings. These operated in pairs on each side as ailerons, in pairs fore and aft as elevators, and synchronously as flaps for low-speed flight. The system proved effective and, despite the glider being less efficient than the conventional high-aspect-ratio entries, it proved more controllable and manoeuvrable. This enabled the pilot M. Maneyrol to remain in updraughts for longer than the others. Although Peyret continued to develop the design, in both gliders and powered types, they remained a curiosity.

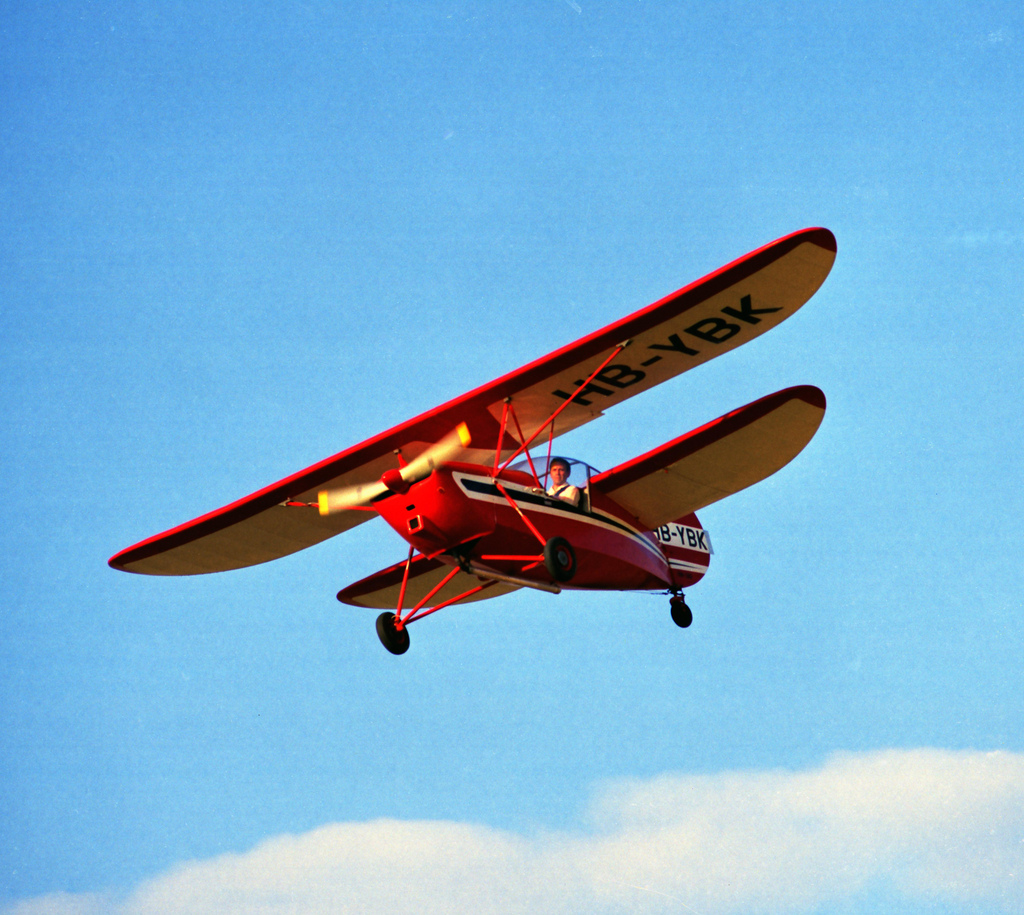
A Mignet Pou-du-Ciel

The SFCA continued the work of Peyret after he died, adopting his control system. Their Taupin first flew in 1933. Its design proved practical and some 52 examples were produced.

Meanwhile Henri Mignet was taking a very different approach to flight control. Intended for amateurs to build at home, his Pou-du-Ciel (flying flea) had a novel two-axis control system to make it easy to fly. No ailerons were needed because when the rudder was operated, yaw-roll coupling ensured that the plane banked into a turn. For pitch control the whole front wing tilted to act as a canard elevator. Introduced at much the same time as the Taupin, it became a craze, hundreds were built and variations developed in many countries. However stability issues relating to the variable front wing could lead to lethal crashes in the hands of the novice pilot, and the type eventually fell out of favour.

=== World War II period ===
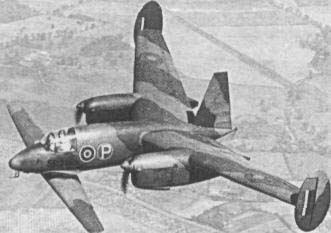
The Miles M.39B Libellula performed well but the requirement for its successor was cancelled.

During the late 1930s, Maurice Delanne was working on tandem-wing designs. He proposed a fighter, the Delanne 10, featuring a gulled forward wing and twin fins on the tips of the low-set and slightly shorter-span rear wing. He first built two examples of a smaller aerodynamic test aircraft, the Delanne 20-T, which flew in 1938. The Arsenal de l'Aéronautique then constructed a prototype fighter, the Arsenal-Delanne 10. It was completed and test-flown after the German invasion of France, and was then taken to Germany for further testing.

Meanwhile Westland Aircraft were considering a modification of the Lysander light observation and liaison aircraft, by adding a rear gun turret to give it some protection from attack. The Lysander already had a suitable main wing, so to support the weight of the turret Westland thought of adding a Delanne-type rear wing. By now hostilities had started but France had not yet fallen. Chief Designer W. E. W. "Teddy" Petter and Chief Test Pilot Harald Penrose flew to Paris, where Penrose flew one of the 20-Ts and reported favourably on its handling. The tandem Lysander was not completed until 1941, when Penrose began test flights. Although it performed flawlessly – he wrote that "here was a military prototype that needed no alteration" – it was not ordered into production.

George Miles saw the tandem Lysander at RAF Boscombe Down and realised its potential as a short-span, short-take-off Naval fighter. The ensuing Miles M.35 Libellula test aircraft differed from the Delanne design in having wings of approximately equal span, but with the rear wing given a longer chord and swept back. Although the design was rejected, it flew well enough to prompt development of the larger M.39B, a subscale test aircraft for the proposed M.39 high-speed bomber to meet Specification B.11/41. This time the fore wing was smaller and mounted low, while the swept rear wing was high-mounted with twin engine nacelles slung beneath. Flying in 1943 it performed well, but the bomber requirement was subsequently cancelled.

=== Postwar ===
After WWII, interest returned to the Flying Flea's tilting forewing concept and, with its worst dangers now understood and fixed, designers have continued to develop the idea, typically still for home construction.

The Curtiss-Wright X-19 of 1963 marked the entry of the tandem wing configuration into the VTOL arena, as a quadrotor convertiplane, with large tilting proprotors mounted on each wing tip. It proved overly complex and unreliable for the technology of the day.

Other tandem approaches such as the Delanne were largely forgotten, until David Lockspeiser conceived of his Land Development Aircraft, a low-cost utility transport. It was to utilise three interchangeable wing component; one each mounted high up for the left and right rear wings, and a third fore wing mounted centrally beneath the nose. His prototype LDA-01 flew in 1971. It proved successful enough to develop for production, but the project ended before it could be modified.

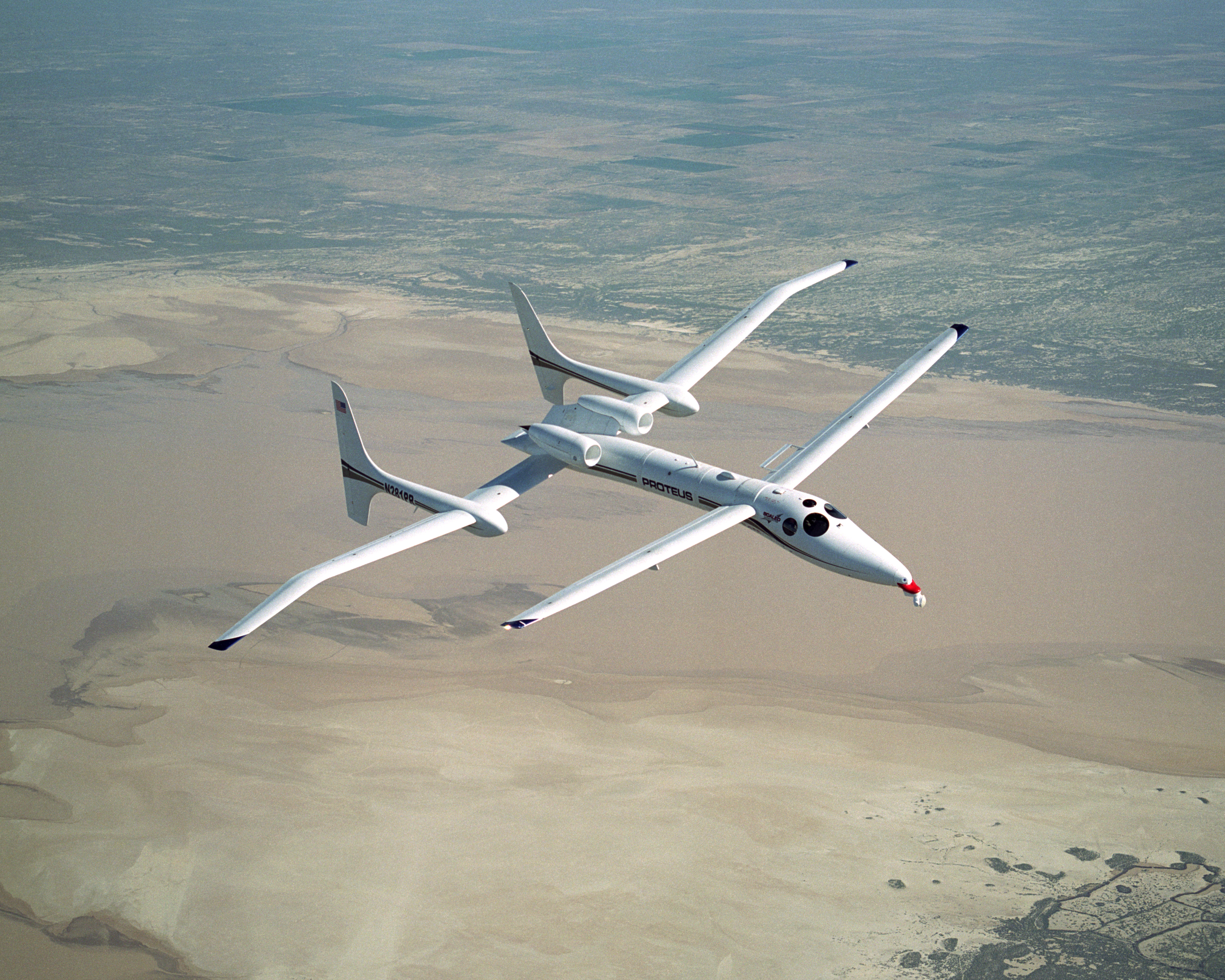
Scaled Composites Proteus (1998)

The next breakthrough to manufacture came once again in the homebuilt market. Up-and-coming maverick designer Burt Rutan was working on a low-powered but highly efficient plane for home construction. The tandem layout offered a low-drag fixed undercarriage installation, by placing the main wheels in housings at the tips of the fore wing and applying anhedral to raise the fuselage high enough for a propeller. The high-mounted rear wing had compensating dihedral. The Quickie first flew in 1977 and the next year won the EAA's Outstanding New Design Award at Oshkosh. It became popular, and several variants subsequently appeared.

Rutan set up Scaled Composites and some of the company's later designs were also tandems.

== List of tandem-wing aircraft ==
This list is incomplete. Please help by expanding it

Type	Country	Class	Role	Date	Status	No.	Notes
Airbus A³ Vahana	US	Propeller	Private	2018	Prototype	2	Tiltwing personal air vehicle.
Arsenal-Delanne 10	France	Propeller	Fighter	1940	Prototype	1	
Blériot III/IV	France	Propeller	Experimental	1906	Project	1	Failed to fly as either the III or IV.
Blériot VI	France	Propeller	Experimental	1907	Prototype	1	
Caproni Ca.60	Italy	Propeller	Transport	1921	Prototype	1	Nine-wing triple-tandem triplane.
Croses Pouplume	France	Propeller		1960	Home build	55+	Ultralight
Curtiss-Wright X-19	US	Propeller	Experimental	1963	Prototype	2	Four-engined tiltrotor convertiplane
Delanne 20-T	France	Propeller	Experimental	1938	Prototype	2	Test plane for the Arsenal-Delanne 10 fighter.
Moscow Aviation Institute Sh-Tandem	USSR	Prototype	Attack	1937	Prototype	1	Also known as the Grushin Sh-Tandem. MAI-3.
Langley Aerodrome	US	Propeller	Experimental	1902	Project	1	Failed to take off.
Ligeti Stratos	Australia	Propeller	Private	1985	Prototype	2	Joined wing. (Cited in main text)
Lockspeiser LDA-01	UK	Propeller	Utility	1971	Prototype	1	
Mauboussin Hémiptère	France	Propeller	Experimental	1936	Prototype	1	
Mignet Pou-du-Ciel	France	Propeller	Private	1933	Homebuilt		
Miles M.35 Libellula	UK	Propeller	Experimental	1942	Prototype	1	proof of concept for carrier fighter
Miles M.39B Libellula	UK	Propeller	Experimental	1943	Prototype	1	scale prototype for tandem wing jet bomber
Montgomery Aeroplane The Santa Clara	US	Glider	Experimental	1905	Prototype	1	
Payen PA-22	France	Propeller	Experimental	1942	Prototype	1	Delta rear wing. Begun prewar.
Peyret Tandem	France	Glider	Private	1922	Prototype	1	Won the 1922 British Glider Competition.
Peyret VI	France	Propeller	Experimental	1933	Prototype	1	Forerunner of the SFCA Taupin.
Piel CP-10 Pinocchio	France	Propeller	Private	1948	Prototype	1	Similar to the Mignet Pou du Ciel.
QAC Quickie Q2 series	US	Propeller	Private	1980	Homebuilt	2000+	Derivatives of the Rutan Quickie.
Rutan Quickie	US	Propeller	Private	1978	Homebuilt	350+	
Salmon Tandem Monoplane	UK	Propeller	Private	1923	Prototype	1	
Scaled Composites ATTT	US	Propeller	Experimental	1986	Prototype	1	
Scaled Composites Proteus	US	Jet	Experimental	1998	Prototype	1	High-altitude endurance.
SFCA Taupin	France	Propeller	Private	1936	Production	53	
SFCA Lignel 44	France	Propeller	Private	1946	Prototype	1	4-seat development of the Taupin.
Viking Dragonfly	US	Propeller	Private	1980	Homebuilt	500+	
Westland P.12 Lysander Delanne	UK	Propeller	Utility	1940	Prototype	1	Modified Lysander to include rear wing and gun turret.

== Tandem wings in nature ==
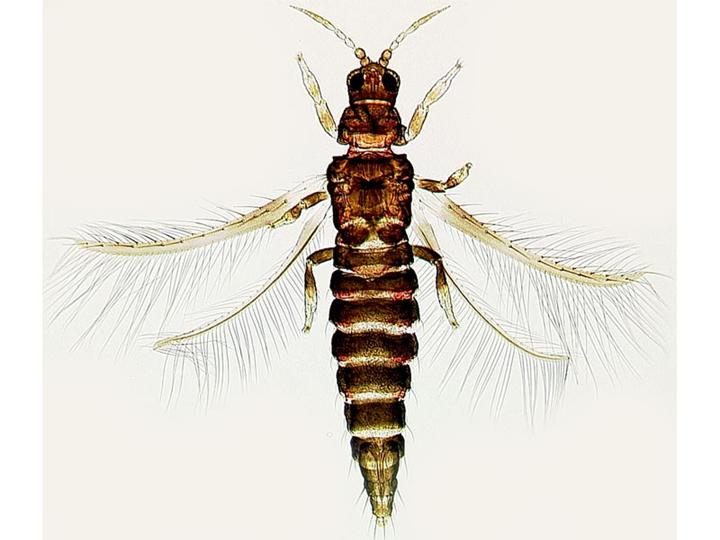
Echinothrips americanus is only about 1 mm long.

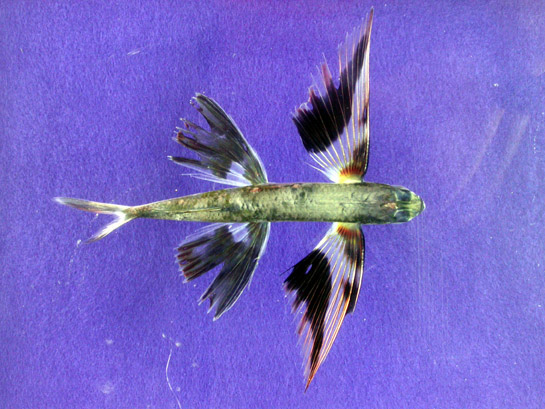
The band-wing flying fish has enlarged pectoral and pelvic fins.

=== Insects ===
Several orders of flying insects employ tandem wings, each with its characteristic anatomy and flight modes.

Insects with tandem flapping wings include the Odonata (dragonflies and damselflies), Lepidoptera (butterflies and moths) and some Thysanoptera or Thrips. Odonata species typically have long, thin wings and can synchronise the flapping of fore and aft pairs in various different modes, allowing them to be both fast and highly manoeuvrable. By comparison the Lepidoptera have wider wings which are flapped in synchrony and may even overlap in flight, and are better suited to endurance flying. Thrips are smaller insects and the flying species have relatively stiff wings. Due to their small size, they generate lift via clap and fling flapping rather than the usual leading-edge vortex generation of most insects.

Many flying beetles, such as the ladybird, have forward wing cases which open out in flight but do not flap significantly. While on the ground they protect the delicate main, hind wings, while in the air they may be used to modify the aerodynamics of the flapping main wing.

=== Flying fish ===
Flying fish have enlarged pectoral fins and are capable of gliding flight, though not of true flapping flight. Some species, such as the band-wing, also have sufficiently enlarged pelvic fins, further back along their bodies, to form a tandem layout.

=== Dinosaurs ===
Microraptor was a genus of tandem-winged dinosaurs, possibly only a single species. It is known only from the fossil record, principally in China. Both fore and hind limbs were covered in flight feathers and it is thought to have been capable of true flapping flight as well as gliding. Its flight mode is not known.

== See also ==
- Stagger (aeronautics)
