= Lockspeiser LDA-01 =

LDA-01
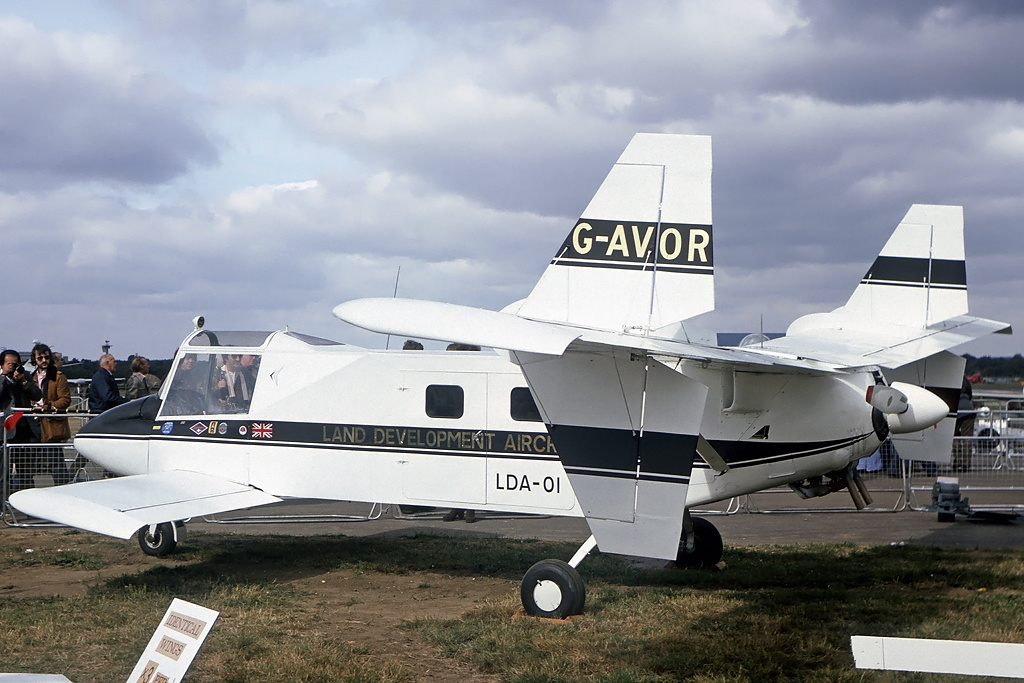

General information
- Type: Experimental utility transport
- National origin: United Kingdom
- Manufacturer: Lockspeiser
- Designer: David Lockspeiser
- Status: Destroyed
- Number built: 1

History
- First flight: 24 August 1971

The Lockspeiser LDA-01 ("Land Development Aircraft") was a British seven-tenths scale research and development tandem wing aircraft, which was designed and built by test pilot and engineer David Lockspeiser to prove a concept for a low-cost utility transport.

== Design and development ==
The LDA-01 was a single-seat tandem-wing monoplane, fabric covered with metal construction. The foreplane had a common design to the separately made port and starboard wings of the main plane, giving it half the area. The intention was to reduce the number of spare parts needed by re-using the same wing component interchangeably in each location. The main wings were mounted at the rear-end of the box structure fuselage and the fore wing was attached underneath the front. The fuselage was fitted initially with a four-wheeled landing gear and was designed to be fitted with a detachable payload container to allow easy conversion between roles. The landing gear was changed later in development to a more conventional tricycle configuration. It was powered by a rear-mounted pusher engine. The LDA-01 G-AVOR first flew on 24 August 1971 at Wisley in Surrey, under the power of an 85 hp (63 kW) Continental C85 piston engine, but was later refitted with a more powerful Lycoming O-320 engine.

The aircraft (which by this time had been re-registered G-UTIL), and had been renamed the Boxer 500, was being modified to planned production configuration by Brooklands Aerospace at Old Sarum Airfield when it was destroyed in a fire on 16 January 1987.

== Specifications (LDA-01) ==
Data from , British Civil Aircraft since 1919, Jane's All The World's Aircraft 1976–77.

General characteristics

- Crew: 1
- Length: 22 ft 6 in (6.86 m)
- Wingspan: 13 ft 0 in (3.96 m) foreplane
- Rearplane span: * 13 ft (4.0 m)
- Height: 10 ft 3 in (3.12 m)
- Wing area: 108.8 sq ft (10.11 m^{2})
- Aspect ratio: Rear wing:7; Forward wing:4.5
- Airfoil: NACA 23012
- Empty weight: 1,237 lb (561 kg)
- Gross weight: 1,616 lb (733 kg)
- Max takeoff weight: 1,700 lb (771 kg)
- Fuel capacity: 138 L (36 US gal; 30 imp gal) in two fuel tanks fore and aft of the cargo bay
- Powerplant: 1 × Lycoming O-320-D1A 4-cyl. air-cooled horizontally-opposed piston engine, 160 hp (120 kW)
- Propellers: Hoffmann HO-V72
- Propellers: 5 ft 9 in (1.76 m) diameter constant-speed metal pusher propeller

Performance

- Cruise speed: 92 kn (110 mph, 170 km/h)
- Stall speed: 42 kn (48 mph, 78 km/h)
- Range: 140 nmi (160 mi, 260 km)
