= Arsenal-Delanne 10 =

French experimental fighter aeroplane

General information
- Type: Fighter
- Manufacturer: Arsenal de l'Aéronautique
- Designer: Maurice Delanne
- Number built: 1

History
- Introduction date: 1940– 41
- First flight: October 1941

The Arsenal-Delanne 10 was an experimental fighter aircraft of French origin. The plane had a rear cockpit and a distinctive tandem wing.

== Design and development ==
The Arsenal-Delanne 10-C2 two-seat fighter, designed by Maurice Delanne and built by the Arsenal de l'Aéronautique, was of so-called Nenadovich biplane or tandem wing configuration, the tandem-mounted wings providing a continuous slot effect and offering exceptional center of gravity range. The fighter was of all metal stressed-skin construction, which used a sandwich technique, with a smooth dural skin welded to a corrugated sheet. Pilot and gunner sat in tandem under a single canopy at the rear of the fuselage, which was level with the rear wing, which carried twin tailplanes. This arrangement gave the gunner a clear field of fire for his planned armament of two 7.5 mm machine guns, which was to be supplemented by a 20 mm cannon firing through the propeller hub and two more machine guns in the wing. The aircraft was fitted with a retractable tailwheel undercarriage and was powered by a single 860 hp (641 kW) Hispano-Suiza 12Ycrs 12-cylinder liquid-cooled engine.

The Arsenal-Delanne 10-C2 prototype was virtually complete at Villacoublay when German forces occupied the factory in June 1940. Work on the aircraft continued in a desultory fashion and the first flight test was made in October 1941. After completion of the initial test programme, the aircraft was ferried to Germany for further trials.

== Specifications ==
Data from War Planes of the Second World War: Volume One Fighters

General characteristics

- Crew: 2
- Length: 7.328 m (24 ft 0.5 in)
- Wingspan: 10.11 m (33 ft 2 in)
- Height: 3.00 m (9 ft 10 in)
- Wing area: 22.50 m^{2} (242.2 sq ft)
- Powerplant: 1 × Hispano-Suiza 12Ycrs liquid-cooled v12 engine, 640 kW (860 hp)

Performance

- Maximum speed: 550 km/h (342 mph, 297 kn) at 5,415 m (14,764 ft)
- Endurance: 1.5 hr
- Service ceiling: 10,000 m (32,810 ft)
- Time to altitude: 6.5 min to 5,000 m (16,400 ft)

Armament

- Guns: (proposed)
  - 1 × fixed forward firing 20 mm cannon and 2 × wing mounted 7.5 mm MAC 1934 machine guns
  - 2 × flexibly mounted 7.5 mm machine guns in rear cockpit

== See also ==
- Miles M.35 Libellula

== Bibliography ==
- Cuny, Jean (January 1989). "Delanne: une certaine formule (2): le Delanne 10 C2" [Delanne: A Certain Formula, Part 2: The Delanne 10 C2]. Le Fana de l'Aviation (in French) (230): 14–20. ISSN 0757-4169.
- Cuny, Jean & Lebourg, J. (February 1989). "Delanne: une certaine formule (3): le Delanne 10 C2" [Delanne: A Certain Formula, Part 3: The Delanne 10 C2]. Le Fana de l'Aviation (in French) (231): 33–35. ISSN 0757-4169.
- Green, William (1967). War Planes of the Second World War: Fighters. Vol. I. London: Macdonald. ISBN 0-356-01445-2.
