= Mikoyan-Gurevich MiG-8 =

Experimental aircraft in the USSR

MiG-8 Utka
- The MiG-8 in flight

General information
- Type: Experimental liaison aircraft
- National origin: Soviet Union
- Manufacturer: Mikoyan-Gurevich
- Status: Prototype
- Number built: 1

History
- First flight: 13 August 1945

The Mikoyan-Gurevich MiG-8 Utka (Russian: Микоян и Гуревич МиГ-8 «Утка», "duck") was a Soviet experimental aircraft. Built of wood, the aircraft was designed and built in 1945 to test the novel canard configuration. It also used a tricycle undercarriage, the first used by the OKB. It was modified to test a variety of vertical stabilizer and wingtip configurations and was later used as a liaison aircraft for many years by the design bureau.

== Design and development ==
Nicknamed Utka ("duck"), as the word canard (referring to its small forward wing) is French for "duck", and with the Russian aeronautics term for a canard wing being described as a "duck" scheme (схема "утка"), the MiG-8 was an experimental aircraft designed and built by the OKB to evaluate the stability and handling of the canard configuration in conjunction with swept wings. This design has benefits in a jet-powered aircraft as it leaves the rear of the fuselage clear of interference from the jet's exhausts. To test the concept the MiG-8 was powered by a Shvetsov M-11 five-cylinder radial engine, with a pusher propeller.

== Operational history ==
The aircraft was used as a testbed for developing the swept wing of the MiG-15, and afterwards continued to fly as a communications/utility aircraft for the OKB. Being made of wood and fabric, it was very light and reportedly a favorite among MiG OKB test pilots for its docile, slow-speed handling characteristics.

== Specifications ==
Data from MiG aircraft since 1937, The Osprey Encyclopaedia of Russian Aircraft 1875–1995

General characteristics

- Crew: 1
- Capacity: 2
- Length: 6.995 m (22 ft 11 in)
- Wingspan: 9.5 m (31 ft 2 in)
- Wing area: 15 m^{2} (160 sq ft)
- Airfoil: Clark YH 12%
- Empty weight: 642 kg (1,415 lb)
- Gross weight: 1,150 kg (2,535 lb)
- Fuel capacity: 195 L (43 imp gal; 52 US gal)
- Powerplant: 1 × Shvetsov M-11FM 5-cylinder air-cooled radial piston engine, 82 kW (110 hp) (de-rated)
- Propellers: 2-bladed fixed-pitch pusher propeller

Performance

- Maximum speed: 205 km/h (127 mph, 111 kn)
- Landing speed: 77 km/h (48 mph; 42 kn)
- Range: 500 km (310 mi, 270 nmi)

== See also ==
Related lists

- List of experimental aircraft

== Bibliography ==
- Gordon, Yefim and Komissarov, Dmitry. OKB Mikoyan: A History of the Design Bureau and its Aircraft. Hinckley, England: Midland Publishing, 2009 ISBN 978-1-85780-307-5
- Gunston, Bill. The Osprey Encyclopaedia of Russian Aircraft 1875–1995. London: Osprey, 1995 ISBN 1-85532-405-9
