= Aviation in the pioneer era =

Aviation history, 1903 to 1914

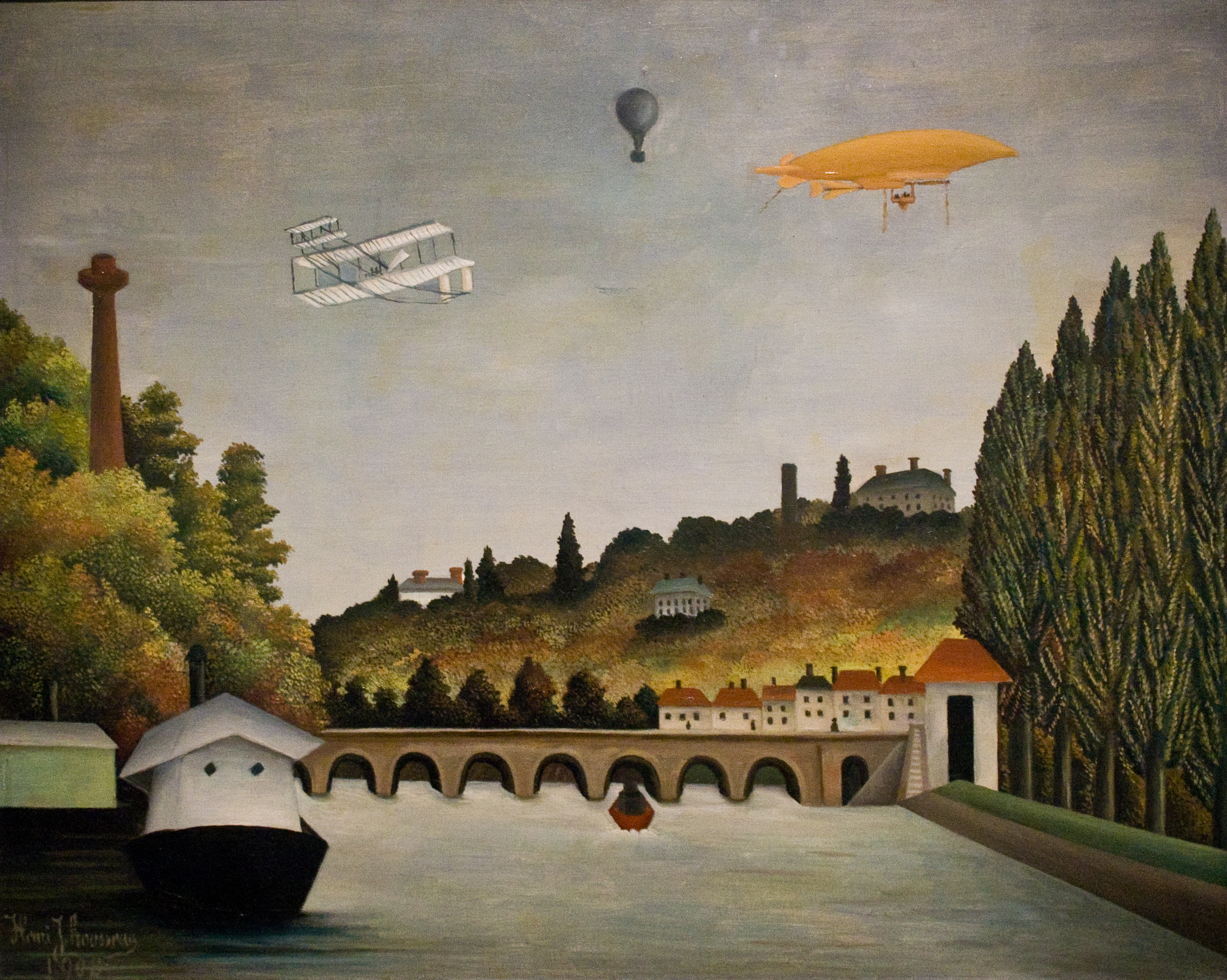
Vue du Pont de Sèvres, painted in 1908 by Henri Rousseau

The pioneer era of aviation was the period of aviation history between the first successful powered flight, generally accepted to have been made by the Wright Brothers on 17 December 1903, and the outbreak of the First World War in August 1914.

Once the principles of powered controlled flight had been established there was a period in which many different aircraft configurations were experimented with. By 1914 the tractor configuration biplane had become the most popular form of aircraft design, and would remain so until the end of the 1920s. The development of the internal combustion engine—primarily from their use in early automobiles even before the start of the 20th century—which enabled successful heavier-than-air flight also produced rapid advances in lighter-than-air flight, particularly in Germany where the Zeppelin company rapidly became the world leader in the field of airship construction.

During this period aviation passed from being seen as the preserve of eccentric enthusiasts to being an established technology, with the establishment of specialist aeronautical engineering research organizations and university courses and the creation of major industrial aircraft manufacturing businesses, and aviation became a subject of enormous popular interest. Flying displays such as the Grande Semaine d'Aviation of 1909 and air races such as the Gordon Bennett Trophy and the Circuit of Europe attracted huge audiences and successful pilots such as Jules Védrines and Claude Grahame-White became celebrities.

== An emerging technology ==
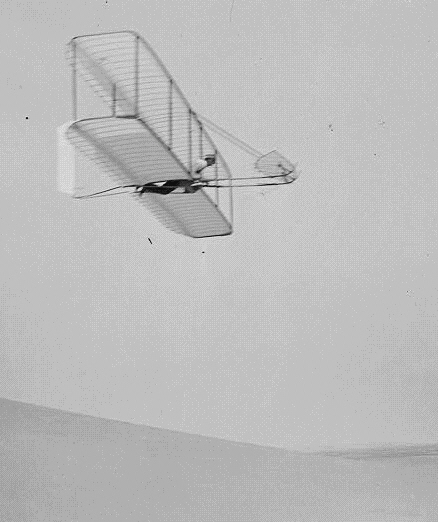
Wilbur Wright gliding, October 1902

Although the Wright brothers made their first successful powered flights in December 1903 and by 1905 were making flights of significant duration, their achievement was largely unknown to the world in general and was widely disbelieved. After their flights in 1905 the Wrights stopped work on developing their aircraft and concentrated on trying to commercially exploit their invention, attempting to interest the military authorities of the United States and then, after being rebuffed, France and Great Britain. Consequently, attempts to achieve powered flight continued, principally in France. To publicize the aeronautical concourse at the upcoming World's Fair in St. Louis, Octave Chanute gave a number of lectures at aero-clubs in Europe, sharing his excitement about flying gliders. He showed slides of his own glider flying experiments as well as some of the Wrights glider flying in 1901 and 1902. All these talks were reproduced in club journals. The lecture to members of the Aéro-Club de France in April 1903 is the best known, and the August 1903 issue of l'Aérophile carried an article by Chanute that included drawings of his gliders as well as the Wright glider and a description of their approach to the problem, saying "the time is evidently approaching when, the problem of equilibrium and control having been solved, it will be safe to apply a motor and a propeller". Chanute's lecture moved Ernest Archdeacon, one of the founder members of the Aéro-Club, to conclude his account of the lectures:

Will the homeland of Montgolfier have the shame of allowing this ultimate discovery of aerial science—which is certainly imminent... to be realised abroad? Gentleman scholars, to your compasses! You, the Maecenases; and you, too, of the Government; put your hands in your pockets—or else we are beaten!

In October 1904 the Aéro-Club de France announced a series of prizes for achievements in powered flight, but little practical work was done: Ferdinand Ferber, an army officer who in 1898 had experimented with a hang-glider based on that of Otto Lilienthal continued his work without any notable success, Archdeacon commissioned the construction of a glider based on the Wright design but smaller and lacking the provision for roll control which made a number of brief flights at Berck-sur-Mer in April 1904, piloted by Ferber and Gabriel Voisin (the longest of around 29 m (95 ft), compared to the 190 m (620 ft) achieved by the Wrights in 1902): another glider based on the Wright design was constructed by Robert Esnault-Pelterie, who rejected wing-warping as unsafe and instead fitted a pair of mid-gap control surfaces in front of the wings, intended to be used in a differential manner in place of wing-warping and in conjunction to act as elevators (as what are known today as elevons): this is the first recorded use of ailerons, the concept for which had been patented over a generation earlier by M. P. W. Boulton of the United Kingdom in 1868. This was not successful and Esnault-Pelterie was later to use its failure to support the position that the Wright Brothers claims were unfounded. However, his design was not an exact copy of the Wrights' glider, particularly in having a greatly increased wing camber. Ferber's copy was likewise unsuccessful: it was crudely constructed, without ribs to maintain the wing camber, but is notable for his later addition of a fixed rear-mounted stabilising tail surface, the first instance of this feature in a full-size aircraft. Archdeacon abandoned the 1904 glider after the first attempts and commissioned a second glider, which was constructed by Gabriel Voisin in 1905; this broke up in mid air when towed into the air behind a car, fortunately carrying sandbags in place of a pilot. Voisin then constructed another glider, mounted on floats and introducing the box kite-like stabilising tail which was to be a characteristic of his later aircraft: this was successfully towed into the air behind a motor-boat on 8 June 1905, and Voisin's glider and a second similar aircraft built for Louis Blériot were tested on 18 July, the flight of Blériots aircraft ending in a crash in which Voisin, the pilot, was nearly drowned. Voisin and Blériot then constructed a powered tandem wing biplane, which was subjected to a number of modifications without any success.

=== First powered flights outside of the United States ===
Full details of the Wright Brothers' flight control system was published in l'Aérophile in the January 1906 issue, making clear both the mechanism and its aerodynamic reason. Nevertheless, the crucial importance of lateral control in making controlled turns was not appreciated, and the French experimenters instead aimed to construct inherently stable aircraft.

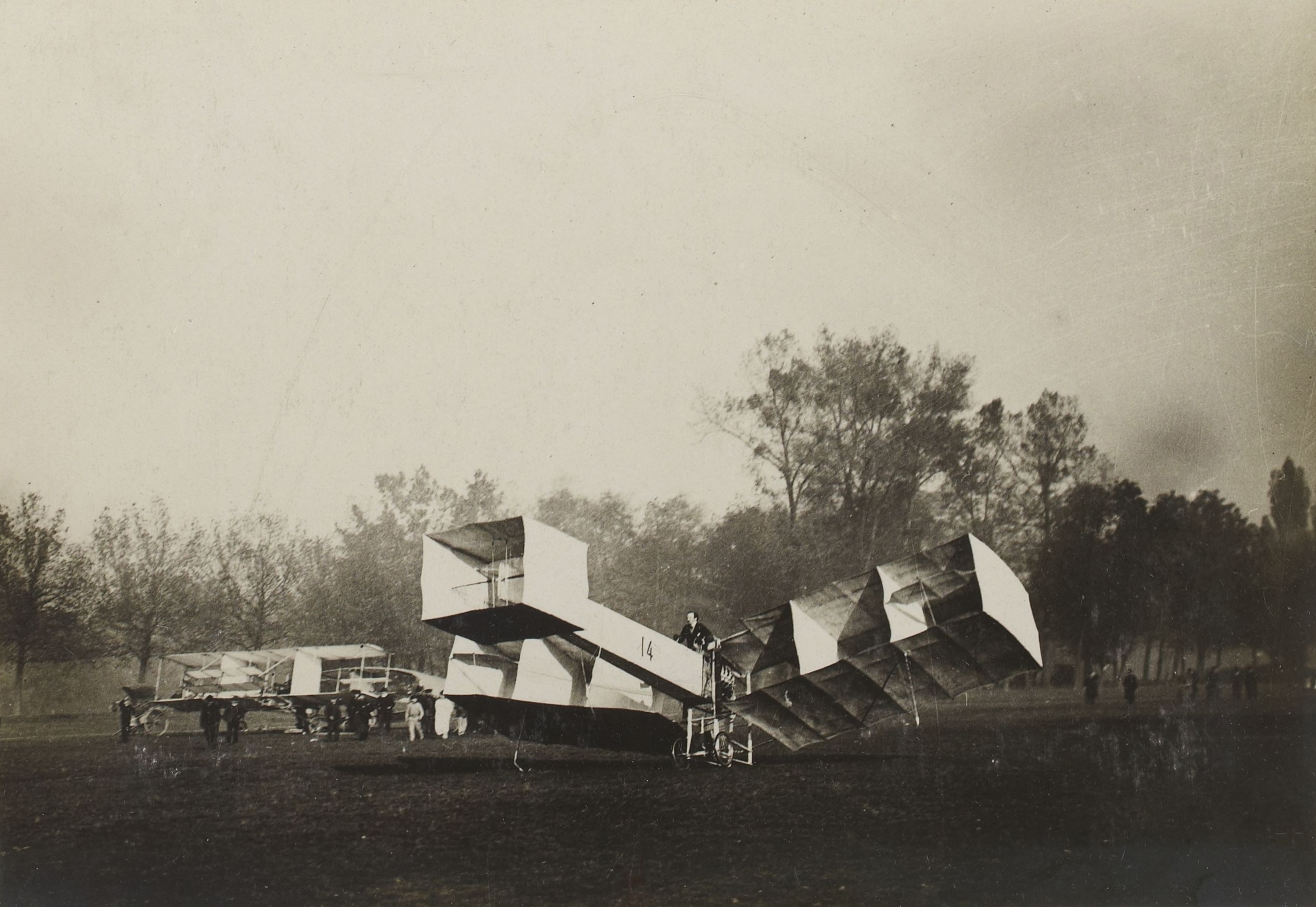
Photo of Santos-Dumont's 12 November 1906 aileron-fitted Quatorze-Bis, for its concluding series of flights before retirement.

In the late summer and autumn of 1906 Alberto Santos Dumont made the first successful powered heavier-than-air flights in Europe in his 14-bis, culminating in a flight of 220 m (720 ft) on the grounds of the Parisian Chateau de Bagatelle on 12 November, winning an Aéro-Club de France prize for a flight of over 100 m. Initially relying on pronounced dihedral to provide stability, by the November flight, octagonal-planform interplane ailerons - as a possible "first-use" (if not the first) of Boulton's 1868 patent on an engine-powered airframe - somewhat like Esnault-Pelterie's design for his own glider; had been fitted to Santos-Dumont's aircraft for its own concluding flights, before its own imminent retirement.

Earlier that year Gabriel Voisin had established an aircraft construction company at Boulogne-Billancourt: his first successful aircraft, which lacked any provision for roll control, was the Delagrange No.1 biplane, named after its owner Leon Delagrange. This was first flown by Voisin on 30 March 1907. and in February 1908 a second example flown by Henri Farman won the Archdeacon-de la Meurthe Grand Prix d'Aviation for the first officially observed closed-circuit flight of over a kilometer. Among the most persistent French experimenters was Louis Blériot, who after a brief partnership with Gabriel Voisin, had established Recherches Aéronautiques Louis Blériot and produced a series of monoplane designs. On 16 November 1907 he successfully flew his Blériot VII, a monoplane with tail surfaces moved differentially for roll control and in unison for pitch control. This aircraft, which is recognised as the first successful monoplane, was soon wrecked in a crash, but was quickly followed by his eighth design, the first aircraft ever to essentially have the original form of flight control setup used to this day.

In North America, the Canadian-American Aerial Experiment Association was founded by Alexander Graham Bell, who had made a number of earlier experiments with tetrahedral kites, and John McCurdy and his friend Frederick Walker Baldwin, two recent engineering graduates of the University of Toronto, on 30 September 1907. The AEA produced a number of fundamentally similar biplane designs, greatly influenced by the Wright's work, and these were flown with increasing success during 1908. Baldwin flew their first design, Red Wing on 12 March 1908, flying 97 m (318 ft) before crashing and being damaged beyond repair: its successor, White Wing, equipped with ailerons, made three flights in May, the best of 310 m (1,020 ft), before being destroyed in a crash. On 4 July 1908 their next aircraft, the June Bug piloted by Glenn Curtiss, won the Scientific American trophy for the first officially observed one kilometer flight in North America. After the AEA's disbandment at the end of March 1909, one of its American members went on to start a growing US-based aviation firm.

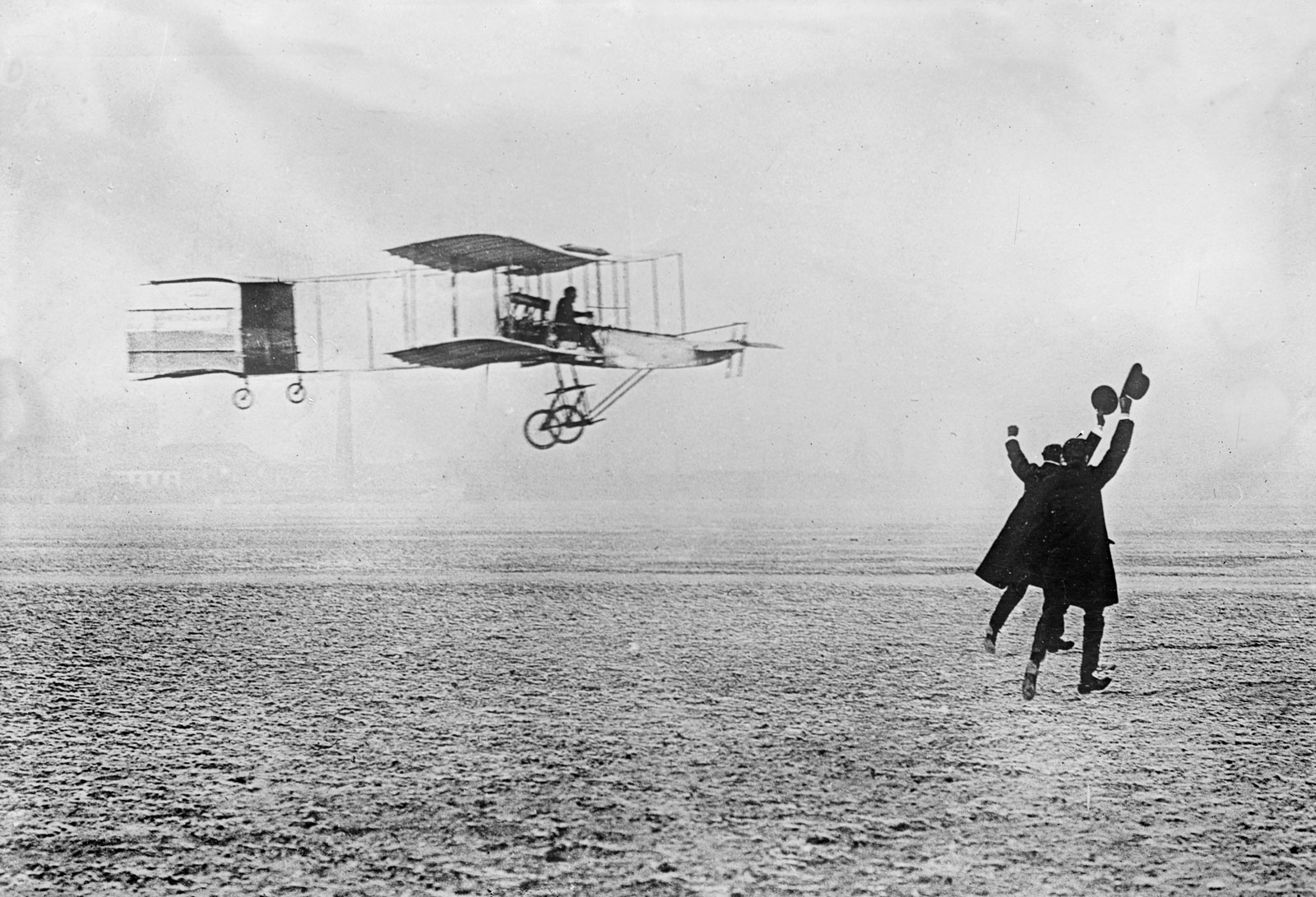
Henri Farman winning the Grand Prix d'Aviation, 13 January 1908

In 1908 Wilbur Wright finally visited Europe and in August made a series of flight demonstrations which convincingly demonstrated the superiority of their aircraft, particularly its ability to make controlled banked turns, to the European aviation community. The first flight only lasted 1 minute 45 seconds, in which two circles were flown, but the effect was profound, Louis Blériot saying "I consider that for us in France, and everywhere, a new era in mechanical flight has commenced. I am not sufficiently calm after the event to thoroughly express my opinion. My view can be best conveyed in the words, 'It is marvellous!' " Leon Delagrange simply said "We are beaten". Following these demonstrations, Henri Farman fitted his Voisin biplane with ailerons in order to achieve the full controllability demonstrated by Wilbur Wright: following a falling-out with Gabriel Voisin he then started his own aircraft manufacturing business. His first design, the Farman III (the Farman I and II were Voisin designs that he owned) was one of the most successful aircraft designs of the pioneer era, and was widely copied by other manufacturers, including one soon-to-be-prominent British firm.

== Flight as an established technology ==
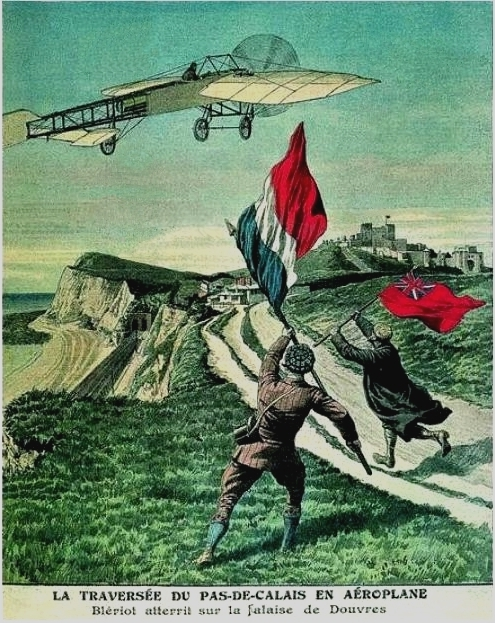
Contemporary illustration of Louis Blériot landing at Dover in a Blériot XI

1909 can be regarded as the year in which aviation came of age. At the end of 1908 the first exhibition devoted to aircraft was held in the Grand Palais in Paris, and this was followed by the first London Aero Exhibition at Olympia in May 1909. The Aéro-Club de France issued its first pilot's licences in January, awarding them to a select few pioneer aviators including the Wright Brothers. The first British magazine to be devoted to the subject, Flight published its first issue in January. (Aviation matters had previously been covered by The Automotor Journal.) The British Daily Mail newspaper had offered a number of prizes with the intention of encouraging aviation: in 1906 it had offered a prize of £10,000 for the first flight between London and Manchester. This was met by widespread derision; the satirical magazine Punch responded by offering a similar prize for a flight to Mars. On July 25, 1909 Louis Blériot won their £1,000 prize for the first flight across the English Channel. One contemporary newspaper led its account of the event with the headline "Britain is no longer an island", and the flight caused a reassessment of Britain's strategic reliance on the Navy for defence. Blériot became world-famous, and the publicity resulted in over a hundred orders for copies of his design within a few weeks.

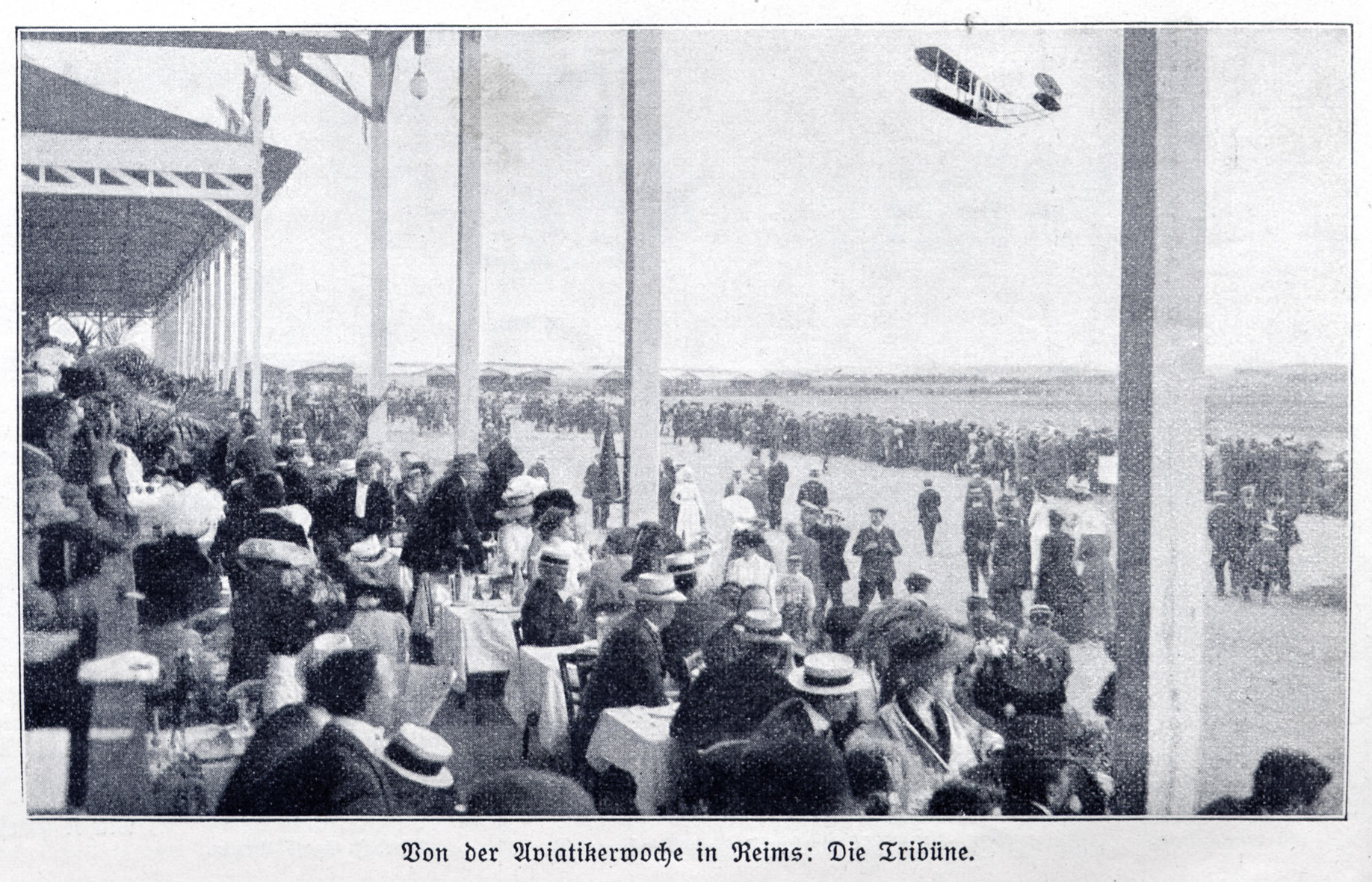
A Wright Biplane flies in front of the grandstand at the Grande Semaine d'Aviation held in Reims in 1909

The year also saw the Grande Semaine d'Aviation de la Champagne at Rheims, attended by half a million people, including Armand Fallières, the President of France; the King of Belgium and senior British political figures including David Lloyd George, who afterwards commented "Flying machines are no longer toys and dreams; they are an established fact" A second aircraft exhibition held in October at the Grand Palais in Paris attracted 100,000 visitors. In America, Wilbur Wright made two spectacular flights over New York Harbor, flying from Governor's Island. On 29 September he made a short flight circling the Statue of Liberty, and on 4 October he made a 34 km (21 miles) 33-minute flight over the Hudson witnessed by around a million New Yorkers.

== Lighter-than-air ==
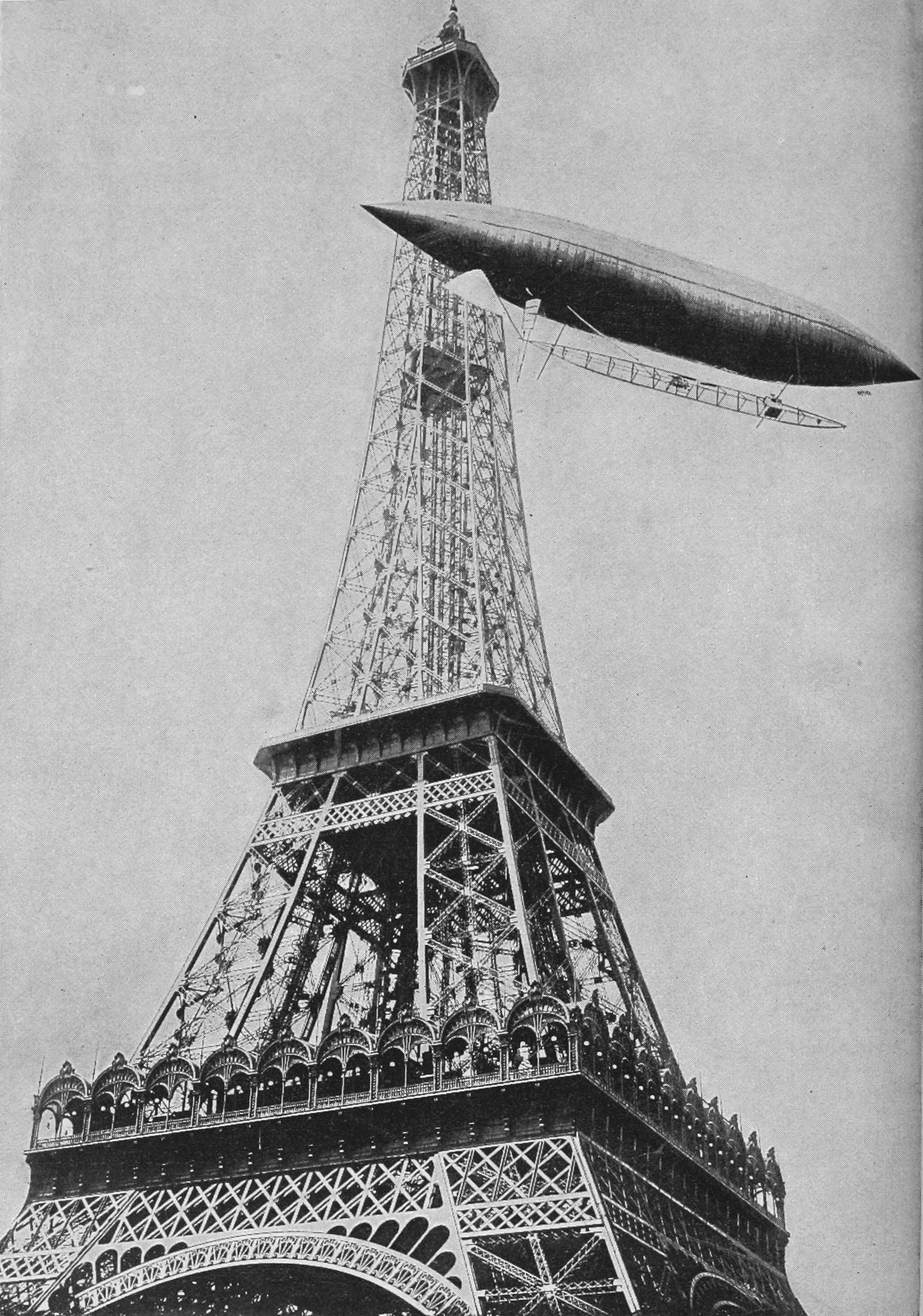
Santos Dumont rounding the Eiffel Tower. Although often published as being his prize-winning flight, this is in fact an earlier attempt

The lightweight power source provided by the petrol engine also revolutionised the prospects for airship development. Alberto Santos Dumont achieved celebrity status on 19 October 1901 by winning a prize for making a flight from Parc Saint Cloud to the Eiffel Tower and back. In Germany Graf (Count) Ferdinand von Zeppelin pioneered the construction of large rigid airships: his first design of 1900–01 had only limited success and his second was not constructed until 1906, but his efforts became an enormous source of patriotic pride for the German people: so much so that when his fourth airship LZ 4 was wrecked in a storm a public collection raised more than six million marks to enable him to carry on his work. Using Zeppelins, the world's first airline, DELAG, was established in Germany in 1910, operating pleasure cruises rather than a scheduled transport service: by the outbreak of war in 1914, 1588 flights had been made, carrying 10,197 fare-paying passengers. The military threat posed by these large airships, greatly superior in carrying power and endurance to heavier-than air machines of the time, caused considerable concern in other countries, especially Britain. Germany was alone in constructing rigid airships, and airship development elsewhere concentrated on non-rigid and semi-rigid designs. The only British attempt to construct a large rigid airship, HMA No. 1, broke its back before making a single flight and was abandoned, and the single French-built rigid was not much more successful.

== Start of an industry ==
Pre-1910, most aircraft builders were aviation enthusiasts, many from wealthy families. Blériot had financed his experiments out of the profits of his successful business manufacturing car headlights. In Great Britain Frederick Handley Page established an aircraft business in 1909 but was largely reliant on selling components such as connecting sockets and wire-strainers to other enthusiasts, while the Short Brothers, who had started in business manufacturing balloons, had transferred their interests to heavier-than air aviation and started licence production of the Wright design as well as working on their own designs. 1910 saw the involvement of people who saw aviation purely as a business opportunity. In January 1910 Sir George White, the chairman of Bristol Tramways, established the Bristol and Colonial Aeroplane Company, investing £25,000 in the business. The same year the silk broker Armand Deperdussin established the Société de Production des Aéroplanes Deperdussin, bearing the soon-to-be-famous SPAD acronym. In 1911 the armaments giant Vickers established an aircraft department. However, most aircraft manufacturing during the period was on a small scale, and very few designs were produced in any quantity.

== Technical development ==
A good indication of the progress during the era is provided by the annual Gordon Bennett races. The first competition, held in 1909 during the Grande Semaine d'Aviation at Reims, was over a distance of 20 km (12 mi) and was won by Glenn Curtiss at a speed of 75.27 km/h (46.77 mph). By 1913, the last pre-war contest, the race was over a distance of 200 km (120 mi) and the winner's speed was 200.8 km/h (124.8 mph). At the end of 1909 the record for distance flown was 234.30 km (145.59 mi) and for altitude 453 m (1,486 ft): by the end of 1913 the record for distance was 1,021.19 km (634.54 mi) and the altitude record was 6,120 m (20,079 ft)

=== Construction ===
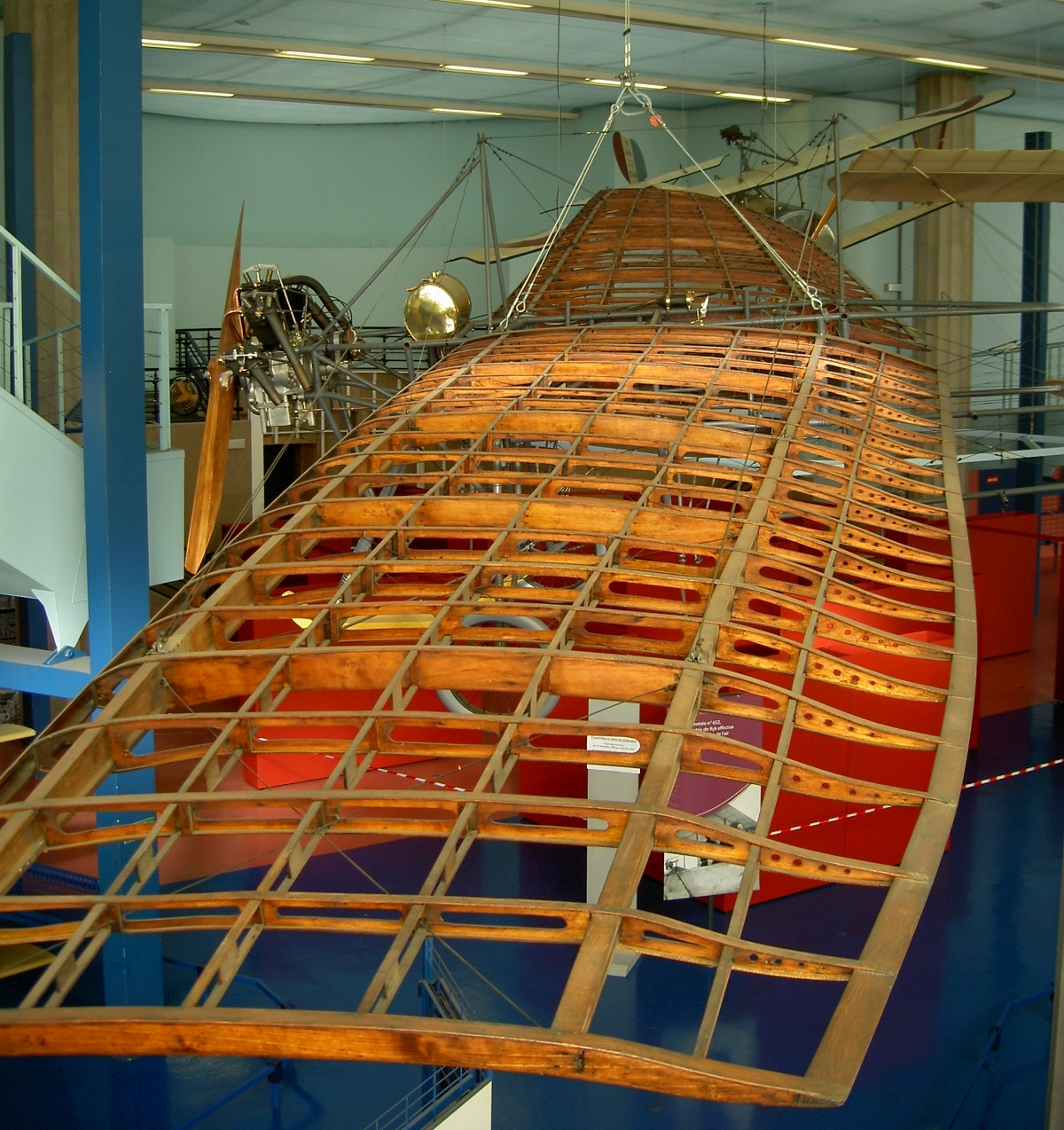
Vickers R.E.P. Type Monoplane preserved in the Musée de l'Air in France. Note the wire-braced steel tube fuselage.

Most pioneer era aircraft were constructed from wood, using metal sockets to joint members and making use of piano wire or stranded steel cable for bracing. Although aircraft of the era are often described as constructed of sticks and canvas their construction was of considerable sophistication. Wooden construction typically involved several different types of timber, with careful use of different woods according to their mechanical properties; ash and spruce were the most commonly used, although hickory, mahogany and poplar were among the other timbers employed. Struts were frequently hollow members formed by spindling out two pieces of wood and then glueing them together, usually using a tongue in groove joint to strengthen the joint. Wing spars were also often composite members, and the wing ribs were complex structures. When flying replicas of the 1910 Bristol Boxkite were made for the 1966 film Those Magnificent Men in their Flying Machines, a modern stress analysis was performed, and concluded that the airframe was close to conforming to modern requirements.

The use of metal for airframe construction was by no means uncommon: Robert Esnault-Pelterie used steel tubing to construct the fuselage of his aircraft as early as 1907, and Louis Breguet was another notable pioneer of metal construction, using steel channel sections for fuselage construction, steel tube for wing spars, pressed aluminium for wing ribs and aluminium sheeting for fuselage covering – this would not be improved upon until the second half of 1915.

The era also saw the first use of monocoque construction, first seen in Eugene Ruchonnet's Aero-Cigare and notably used in the Deperdussin Monocoque of 1912, which won the Gordon Bennett race in both 1912 and 1913. Another structurally advanced and influential (although unsuccessful) concept aircraft designs was the Antoinette Monobloc, which was the first monoplane design concept to have a cantilever wing without any external bracing wires.

Early aircraft were covered in a variety of fabrics including rubberised cotton and varnished silk. The development of aircraft dope in 1911 was a major technical development, and its use was quickly adopted by all manufacturers. This performed a number of functions, proofing the fabric against oil and petrol contamination, and also tightening the fabric.

=== Configuration ===
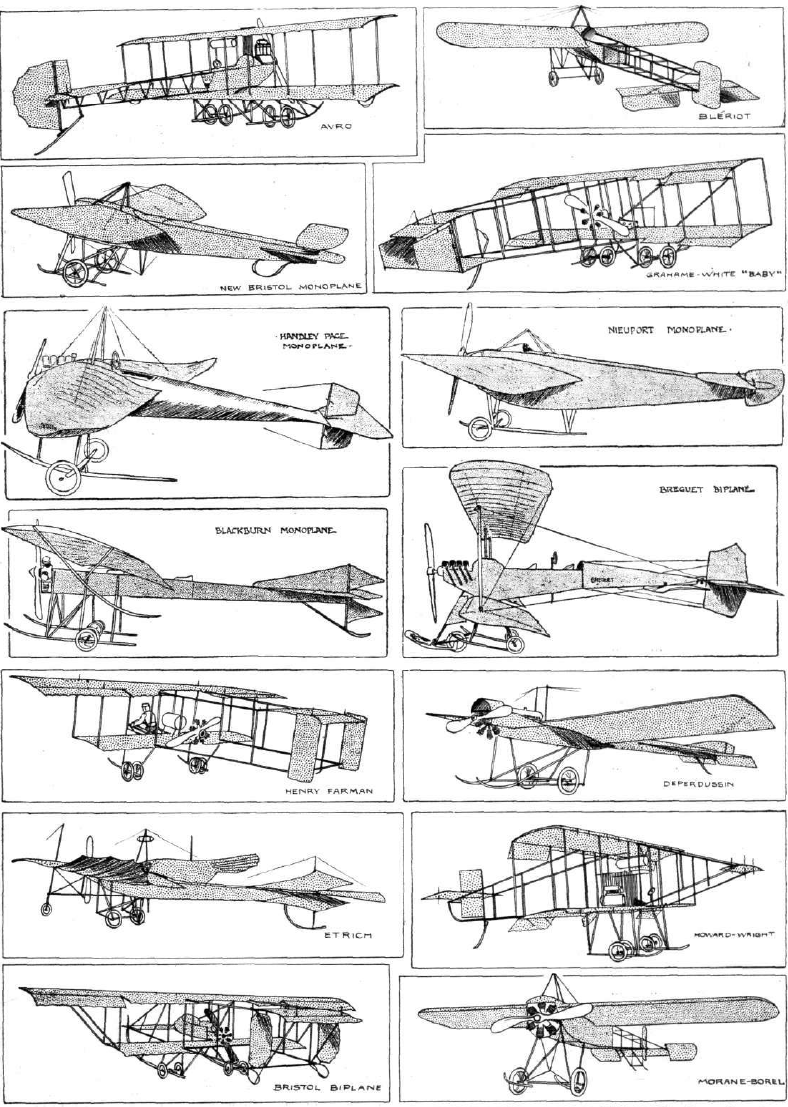
Typical aircraft of 1911: an illustration from Flight of competitors in the 1911 Daily Mail Circuit of Britain race

At the 1909 Grand Semaine d'Aviation the competing aircraft were of two different basic configurations: tractor configuration monoplanes such as the two types flown by Blériot and the Antoinette; and pusher configuration biplanes with a forward-mounted elevator, represented by the Voisin, licence-built copies of the Wright Brother's aircraft, Glenn Curtiss' No. 2 biplane and the Farman III. All the competing aircraft with the exception of the Voisin biplanes had roll control, using either ailerons or wing-warping The Wright design differed from the others in having no rear-mounted horizontal stabilising surface. Constructors of pusher biplanes almost universally adopted the use of a rear-mounted horizontal stabiliser and designs began to appear in which the front elevator was removed: the Wright Brothers adopted this configuration for their Model B of 1910. The tractor monoplane and the pusher biplane were the dominant configurations for the next couple of years, although designers experimented with various other configurations.

One of the most successful pusher biplanes was the Farman III, developed by Henri Farman following a falling-out with Gabriel Voisin: he retained the basic layout of the Voisin, but incorporated ailerons (as added to his Voisin), modified the undercarriage by adding skids to prevent the aircraft nosing-over on landing and modified the structure, eliminating the nacelle in which the pilot sat and mounting the forward elevator on outrigger booms. This design was copied by many constructors, and was so influential that when Mervyn O'Gorman created a scheme for classifying the products of the Royal Aircraft Factory according to their configuration such aircraft were classified as "F.E" for "Farman Experimental. All tractor aircraft were designated "B.E" for "Blériot Experimental", although all the B.E. designs produced were biplanes, unlike the designs for which Blériot was known.

The tractor biplane, which would become the dominant aircraft configuration until the 1930s, was a later development. The first aircraft of this type was the De Pischoff biplane which was built in 1907 but was not successful. The first aircraft of this type to fly was the Goupy No.2, flown in March 1909: the design was described by flight as "somewhat unusual", and Breguet described his Type III tractor biplane as a "double-surface monoplane". The configuration did not become widespread until 1911, with the production of the Avro 500 and the Royal Aircraft Factory BE.2. The Avro 500 was developed into the Avro 504, which continued in use until the 1930s. Avro also produced the first aircraft with fully enclosed crew accommodation, the Avro Type G of 1912. (The Blériot Aero-Taxi of 1911 had enclosed accommodation for the four passengers but an exposed pilot's position)

Other configurations were experimented with. The tail-first canard configuration used by the Wright brothers and also notably employed by Santos Dumont in the 14-bis was used by Henri Fabre for his Hydravion canard monoplane, the first successful seaplane in 1910. Other canard designs of the period include the Voisin Canard and the ASL Valkyrie monoplanes, and the configuration was thought promising enough to be used for the first aircraft designed by the Royal Aircraft Factory, the S.E.1, but the configuration was generally discarded. Examples of other configurations such as the annular wing and the tandem wing were also constructed, but with little success.

Early aircraft had a variety of control arrangements. The use of a joystick to control roll and pitch had been patented by Robert Esnault-Pelterie in 1907 and a similar arrangement was used by Blériot, but the Antoinette monoplanes were controlled by a pair of wheels, one on either side of the cockpit, one operating the wing-warping (or ailerons, as with the Antoinette IV) and the other the elevator and the Wright Model A had one lever to control wing-warping and rudder and a second to control the elevator. The first design to have the roll and pitch controls connected to a single joystick, with the yaw control operated with one's feet, was Blériot's Type VIII design of 1908–09, pioneering the basis for the modern aircraft flight control system still in use in the 21st century.

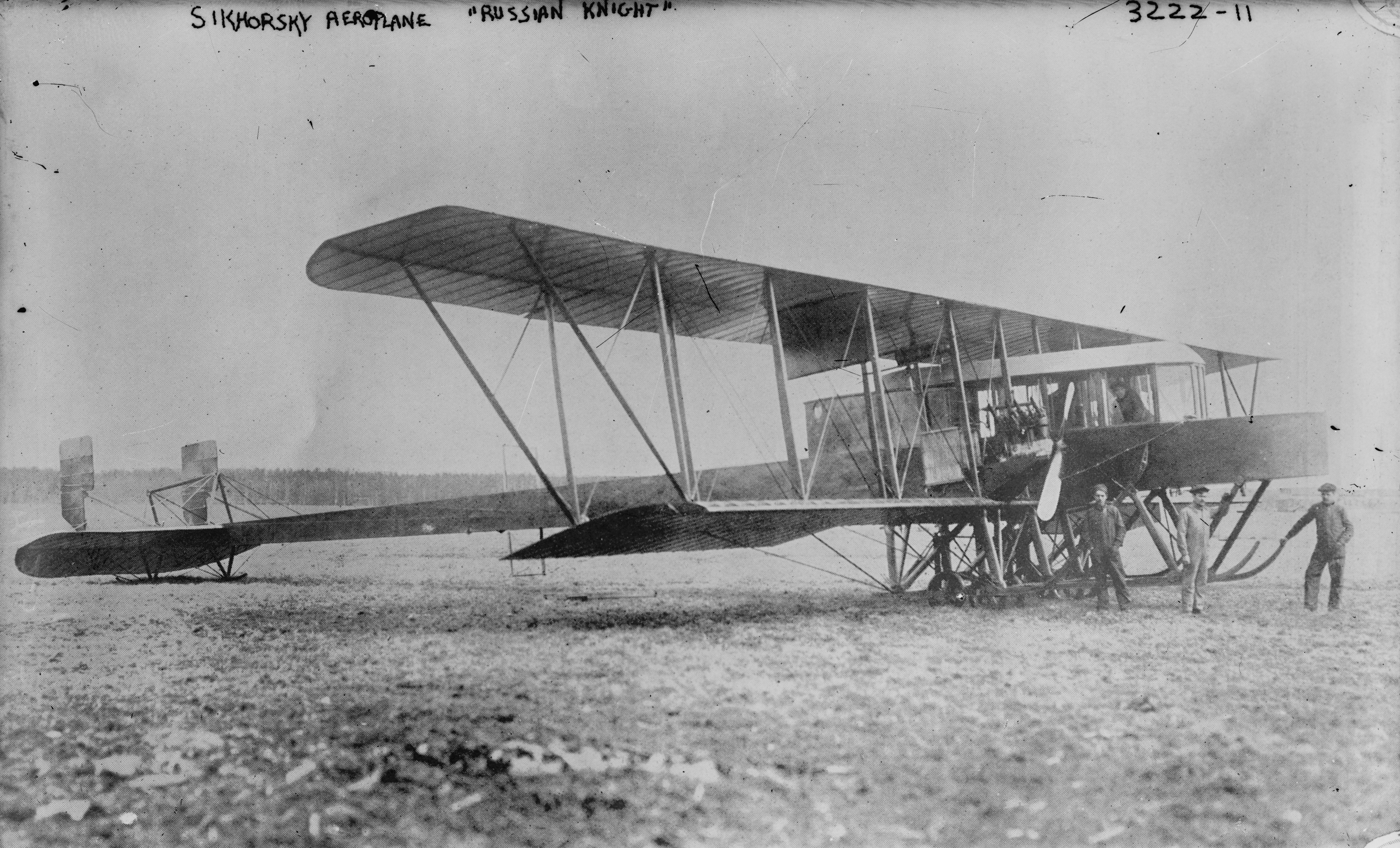
Sikorsky Bolshoi Baltisky of 1913

With very few exceptions aircraft of the pioneer era were relatively small designs powered by a single engine and designed to carry at most two or three people. Early multiple-engine designs were produced by the Short Brothers, who constructed a number of variants of their Farman-type Improved S.27 design. However, the intention of using a pair of engines in these aircraft was to safeguard against engine failure rather than to permit a larger machine, and even a large aircraft such as the Voisin Aero-Yacht, intended to carry six people and with a wingspan of 22.5 m (73 ft 10 in), was powered by a single engine. The first large multi-engined aircraft was Igor Sikorsky's Bolshoi Baltisky, first flown in May 1913 with two engines and later equipped with four.

=== Engine development ===
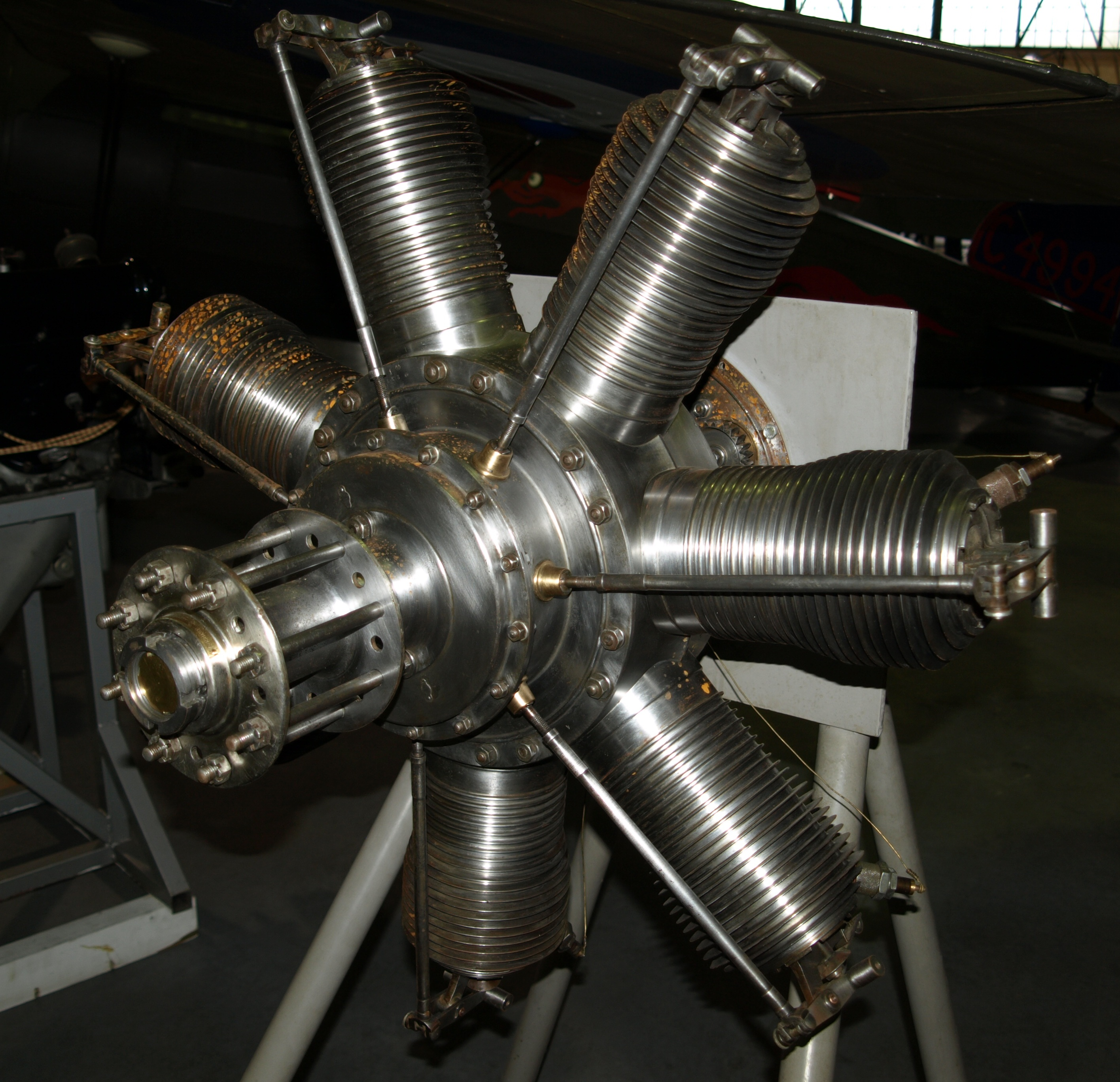
The Gnome Omega

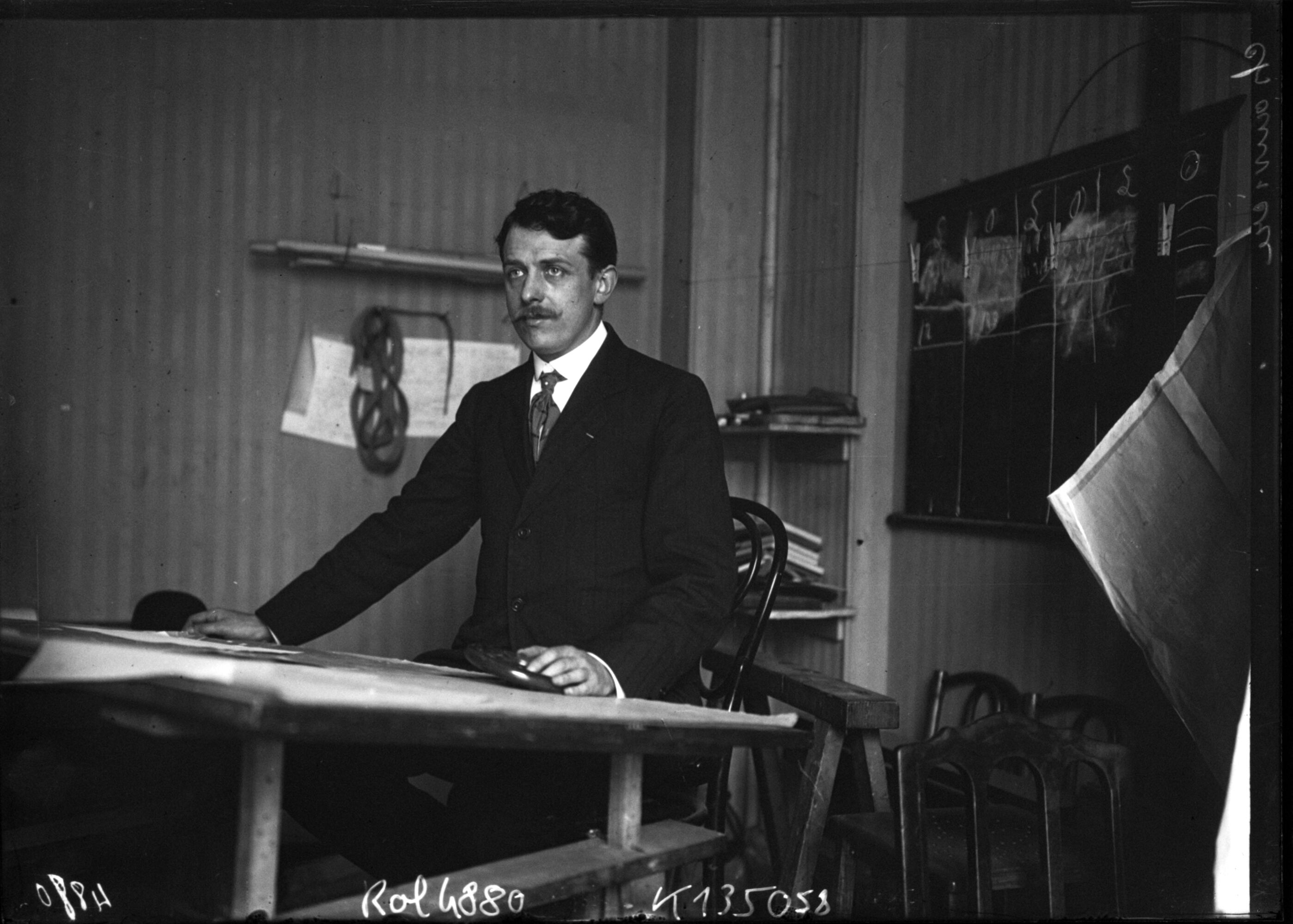
Lucien Chauvière, designer of the Integrale propeller for the Blériot XI's cross-Channel flight.

Early aircraft development was heavily reliant on the development of the internal combustion engine, and the problem of staying in the air was largely a matter of having an engine which was not only sufficiently powerful but was also lightweight and reliable. Most early engines were neither powerful nor reliable enough for practical use, and the development of improved engines went hand-in-hand with improvements in the airframes themselves.

The Wright Brothers had been unable to find a satisfactory engine and, with the help of their mechanic, had manufactured their own. They used a single flight engine, a 12 hp water-cooled four-cylinder inline type with five main bearings and fuel injection.

The first internal combustion piston engine design to be widely used for powering aircraft was the Antoinette water-cooled V8 engine, believed to be the very first V-form eight-cylinder internal combustion engine ever placed in production, designed by the Frenchman Léon Levavasseur. The Antoinette 8V incorporated manifold fuel injection, evaporative water cooling and other advanced features, weighed 95 kg (209 lb) and produced 37 kW (50 hp). Introduced in 1906, these engines were used by, among others, Santos Dumont, the early Voisin aircraft and Samuel Cody. American aviation engine designers quickly picked up on the V-8 engine concept from 1906 onwards as the era progressed, with both Glenn Curtiss' firm designing a series of liquid-cooled V-8 aviation engines culminating in the Curtiss OX-5 by the early years of World War I—another major American engine manufacturer, Hall-Scott, had their A-2 and A-3 overhead valve, liquid-cooled V-8s in production as early as 1908.

The British Green C.4 of 1908 followed the Wright's pattern of a four-cylinder inline water-cooled design but produced 52 hp (39 kW). It powered many successful pioneer aircraft including those of A.V. Roe.

Horizontally opposed designs were also used with some success. Santos-Dumont's Santos-Dumont Demoiselle No. 20 monoplane used first the 18 kW (24-hp output Dutheil et Chalmers liquid-cooled opposed twin engine, later replaced by a 22 kW (30 hp) Darracq-built engine of the same layout. The four-cylinder water-cooled de Havilland Iris achieved 45 hp but was little used, while the successful two-cylinder Nieuport design achieved 28 hp (21 kW) in 1910.

1909 saw radial engine forms rise to significance. The air-cooled Anzani 3-cylinder semi-radial or fan engine of 1909 (also built in a true, 120° cylinder angle radial form) developed only 25 hp (19 kW) but was much lighter than the liquid-cooled Antoinette, and was chosen by Louis Blériot for his cross-Channel flight. A major advance came with the introduction of the Seguin brothers' Gnome Omega seven-cylinder, air-cooled rotary engine, exhibited at the Paris Aero Salon 1n 1908 and first fitted to an aircraft in 1909. This radial-configuration engine was constructed in such a way that the entire crankcase and cylinder assembly rotated around a stationary crankshaft, itself fastened securely through the engine's rear attachment to the airframe, ensuring an adequate flow of cooling air over the cylinders even when the aircraft was not moving. Although this type had been introduced as long ago as 1887 by Lawrence Hargrave and built two years later by Hargrave for compressed-air power—with an experimental five-cylinder internal combustion rotary engine used by French inventor Félix Millet that same year to power an early motorcycle design — improvements made to the Seguin brothers' Gnome series of engine designs created a robust, relatively reliable and lightweight design which revolutionised aviation and would see continuous development over the next ten years. Fuel was introduced into each cylinder direct from the crankcase meaning that only an exhaust valve was required. Producing 37 kW (50 hp) for a dry weight of 75 kg (165 lb), this engine soon became one of the most widely used powerplants; the company went on to produce a number of similar engines producing more power, first by increasing the engine capacity and also by producing two-row variants. The larger and more powerful nine-cylinder. French-made Le Rhone 9C 80 hp rotary was introduced in 1913 and was widely adopted for military use.

Inline and vee types remained popular, with the German company Mercedes producing first a small number of water-cooled inline four-cylinder engines, then a series of water-cooled six-cylinder models. In 1913 they introduced the highly successful range of 75 to 120 kW (101 to 161 hp), SOHC-valvetrain design engines: the D.I to D.III series.

Another area of advance was the development of specialist manufacturers of propellers. Although the Wright Brothers had developed their own highly efficient propellers and Hiram Maxim had also carried out research on propeller design, much of this work was unknown, and the early pioneers such as Voisin and Santos Dumont had used inefficient propellers with flat aluminium blades mounted on a steel tube. The first truly efficient European propeller design was produced by Lucien Chauvière, who had studied the theory of propeller design while a student at the École des Arts et Métiers in Angers. Chauvière pioneered a sophisticated construction technique using laminations of walnut. A Chauvière propeller was used by Blériot in his flight across the English Channel, and the importance of Chauvière's contribution was recognised by his being awarded a silver medal by the Aero-Club de France.

=== Theoretical ===
The achievement of powered flight led to the establishment of centres for aeronautical research in many countries. In 1907 Ludwig Prandtl, who had joined the University of Göttingen university in 1904, founded the Modellversuchsanstalt für Aerodynamik der Motorluftschiff-Studiengesellschaft [society for testing aerodynamic models of powered airships ]. The University of Göttingen would become a world leader in aerodynamic research. In 1909 Henri Deutsch de la Meurthe endowed a department devoted to aeronautics at the University of Paris In France the famous engineer Gustave Eiffel performed a series of experiments to investigate the effects of wind resistance on moving bodies by dropping test apparatus down a wire suspended from the Eiffel Tower: he later built a wind tunnel at the base of the Tower, in which models of many pioneer French aircraft were tested and carried out pioneering work on aerofoil sections.

== Pilot training ==
Many of the pioneer constructors started their own flying schools. Pilot training was rudimentary: although the Wright Model A used by the Wright Brothers for training in Europe had been fitted with dual control, dual-control aircraft were not generally used, and aspiring pilots would often simply be put in charge of a machine and encouraged to progress from taxying the aircraft then short straight line flights to flights involving turns. Sometimes ground handling experience was built up using special short-span machines that were incapable of flight, such as the Blériot Pinguin. Most flight training was done early in the morning or in the evening when winds tend to be low, and the time taken to qualify for a licence was greatly dependent on the weather.

== Popular impact ==
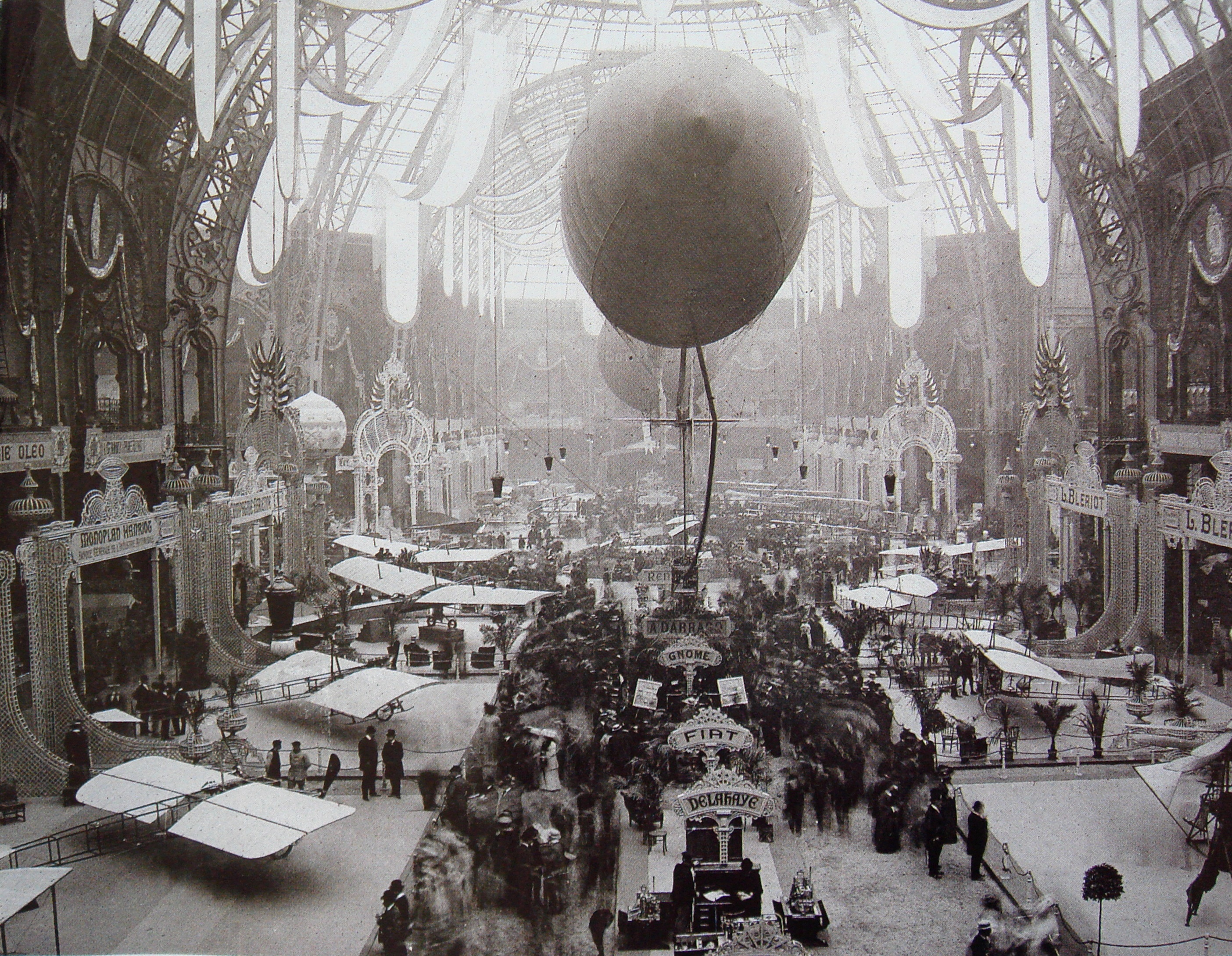
The 1909 Paris Salon Aerienne

Santos-Dumont's airship flights had already made him a celebrity, and while ballooning remained a popular activity for the wealthy, heavier-than-air aviation quickly became a popular spectator sport, and the major centres of aviation such as Issy-les-Moulineaux, Brooklands and Hendon Aerodrome attracted crowds of curious onlookers. The first aviation meet was held in Juivisy in May 1909 and was followed by the Grand Semaine d'aviation in August: later in the year aviation meetings were held in England at Doncaster and Blackpool, and exhibition flights were made in many European cities, including Berlin, Vienna and Bucharest.

The first public flying display at Brooklands, already established as a motor-racing circuit, was made at the end of October 1909 by Louis Paulhan: around 2,000 spectators watched him fly to a height of 720 feet. Brooklands soon became one of Britain's major centres of aviation activity, with several flying schools. In 1910 Louis Paulhan and Claude Grahame-White competed to win the Daily Mail prize for a flight between London and Manchester, attracting Major long-distance aeroplane races, such as the Circuit of Europe and the Aerial Derby began in 1911 - and also attracted enormous crowds; while in the same year in the United States, a suburb of Chicago, Illinois had an important aerodrome-format aviation site dedicated in Cicero, IL that operated for several years before its closure and relocation in 1916.

== Military interest ==
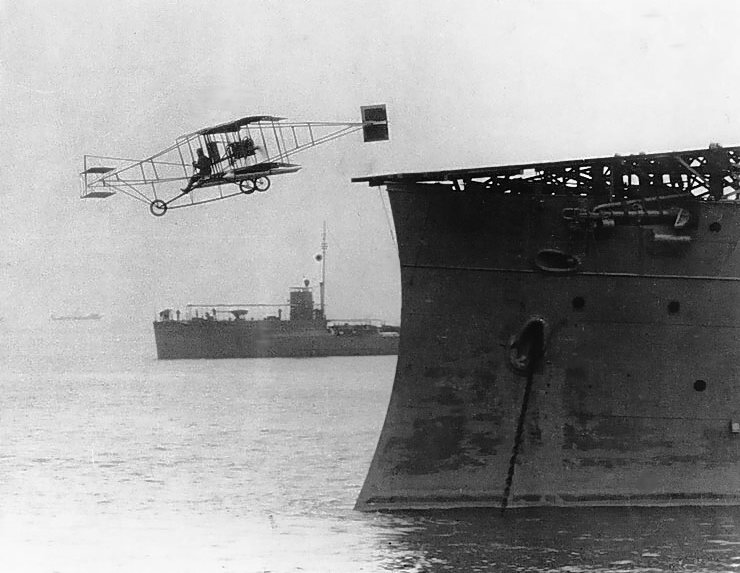
Ely takes off from the USS Birmingham, 14 November 1910

The military use of balloons was already widespread: balloons had been employed in the American Civil War – where Ferdinand von Zeppelin had his first exposure to lighter-than-air flight – and the Boer War. Many military traditionalists refused to regard aeroplanes as more than toys, but these were counterbalanced by advocates of the new technology, and both the US and the major European nations had established heavier-than-air aviation arms by the end of 1911.

France had the most air-minded army. The balloon school at Chalais-Meudon had long been a centre of innovation, and in December 1909, the French Department of War began to send army officers and NCOs for pilot training at civilian schools. In March 1910, the Établissement Militaire d'Aviation was created to conduct experiments with aircraft, and on 22 October 1910 the Aéronautique Militaire was created as a branch of the Army. In February 1912 the French military estimates set aside twelve million francs (equal to nearly half a million pounds) for aviation, and claimed to have 208 aeroplanes, with the intention of increasing that number to 334 by the end of the year, At this time the British government planned to spend £133,000 on aviation, of which £83,000 was for heavier-than-air machines.

In England experiments with heavier-than-air flight had been made at Army Balloon Factory at Farnborough under Colonel John Capper. In October 1908 Samuel Cody had flown the British Army Aeroplane No.1 for a distance of 424 m (1,391 ft) and J. W. Dunne had made a number of successful gliding experiments, performed in great secrecy at Blair Atholl in Scotland, but in 1909 the British War office had stopped all official funding of heavier-than-air aviation, preferring to spend its money on airships. In an effort to rationalise aeronautical research the Secretary of State for War, Richard Haldane established the Advisory Committee for Aeronautics and appointed Mervyn O'Gorman, an electrical engineer of great managerial skill, as director of the balloon factory:

In 1911 the War Office established the Air Battalion, formed of the No. 1 (Airship) Company at Farnborough and the No 2 (Aeroplane) Company at Lark Hill on Salisbury Plain. The first military pilots had to learn to fly at their own expense, many doing so at the Bristol school, established in 1910 at Lark Hill. Two Bristol Boxkites from the school participated in the 1910 army manoeuvres of Salisbury Plain, one of them equipped with a radio transmitter. In late 1910 Francis McClean offered to loan two aircraft to the Admiralty to be used to train naval officers to fly and George Cockburn offered to act as a flight instructor. Four officers were selected for flight training at Eastchurch, reporting for training on 1 March 1911 and gaining their licences (wings) in six weeks. In October 1911, the Royal Navy purchased the two aircraft and established the Naval Flying School at Eastchurch. In 1912 a contract was given to Vickers to produce the first aircraft specifically designed for aerial combat, the Experimental Fighting Biplane No.1. Previously, Voisin had exhibited an aircraft impractically fitted with a heavy mitrailleuse at the 1911 Paris Aero Salon, and the French had also experimented with fitting machine-guns to existing types.

In the United States the Wright Brothers had, after many attempts, managed to attract the serious attention of the Army, and in December 1907 the U.S. Army Signal Corps issued a specification for a military aircraft. Orville Wright made a successful demonstration to the Army on 3 September 1908.

On 17 September 1908 a flight was made with Lieutenant Thomas Selfridge on board as an official observer. A few minutes into the flight at an altitude of about 100 feet (30 m), a propeller split and shattered, sending the Flyer out of control. Selfridge suffered a fractured skull in the crash and died that evening in the nearby Army hospital, becoming the first person to die in an aeroplane crash. Orville was also seriously injured. Aeronautical Division, U.S. Signal Corps The American military pioneered naval aviation, with the first take-off from a ship being made on 14 November 1910 by Eugene Ely using a Curtiss biplane flown from a temporary platform erected over the bow of the scout cruiser USS Birmingham. Two months later, on 18 January 1911, Ely landed on a platform on the armoured cruiser USS Pennsylvania.

The earliest recorded use of explosive ordnance of any type from an aircraft occurred on November 1, 1911, when Italian pilot Giulio Gavotti dropped several, grapefruit-sized cipelli grenades on Ottoman positions in Libya – Gavotti's raid caused no casualties, functionally only resulting in the earliest known case of air-delivered harassing fire—but marked the first known use of an aircraft for military combat purposes.

The first actual use of aircraft in a war was carried out by Italy during the Italo-Turkish War of 1912, where aircraft were used for reconnaissance (including taking aerial photographs of enemy positions) and bombing. Aircraft were also used in the Balkan Wars of 1912–1913.
