= De Pischoff 1907 biplane =

de Pischoff 1907 biplane
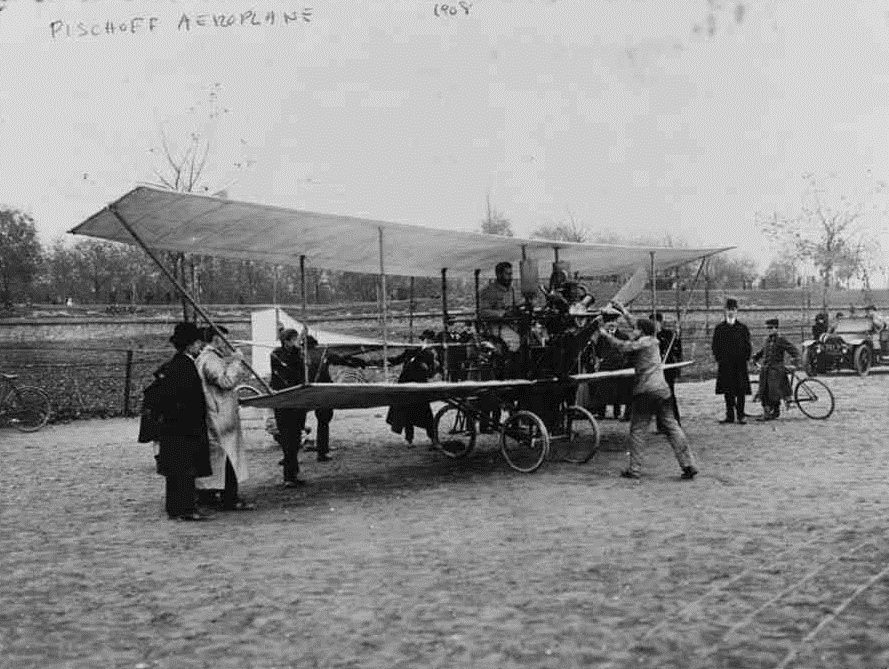

General information
- Type: Experimental aircraft
- National origin: France
- Manufacturer: Chauvière
- Designer: Alfred de Pischoff
- Number built: 1

History
- Introduction date: 1907

The de Pischoff 1907 biplane was a French experimental aircraft designed by Alfred de Pischoff in 1907. It is notable for being the first known example of a tractor biplane. It was built by Lucien Chauvière, later known for his laminated wood propellers.

== Design and development ==
de Pischoff had previously experimented with a biplane glider derived from Ferdinand Ferber's Type VI of 1904, and some elements of the earlier machine may have been used for the 1907 machine. This was an unequal-span, single bay biplane powered by a 25 hp (18 kW) Anzani engine mounted in the middle of the gap between the wings. Booms carried the aft-mounted elongated triangular fin and horizontal stabiliser, with rectangular rudder and elevator. It was mounted on a tricycle undercarriage with two front wheels below the wings' leading edge and a third aft of the trailing edge.

Flight trials at Issy-les-Moulineaux in November 1907 were largely unsuccessful, although a flight of 500 metres was made on 17 December and after the aircraft was damaged in an accident it was abandoned. De Pischoff did not attempt to develop the design and the next aircraft he built was a tandem seat monoplane designed in collaboration with Paul Koechlin.

== Specifications ==
Data from Opdycke 1999 p.205

General characteristics

- Crew: 1
- Wingspan: 10 m (32 ft 10 in)
- Wing area: 25 m^{2} (270 sq ft)
- Powerplant: 1 × Anzani 3 cylinder air cooled fan-configuration, 19 kW (25 hp)
- Propellers: 2-bladed Chauvière
