= Blériot XIII =

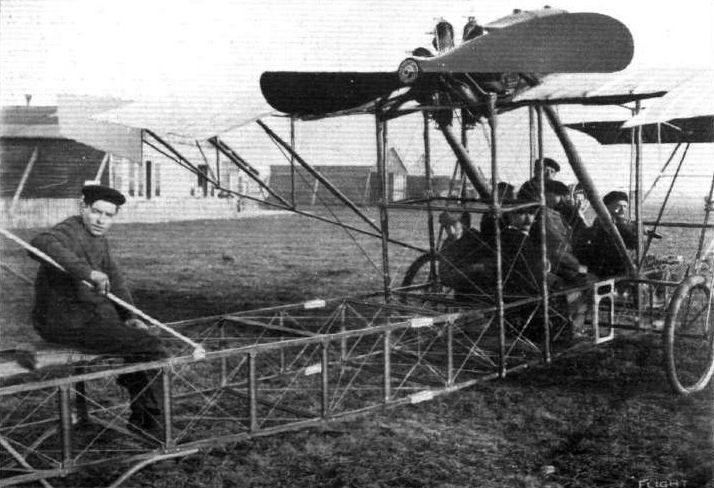

General information
- Type: Passenger aircraft
- National origin: France
- Manufacturer: Recherches Aéronautique Louis Blériot
- Number built: 1

History
- First flight: 1911

The Blériot XIII was an experimental passenger-carrying aircraft built during 1910 by Recherches Aéronautique Louis Blériot. It is notable for setting a record for passenger carrying flights, and was probably intended as a developmental aircraft for the Blériot XXIV Limousine.

== Design ==
The Type XIII differed considerably from the series of tractor configuration monoplanes with which Louis Blériot is generally associated. It was a high-wing pusher configuration monoplane, with the 100 hp (75 kW) Gnome engine inset into the trailing edge of the square-tipped wing, which had inset ailerons and was braced by a deep wire-braced truss underneath. The wing was mounted on a conventional wire-braced wooden box girder using six uprights and a pair of substantial diagonal members to transmit the thrust of the engine to the main airframe. The pilot sat immediately in front of the wing leading edge, with the four passengers seated two by two behind him. A front-mounted elevator was carried on two pairs of V-booms, and a fixed lifting horizontal surface with a rectangular rudder above it was mounted on top of the rear of the fuselage structure. The main undercarriage consisted of a pair of wheels each in a trailing arm structure which was free to slide on upright tubes mounted outboard of the fuselage, and sprung by bungee cords.

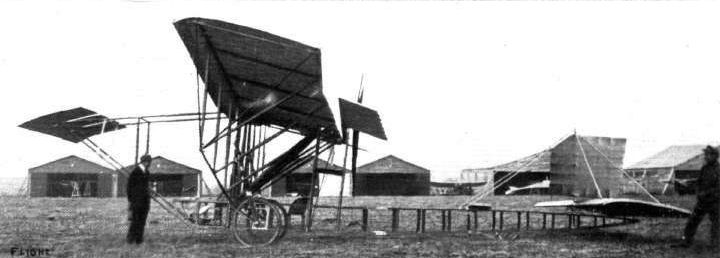
Side view of the Blériot XIII.

== Operational history ==
On 2 February 1911 Léon Lemartin broke a world record by flying the Type XIII with eight passengers. Later, he succeeded in flying the aircraft with as many as twelve other people on board. Flights carrying large numbers of people were in vogue in France at the time, and the Aero Club de France introduced a regulation for such record attempts, stipulating that each person should weigh a minimum of 75 kg (165 lb). Lamartin's load for his eight-passenger list was reported to have been 435.5 kg (960 lb), so his record would not have been ratified under the new rules.

== The Blériot XXIV ==
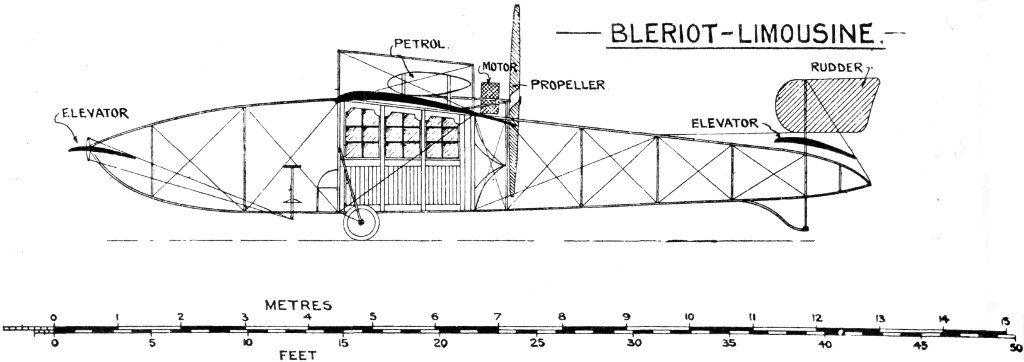
Drawing of the Blériot XXIV, taken from the 1912 edition of Jane's All the World's Aircraft

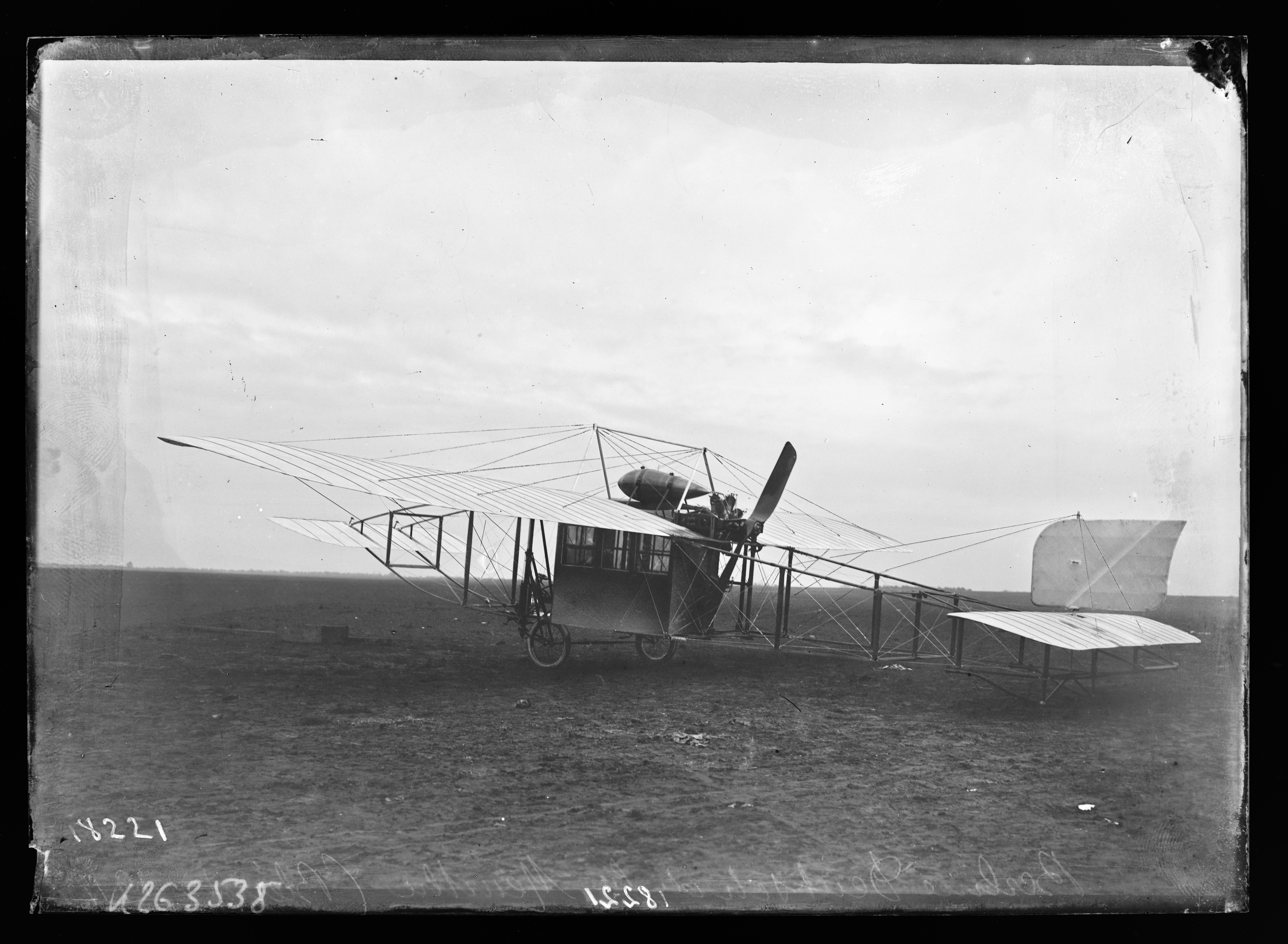

In late 1911 Blériot produced an aircraft of similar configuration which had been built to the order of Henri Deutsch de la Meurthe, the Blériot XXIV "Limousine" (also referred to as the Bleriot Aeronef and the Bleriot Berline), and it is probable that the Type XIII was intended as a developmental aircraft for this machine. This aircraft featured an enclosed cabin with mica windows for the passengers, built by the Rothchild coachbuilding company, with the pilot sitting in front of it, his only protection being a small conical windshield attached to the front outrigger cross-bracing wires. A speaking tube was provided to allow the passengers to communicate with the pilot. It differed considerably from the Type XIII in its constructional details. The wings had elliptical ends, similar to those of the Blériot XI and used wing warping for lateral control. They were conventionally braced using wires, those above the wing being connected to a cabane made up of a pair of inverted V-struts with a longitudinal tube connecting the apexes: under this was a large teardrop shaped fuel tank. The tail surfaces were mounted of four wire-braced booms, and the front elevator on four curved booms attached to the front of the cabin. It was initially powered by a 100 hp (75 kW) Gnome 14 Omega-Omega, which was later replaced by a 140 hp (100 kW) Gnome 14 Gamma-Gamma. It was 14 m (46 ft) long with a wingspan of 13 m (43 ft) and, with fuel but without passengers, weighed 700 kg (1,540 lb).

With the 140 hp Gnome fitted it was successfully flown at Étampes, carrying up to 300 kg (660 lb) of ballast in place of passengers.

== Specifications (Type XIII) ==
Data from Opdycke 1999 p. 55

General characteristics

- Crew: 1
- Capacity: 4
- Length: 12 m (39 ft 4 in)
- Wingspan: 13 m (42 ft 8 in)
- Wing area: 40 m^{2} (430 sq ft)
- Empty weight: 600 kg (1,323 lb)
- Powerplant: 1 × Gnome 14 Omega-Omega 14 cylinder two-row rotary, air-cooled, 75 kW (100 hp)
- Propellers: 2-bladed
