= Léon Lemartin =

French aviator and engineer (1883–1911)

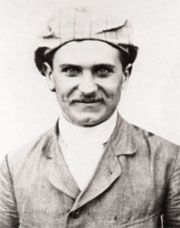
- Lemartin
- Born: 20 October 1883; Dunes, Tarn-et-Garonne, France
- Died: 18 June 1911 (aged 27); Vincennes, Paris, France
- Occupations: Aircraft engineer and pilot
- Known for: The world's first test pilot, by contract with Louis Blériot in the year 1910, record breaking pioneer aviator who carried seven, eight, eleven passengers

Théodore Clovis Edmond "Léon" Lemartin (20 October 1883 – 18 June 1911) was a French pioneer aviator and test pilot who set a world record on 3 February 1911 at Pau, France when he carried seven passengers in a Blériot XIII Aerobus. He then took eight, eleven and thirteen passengers aloft the following month. He is also known as the world's first professional test pilot.

The son of a blacksmith, in 1902 he became a graduate Gadz'Art, an engineer of 'Arts and Crafts' of the École Nationale Supérieure d'Arts et Métiers (ENSAM) – a prestigious university (grande ecole) specialising in engineering. His aeronautic career included working with Gabriel Voisin, the Seguin brothers, Henri Farman, Ernest Archdeacon and Louis Blériot. He was present when Blériot made the historic first crossing of the English Channel in 1909. On 4 October 1910 he was awarded Aviator's Certificate number 249 by the Aéro-Club de France.

On 24 May 1911, three weeks before his death, he reportedly surpassed the world speed record although it was never officially recognized. He achieved 128.418 km/h (79.795 mph) over the 33 kilometres (21 mi) flight between Etampes and Toury in a Blériot using his own enhancements to the Gnome Omega 50 hp (37 kW) motor.

He died in a crash on 18 June 1911 during the Paris–London–Paris leg of Le Circuit Européen (Tour of Europe) air race. He was still within sight of the reportedly 'up to 1 million' spectators at the take-off in Vincennes.

== Early life ==
Lemartin was born in the commune of Dunes in the Department of Tarn-et-Garonne in south west France. From the moment of his birth he was known as Léon, but his forenames (Théodore, Clovis, Edmond) honoured both his father and both of his grandfathers. When he graduated in 1902 and required authorisations to work he discovered a mistake on his birth certificate, that his family name of 'Le Martin' had been written 'Lemartin', but he decided that it was easier to adopt the 'new' spelling.

His father Edmond was a blacksmith and farrier (Fr. Maréchal-ferrant), and a member of the 'Compagnons du Tour de France' (a French community of craftsmen and artisans). He was also the inventor of several 'furnaces maréchal', some of which were patented. Edmond believed strongly in both science and technology so Léon spent many hours working in the forge learning practical skills.

Once Lemartin achieved his 'school certificate' he was enrolled at the 'Ecole Pratique' d'Agen'. He was a gifted and serious student who advanced quickly so that in October 1899, when he was just sixteen, he left his native Brulhois area and travelled almost 500 kilometres (310 mi) to enroll at the 'Institute of Arts et Métiers' in Aix-en-Provence where he became a Gadz'Art, the nickname given to the students and alumni of the École Nationale Supérieure d'Arts et Métiers (ENSAM), a prestigious university (grande ecole) specialising in engineering. At the age of nineteen, in 1902, he became a qualified Gadz'Art, an engineer of 'Arts and Crafts' (Ingénieur des Arts et Métiers) and moved to Paris.

In December 1902 Lemartin met aviation enthusiast Louise Soriano, who had divorced the Comte Charles de Lambert and married Ricardo Soriano von Hermansdorff Sholtz, Marquis de Ivanrey. Lemartin and Louise worked together during their joint airship project and subsequently married, upon which he adopted her daughter Jane (or Jeanne) de Lambert from her first marriage. Louise died in December 1907 and is buried in Dunes. Lemartin then married Madeleine, née Baas, and they had three children: Louise, Simone and Léone. Jane de Lambert also grew up in the family. After his death, Madeleine married his brother Albert and had two more children, Maurice and Roger.

== Airship project ==
Lemartin had an early interest in ballooning and, learning from Alberto Santos-Dumont, he began to build an airship in collaboration with the Spanish aristocrat, financier, engineer, inventor and adventurer Ricardo Soriano von Hermansdorff Sholtz. The project failed due to a fire, so Lemartin applied to the 'L'École Duvignau', but without success.

== Gnome years ==
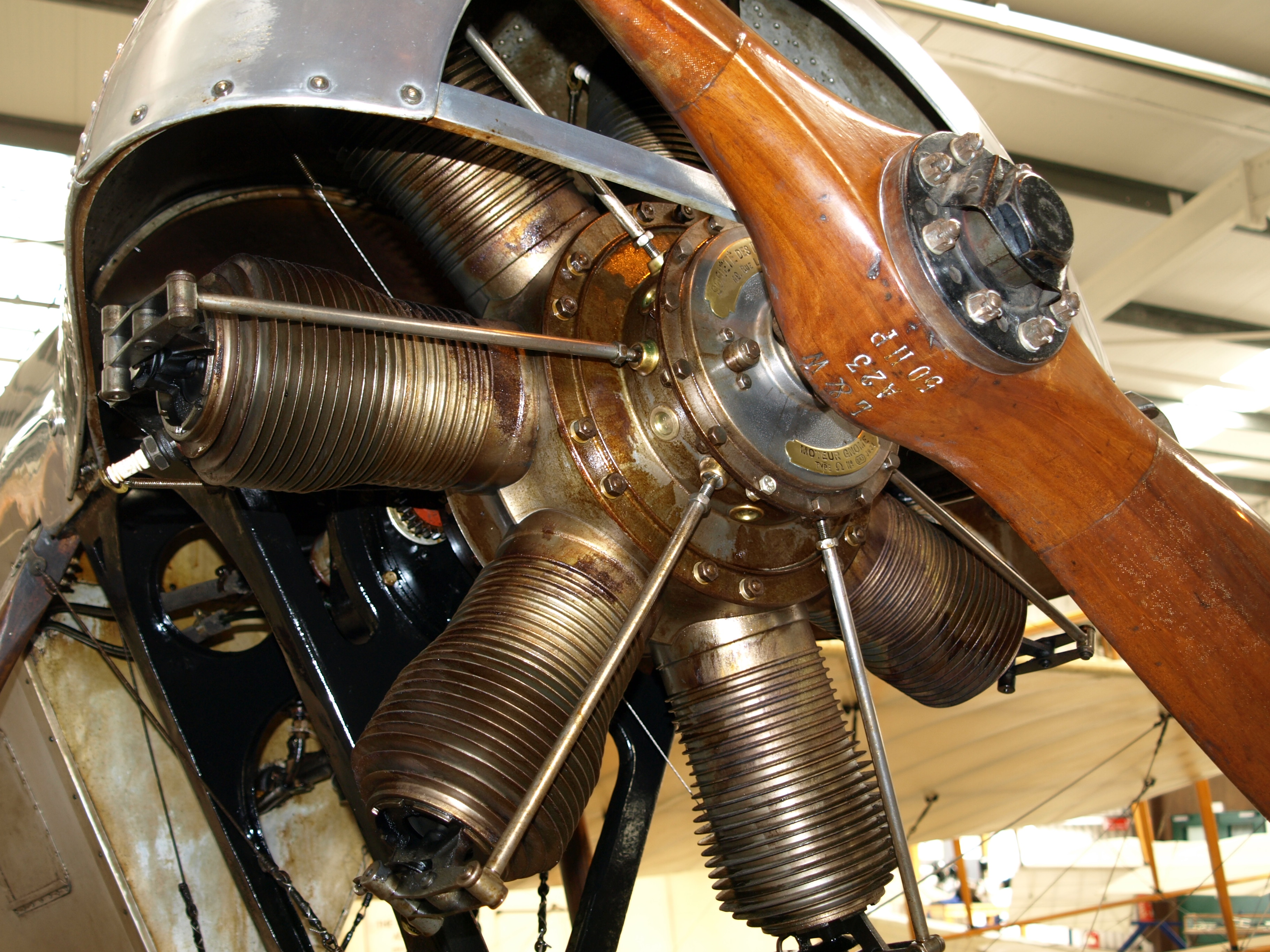
Gnome 7 Omega at the Shuttleworth Collection. Brown staining caused by burnt castor oil

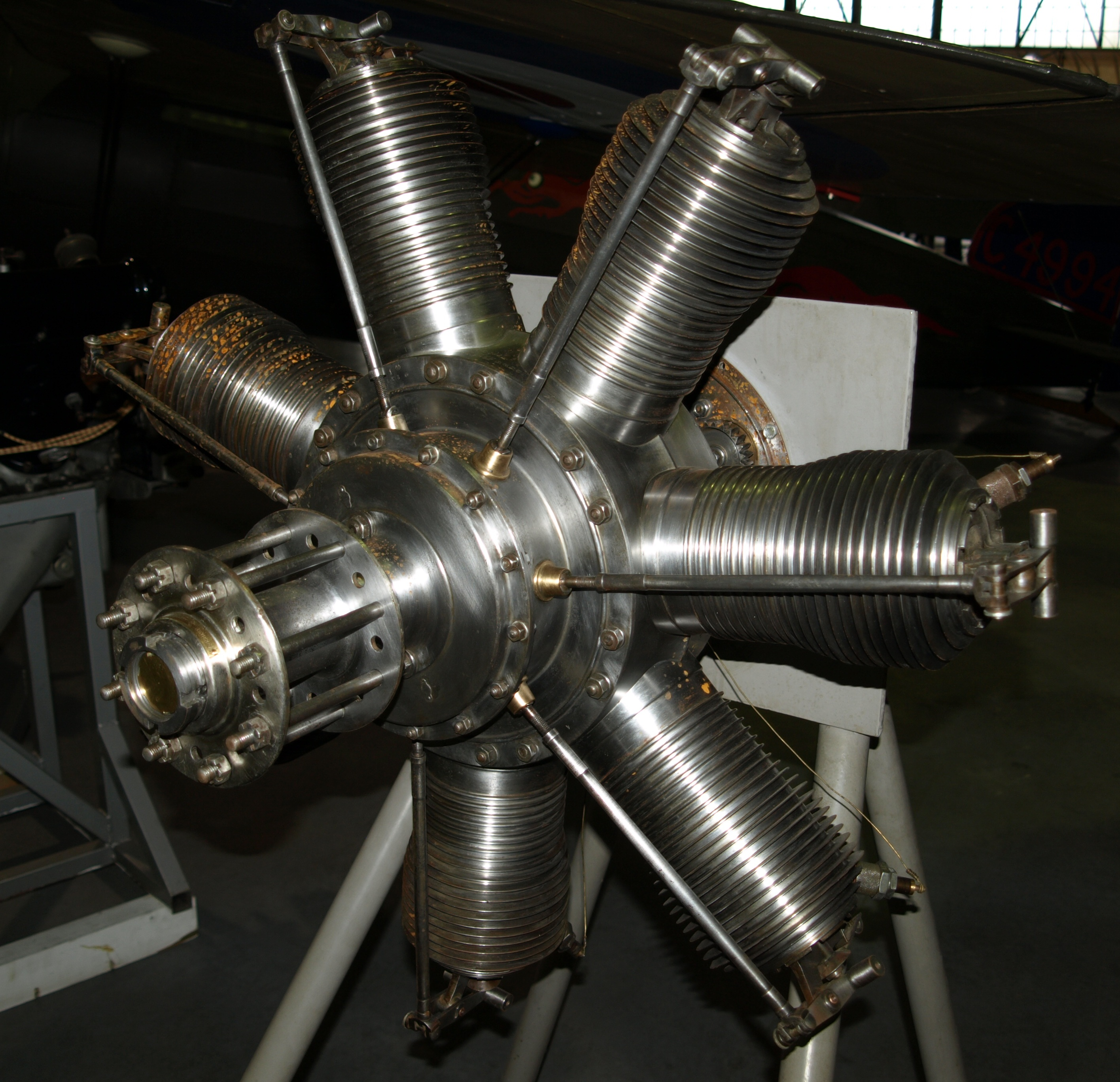
Gnome 7 Omega on display at the Royal Air Force Museum London

In the early 1900s, Lemartin started work at the automobile manufacturer Charron, based in Puteaux Paris. He later moved to E.N.V., and later worked for Gabriel Voisin on the structure of his early experimental glider which was towed into the air from the river Seine, flying 600 metres (2,000 ft), in 1905.

Lemartin was apparently not convinced by the Voisin approach and agreed with Louis Bleriot that the engine was key to achieving powered heavier-than-air flight in a monoplane. Thus, he joined Société Des Moteurs Gnome (the Gnome motor company founded by Louis and Laurent Seguin in 1905) where he worked on their 7-cylinder Gnome Omega rotary engine project, and became a key developer of the basic idea. The Omega set a benchmark with its delivery of 50 hp (37 kW) from 75 kilograms (165 lb). He also had a special role in the company whereby he was seconded to directly support the aviators who were using the Omega.

At Gnome, he worked with Jules Védrines, another young engineer who went on to win the special consolation prize in the 1911 Daily Mail Round-Britain Air race and the overall prize in the 1911 Paris to Madrid air race.

One of the notable events of the Grande Semaine d'Aviation held at Reims in August 1909 was the public debut of the Gnome rotary engine, and Gnome-engined aircraft won first and third places in the distance prize. Henri Farman's winning flight of (180 kilometres (110 mi)) was made with a Gnome engine which had been installed immediately before the flight, his previous engine having proved unreliable. He used the same aircraft to win the passenger carrying prize.

== Blériot years ==
On 20 August 1910, Lemartin signed a contract to join Louis Bleriot's flying school to train as a pilot and work as an engineer. By this contract, he becomes the first ever official Test Pilot in the world . He qualified six weeks later on 4 October. His registration number was 249, and he was assigned to Bleriot's schools at Étampes and Pau. His contract entitled him to 400 francs per month (about €1,100 in 2006), 30 francs per flight (~€80), and 32,500 francs (~€87,000) to his widow in case of death. On 4 October 1910 he was awarded Aviator's Certificate number 249 by the Aéro-Club de France.

On 3 February 1911, at Pau, he broke the world record by carrying seven passengers in a Blériot XIII, surpassing Roger Sommer's previous record of six. During March 1911, he went on to increase the record to eight, then eleven, and finally thirteen passengers, including the aviators Jeanne Herveu (founder of the first flying school for women), and Paul Wyss, a Swiss pilot who was training at the Bleriot school in Pau at the time.

Despite its weight, my monoplane lifted into the air perfectly. I had a very clear vision and next to me the passengers were installed under the wings, like the Imperial Parisian omnibus, watching the hills roll by ... and I'm happy to be their pilot.

— Léon Lemartin, The Independent, February 1910.

On 24 May 1911, three weeks before his death, he reportedly surpassed the world speed record, although it was never officially authorised. He achieved 128.418 km/h (79.795 mph) between Etampes and Toury in a Blériot using "his own" enhanced model of the Gnome 50 hp (37 kW) motor. (The official record of 125 km/h (78 mph) was set by Leblanc on 12 June during qualifying for the Gordon Bennett Trophy.)

On 1 June 1911, he signed a new contract with Louis Bleriot, becoming a member of the race team to compete at major events and receive one third of any prizes won. The total prize money for the event was 450,000 francs (about €1,200,000 in 2006), made up of a number of separate prizes for the various stages of the race.

== Death and commemoration ==
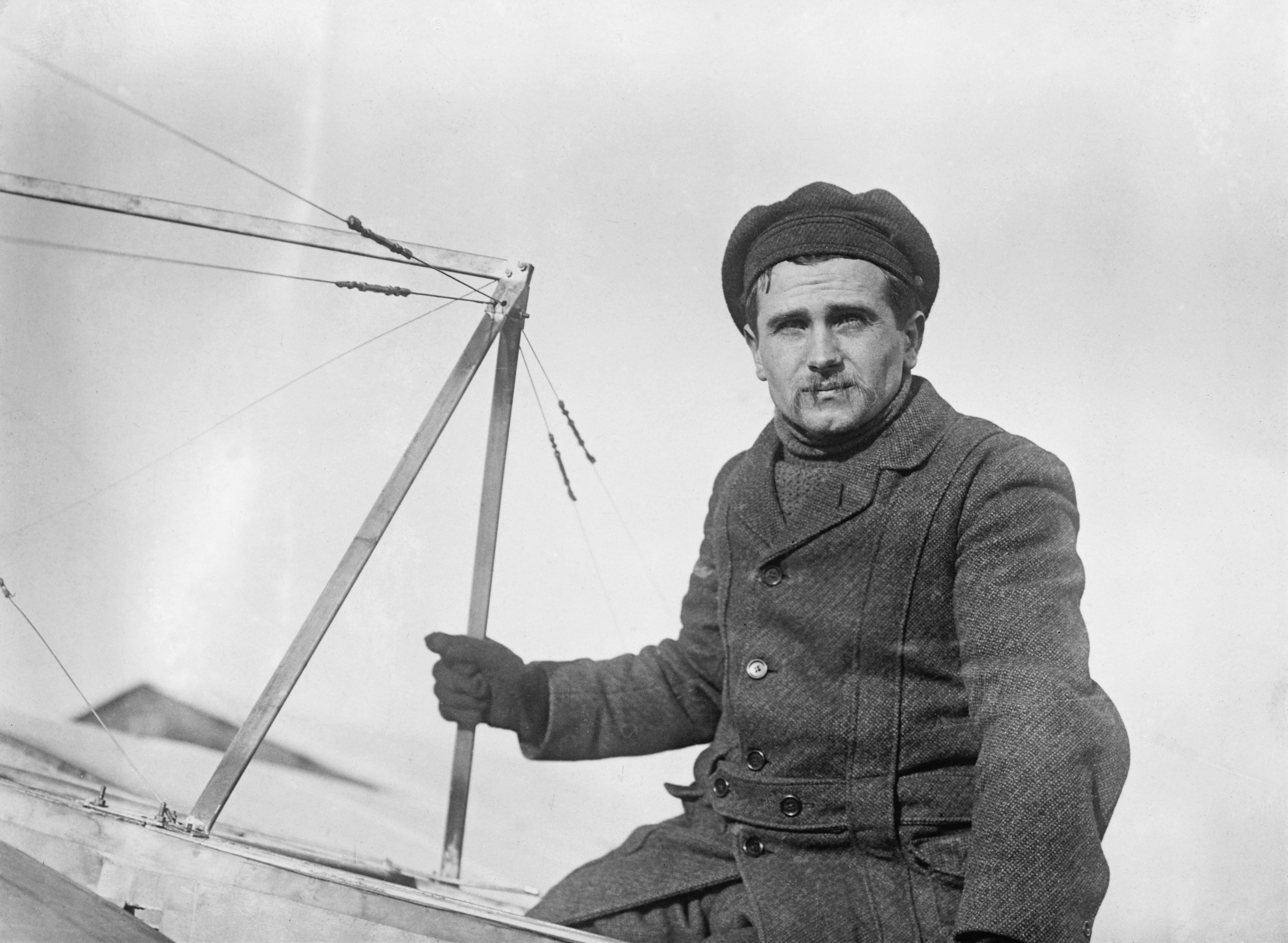
Lemartin in circa 1910

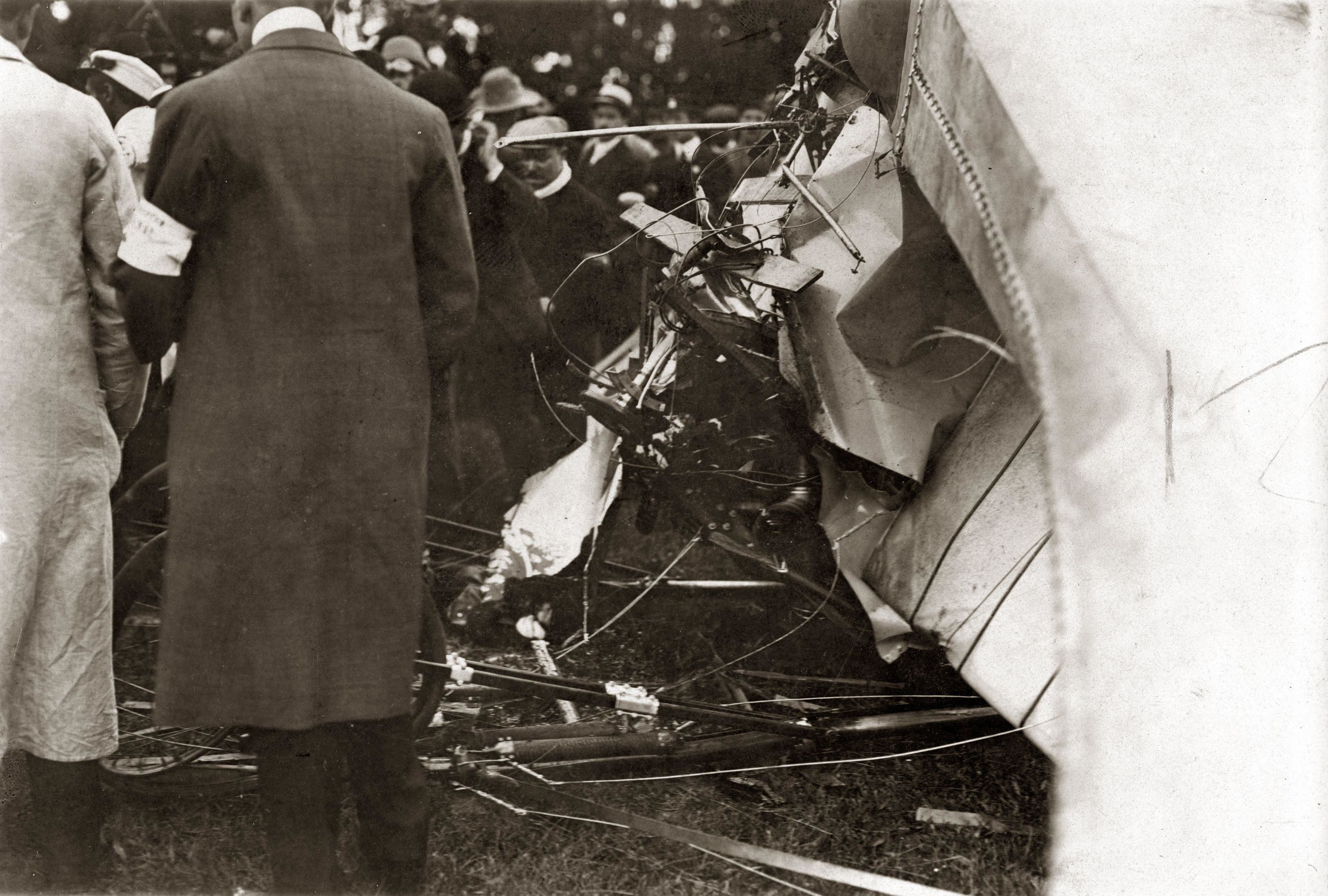
Wreckage of a Blériot monoplane in which Lemartin had a fatal accident (1911)

Lemartin died in a crash on 18 June 1911 during the first leg of Le Circuit Européen (Tour of Europe) air race. He was still within sight of the reportedly 'up to 1 million' spectators at the take-off in Vincennes.

The Circuit Européen (Tour of Europe) was his first competition. The night before his departure from Vincennes, he was working on the machines of his teammates Gustav Hamel and Lieutenant Jean Louis Conneau (flying under the name André Beaumont) who went on to win both Le Circuit Européen and Paris-Rome. Thus the next morning, 18 June, Lemartin was tired. That morning, the weather was not good and Roland Garros, who was the first to start, had to scratch. He advised Lemartin against flying because "les ailes souples ne vont pas tenir!" ("the wings are too flexible and will not hold"), but Lemartin wanted to achieve his dream of racing before a million spectators.

According to The New York Times of 19 June 1911:

The wind was rising at the start of the contest, and Le Martin, who was one of the most experienced aviators in France, rocked about a good deal as his machine left the ground and swept across the field. His aeroplane had reached the woods, a quarter of a mile beyond the barriers, when it was observed to pitch swiftly downward and into the trees. Le Martin was using a biplane, [sic] which was broken badly as it fell at the foot of an oak tree. A corner of the motor struck Le Martin's head, crushing his skull, and his right leg was also broken in two places. The aviator was barely alive when he was taken away by Red Cross surgeons, whose stations surrounded the field. The crowds removed their hats as the wounded aviator was carried past, or as word passed among the people that he was dead. Le Martin was alive when he reached the hospital, but expired a few minutes afterwards.

Soon after the crash, Madame Bleriot arrived at the site. Ernest Monis, the Prime Minister of France, who was a spectator, sent his doctor, but Lemartin died on arrival at the hospital Saint-Antoine in Vincennes. Coincidentally, two other pilots in the race were killed in separate accidents on the same day.

Despite his brief career, Lemartin is considered one of the pioneers of French aviation. He was the 59th aviation pioneer to die.

Lemartin is buried at Dunes (Tarn-et-Garonne), where both a street and the airport (Piste Théodore Léon Lemartin) bear his name.44.108840°N 0.773500°E

His widow Madeleine, who received an insurance allocation of 32,500 francs, continued to raise his three children, Louise, Simone and Léone, plus Jane de Lambert. Madeleine subsequently married Léon's brother Albert and they had two more children, Maurice and Roger.

Lemartin's only grandson, Jacques Dalmon, wrote his grandfather's biography in 1994 (Lemartin, pilote-aviateur). He also published a new revision in 2009 in co-operation with Lemartin's great grandson, Olivier Dalmon (Léon Lemartin, Chef-Pilote de la Maison Blériot).

== See also ==
- List of fatalities from aviation accidents
