= Tractor configuration =

Aircraft design with front propeller

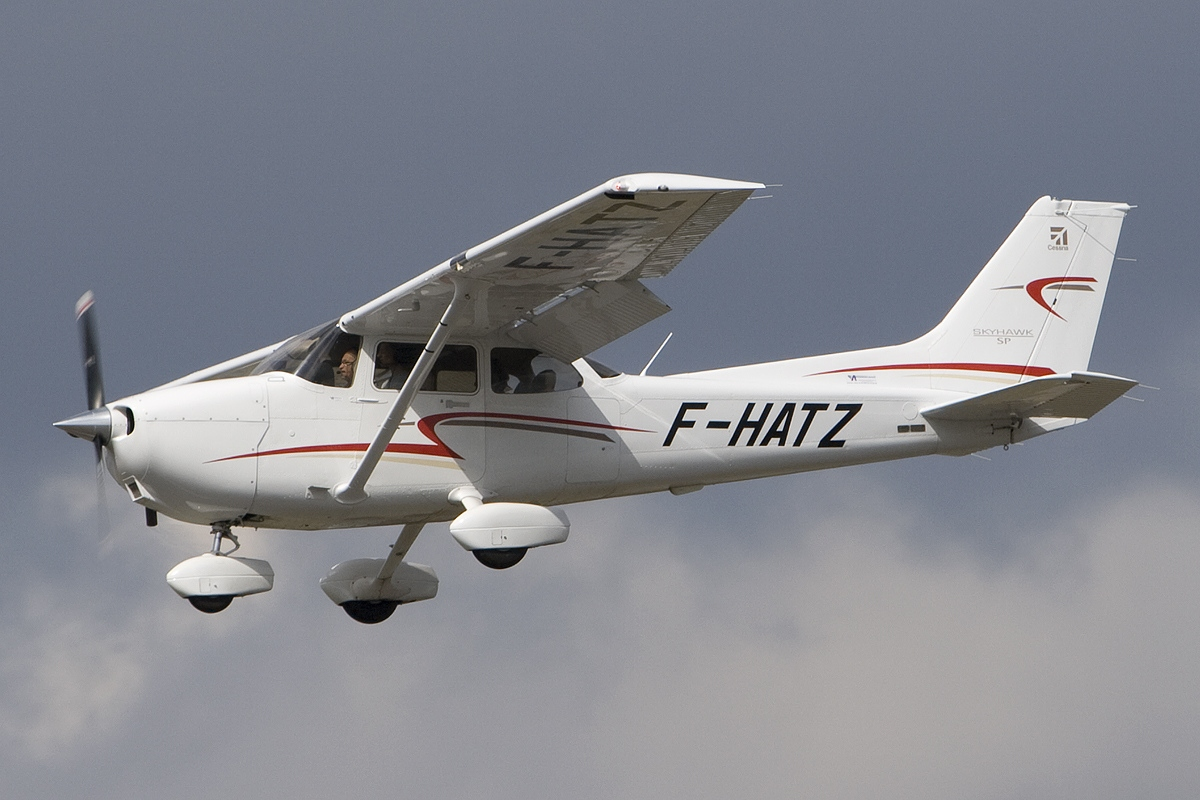
The Cessna 172, a tractor configuration aircraft, and the most popular airplane ever produced

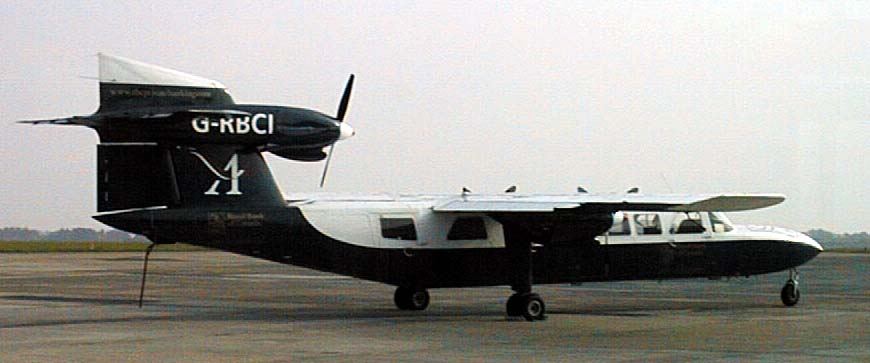
A Britten-Norman Trislander aircraft (with an unusual 3rd tractor engine on the tail) at Guernsey Airport, Channel Islands

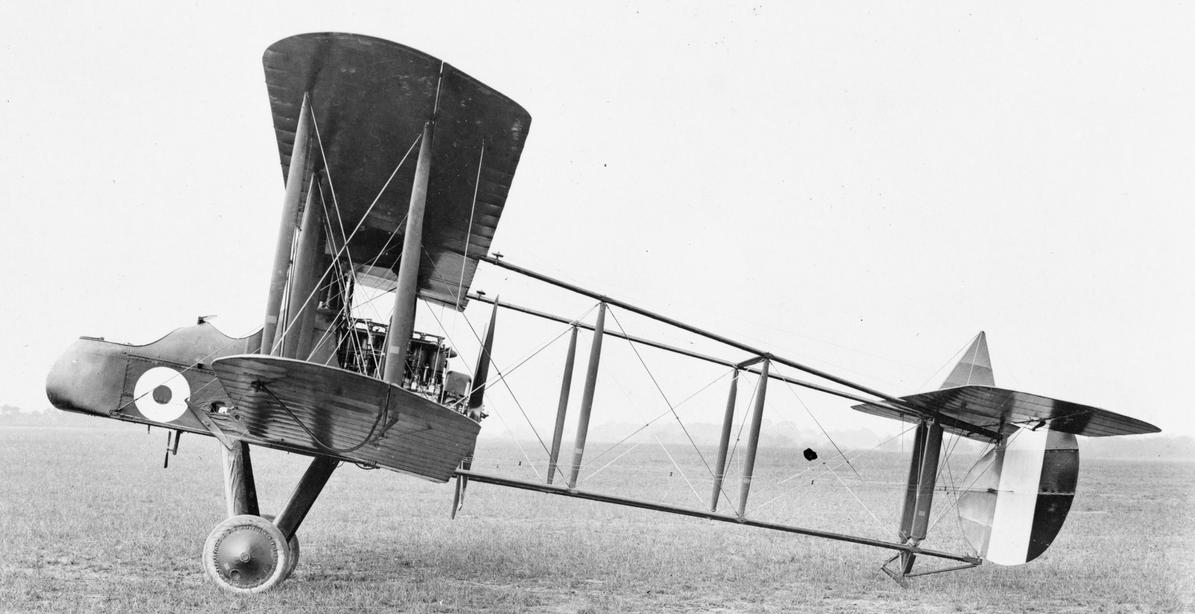
The Royal Aircraft Factory FE2 is an example of a pusher configuration

In aviation, a tractor configuration is a propeller-driven fixed-wing aircraft with its engine mounted with the propeller in front, so that the aircraft is "pulled" through the air. This is the usual configuration; the pusher configuration places the airscrew behind, and "pushes" the aircraft forward. Through common usage, the word "propeller" has come to mean any airscrew, whether it pulls or pushes the aircraft.

In the early years of powered aviation both tractor and pusher designs were common. However, by the midpoint of the First World War, interest in pushers declined and the tractor configuration dominated. Today, propeller-driven aircraft are assumed to be tractors unless stated otherwise.

== Origins ==
The first successful airplanes to have a "tractor" configuration were the 1907 Santos-Dumont Demoiselle and Blériot VII.

The first biplane airplane to have a "tractor" configuration was the Goupy No.2 (first flight on 11 March 1909) designed by Mario Calderara and financed by Ambroise Goupy at the French firm Blériot Aéronautique. It was the fastest airplane when it was made. At that time a distinction was made between a propeller ("pushes the machine", akin to a ship's propeller) and a tractor-[air]screw ("pulls the machine through the air"). The Royal Flying Corps called the tractors "Bleriot type" after Louis Blériot, and pushers "Farman type".

== Firing guns through the propeller ==
A disadvantage of a single-engine tractor military aircraft was that it was initially impossible to fire a gun through the propeller arc without striking the blades. Early solutions included mounting guns (rifles or machine guns) to fire around the propeller arc, either at an angle to the side – which made aiming difficult – or on the top wing of a biplane so that the bullets passed over the propeller arc.

The first system to fire through the propeller was developed by French engineer Eugene Gilbert for Morane-Saulnier, and involved fitting strong metal "deflector wedges" to the propeller blades of a Morane-Saulnier L monoplane, so that bullets fired when a propeller blade obstructed the line of fire were deflected rather than damaging the propeller. It was employed with immediate success by French aviator Roland Garros and was also used on at least one Sopwith Tabloid of the Royal Naval Air Service.

A better solution was a gun synchronizer, which utilized a synchronization gear to shoot only at instants when the line of fire was unobstructed, developed by aircraft pioneer Anthony Fokker and fitted to the Fokker E.I monoplane in 1915. The first British "tractor" designed to be fitted with synchronization gear was the Sopwith 1½ Strutter. which entered service in early 1916.

The problem of firing through the propeller's arc was avoided by passing the gun barrel through the propeller's hub or spinner – first used in production military aircraft with the 1917 French SPAD S.XII – or mounting guns in the wings, as was used from the early 1930s until propeller engines were superseded in the jet age.

== See also ==
- Pusher configuration
- Push-pull configuration
