= Blériot VII =

Historical French airplane

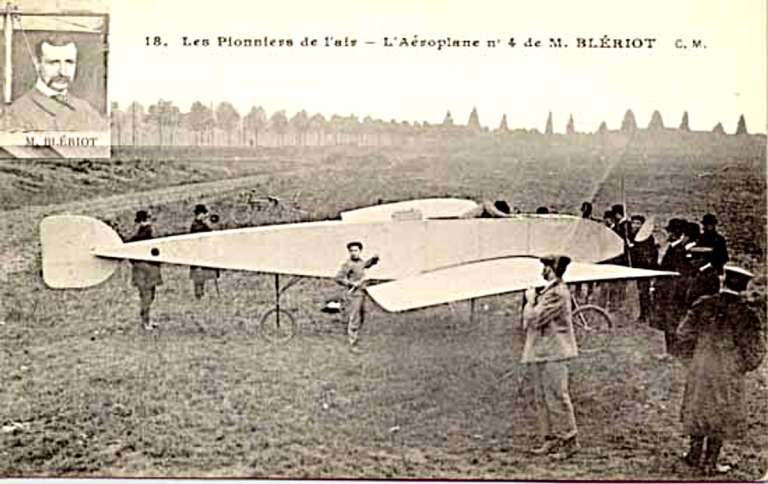

General information
- Type: Experimental aircraft
- Manufacturer: Louis Blériot
- Number built: 1

History
- First flight: 1907

The Blériot VII was an early French aeroplane built by Louis Blériot.

== Design and development ==
Following the success with the tandem wing configuration of the Blériot VI, he continued this line of development. The rear wing of his new design was about half the span of the forward wing, a step towards the configuration that would later be adopted as the basis for the vast majority of aircraft. The tail surfaces could be moved together, to act as elevators, or independently to act as ailerons: one of the first known examples of what would later become called elevons.

On 5 October Blériot began taxying trials at Issy-les-Moulineaux. The aircraft was difficult to control on the ground, and the tests ended when the undercarriage collapsed. Bleriot addressed this issue by redesigning the undercarriage, coming up with the arrangement that was used on nearly all of his subsequent aircraft designs. Each wheel was mounted on a castering trailing arm which was free to slide up and down along the round cross-section vertical members of a fixed, four-sided "bedstead" frame, the movement being sprung by bungee cords.

The aircraft was first flown on 16 November, when Blériot made a flight of around 500 m (1,600 ft), and further flights were made during November.

At the end of November further modifications were made: the wing was moved from its position immediately above the lower longerons to a position about two thirds of the way up the fuselage, and a tubular steel cabane structure was added to take the wing's bracing wires.

In this configuration the aircraft was flown by Blériot on 6 December. On this occasion he succeeded in making a U-turn in the air, and the performance of the aircraft was impressive enough for Patrick Alexander to write "I think Blériot is now leading the way".

However, the next flight trials, on 18 December, ended with a crash: the left wheel collapsed, causing the wing to dig in and the aircraft to turn over, resulting in its destruction. Blériot escaped without serious injury, his life possibly saved by the cabane structure, which acted as a roll bar.

== Specifications ==
Data from Opdycke 1990, p.49

General characteristics

- Crew: 1
- Length: 9 m (29 ft 6 in)
- Wingspan: 11 m (36 ft 1 in)
- Wing area: 25 m^{2} (270 sq ft)
- Gross weight: 425 kg (937 lb)
- Powerplant: 1 × Antoinette V-8 water-cooled piston engine, 37 kW (50 hp)
- Propellers: 2-bladed
