= Lucien Chauvière =

French aeronautical engineer

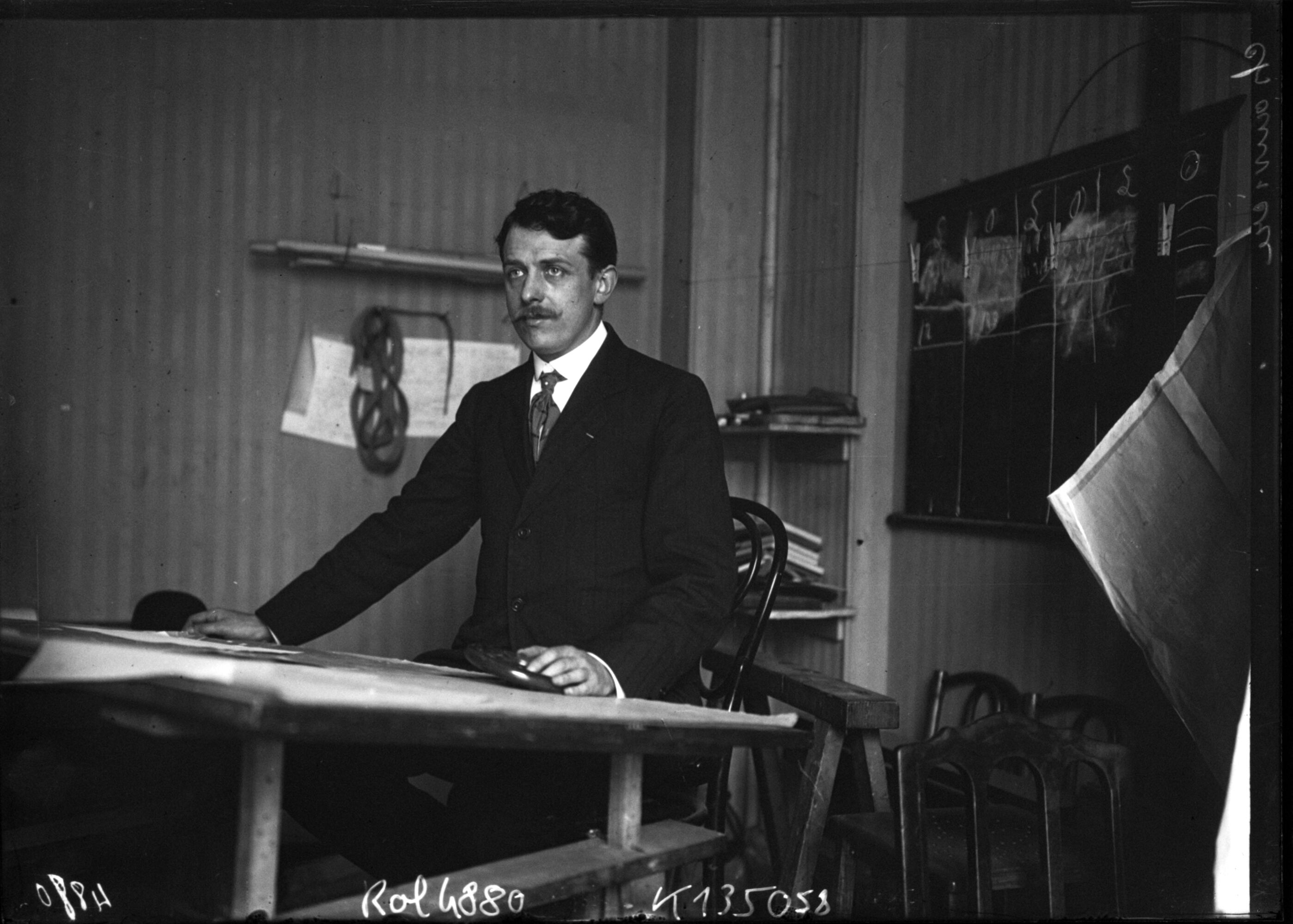
- Lucien Chauvière at his drawing board, 1909.
- Born: 1876; Paris
- Died: 1966 (aged 89–90)
- Education: École des Arts et Métiers, Angers
- Engineering career
- Discipline: aeronautics
- Significant design: Integrale laminated propeller
- Awards: Legion d'honneur

Lucien Chauvière (11 February 1876 – 7 April 1966) was a French aeronautical engineer. He is best known for his Integrale propellers, which were the first aerodynamically advanced propellers manufactured in Europe.

== Biography ==
Lucien Chauvière was born in Paris on 11 February 1876 and educated at Arts et Métiers ParisTech in Angers, where his studies included the theory of propeller design. He became a member of the Aero-Club de France in December 1906, sponsored by the engineer Andre Farcot. The same month he exhibited an apparatus designed to investigate the stability of helicopters at the Aero-Club's exhibit at the annual Salon d'Automobile.

In 1908, he made a 5 m (16 ft) diameter laminated wooden propeller for the Clément-Bayard No.1 semi-rigid airship, which broke the existing speed record for airships. He was also responsible for the construction of a number of heavier-than-air aircraft, some to his own design and some designed by others, including the Alfred de Pischoff biplane of 1907 and the Clement-Bayard monoplane of 1909 designed by Victor Tatin

He later established a factory at Quai Jules Guesde in the Vitry-sur-Seine suburb of Paris. A Chauvière propeller was fitted to the aircraft used by Louis Blériot to make the first heavier-than-air flight across the English Channel.

Following the success of his first propellers, Chauvière opened factories in France, Germany and Russia. Many of the pioneer aircraft constructors used his propellers, not simply because of their quality but also because they were available off the shelf from a large stock. Several hundred were made during 1910.

In 1913 he produced an experimental variable-pitch propeller, which was fitted to the Clement-Bayard VI airship.

Over 100,000 Chauvière propellers were built for Allied aircraft during the First World War, around 25% of total production.

After the war Chauvière carried out pioneering work in the construction of metal propellers, particularly the use of forged duralumin, and also worked on the development of variable-pitch propellers. A Chauvière metal propeller was fitted to the Blériot 110 monoplane flown by Lucien Bossoutrot and Maurice Rossi to break the world endurance record in March 1931.

== The Integrale ==
The success of Chauvière's propellers was due to both aerodynamic sophistication and careful construction. Previous wooden propellers had been carved from a single piece of timber. The Integrale introduced a new technique, constructing the propeller from a number of laminated planks. This had several advantages:

- The density of a length of wood can vary considerably along its length, the part coming from the lower part of the trunk tending to be denser. It is of great importance to balance a propeller about its axis of rotation: even a slight imbalance will result in potentially catastrophic vibration. Careful selection of the lengths of wood used eliminated this problem.
- Since the pieces of wood were thinner, less allowance had to be made for concealed flaws within the wood. This enabled the propellers to be up to 25% lighter.
- The layers of wood were assembled in a fanned arrangement. This partially established the form of the propeller, reducing the amount of carving necessary and also reducing the amount of waste.
