= Mercury =

Mercury most commonly refers to:

- Mercury (planet), the closest planet to the Sun
- Mercury (element), a chemical element
- Mercury (mythology), a Roman deity

Mercury or The Mercury may also refer to:

== Companies ==
- Mercury (toy manufacturer), a brand of diecast toy cars manufactured in Italy
- Mercury Communications, a British telecommunications firm set up in the 1980s
- Mercury Corporation, an American aircraft manufacturer
- Mercury Cyclecar Company, a defunct American car company
- Mercury Drug, a Philippine pharmacy chain
- Mercury Energy, an electricity generation and retail company in New Zealand
- Mercury Filmworks, a Canadian independent animation studio
- Mercury General, a multiple-line American insurance organization
- Mercury Interactive, a software testing tools vendor
- The Mercury Mall, a shopping centre in Romford, England
- Mercury Marine, a manufacturer of marine engines, particularly outboard motors
- Mercury Technologies, a financial technology company
- Mercury Truck & Tractor Company, a defunct English manufacturer of industrial vehicles
- Shenzhen Mercury Communication Technology Co., Ltd., a Chinese market subsidiary of TP-Link

== Computing ==
- Mercury (programming language), a functional logic programming language
- Mercury (metadata search system), a data search system for earth science research
- Ferranti Mercury, an early 1950s commercial computer
- Mercury Browser, a freeware mobile browser
- Mercury Mail Transport System, an email server

== Film and television ==
- Mercury (film), a 2018 Indian silent horror thriller by Karthik Subbaraj
- Mercury (TV series), an Australian television series
- Mercury Black, a character in the RWBY web series
- Sailor Mercury, a character in the Sailor Moon manga and anime franchise

== Literature ==
=== Comics ===
- Mercury (Marvel Comics), a character who can turn herself into a mercurial substance
- Makkari (character) or Mercury, an Eternal, a Marvel Comics race of superhumans
- Mercury, a member of the Metal Men, a DC Comics team
- Mercury, a member of Cerebro's X-Men
- Mercury, an Amalgam Comics character

=== Magazines ===
- Mercury (magazine), an astronomy magazine
- The American Mercury, originally a literary and later political magazine

=== Newspapers ===
- The Mercury (Hobart), Hobart, Tasmania, Australia
- The Mercury (South Africa), Durban, South Africa
- The Mercury (Pennsylvania), Pottstown, Pennsylvania
- The Mercury, former name of the now-defunct Reading Mercury, Reading, Berkshire, England
- The Mercury News, San Jose, California
- List of newspapers named Mercury, for newspapers with titles including the word "Mercury"

=== Novels ===
- Mercury (Bova novel), by Ben Bova
- Mercury (Livesey novel), by Margot Livesey
- Mercury, by Anna Kavan

== Music ==
=== Albums ===
- Mercury (American Music Club album) (1993)
- Mercury (Longview album) (2003)
- Mercury (Madder Mortem album) (1999)
- Mercury – Act 1 (2021), by Imagine Dragons
- Mercury – Acts 1 & 2 (2022), by Imagine Dragons

=== Songs ===
- "Mercury" (song), 2008, by Bloc Party
- "Mercury", by Counting Crows from Recovering the Satellites
- "Mercury", by Kathleen Edwards from Failer
- "Mercury", by Sufjan Stevens, Bryce Dessner, Nico Muhly and James McAlister from Planetarium
- "Mercury", by Steve Lacy from Gemini Rights

=== Other music ===
- Mercury Nashville, a record label
- Mercury Records, a record label
- Mercury Prize, an annual music prize awarded for the best album from the UK
- "Mercury, the Winged Messenger", a movement in Gustav Holst's The Planets

== Military ==
- Operation Mercury, codename for the German invasion of Crete during World War II
- Boeing E-6 Mercury, an American aircraft used as an airborne command post and communications relay
- Miles Mercury, a British aircraft designed during the Second World War
- HMS Mercury, various vessels or shore establishments of that name
- USS Mercury, seven vessels of that name
- Russian brig Mercury, an 1820 warship
- Mercury (pigeon), honored for bravery during World War II

== Places ==
=== United States ===
- Mercury, a place in Alabama
- Mercury, Nevada, a closed city within the Nevada Test Site
- Mercury, Texas, an unincorporated community

=== Elsewhere ===
- Mercury, Savoie, a commune in southeastern France
- Mercury Bay, New Zealand

== Plants ==
- Mercury (plant), members of the plant genus Mercurialis
- Annual mercury (Mercurialis annua), a species of flowering plant
- English mercury, or mercury goosefoot (Blitum bonus-henricus), a species of goosefoot

== Radio ==
- Mercury FM, a station in Surrey, UK
- Mercury 96.6 or Heart Hertfordshire, a station in Hertfordshire, UK

== Sports ==
- Edmonton Mercurys, a Canadian 1940s and 1950s intermediate ice hockey team
- Fujita Soccer Club Mercury, a Japanese women's football team active from 1989 to 1999
- Memphis Mercury, American women's soccer team
- Phoenix Mercury, a Women's National Basketball Association team from Arizona
- Toledo Mercurys, a defunct International Hockey League franchise from Ohio

== Theatres ==
- Mercury Cinema, in Adelaide, Australia
- Mercury Theatre (disambiguation), a list of Mercury theatres

== Vehicles ==
=== Air ===
- Blackburn Mercury, a British aircraft from 1911
- Bristol Mercury, a nine-cylinder aircraft engine

=== Land ===
- Mercury (automobile), a brand of automobiles produced by the Ford Motor Company from 1938 to 2011
- Mercury (cyclecar), an American cyclecar from 1914
- Mercury (train), a family of New York Central streamliner passenger trains (1936–1958)

=== Sea ===
- Mercury (ship), several ships of that name
- Cape Cod Mercury 15, an American sailboat design
- Mercury 18, an American sailboat design

=== Space ===
- Project Mercury, a US human spaceflight program, 1958–1963
- Mercury (satellite), a series of American spy satellites

== Other uses ==
- Mercury (name), including a list of people with the surname, given name or nickname
- Mercury Boulevard, in the cities of Hampton and Newport News, Virginia, US
- Mercury (cipher machine), a 1950s British cipher machine
- Archer Maclean's Mercury, a 2005 PlayStation Portable video game
- Shuttle America's callsign

== See also ==
- The American Mercury, an American magazine published from 1924 to 1981
- Mercure (disambiguation)
- Mercurey, a village in Burgundy, France
- Mercuri, a surname and list of people with the surname
- Mercurius (disambiguation)
- Mercury 1 (disambiguation)
- Mercury 2 (disambiguation)
- Mercury 3 (disambiguation)
- Mercury 4 (disambiguation)
- Mercury 5 (disambiguation)
- Mercury 6 (disambiguation)
- Mercury 7 (disambiguation)
- Mercury 8 (disambiguation)
- Mercury City (disambiguation)
- Mercury FM (disambiguation)
- Mercury House (disambiguation)
- Mercury mission (disambiguation)
- Mercury program (disambiguation)
- Mercury project (disambiguation)
