= Mercury (ship) =

Several vessels have been named for the Roman deity Mercury:

- Mercury (1772 ship) was launched on the Thames. In 1791 she made the first of two voyages as a whaler to Delagoa Bay. She was reported in February 1794 to have been lost off Mozambique while on her second voyage to the region.
- Mercury (1786 ship) apparently was launched in 1786 at Topsham, but her career prior to 1790 is obscure. She initially traded with Virginia and then with the "Straits". In 1794-1795 she made one voyage for the British East India Company (EIC). Upon her return she became a West Indiaman. She was lost in 1802.
- Mercury (1788 ship) was launched at Liverpool. She made 10 voyages as a slave ship before a privateer captured her on her 11th voyage.
- Mercury (1793 ship)
- Mercury (1806 ship) was launched at Calcutta. She may have made one voyage for the EIC in 1806–1807. She was also one of the vessels in Stamford Raffles's expedition in 1819 to occupy Singapore. She was sold in 1822.
- Mein Schiff Herz (formerly MV Mercury, Celebrity Mercury and Mein Schiff 2) was launched in 1997.

== See also ==
- HMS Mercury – any one of 17 vessels or shore establishments of that name
- HCS Mercury (1806) was a 14-gun brig launched at Bombay Dockyard in 1806 for the naval arm of the British East India Company and lost at sea in 1833.
- Russian brig Mercury
- USS Mercury – any one of seven vessels of that name
