= Merkury =

Merkury, Merkuriy,Merkuriy (Russian: Меркурий, Mercury) may refer to:

== Given name ==
- Merkurii Giliarov or Mercury Ghilarov (1912–1985), Soviet soil scientist
- Merkuriy Ivanov (born 1964), Russian Orthodox metropolitan bishop
- Merkury Vagin (died 1712), Russian explorer

== Other ==
- Russian ship Merkury, multiple ships
- Merkuriy, Kursk Oblast, a settlement in Russia

== See also ==
ru:Меркурий (значения)
