= Mercure =

Mercure may refer to:

- MERCURE, an atmospheric dispersion modelling CFD code developed by Électricité de France
- Mercure Hotels, a chain of hotels run by Accor
- French ship Mercure (1783)
- Dassault Mercure, a French airliner built in the 1970s
- HMS Mercure (1798), a French privateer captured and put into service by the British
- Mercure (ballet), of 1924 with music by Erik Satie
- Mercure (novel), by Belgian writer Amélie Nothomb first published in 1998
- R v Mercure, a decision of the Supreme Court of Canada
- Mercure de France, a French gazette and literary magazine first published in the 17th century

== See also ==
- Mercur (disambiguation)
- Mercury (disambiguation)
- Merkur (disambiguation)
