= Mercury 1 =

Mercury 1 or variants may refer to:

- Mercury 1, a spacecraft of Project Mercury
- Mercury(I), an oxidation state of the element Mercury
- Mercury One, a non-profit organization founded by Glenn Beck
- Mercury I, a version of the Blackburn Mercury early British aircraft
- Mercury I, a 1926 version of the Bristol Mercury aircraft engine

== See also ==
- Mercury (disambiguation)
- Mercury-Redstone 1, a 1960 space flight test
  - Mercury-Redstone 1A
- Mercury-Atlas 1, a 1960 space flight test
- Mercury-Scout 1, a 1961 spacecraft
