= Mercury 2 =

Mercury 2 or variants may refer to:

- Mercury 2, a spacecraft of Project Mercury
- Mercury(II), an oxidation state of the element Mercury
- Mercury II, a version of the Blackburn Mercury early British aircraft
- Mercury II, a 1928 version of the Bristol Mercury aircraft engine
- The Mercury II, a crashed spaceship in the game Subnautica: Below Zero.

== See also ==
- Mercury (disambiguation)
- Mercury-Redstone 2, a 1961 space flight test
- Mercury-Atlas 2, a 1962 space flight test
