= Mercury 3 =

Mercury 3 or variants may refer to:

- Mercury-Redstone 3, a spacecraft of Project Mercury
- Mercury(III), an unknown compound of the element Mercury
- Mercury III, a version of the Blackburn Mercury early British aircraft
- Mercury III, a 1929 version of the Bristol Mercury aircraft engine

== See also ==
- Mercury (disambiguation)
- Mercury-Redstone 3, the first U.S. human spaceflight, 1961
- Mercury-Atlas 3, a 1961 unmanned space flight
