= Mercur =

Mercur may refer to:

== Places ==
- Gangsås, an area in the city of Harstad, Norway (also known as Mercur)
- Mercur, Utah, a ghost town in Tooele County, Utah, USA

== Other uses ==
- Magirus Mercur, a German 5-ton truck that was built by Magirus Deutz in Germany from 1951 to 1972
- Mercur, a 2017 Danish TV series released as Something's Rockin', starring Charlotte Fich
- Radio Mercur, a former Danish offshore broadcasting commercial radio station
- Songa Mercur, a semi-submersible drilling rig designed by Friede & Goldman
- Ulysses Mercur, a Republican member of the U.S. House of Representatives from Pennsylvania and Chief Justice of the Supreme Court of Pennsylvania

== See also ==
- Merkur (disambiguation)
- Mercury (disambiguation)
