= Russian ship Merkury =

Merkury, Merkuriy, Merkuriy (Russian: Меркурий, Mercury) may refer to:

- Russian brig Merkurii (1820–1857)
- Russian corvette Merkury (commissioned in 2021)

See more of them in :ru:Меркурий (значения) § Корабли.
