= Brig "Mercury" Attacked by Two Turkish Ships =

1892 painting by Ivan Aivazovsky

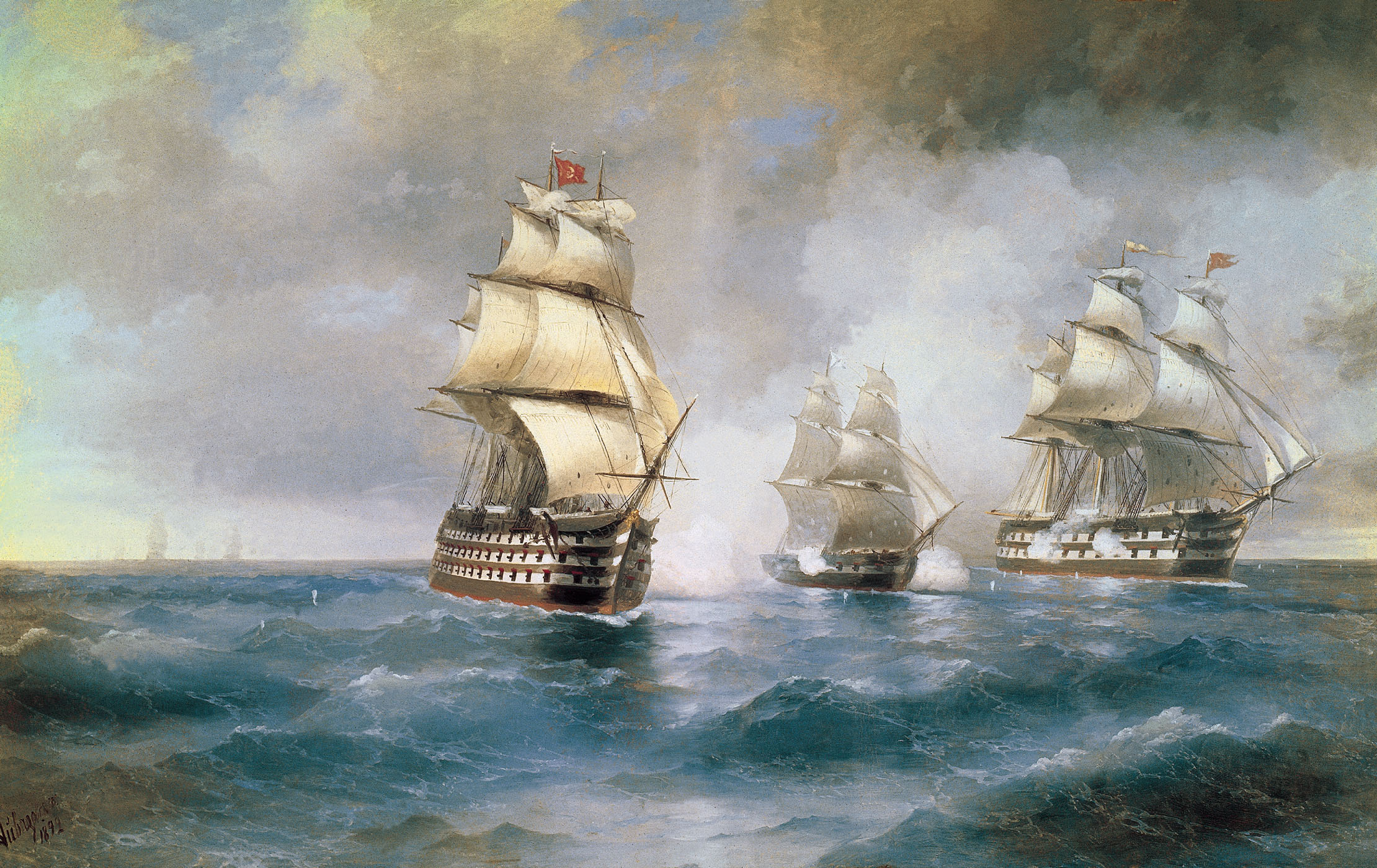
- Artist: Ivan Aivazovsky
- Year: 1892
- Medium: Oil-on-canvas
- Dimensions: 212 cm × 339 cm (83 in × 133 in)
- Location: Theodosia Art Gallery, Crimea

Brig "Mercury" Attacked by Two Turkish Ships (Russian: Бриг "Меркурий", атакованный двумя турецкими кораблями) is an 1892 oil on canvas painting by Russian painter Ivan Aivazovsky (1817–1900). Aivazovsky painted over 6,000 works, more than half of which are seascapes.

It depicts three ships in close combat on a rough sea; as the name suggests, the battle occurs between two Turkish warships, and another ship referred to in the painting's title as the Mercury. While Aivazovsky painted many seascapes, often involving ships and boats of various descriptions, and many showing ships that were damaged or shipwrecked, few of his works featured ships in close naval combat.

== Historical background ==
The battle portrayed was part of the Russo-Turkish War of 1828–1829, a war sparked by the Greeks' struggle for independence and ensuing events. The Turkish sultan became hostile to the Russians due their participation in the Battle of Navarino and, as a result, proceeded to close the Dardanelles for Russian ships and revoked the 1826 Convention of Akkerman.

=== Mercury ===
Mercury was a real ship (a 20-gun brig) that was laid down at Sevastopol on 28 January 1819, and designed as a patrol ship to guard the Northern Caucasus coast. Built of Crimean oak, with a shallow draught and equipped with oars,^{[a]} Mercury was launched on 7 May 1820 and disassembled on 9 November 1857. In this it differs from other brigs of the Imperial Russian Navy at the time; other brigs were not built this way because a shallow draught limited and lowered the maximum speed considerably. Oars were also seen as disadvantageous. This difference resulted from the fact that its original task was considered unique among its designers.

Mercury fought in several significant naval battles during its existence. One of the most notable of these battles involved a battle between Mercury (which was, at the time, commanded by Lieutenant Alexander Kazarsky) and two other brigs against a sizable complement of approximately 14 Turkish ships, who were returning from the shores of Anatolia. Turkish victory was at first foreseeable, but the tides of battle changed, and Mercury was able to escape after a final, powerful assault by the three brigs, ending the conflict.

After the conflict had ended, one of the navigators of the Turkish ships made a comment commending Mercury for her seaworthiness, and the captain for his bravery:

If in the great deeds of ancient or our times there are the feats of bravery, so this act put the others in the shade and the name of a hero should be wrote [sic] by the gold letter in the shrine of glory: the captain was Kazarsky, and the name of this brig was "Mercury".
