= Songa Offshore =

European offshore drilling contractor

Songa Offshore SE
- Type: Societas Europaea
- Industry: Offshore services
- Founded: Oslo, Norway (2005)
- Headquarters: Limassol, Cyprus
- Key people: Bjørnar Iversen (CEO)
- Services: Offshore drilling
- Revenue: 420,000,000 US dollar (2019)
- Operating income: 87,505,000 US dollar (2019)
- Net income: 34,450,000 US dollar (2019)
- Owner: Antonis Sfakianakis (54,35%)
- Number of employees: 350 ±150
- Parent: Transocean
- Website: www.deepwater.com

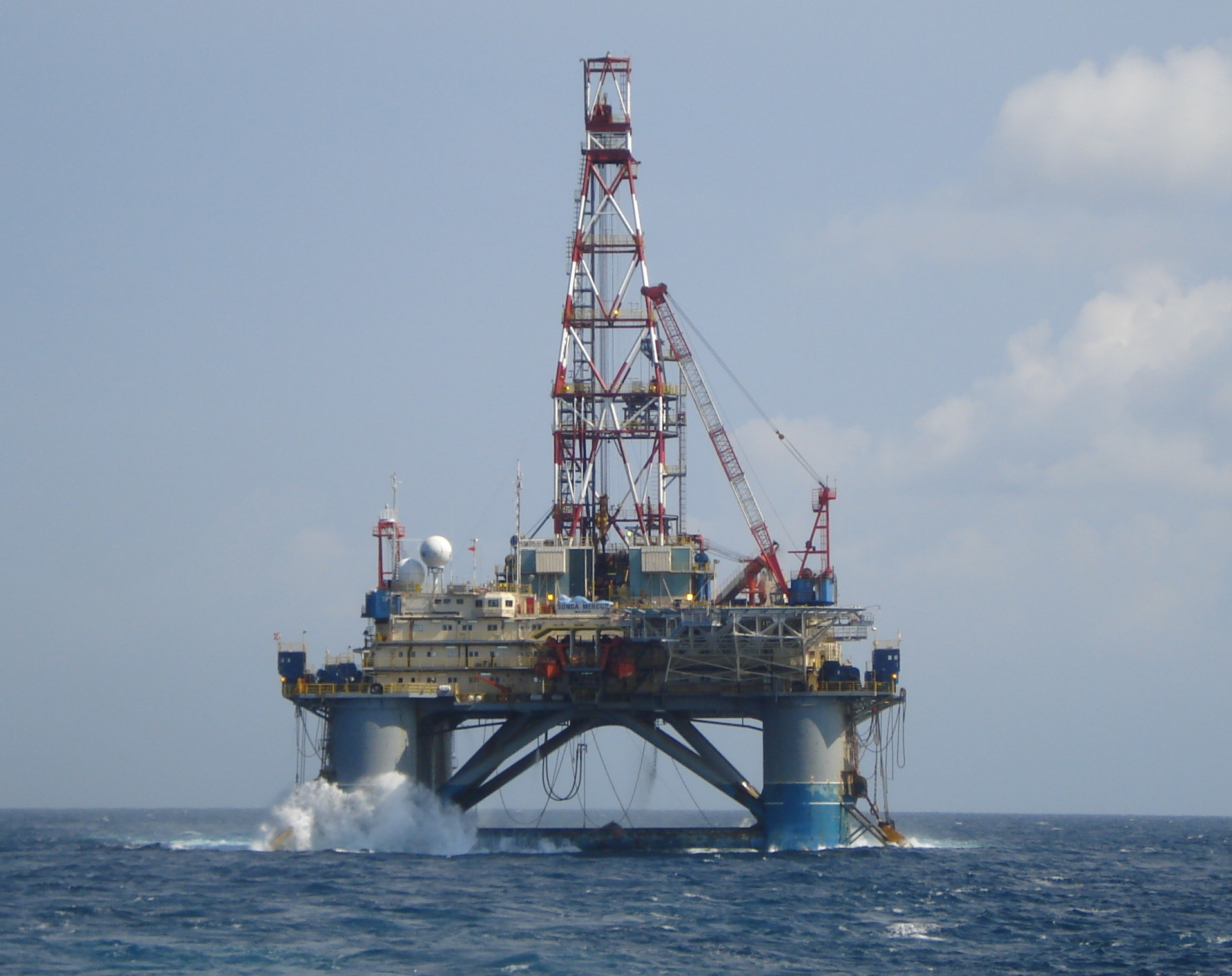
Songa Mercur

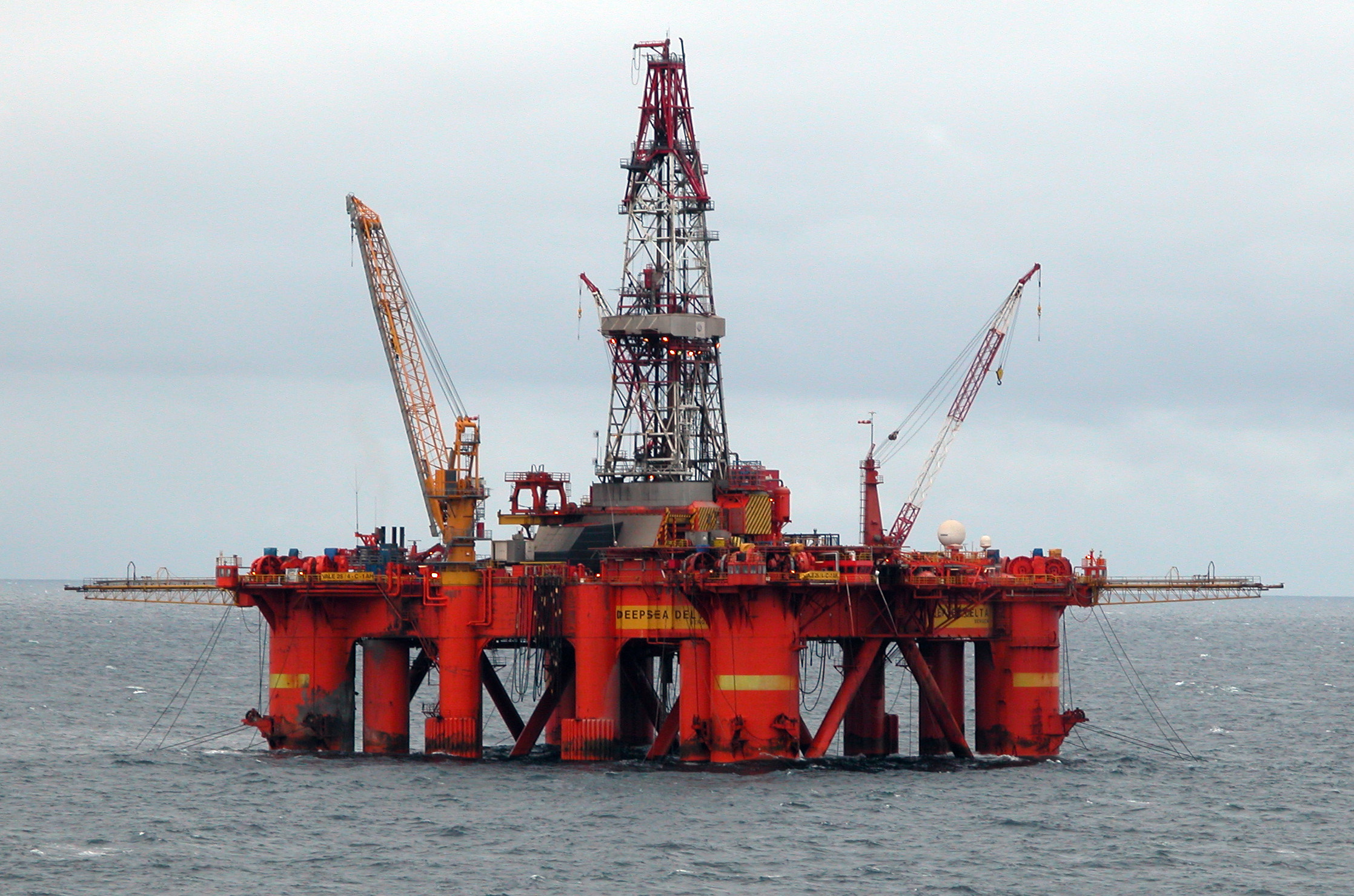
Songa Delta as Deepsea Delta in 2006

Songa Offshore SE is a European offshore drilling contractor founded in 2005 with offices in Cyprus, Stavanger, Oslo, Houston, Kuala Lumpur, Aberdeen, and Singapore.

== History ==
Songa Offshore AS was founded in January 2005 with the purchase of the two semisubmersibles, Mata Redonda and La Muralla. Mata Redonda was renamed Songa Venus and La Muralla was renamed Songa Mercur.

Songa Offshore was listed on the Oslo Stock Exchange 26 January 2006. In May 2009 Songa Offshore SE was redomiciled to Cyprus, and it is registered in Limassol, Cyprus.

Songa Offshore bought the Songa Dee from Stena Offshore in June 2006. After that Songa Trym (2006) and Songa Delta (2008) was bought from Odfjell Drilling.

Before Transoceans acquisition, Songa Offshore SE were the largest semi submersible drilling contractor on the Norwegian Continental Shelf (NCS) with seven drilling units in operation, after the delivery of the four new Category D Rigs delivered in 2015 From the DSME yard in Korea.

In 2013 the company changed out the management of the company and Mr. Bjørnar Iversen became CEO of the company and the company went true a significant restructuring where Mr. Frederik Wilhelm Mohn became the majority shareholder. The restructuring of Songa Offshore SE was elected by Marine Money Conference to be the offshore restructuring deal of the year 2013, world wide.

The company changed the strategy in 2013 to focus on the harsh environment North Atlantic mid-water market and sold the South East Asia rigs, Songa Mercur and Songa Venus, to Opus Offshore in July 2014.

The company is a leading player in the North Atlantic drilling market.

== Transocean Acquisition ==
On August 15, 2017, Transocean announced it was acquiring Songa Offshore for US$1.2 billion in cash, and an enterprise value of approximately US$3.4 billion. The complete transfer of business to Transocean was done by January 30, 2018.

== Operations ==
Songa Offshore operates seven semi-submersibles oil rigs.

- Songa Dee
- Songa Delta
- Songa Trym
- Songa Equinox (Cat D-1)
- Songa Endurance (Cat D-2)
- Songa Encourage (Cat D-3)
- Songa Enabler (Cat D-4)

In 2014, Songa Offshore sold Songa Venus and Songa Mercur rigs to Opus Offshore as a part of the deal creating Songa-Opus joint venture Songa Opus Offshore Drilling Pte Ltd (SOOD) that incorporates Songa's international operations. Ordered Cat D rigs were delivered in 2015. All of them, being built by Daewoo Shipbuilding & Marine Engineering, will are chartered by Statoil. These rigs are designed to drill at mature oil fields off Norway.
