= Mercury project =

Mercury project may refer to:

- Project Mercury, the first human spaceflight program of the U.S., 1958–1963
- Project Mercury (album), by Rosetta and Balboa, 2007
- Mercury (satellite), a series of three U.S. spy satellites launched in the 1990s
- Game Gear console, developed as Project Mercury
- Rocket's Red Glare, a 2000 TV movie originally titled Mercury Project
- Project Mercury, a prototype of Linksys iPhone

== See also ==
- Mercury program (disambiguation)
- Mercury (disambiguation)
