= Mercury 4 =

Mercury 4 or variants may refer to:

- Mercury 4, a spacecraft of Project Mercury
- Mercury4, an Australian boy band 2000–2004
- Mercury(IV), an unknown compound of the element Mercury
- Mercury IV, a 1929 version of the Bristol Mercury aircraft engine

== See also ==
- Mercury (disambiguation)
- Mercury-Redstone 4, the second U.S. human spaceflight, 1961
- Mercury-Atlas 4, a 1961 unmanned space flight
