= Mercury (Livesey novel) =

2016 novel by Margot Livesey

- First edition
- Author: Margot Livesey
- Language: English
- Publisher: HarperCollins
- Publication date: 2016
- Publication place: United Kingdom

Mercury is a 2016 novel by Scottish author Margot Livesey. It concerns a 40-something couple, Donald and Viv, whose marriage suffers due to their dissatisfaction with their lives.
