= Merkur (disambiguation) =

Merkur (German for Mercury) is an automobile brand.

Merkur may also refer to:

== Companies and organizations ==
- Merkur AG, originally a Swiss company selling coffee and chocolate, now known as the retail conglomerate Valora Holding AG
- Merkur Department Store, a former department store in early 20th century Stuttgart, Germany
- HanseMerkur, an insurance company under the umbrella of Gothaer Group based in Cologne, Germany
- Merkur, a supermarket chain in Austria owned by REWE Group, merged with Billa in April 2021
- The Westin Leipzig in Leipzig, formerly known as Hotel Merkur

== Publications ==
- Merkur (magazine), a German intellectual magazine
- Rheinischer Merkur, a nationwide German weekly newspaper
- Münchner Merkur, a newspaper of Munich
- Der teutsche Merkur, an influential German literary review founded in 1773 by Christoph Martin Wieland

== Vehicles and transportation ==
- Merkur (train), an express train in Europe
- Merkur spacecraft, the name given in the West to the VA spacecraft
- MV Merkur (1924), a passenger cargo vessel

== Other uses ==
- Merkur (toy), a metal construction set built in Czechoslovakia
- Operation Merkur, a German airborne attack during the Battle of Crete in World War II
- Merkur (mountain), in the Black Forest near Baden-Baden, Germany
- RD Merkur, a team handball club from Škofja Loka, Slovenia
- Merkur Spiel-Arena, a stadium in Düsseldorf, Germany
- Clinical Hospital Merkur, a hospital in Zagreb, Croatia

== See also ==
- Mercur (disambiguation)
- Mercury (disambiguation)
