= Mercury 7 (disambiguation) =

The Mercury 7 were the seven original American astronauts.

Mercury 7 may also refer to:

- Mercury 7, a spacecraft of Project Mercury
- Mercury VII, a version of the Bristol Mercury aircraft engine

== See also ==
- Mercury (disambiguation)
- Mercury-Atlas 7, a 1962 space flight
