= Mercurius (disambiguation) =

Mercurius is Latin for Mercury, a Roman god.

Mercurius may also refer to:

== Mythology and fiction ==
- Mercurius, the demon from the German fairy tale "The Spirit in the Bottle"
- The OZ-13MSX2 Mercurius, a mobile suit appearing in the anime Mobile Suit Gundam Wing

== People ==
- Saint Mercurius (224/225–250 AD), Christian saint and a martyr
- Pope John II (died 535), whose given name was Mercurius
- Mercurius Oxoniensis (1914–2003), pen-name of the British historian Hugh Trevor-Roper
- Mercurius of Transylvania, voivode of Transylvania
- Mercurius of Slavonia, ban of Slavonia
- Mercurius of Macuria, king of Nubia

== Other uses ==
- Mercurius (crater), a crater on the Moon
- Mercurius (trade union), a former Dutch trade union
- PS Mercurius, a ship
- Mercurius (Sweden), a Swedish Investment company that part bought Coloroll

== See also ==
- Mercury (disambiguation) (Latin: Mercurius)
- Meconium, the earliest stool of a mammalian infant
