= Mercury mission =

Mercury mission may refer to:

- Exploration of Mercury, a mission to the planet Mercury
- Project Mercury, a mission of the NASA Mercury program

== See also ==
- Mission to Mercury, 1965 novel
- Mercury (disambiguation)
