= Mercurio =

Mercurio may refer to:

== People ==
- Angelo Mercurio (1936–2006), Italian-American mobster
- Carla Mercurio (born 1960), Italian former sprinter
- Fabio Mercurio (born 1966), Italian mathematician
- François Mercurio (1930–2010), French footballer
- Giovanni Andrea Mercurio (1518–1561), Italian Roman Catholic bishop and cardinal
- Gus Mercurio (1928–2010), American-born Australian actor, boxing referee and judge, and sports commentator
- Jed Mercurio (born 1966), British writer
- Paul Mercurio (born 1963), Australian actor and dancer
- Steven Mercurio (born 1956), American composer and conductor
- Mercurio Baiardo (fl. 1555–1574), Italian painter
- Mercurio Bua (1478–c. 1542), Albanian condottiero (mercenary leader)
- Mercurio (wrestler), the ring name of Mexican professional wrestler Abraham Arrieta González

== El Mercurio ==
- El Mercurio, a Chilean newspaper
- El Mercurio de Valparaíso, another Chilean newspaper
- El Mercurio (Ecuador), an Ecuadorian newspaper

== Other ==
- Mercurio the 4-D Man, a fictional character that appears in the Marvel Universe
- Mercurio (album), of 2013 by Italian rapper Emis Killa
- "Mercurio", a song by Karol G from Mañana Será Bonito, 2023

== See also ==
- Mercury (disambiguation)
