= Mercury 8 =

Mercury 8 or variants may refer to:

- Mercury Eight, a Ford motor car 1939–1951
- Mercury 8, a spacecraft of Project Mercury
- Mercury VIII, a 1935 version of the Bristol Mercury aircraft engine

== See also ==
- Mercury (disambiguation)
- Mercury-Atlas 8, a 1962 crewed space flight
- Mercury V8, an automobile
