= Aivazovsky National Art Gallery =

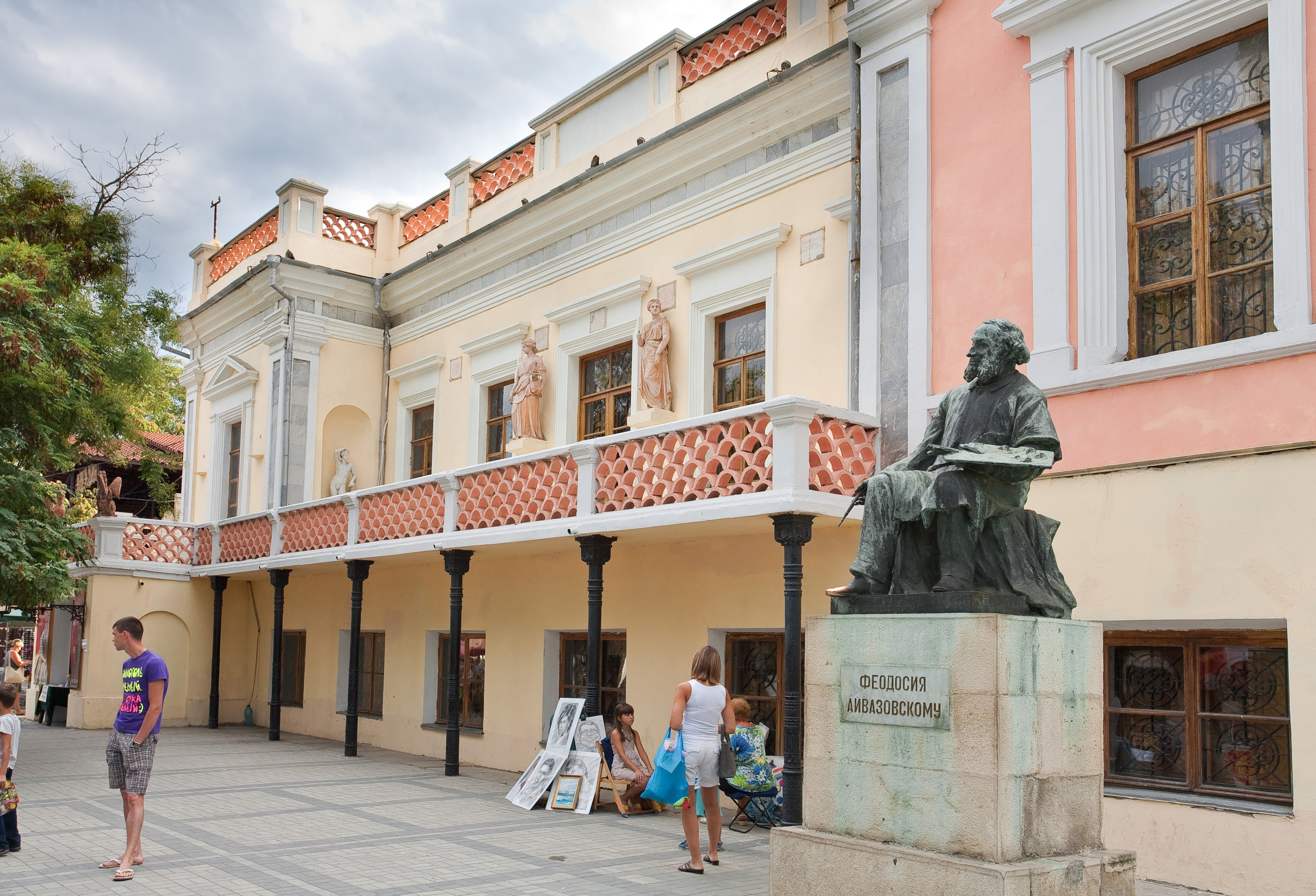

- Location in Crimea
- Established: 1845
- Location: Feodosia
- Coordinates: 45.032175°N 35.382736°E
- Type: national art museum

Immovable Monument of National Significance of Ukraine
- Official name: Будинок, у якому жив художник І. К. Айвазовський (House where the artist I. K. Aivazovsky lived)
- Type: History
- Reference no.: 010030-Н

The Aivazovsky National Art Gallery (Note: Ukrainian: Феодосійська національна картинна галерея, romanized: Feodosiyska natsionalna kartynna halereia; Crimean Tatar: Kefedeki milliy resimler galereyası; Russian: Феодосийская картинная галерея имени И.К.Айвазовского, romanized: Feodosiyskaya kartinnaya galereya imeni I. K. Ayvazovskogo) is a national art museum in Feodosia, Crimea, one of the oldest art museums in Ukraine. The first exhibition was privately organised by Ivan Aivazovsky's in his house in 1845. The basis collection included his 49 paintings. In 1880 an additional exhibition hall was attached to the house. The gallery became the third museum in the Russian Empire, after the Hermitage Museum and the Tretyakov Gallery. After Aivazovsky's death in 1900, the ownership of the gallery was transferred to the city according to his testament.

Towards the end of 1920, the house was occupied by the Feodosia department of Cheka. Several paintings were damaged at that time.

Since 1922, the gallery became a state museum in the USSR. The collection consists of about 12 thousand nautical theme works, including the world's largest collection of works by Ivan Aivazovsky himself (417 paintings). The gallery exposition introduces the works of Aivazovsky, his family history, and the history of the gallery. A separate building (artist's sister house) presents mythological and biblical paintings, foreign marine paintings of the 18th-19th centuries, and the Cimmerian school of painting including Isaac Levitan, Maximilian Voloshin, Lev Lagorio, Konstantin Bogaevsky, Mikhail Lattry, Adolf Faessler, and Arkhip Kuindzhi.

In 1930 a monument to Aivazovsky, by Ilya Ginzburg, with the inscription "Feodosia to Aivazovsky" was erected in front of the main building.

== Gallery ==
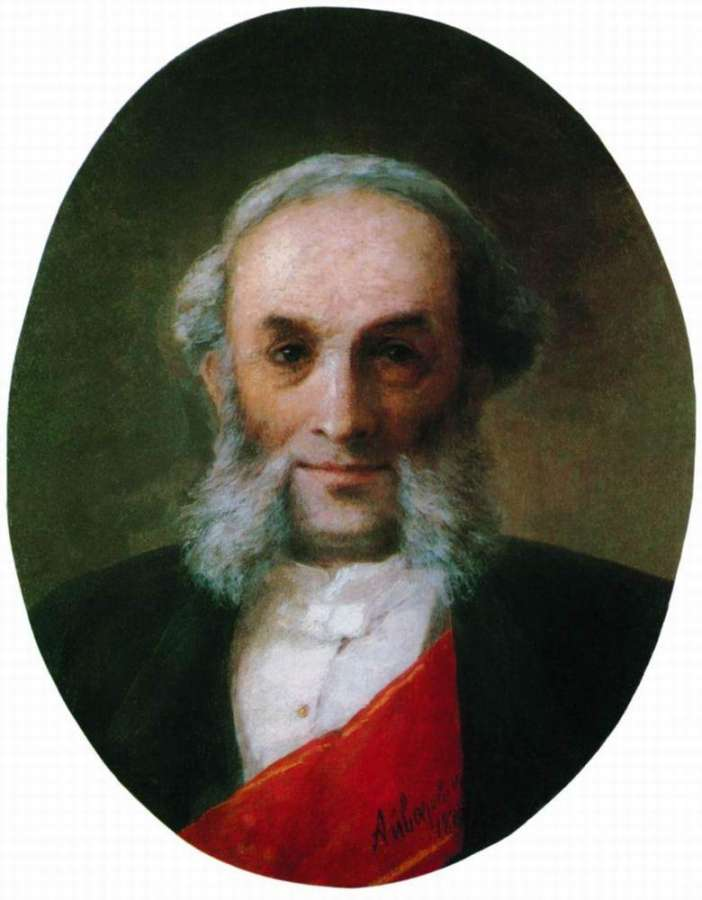
Aivazovsky self-portrait, 1881

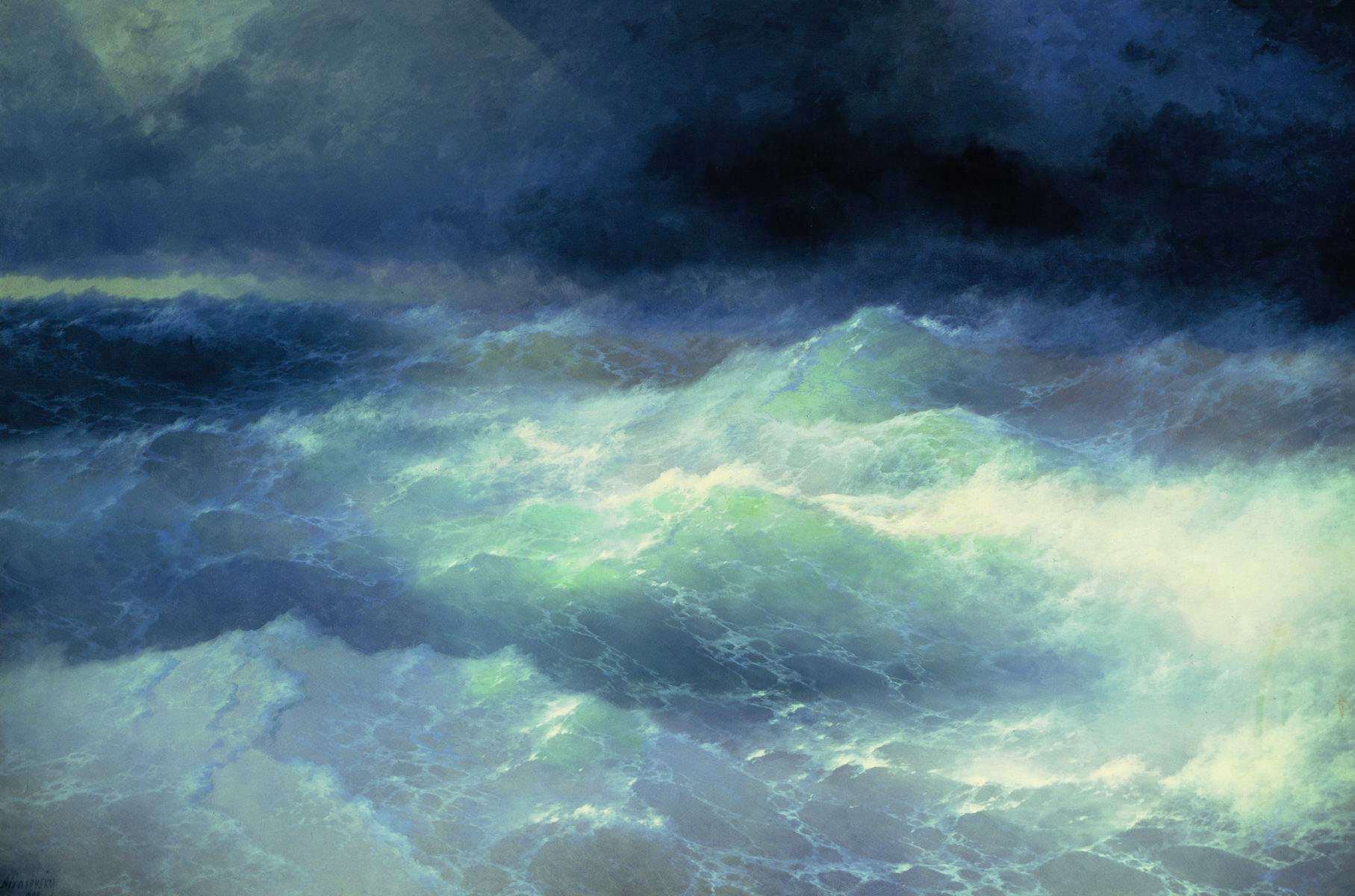
Among the Waves, 1898

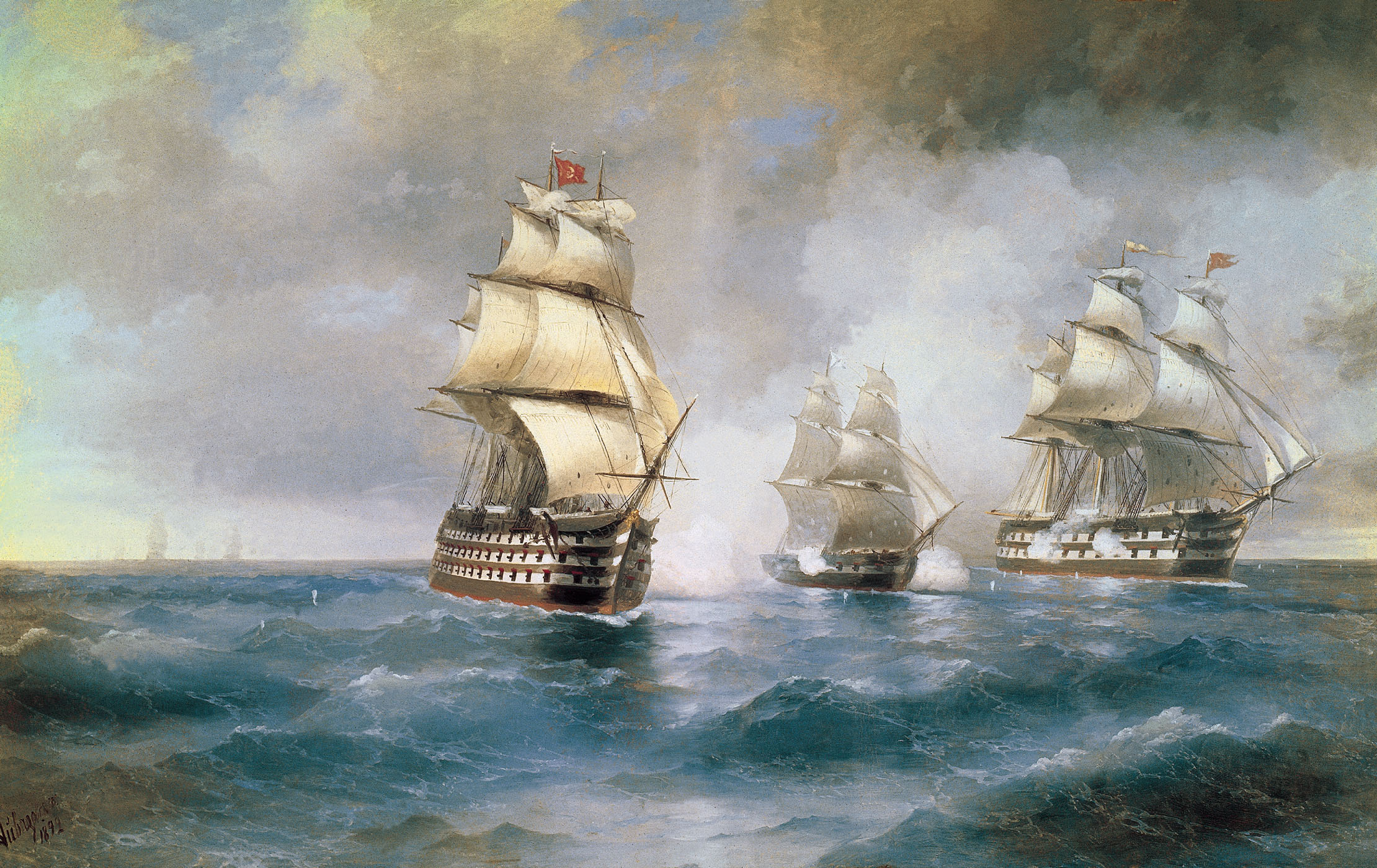
Brig "Mercury" Attacked by Two Turkish Ships, 1892

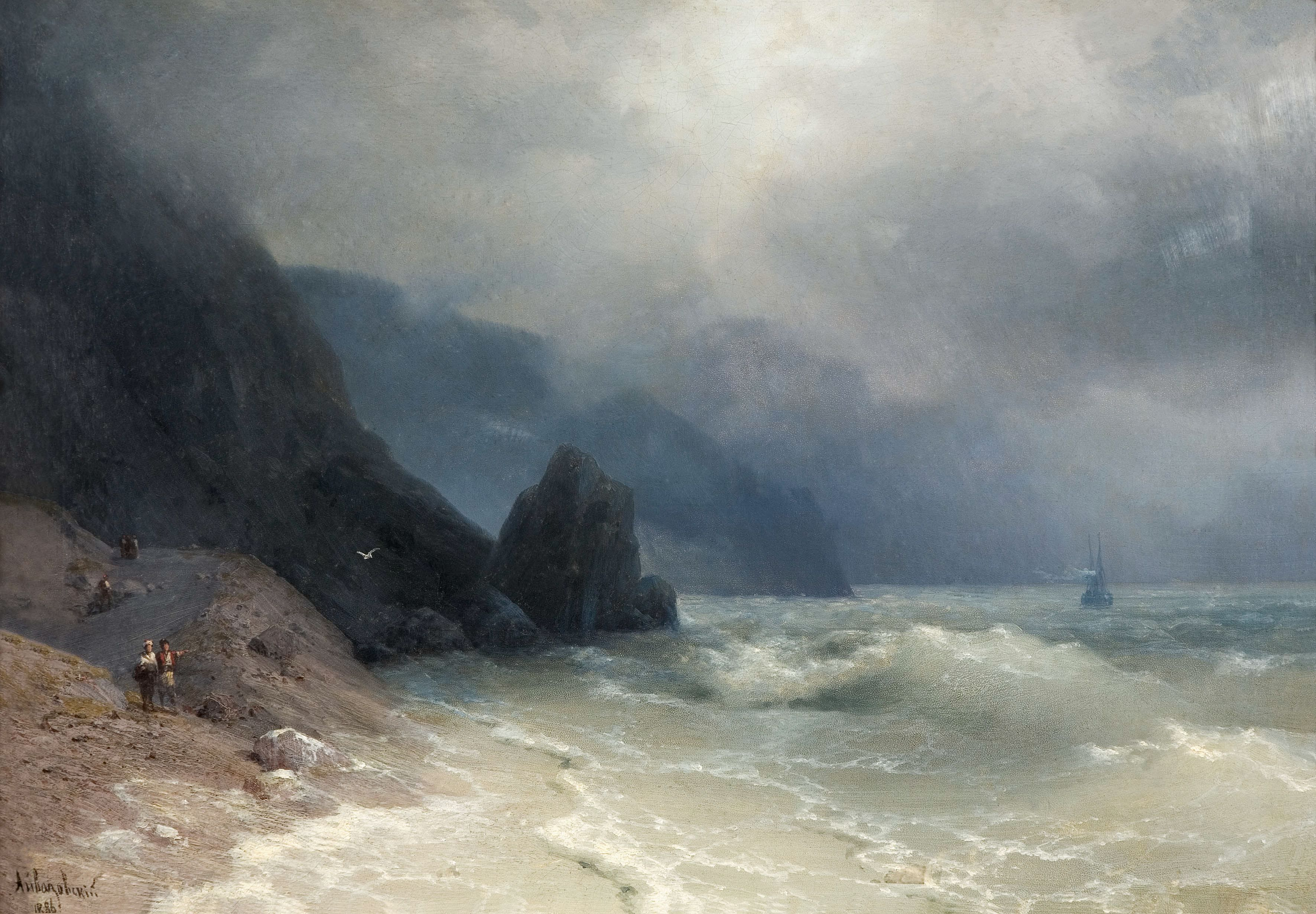
Sea coast, 1868

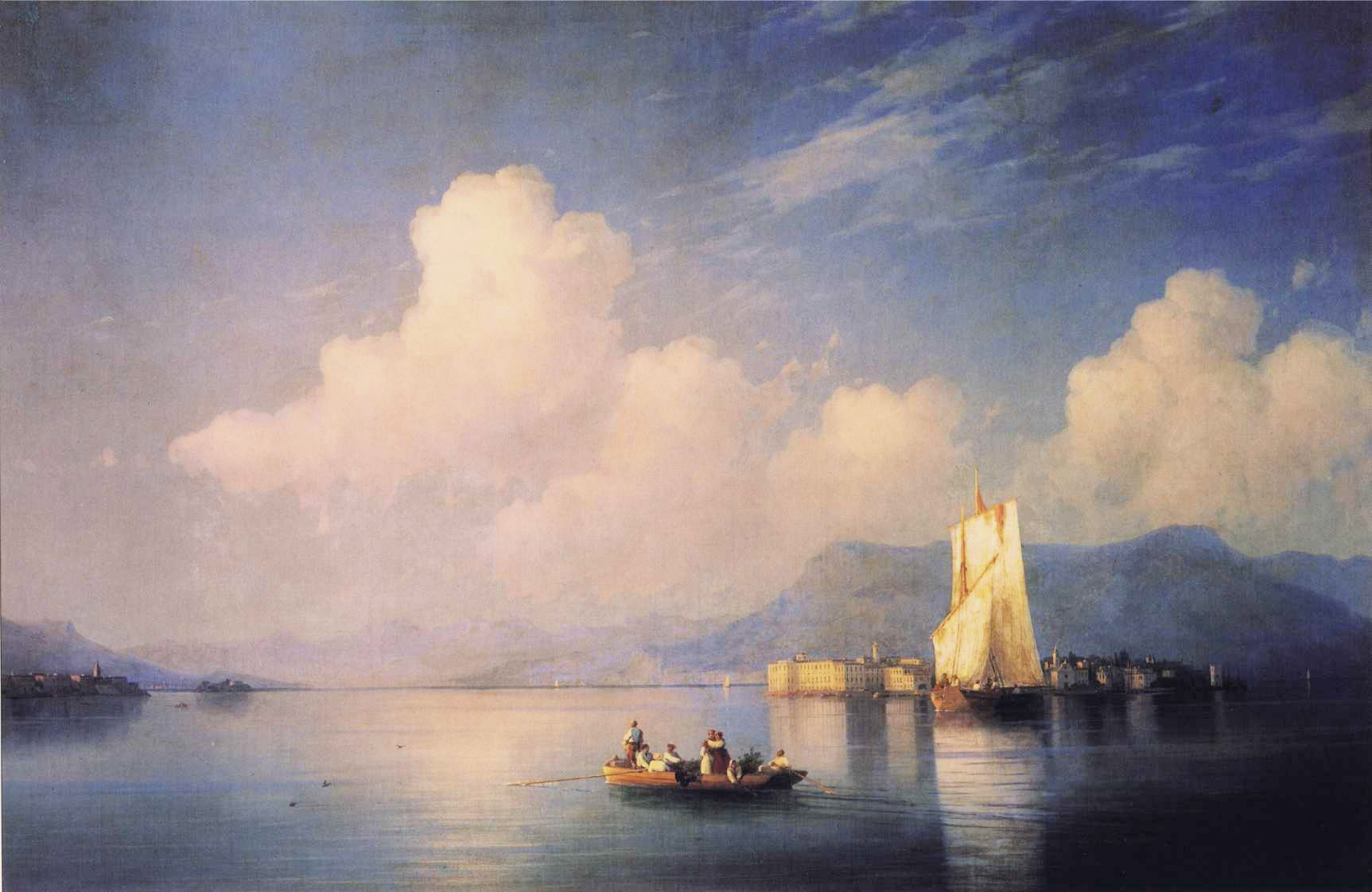
Italian Landscape Lago Maggiore in the Evening, 1858

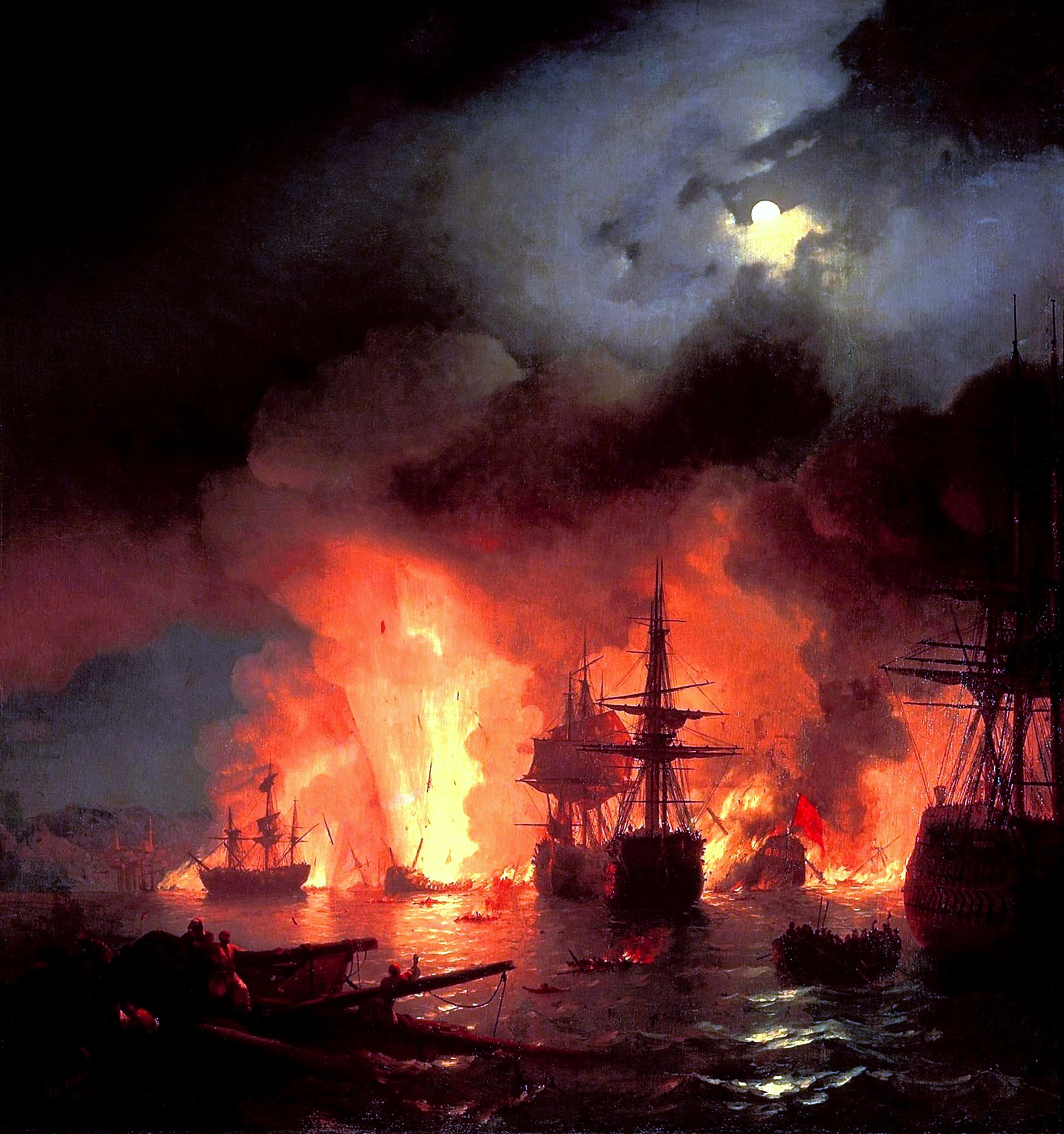
Battle of Çesme at Night, 1848

== See also ==
- List of single-artist museums

== Notes and references ==
- С. Р. Гриневецкий, И. С. Зонн, С. С. Жильцов. Черноморская энциклопедия. — М.: Международные отношения, 2006. — 35 c. — ISBN 5-7133-1273-9 (in Russian).
- Феодосия: краткий путеводитель. Редакторы А. В. Меснянко, Ю. С. Воронцова. — Севастополь: Библекс, 2007. — 96 с. — ISBN 978-966-8231-93-3 (in Russian).
- Aivazovsky National Art Gallery. The guide. Simferopol, 1971.
