= List of newspapers named Mercury =

Mercury or The Mercury is the name of the following newspapers:

== Australia ==
- Illawarra Mercury, a daily newspaper
- Maitland Mercury
- St Arnaud Mercury, Victoria
- The Mercury (Hobart)

== Canada ==
- Guelph Mercury, Guelph, Ontario
- Quebec Mercury, a defunct 19th century weekly newspaper published in Quebec City, Quebec

== South Africa ==
- The Mercury (South Africa), an English language newspaper published in Durban, South Africa

== United Kingdom ==
- Clevedon Mercury, a free weekly newspaper
- Leicester Mercury, a regional newspaper
- London Mercury, a list of periodicals published in London
- Matlock Mercury
- Reading Mercury, a defunct newspaper which was published in Berkshire, England
- Stamford Mercury, a weekly paid-for newspaper, the oldest continuous newspaper title in England
- The Mercury, for many years the Saturday edition of The Scarborough News
- Sherborne Mercury, a defunct newspaper
- Staffordshire Mercury, which was published in Staffordshire, England
- The Somerset Mercury, a regional newspaper in Somerset, England
- Sunday Mercury, a newspaper in Birmingham, England
- The Weston & Somerset Mercury, a weekly paid for newspaper in Somerset, England

== United States ==
- The Mercury (Pennsylvania), a daily newspaper published in Pottstown
- The Manhattan Mercury, a local afternoon newspaper in Kansas
- Mercury (Newport), Rhode Island
- Newport Mercury, a defunct Rhode Island newspaper
- Pittsburgh Mercury, a 19th-century newspaper in Pittsburgh, Pennsylvania
- Portland Mercury, an alternative weekly newspaper published in Oregon
- San Jose Mercury, now The Mercury News, a daily newspaper published in San Jose, California

== See also ==
- Mercurio (disambiguation), which includes newspapers named El Mercurio
