= Mercuri =

Mercuri is a surname. Notable people with the surname include:

- Alessandro Mercuri (born 1973), French-Italian author and director
- Federico Mercuri (born 1992), Italian EDM producer and DJ, half of Merk & Kremont
- Mark Mercuri (born 1974), retired Australian rules football player
- Osvaldo Mércuri (1944/1945–2021), Argentine politician
- Paolo Mercuri (1804–1884), Italian engraver and illustrator
- Rebecca Mercuri, computer scientist specializing in computer security and computer forensics
- Rob Mercuri (born c. 1982), American politician
- Daniela Mercury (born 1965), Brazilian singer

== See also ==
- Mercuri method, modification to DRE voting machine used to verify the count of votes
- Mercury (disambiguation)
