= Mercury program (disambiguation) =

The Mercury program was Project Mercury, the first successful American crewed spaceflight program, 1958–63.

Mercury Program may also refer to:

- The Mercury Program, an American post-rock band formed 1997

== Other uses ==
- The Mercury Theatre on the Air, radio program
- Mercury (TV series), TV program

== See also ==
- Mercury project (disambiguation)
- Mercury (disambiguation)
