= Margot Livesey =

Scottish-born writer

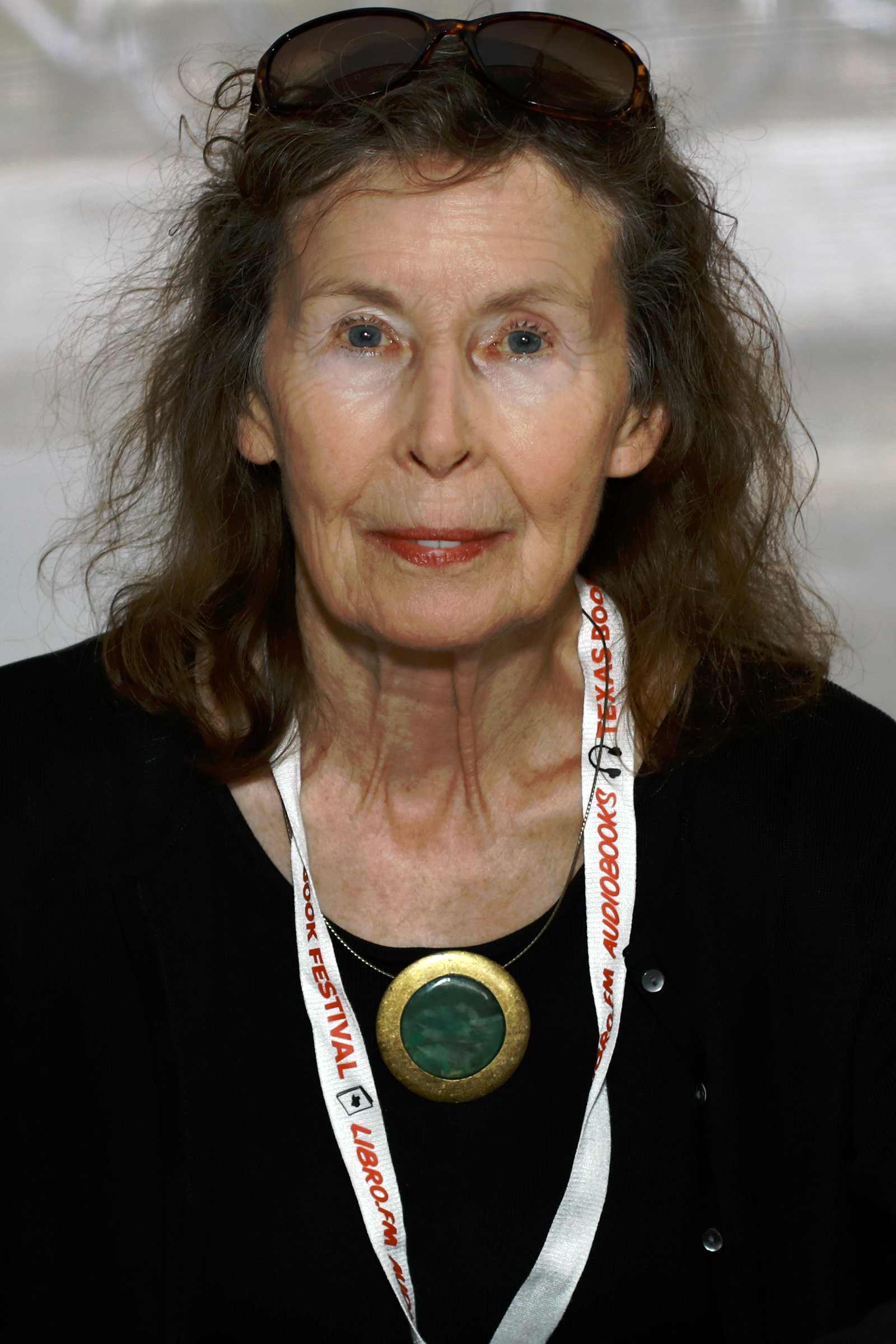
- Livesey at the 2024 Texas Book Festival.
- Born: 1953 (age 72–73)
- Education: University of York (BA)
- Occupations: Novelist, writer

Margot Livesey (/ˈmɑːrɡoʊ ˈlɪvziː/; born 1953) is a Scottish-born writer. She is the author of ten novels, a collection of short stories, a collection of essays on writing and the co-author, with Lynn Klamkin, of a textbook. Among other awards, she has earned a Guggenheim Fellowship, a National Endowment for the Arts Fellowship, the PEN New England Award, and the Massachusetts Book Award.

Livesey's stories and essays have appeared in The New Yorker, The Atlantic Monthly, and a number of literary quarterlies. She was formerly the fiction editor at Ploughshares, an American literary journal. Livesey served as a judge for the PEN/Bellwether Prize for Socially Engaged Fiction in 2012.

She currently divides her time between Cambridge, Massachusetts, and Iowa City, Iowa, where she is a member of the faculty at the Writers’ Workshop at the University of Iowa. She has also taught at Boston University, Bowdoin College, Brandeis University, Carnegie Mellon University, Cleveland State University, Emerson College, Tufts University, the Warren Wilson College MFA Program for Writers, and Williams College. She has frequently been a faculty member at the Bread Loaf and Sewanee writers’ conferences, among other conferences.

== Early life ==
Livesey was raised on the grounds of what was then a Scottish private boys' school, Glenalmond College, approximately 50 miles north of Edinburgh. Her father, John Kenneth Livesey, was a teacher at the school, while her mother, Eva Barbara (McEwen) Livesey, was a nurse. Her mother died when Livesey was two years old and her father remarried.

After earning a Bachelor of Arts degree at the University of York, where she read philosophy and English, Livesey began to spend time in Toronto where she waitressed to support herself as she pursued writing fiction. Her first fiction publication was a short story, "Someone Else's," in Prism International in 1976.

== Career ==
In 1983, Livesey joined the faculty at Tufts University and in 1986 published her first book, a collection of stories, which included nine short stories, and a novella, "Learning By Heart," which gave the volume its title.

Her first novel, Homework, appeared in 1990. The story of an Edinburgh book editor who enters a relationship with the father of a disturbed child, the novel was short listed for the W.H. Smith first novel in Canada award. Criminals (1996) is about a banker who finds an abandoned infant in a bus station restroom and ends up leaving the baby with his sister. The Missing World (2000) is about a woman who loses her memory of the last three years and whose duplicitous former boyfriend exploits that loss to resume their relationship.

Eva Moves the Furniture (2001) took Livesey twelve years to write, in part because it drew more closely on her own life than her previous works. She based the novel's eponymous protagonist on stories she had heard about her mother, Eva McEwen, and especially about her relationship with the supernatural. Like the real Eva, the fictional Eva loses her mother in childbirth. The loss brings her two unexpected companions: the spirits of a young girl and an older woman, who follow Eva through her life, influencing it, sometimes rearranging the furniture, and sometimes causing trouble.

Banishing Verona (2004) is told from alternating points of view — Zeke, a twenty-something house painter with Asperger's, and Verona, a radio host in her late 30s. The two meet in the novel's opening pages, when Verona, single and seven months pregnant, shows up at the house where Zeke is working, claiming to be related to its owners who have left town. When Zeke returns the next morning, Verona has gone; the two spend the rest of the novel trying to reconnect.

The House on Fortune Street (2008) is constructed of four interwoven narratives: two centered on women, Abigail, an actress who owns the titular house, and Dara, a therapist who rents the downstairs apartment, and two on men: Abigail's academic boyfriend, Sean, who is working on his dissertation about John Keats, and Dara's estranged father, Cameron, a photographer who struggles with his feelings for young girls. Each character's section possesses what Livesey calls a "literary godparent," a writer whose work in some way influences the character's life: For Sean, it's Keats; for Abigail, it's Charles Dickens; for Dara it's Charlotte Brontë, and for Cameron, it's Charles Dodgson (Lewis Carroll).

The Flight of Gemma Hardy (2012) again connects its main character to a literary figure, as Livesey set out to write a reimagining of Charlotte Brontë's Jane Eyre, a novel that had influenced her since she encountered it as a young girl. Livesey set her novel in 1950s and 60s Scotland, and much of it echoes the story of Brontë's novel. Gemma, an orphan, is shunted off to do menial work at a school. Not long after she turns 18, she moves to the Orkney Islands to work as a governess and meets a wealthy man, Hugh Sinclair. The two seem to be moving toward marriage until Gemma learns a secret that causes her to feel betrayed. Livesey does not follow Jane Eyre in every respect. In a notable departure from the original, Gemma's father is Icelandic. Her quest to discover her heritage is a crucial part of the narrative.

Mercury (2016) is about a couple struggling in a strained marriage. The first section is narrated by Donald, a Scotsman who has migrated to the United States where he lives in Boston and works as an optometrist. Although his profession is to help others see more clearly, Donald struggles to see even some of the most obvious truths about his life. The second section is narrated by Viv, who used to work in mutual funds and now works at a stable. There, she encounters a horse, Mercury, whom she considers "the most amazing horse [she'd] ever seen." As she dreams about competing on Mercury, Viv begins to feel hopeful about her life again. When she fears that someone is trying to harm him, she acquires a gun, precipitating a traumatic event that changes the lives of her and her family.

In 2017, Livesey published The Hidden Machinery, a collection of essays about writing; many of the essays began as lectures she gave as a teacher at a university or at a writers' conference. She has taught at the Iowa Writers' Workshop.

The Boy in the Field (2020) is about two brothers and their sister who, walking home from school together one day, discover a seriously injured boy in a field. The story follows them as their lives are changed by the discovery. The New York Times cited it among its 100 Notable Books for 2020. Livesey's tenth novel, The Road from Belhaven was published by Knopf in February 2024.

== Awards and honors ==
- Massachusetts Book Award, 2018
- Radcliffe Institute Fellowship, 2012-3
- NEIBA Award, 2012
- 2009 L.L. Winship/PEN New England Award, The House on Fortune Street
- Guggenheim Foundation Fellow, 1997-8
- National Endowment for the Arts Fellowship, 1986
- Canada Council for the Arts Fellowship, 1983

== Bibliography ==
Short stories

- Learning by Heart, 1986

Novels

- Homework, 1990
- Criminals, 1996
- The Missing World, 2000
- Eva Moves the Furniture, 2001
- Banishing Verona, 2004
- The House on Fortune Street, 2008
- The Flight of Gemma Hardy, 2012
- Mercury, 2016
- The Boy in the Field, 2020
- The Road from Belhaven, 2024.

Essays

- The Hidden Machinery: Essays on Writing, 2018
