= Mercury 5 =

Mercury 5 or variants may refer to:

- Mercury 5, a spacecraft of Project Mercury
- Mercury V, a version of the Bristol Mercury aircraft engine

== See also ==
- Mercury-Atlas 5, a 1961 uncrewed space flight
