= Mercury House =

Mercury House may refer to:

- Mercury House (publishers), a book publishing company based in San Francisco
- Mercury House (London building), a building in London, headquarters of Cable and Wireless
- Marketgate, a building in Bristol, formerly called Mercury House
