= Mercury (1786 ship) =

History

Great Britain
- Name: Mercury
- Owner: 1794:John St Barbe; 1798:Tooke & Co.; 1800:T. Ritchie
- Builder: Topsham
- Launched: 1786
- Fate: Wrecked 1802

General characteristics
- Tons burthen: 200, or 202, or 20283/94 (bm)
- Length: Overall:85 ft 0 in (25.9 m); Keel:66 ft 11 in (20.4 m)
- Beam: 23 ft 10 1/2 in (7.3 m)
- Depth of hold: 11 ft 9 in (3.6 m)
- Complement: 18
- Armament: 1794:6 × 12-pounder guns; 1800:6 × 12-pounder carronades

Mercury apparently was launched in 1786 at Topsham, but her career prior to 1790 is obscure. She initially traded with Virginia and then with the "Straits". In 1794-1795 she made one voyage for the British East India Company (EIC). On her return she became a West Indiaman. She was lost in 1802.

== Career ==
Mercury's career pre-1790 is currently obscure. The Topsham-built Mercury entered Lloyd's Register in 1790 with R. Scovell, master, St Barbe, owner, and trade London–Virginia, changing to London-Straits. Then in 1792 her master changed from R. Scovell to J. Christall.

=== EIC voyage (1794–1795) ===
Before the EIC hired Mercury it had Young, of Rotherhithe, repair and measure her. Captain John Cristall acquired a letter of marque on 10 May 1794, and sailed from Plymouth on 24 June, bound for Bengal. She reached the Cape of Good Hope on 27 September, and arrived at Calcutta on 23 January 1805. Homeward bound, Mercury was at Sagar Island on 17 March, reached St Helena on 18 June and the River Shannon on 13 September, and arrived at The Downs on 15 October.

=== West Indiaman ===
Lloyd's Register for 1798 showed Mercury's master as Grant, changing to Tayler, her owner as J. Tooke, and her trade as London–Tobago.

Lloyd's Register for 1800 showed Mercury's master changing from Taylor to T. Ritchie, her owner from Tooke to T. Ritchie, and her trade from to London–Tobago to London–New Providence. It also showed her as having had damages repaired in 1797.

Lloyd's Register for 1802 showed Mercury's master changing from D. Gibb, to Ritchie, and her trade from London–Martinique to London−Leith. It also showed her as having undergone a repair in 1802.

== Fate ==
Lloyd's List reported on 21 December 1802 that Mercury, Richie, master, had been lost off Lowestoffe while sailing from Leith to London. The crew was saved.

Lloyd's Register for 1803 and 1804 showed Mercury trading between Leith and the Baltic, but that almost surely represented a plan for 1803 with the data carried over to 1804.

The British Library summary records of EIC voyages attributed a second voyage in 1806–1807 from Bengal to London to Mercury. Hackman does not record that voyage, and the British Library is clearly conflating two different vessels named Mercury, the second voyage possibly referring to Mercury (1806 ship).
