= Mercury City =

Mercury City may refer to:

- Mercury City Tower, skyscraper in Moscow, Russia
- Merqury City Meltdown, course in SSX
