= Songa Mercur =

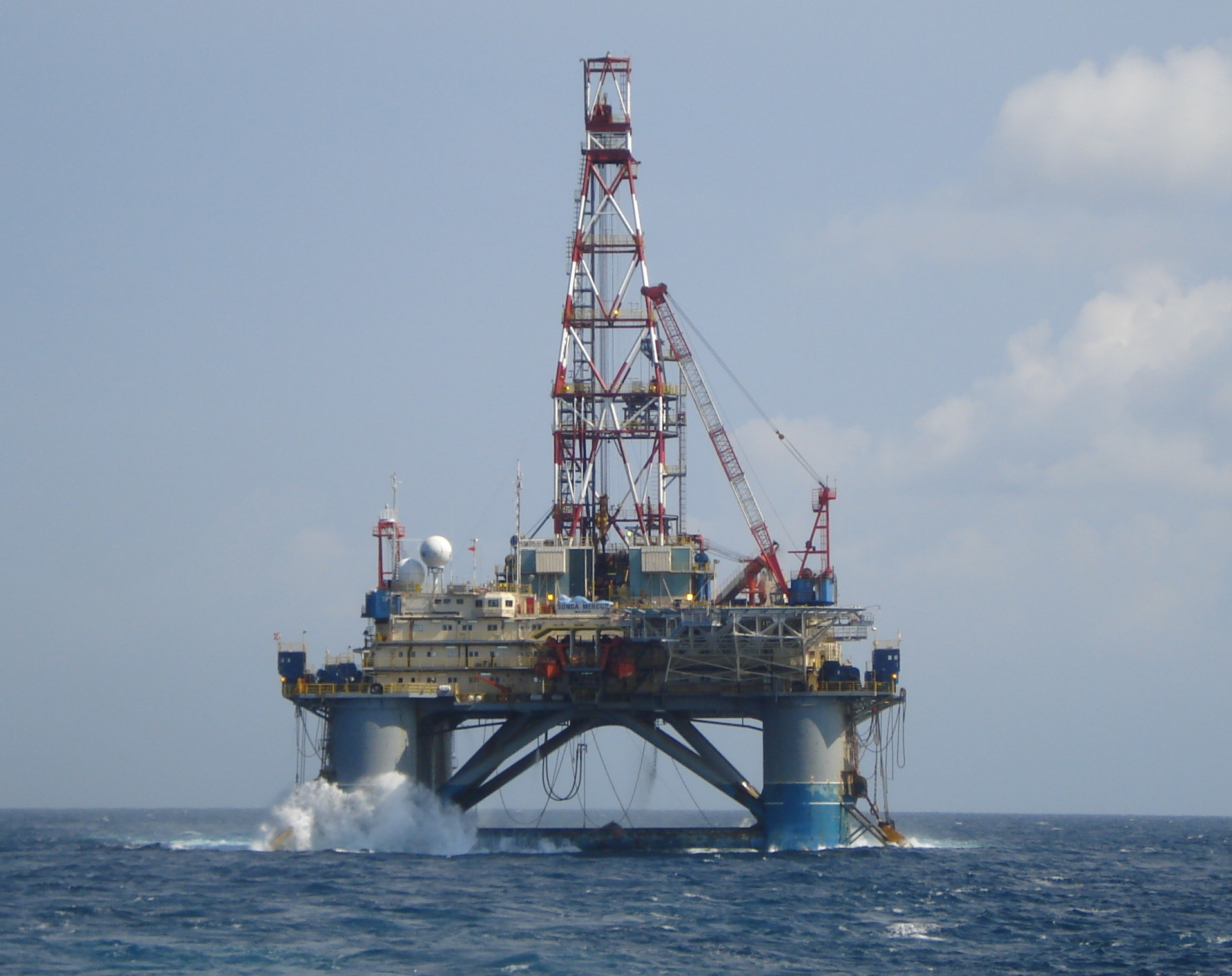
- Songa Mercur

History
- Name: Songa Mercur
- Owner: Opus Offshore
- Operator: Songa-Opus JV
- Port of registry: Marshall Islands, Majuro
- Builder: Vyborg Shipyard
- Yard number: 113515
- Laid down: 24 July 1984
- Completed: 14 June 1990
- Identification: Call sign: V7IG6; DNV ID: 22894; IMO number: 8755376
- Fate: 2018 scrapped in Chittagong

General characteristics
- Type: Semi-submersible platform
- Tonnage: 12,660 GT; 3,798 NT
- Length: 98 m (321 ft 6 in)
- Beam: 64.2 m (210 ft 8 in)
- Draught: 5.6 m (18 ft 4 in)
- Depth: 24.5 m (80 ft 5 in)

Songa Mercur was a semi-submersible drilling rig designed by Friede & Goldman, ex Shelf 10 and La Muralla. It is capable of drilling in water up to a depth of 1,200 feet (370 m).

In May 2006, Songa Offshore signed a nine-month contract with Chevron to use the rig in Australia. A contract was later signed with Santos Limited, which was originally nine months and was extended to a year and then a year and a half. In 2013, the rig was contracted by Idemitsu Oil and Gas for drilling off Vietnam.

In 2014, Songa Offshore sold the rig to Opus Offshore as a part of the deal creating Songa-Opus joint venture.

== See also ==
- Semi-submersible Platform
- drilling platform
