= Merkuriy, Kursk Oblast =

Settlement in Kursk Oblast, Russia

Coordinates: 52°18′22″N 35°20′21″E

Merkuriy (Russian: Меркурий) is a settlement in Zheleznogorsky District, Kursk Oblast, Russia.

It was founded near Zheleznogorsk by the state-owned company Agropromkomplektatsiya in 2024.
