= Mercury Cyclecar Company =

Defunct American motor vehicle manufacturer

Mercury Cyclecar
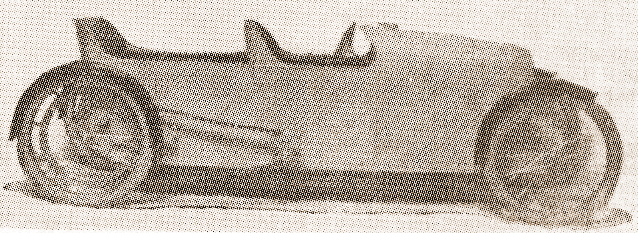
- Mercury Model A Cyclecar

Overview
- Type: Cyclecar
- Manufacturer: Mercury Cyclecar Company
- Production: 1913–1914
- Assembly: Detroit, Michigan

Body and chassis
- Class: Cyclecar

The Mercury was a cyclecar built in Detroit, Michigan, by the Mercury Cyclecar Company at 807 South Scotten Street in 1913-1914.

== History ==
The Mercury Cyclecar had a self-supporting body that eliminated the need for a chassis frame. The vehicle was equipped with a two-cylinder air-cooled 9.8-horsepower (7.3 kW) V-twin engine from DeLuxe which also supplied power for the Sears Dreadnought and Minneapolis motorcycles and other brands. It used a friction transmission and a copper-riveted V belt final drive. Body styles were the tandem two-seater, a one-seater for salesman use, and a light delivery van. The factory was set up at the former location of the Detroit Tribune when operations of the newspaper had ended earlier, and the car company was established by W.J. Marshall and R.C. Albertus. A prototype was completed and test driven by 15 November 1913, claiming to be the first cyclecar sold in Detroit.

The car used unibody construction, a transverse half-elliptic spring supporting the front axle, and two quarter elliptic springs under the rear axle. It had a 100 in (2,540 mm) wheelbase. The car was selected by the Michigan State Automobile School, who bought the Mercury Cyclecar Company when the company went bankrupt, and initially decided to continue to manufacturer and sell the car for $200 ($6,365 in 2025 dollars), then the school reconsidered the idea. W.J. Marshall then relocated the business to 815 South Scotten Street when he became general manager of H. Collier Smith Company that manufactured sheet metal fabricating machinery.
