= Mercury (name) =

Both a surname and a given name

Mercury is both a surname and a given name. Notable people with the name include:

== Surname ==
- Daniela Mercury (born 1965), Brazilian singer
- Eric Mercury (1944–2022), Canadian singer
- Freddie Mercury (1946–1991), singer of the British rock group Queen
- Joey Mercury (born 1979), American professional wrestler whose real name is Adam Birch
- Poppy Mercury (1972–1995), Indonesian singer

== Given name or nickname ==
- Mercury Hayes (born 1973), former professional American football wide receiver
- Mercury Morris (born 1947), former American football player
- Mercury Stardust (born 1987), American educator, TikToker, and activist
