= Mercury 6 =

Mercury 6 or variants may refer to:

- Mercury 6, a spacecraft of Project Mercury
- Mercury VI, several versions of the Bristol Mercury aircraft engine

== See also ==
- Mercury-Atlas 6, the first American orbital spaceflight, 1962
