= HMS Mercury =

HMS Mercury (1779) cutting out a French gunboat from Rovigno, 1 April 1809

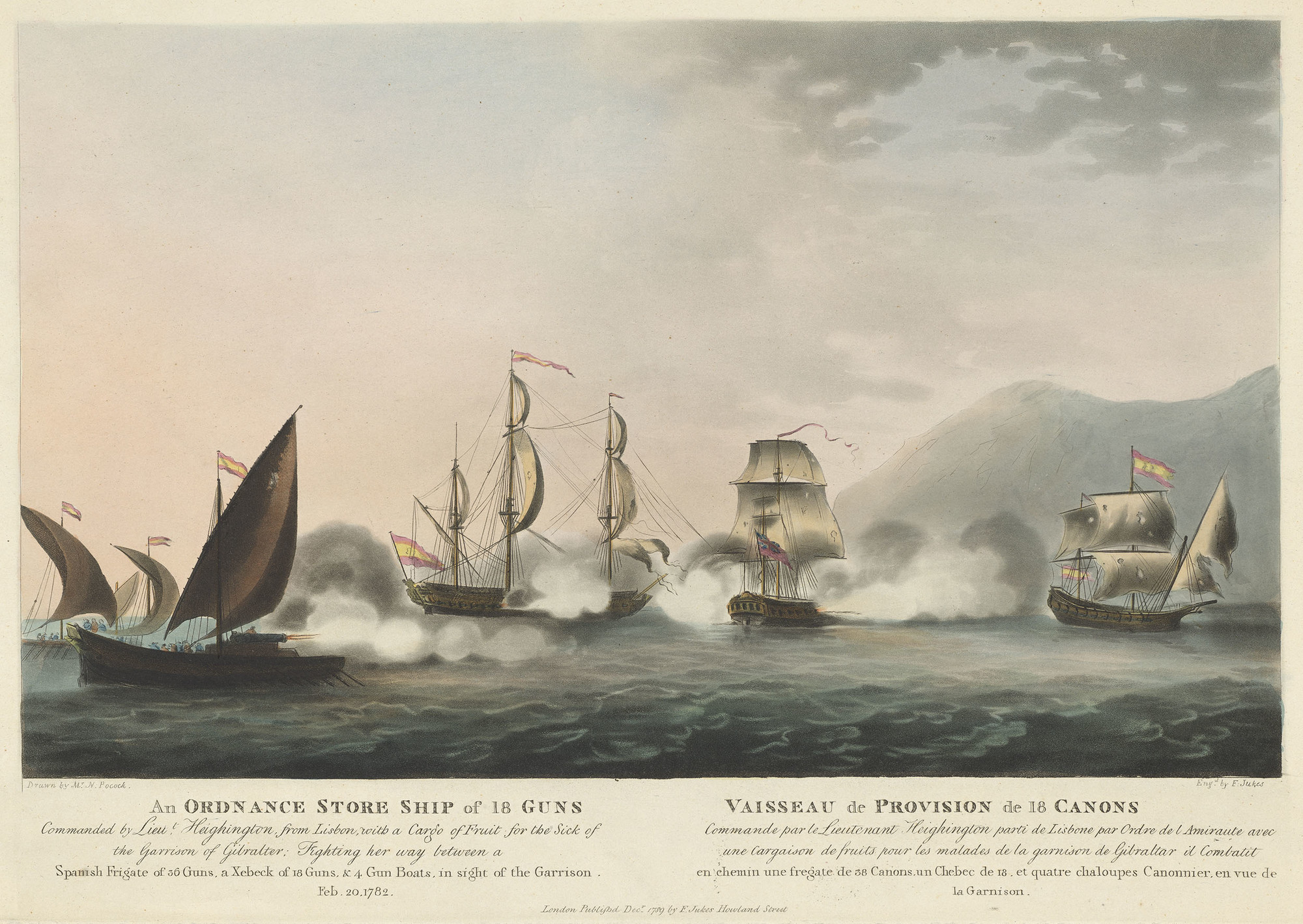
18 gun ordnance store ship Mercury, Lieut. Heighington R.N. breaking the blockade of Gibraltar in 1782

Eighteen Royal Navy ships and two schools have borne the name HMS Mercury, or HMS Mercure, after the God Mercury, of Roman mythology

== Ships ==
- HMS Mercury (1592) was a 6-gun galley launched in 1592 and sold in 1611.
- HMS Mercury (1620) was a ship launched in 1620. Her fate is unknown.
- HMS Mercury (1622) was a ship purchased in 1622. Her fate is unknown.
- HMS Mercury (1694) was a 6-gun advice boat launched in 1694 and captured by a French privateer in 1697.
- HMS Mercury (1739) was an 8-gun fireship purchased in 1739 and foundered in 1744.
- HMS Mercury (1744) was a 16-gun brigantine launched in 1744 and captured in 1745.
- HMS Mercury (1745) was a 24-gun sixth rate launched in 1745 and broken up in 1753.
- HMS Mercury (1756) was a 20-gun sixth rate launched in 1756 and wrecked in 1777.
- HMS Mercury (1760) was an unrated schooner in service 1760–65.
- HMS Mercury (1779) was a 28-gun sixth rate launched in 1779 and broken up in 1814.
- HMS Mercure (1798) was an 18-gun sloop. She was formerly a French privateer that Phaeton and Anson captured in 1798. She was renamed HMS Trompeuse in 1799 and foundered in 1800.
- HMS Mercury (1807) was a tender launched in 1807 and broken up in 1835.
- HMS Mercury (1826) was a 46-gun fifth rate launched in 1826, used as a coal hulk from 1861 and sold in 1906.
- HMS Mercury (1837) was a cutter tender launched in 1837, renamed YC6 in 1866, HMS Plymouth in 1876, and sold in 1904.
- HMS Mercury (1878) was an Iris-class cruiser and despatch vessel launched in 1878, converted to a depot ship in 1906, and sold in 1919. She was to have been named HMS Columbine in 1912, but this did not happen.
- HMS Mercury (1892) was an auxiliary minesweeper sunk during World War I.
- HMS Mercury (1934) was a paddle steamer requisition during World War II for use as an auxiliary minesweeper which struck a mine and sank in 1940.

== School ==
HMS Mercury (shore establishment) was a Royal Naval Communications/Signal School sited at Leydene House near Petersfield, Hampshire, in commission from 1941 until 1993. A subsidiary (HMS Mercury II) was also created.

== See also ==
- HCS Mercury (1806), a 14-gun brig launched at Bombay Dockyard in 1806 for the naval arm of the British East India Company and lost at sea in 1833.
- Mercury (1806 ship) or Mercury Packet, launched at Calcutta in 1806 and sold at Java in 1822.
- TS Mercury, a naval training establishment until 1968 at Hamble in Hampshire, founded as a ship in 1885.
