= Mercury Theatre (disambiguation) =

Mercury Theatre most often refers to:

- Mercury Theatre (1937–1946), an independent repertory theatre company founded in New York City by Orson Welles and producer John Houseman.

Mercury Theatre may also refer to:

== Theatre buildings ==
=== England ===
- Mercury Theatre, Notting Hill Gate, London, 1933–1987
- Mercury Theatre, Colchester, opened 1972

=== New Zealand ===
- Mercury Theatre, Auckland, founded 1910

== Theatre companies ==
=== Australia ===
- Mercury Theatre (Australia), originally St James' Hall, Sydney, later renamed by actor Peter Finch

== Entertainment ==
- The Mercury Theatre on the Air, originally titled First Person Singular, a 1938 radio drama anthology series created by Orson Welles
