= Mercury FM (disambiguation) =

Mercury FM was a radio station in Crawley and Horsham.

Mercury FM may also refer to:

- Heart Hertfordshire
- KMFM Medway
- KMFM West Kent
