= Russian brig Merkuriy =

Imperial Russian Navy warship

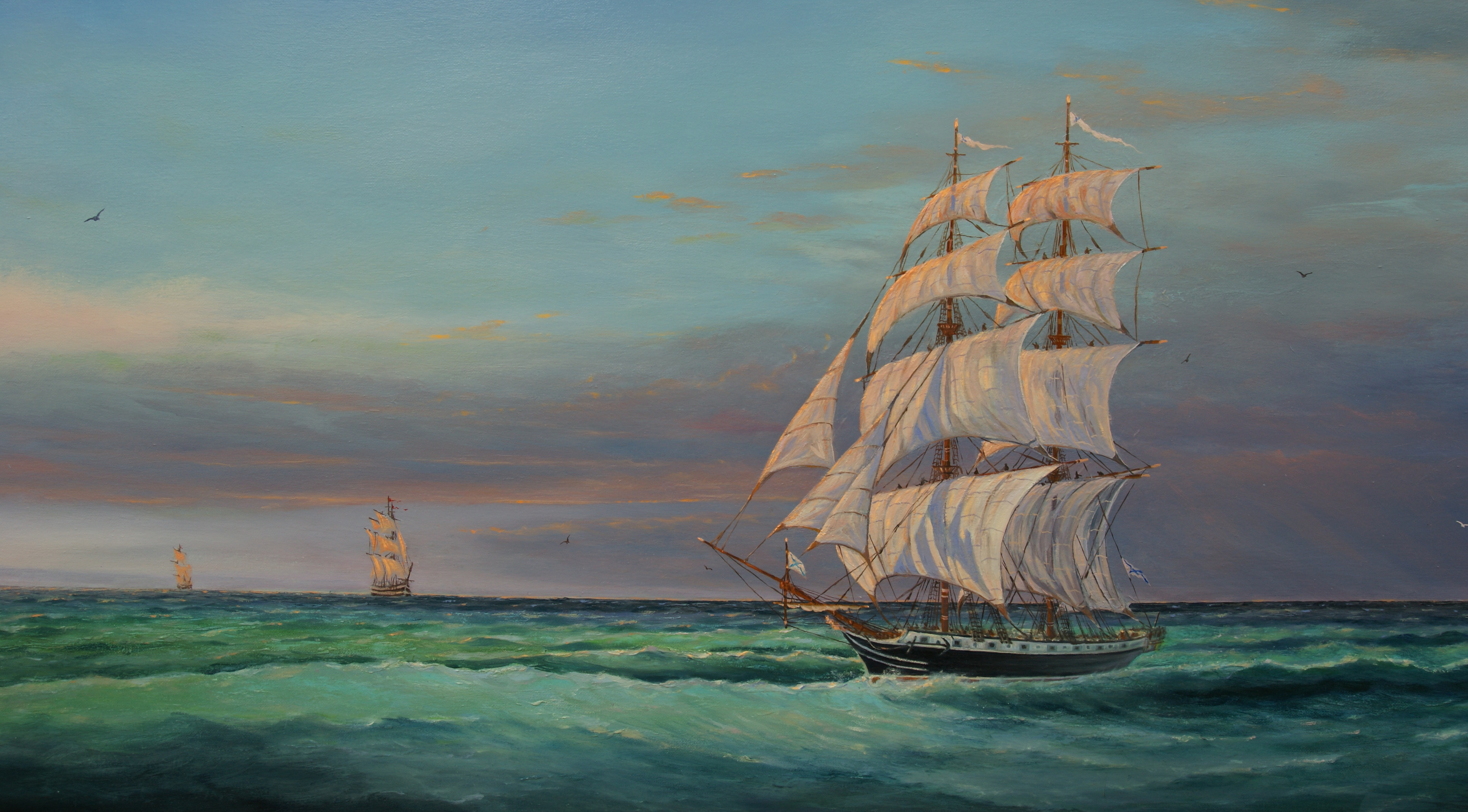
- Meeting of the Brig "Merkuriy" with a Turkish Squadron by Vladimir Kosov

History

Russian Empire
- Name: Merkuriy
- Builder: Sevastopol Shipyard
- Laid down: 9 February [O.S. 28 January] 1819
- Launched: 19 May [O.S. 7 May] 1820
- Decommissioned: 1857
- Fate: Scrapped

General characteristics
- Class & type: 20-gun brig
- Displacement: 445 tonnes (438 long tons; 491 short tons) (Note: According to some sources, a displacement of 456 tonnes (449 long tons; 503 short tons).)
- Length: 29.5 m (96 ft 8 in)
- Beam: 9.4 m (30 ft 10 in)
- Draught: 4.2 m (13 ft 9 in)
- Depth of hold: 4.1 m (13 ft 5 in) (Note: According to some sources, a depth of hold of 2.9 m (9 ft 8 in).)
- Propulsion: Sails; Fourteen oars
- Sail plan: 856 m^{2} (9,215 sq ft); Two square-rigged masts with studding sails, jibs, staysails, and a gaff-rigged sail
- Complement: 115
- Armament: 18 × 24-pounder carronades; 2 × 3-pounder long guns (Note: According to some sources, an armament of eighteen 24-pounder carronades and two 8-pounder long guns.)

Merkuriy (Russian: Меркурий, lit. 'Mercury'; Russian pre-reform: Меркурій) was a 20-gun brig—a two-masted sailing warship of the Imperial Russian Navy. It is famous for its lopsided battle with two Ottoman Navy ships, which took place on 26 May [O.S. 14 May] 1829 during the Russo-Turkish War of 1828–1829.

The name Pamiat Merkuria (Russian: Память Меркурия, lit. 'In Memory of Merkuriy') was given to a number of ships of the Russian Black Sea Fleet.

== Battle on May 26, 1829 ==
=== Summary ===
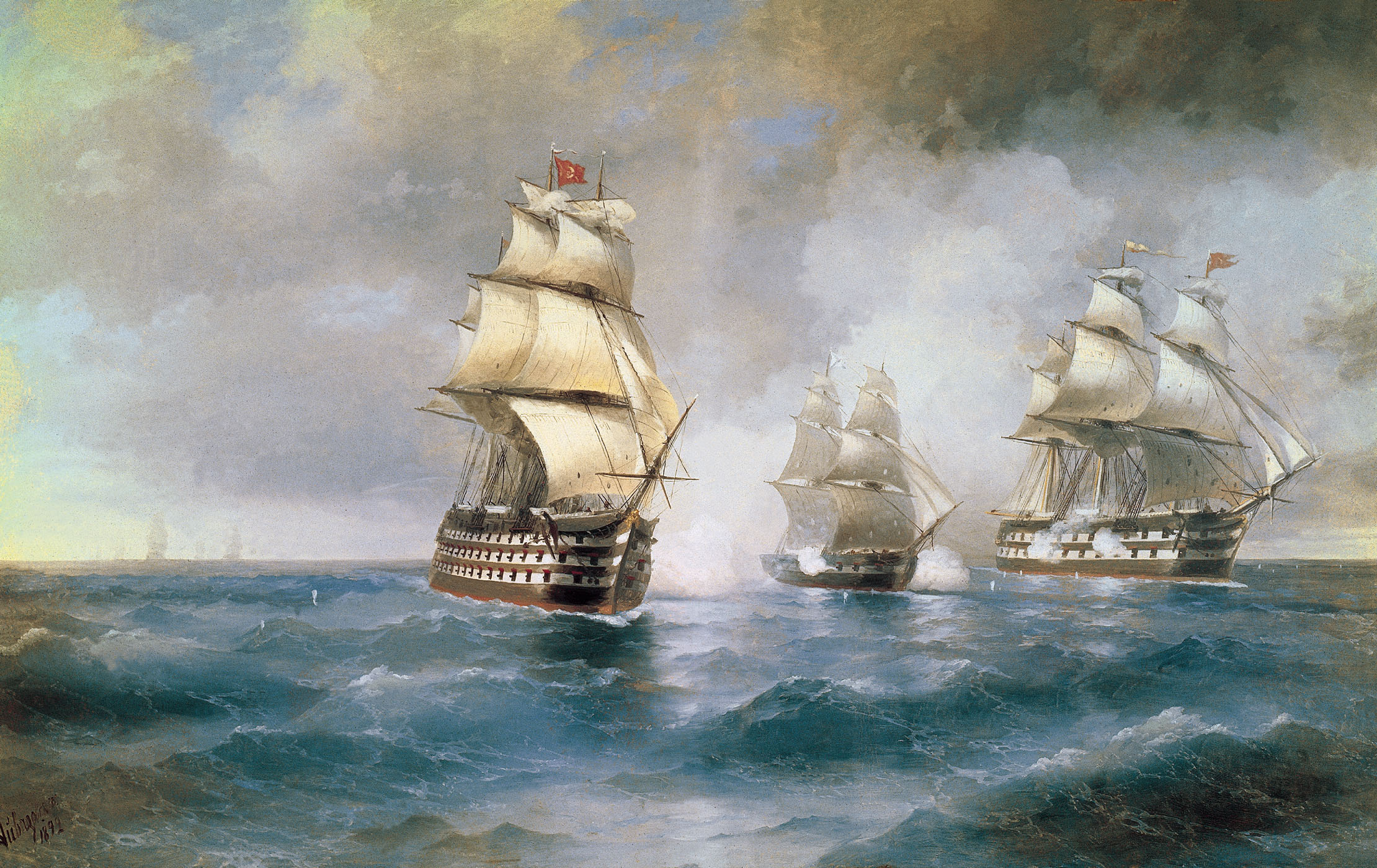
Brig "Mercury" Attacked by Two Turkish Ships by Ivan Aivazovsky; oil on canvas, 1892

Pursued by a Turkish fleet (6 ships of the line, 2 frigates, 2 corvettes, 1 brig, and 3 tenders), the Russian brig Merkuriy engaged in a lopsided battle with the ships of the line Selimiye (110 guns) and Riyala Bey (Note: The Riyala Bey ship name (Russian: Реал-бей) is cited according to some Russian sources. In reality, the name of the second Turkish ship of the line is not reliably known.) (74 guns) near the Bosporus Strait. After damaging the ships one by one, the brig escaped pursuit.

=== Crew (as of May 1829) ===
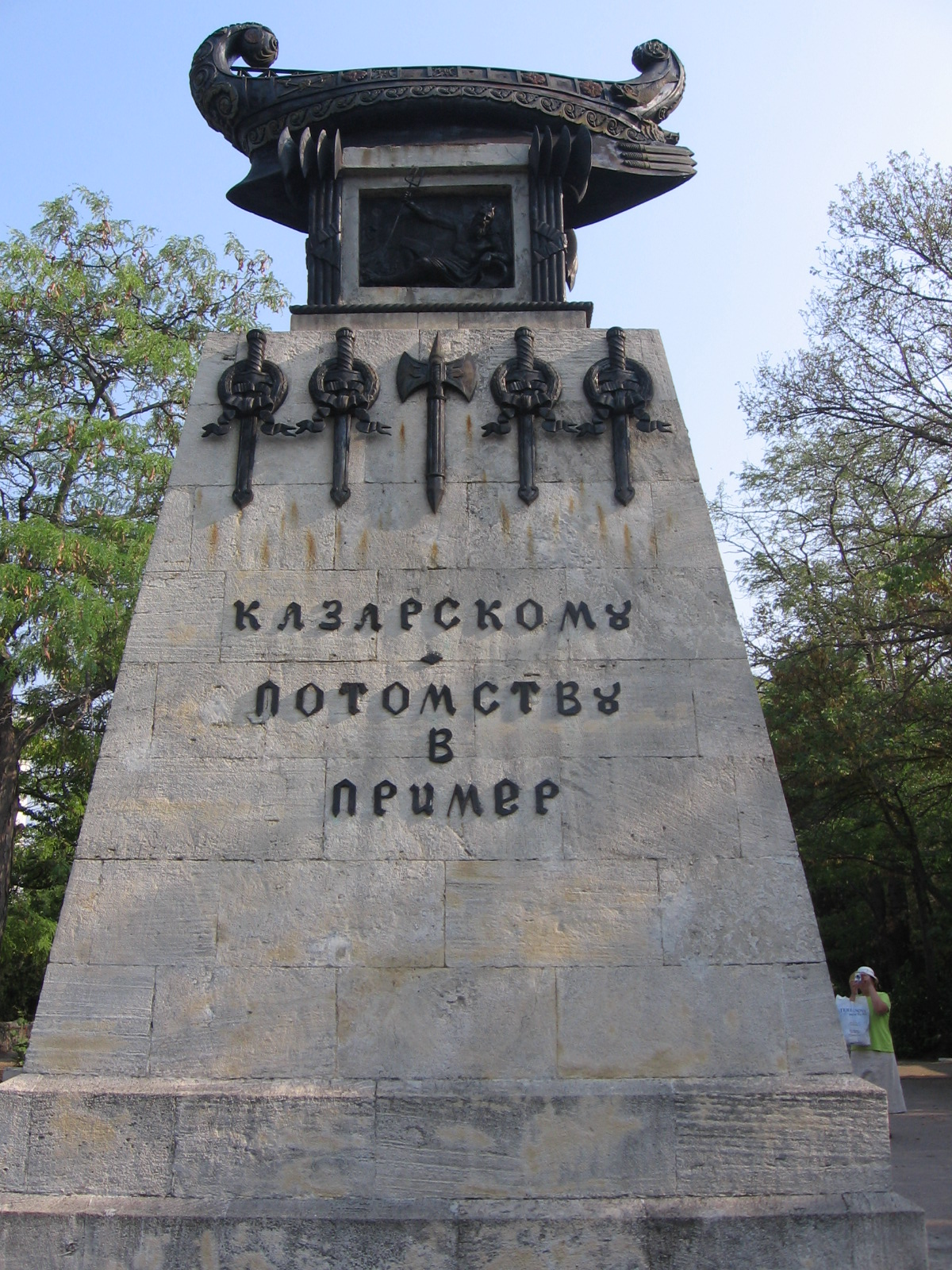
Monument to Alexander Kazarsky in Sevastopol (Alexander Brullov, 1839)

Officers:

- Aleksandr Ivanovich Kazarsky, Kapitan-leytenant
- Fyodor Mikhailovich Novosilsky, Leytenant
- Sergey Iosifovich Skariatin, Leytenant
- Dmitry Petrovich Pritupov, Michman
- Ivan Petrovich Prokofiev, Poruchik of the Naval Navigator Corps

One hundred and ten enlisted personnel.

=== Damage and casualties ===
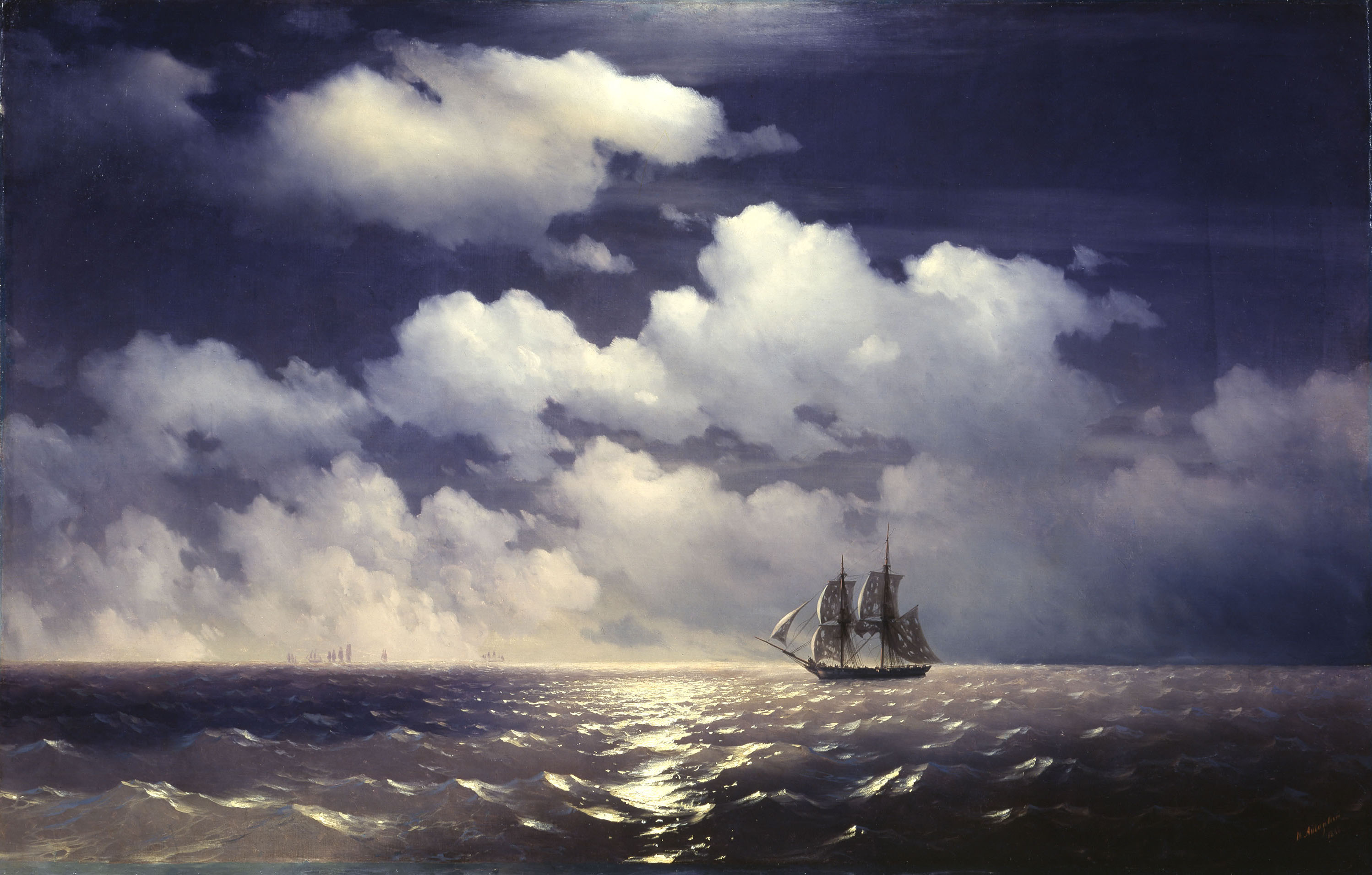
Brig "Merkuriy" after a Victory over Two Turkish Ships by Ivan Aivazovsky; oil on canvas, 1848

As a result of the battle, the brig took 12 casualties, including 4 killed and 8 wounded. Damage to the ship included:

- 22 hull breaches
- 133 sail plan breaches
- 16 spar breaches
- 148 instances of rigging damage
- All ship's boats were lost

By official information, neither Turkish ships lost crew as the brig's main objective during the battle was to damage their spars and rigging.

== In art ==
Ivan Aivazovsky created 3 paintings featuring the ship:

- Brig "Merkuriy" Leading a Battle with Two Turkish Ships / Бриг «Меркурий» ведёт бой с двумя турецкими судами
- Brig "Merkuriy" meets Russian Fleet after a Victory over Two Turkish Ships on 15.05.1829 / Бриг «Меркурий» после победы над двумя турецкими кораблями встречается с русской эскадрой 15.05.1829; oil on canvas, 123 × 190 cm, State Russian Museum, 1848
- Brig "Mercury" Attacked by Two Turkish Ships / Бриг «Меркурий», атакованный двумя турецкими кораблями; oil on canvas, 212 × 339 cm, Aivazovsky Picture Gallery, Feodosia, 1892

Several other artists created notable works featuring Merkuriy:

- Barri: Battle of Brig "Merkuriy" with Two Turkish Ships / Барри: Бой брига «Меркурий» с двумя турецкими кораблями
- Ivanov: Brig "Merkuriy" / Иванов: Бриг «Меркурий»
- A. N. Lubyanov: Brig "Merkuriy" / А. Н. Лубянов: Бриг «Меркурий»
- N. P. Krasovskiy: Battle of Brig "Merkuriy" with Two Turkish Ships / Н. П. Красовский: Бой брига «Меркурий» с двумя турецкими кораблями
- Mikhail Stepanovitch Tkachenko: Battle of Brig "Merkuriy" with Turkish Ships on May 14, 1829 / Бой брига "Меркурий" с турецкими кораблями 14 мая 1829 года; oil on canvas, Central Naval Museum, St. Petersburg, 1907

=== Critics of the Aivazovsky painting ===
The position of the ships portrayed by Aivazovsky in his work has been criticized as being historically inaccurate because of the brig's position between two significantly larger Turkish ships. Still, it's possible that Aivazovsky's artistic impression simply heightened the tension in the painting by accentuating the hopelessness of the brig's situation.

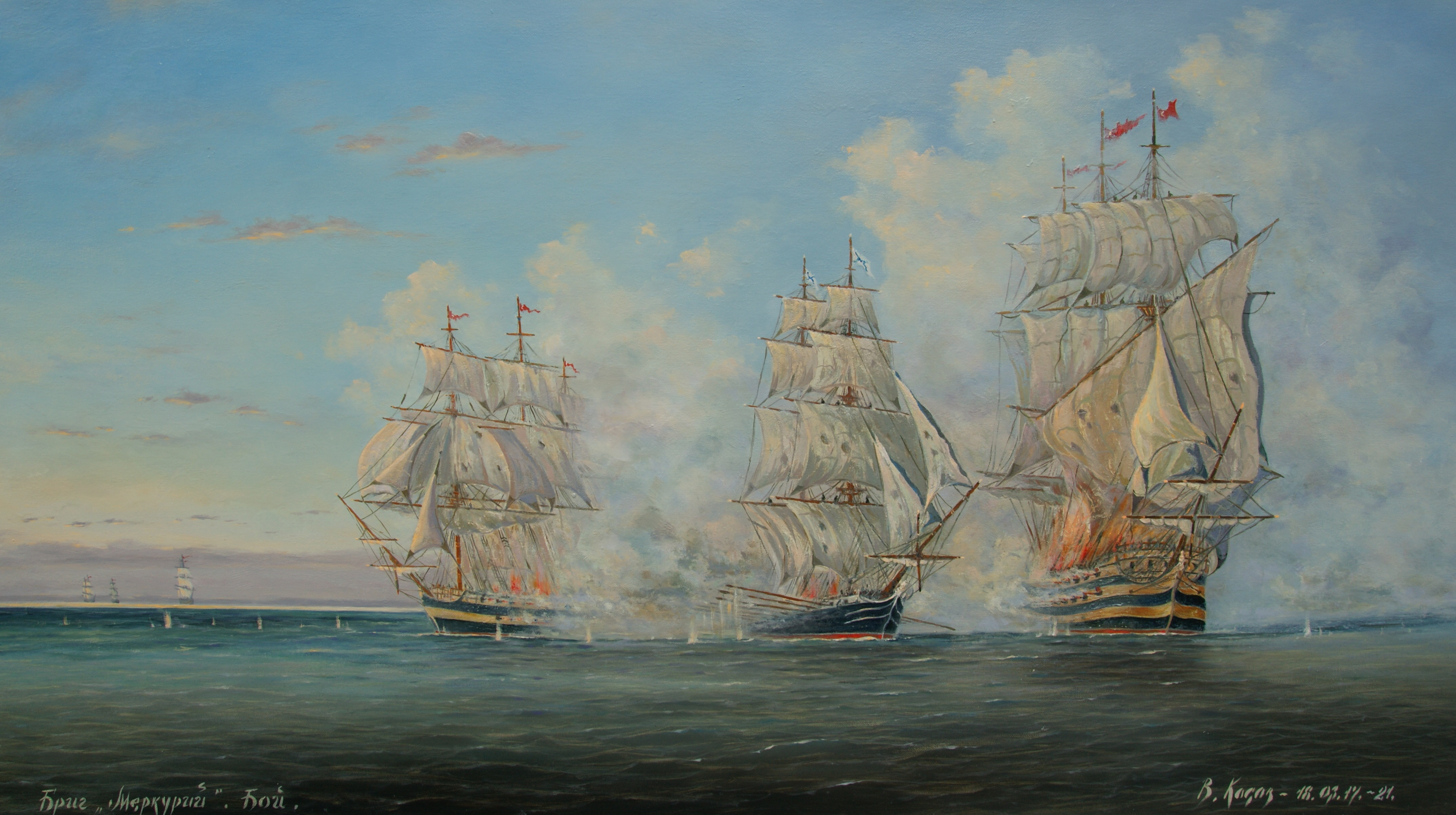
Fight of the Brig "Merkuriy" by Vladimir Kosov; 65 × 120 oil on canvas, 2017–2021

Paintings by other artists (Krasovskiy, Barri, Pechatin) of the same battle, though less known, portray a more realistic depiction of the battle.
