= Alexander Kazarsky =

Russian naval officer (1797–1833)

Aleksander Ivanovich Kazarsky
- Алекса́ндр Ива́нович Каза́рский
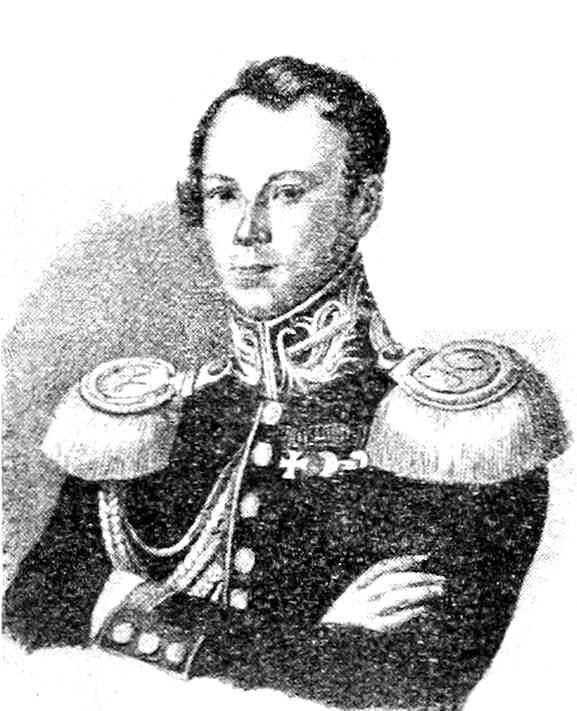
- Born: 16 June 1797
- Died: 16 June 1833 (aged 36)
- Military career
- Allegiance: Russian Empire
- Branch: Imperial Russian Navy
- Service years: 1811–1833
- Rank: Captain
- Conflicts: Russo-Turkish War

Aleksander Ivanovich Kazarsky (Belarusian: Алякса́ндр Іва́навіч Каза́рскі, Russian: Алекса́ндр Ива́нович Каза́рский; 16 June 1797 – 16 June 1833) was a Russian naval officer, the hero of the Russo-Turkish War (1828–1829). Kazarsky was the captain of brig Mercury and became famous after the victory in the battle against two Turkish ships of the line.

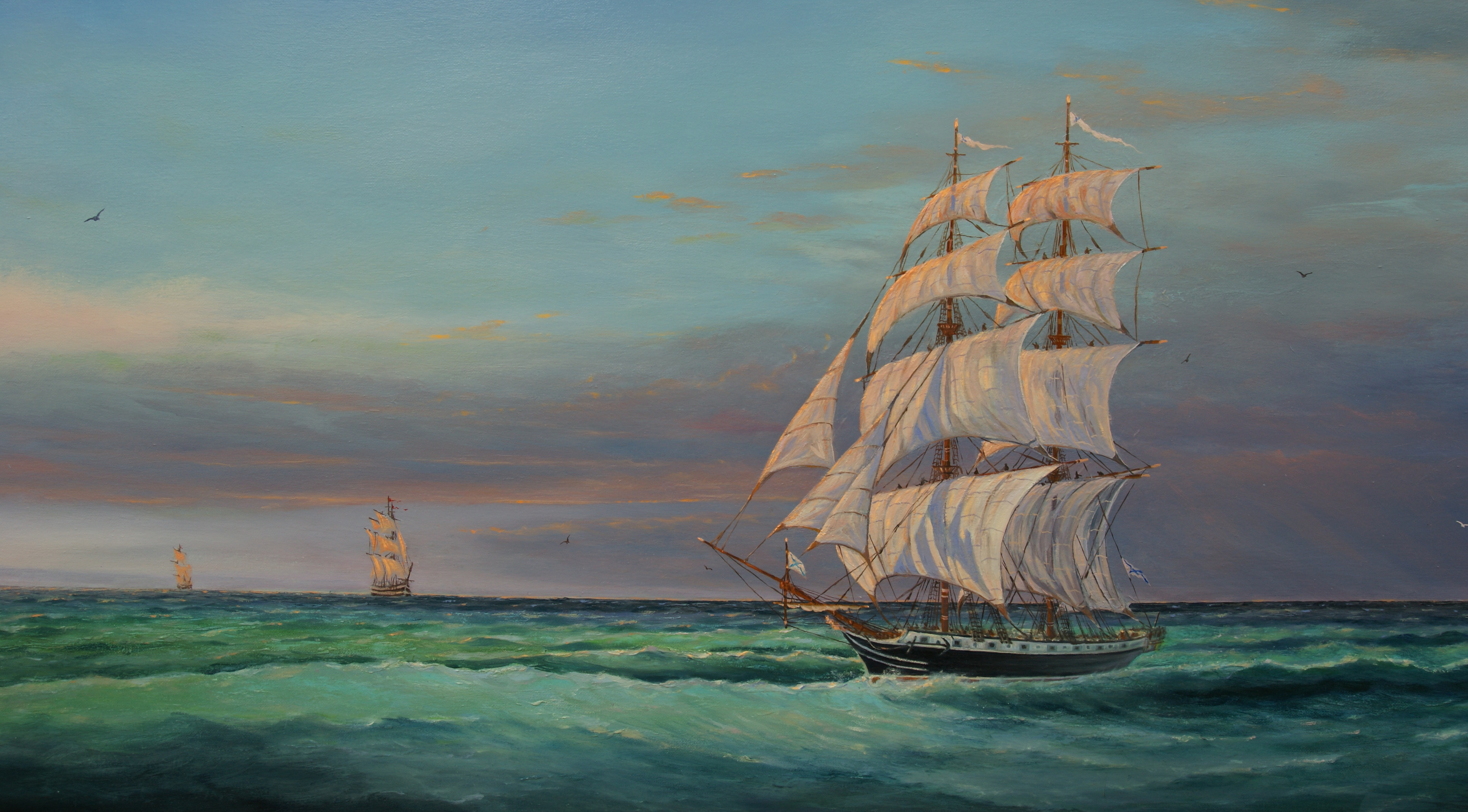
Brig Mercury Meeting with the Turkish squadron. Vladimir Kosov

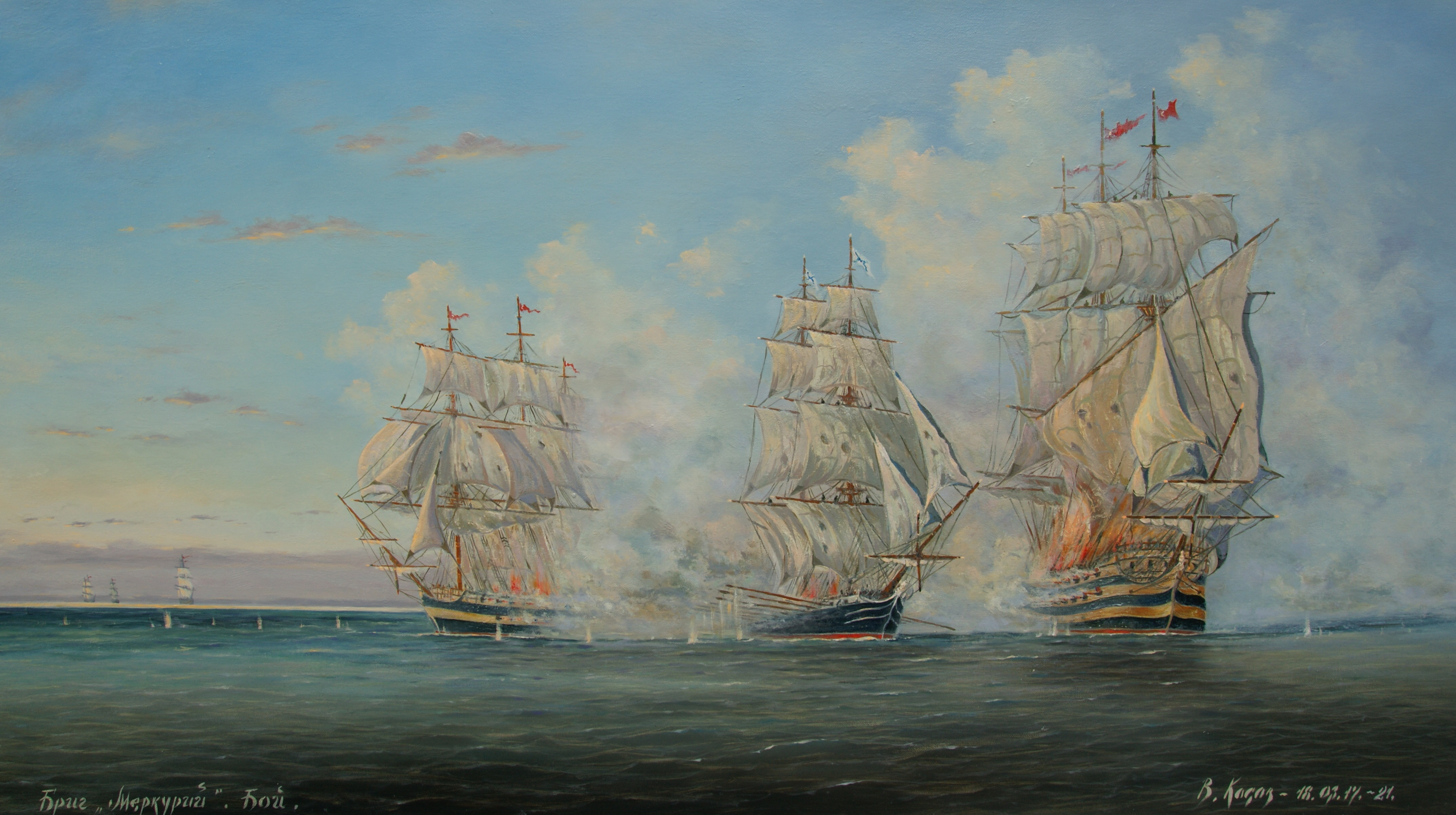
Fight brig Mercury. 65x120 oil on canvas 2017-2021 Vladimir Kosov

== Career ==
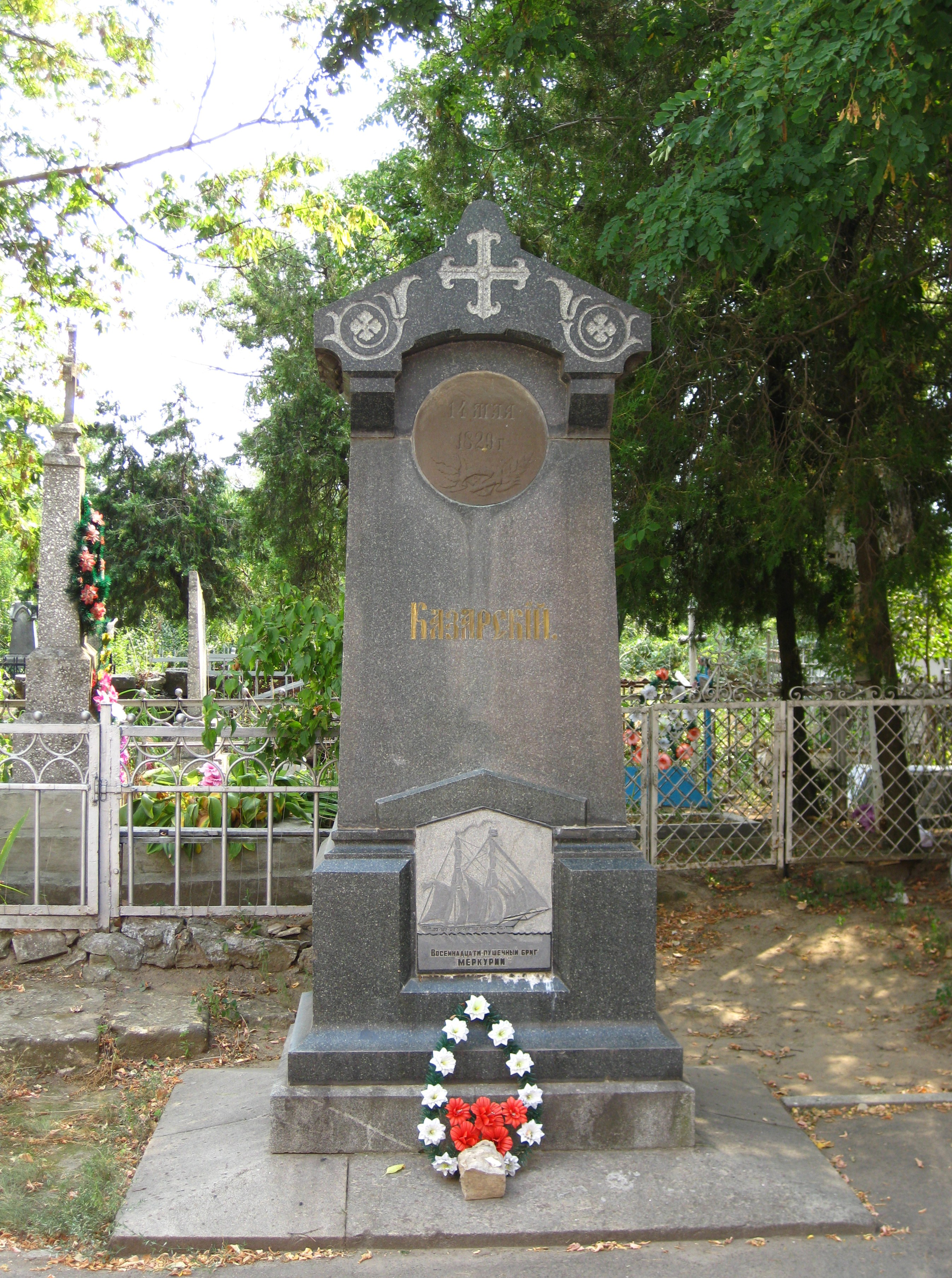
Kazarsky’s grave in Mykolaiv

Kazarsky joined the fleet in 1811 and became an officer in 1814. In 1829 as a Captain Lieutenant he was the captain of the 18-gun brig Mercury. On 14 May 1829 Mercury under the command of Kazarsky held off two Turkish ships of the line for four hours and badly damaged them before making her escape; for this action Kasarsky was promoted.

From 26 May to 17 July 1829 Kasarsky was the captain of frigate Pospeshny. From 1831 to 1833 Kazarsky was a member of the retinue of Nicholas I of Russia. In 1833 he was poisoned. A brig, a torpedo boat and a street in Sevastopol were named after him.
