= USS Mercury =

USS Mercury may refer to:

- USS Mercury (1776) was a ketch authorized by the Continental Congress in 1776 and captured off the Grand Banks of Newfoundland by the Royal Navy 10 September 1780
- USS Mercury (1781) was a schooner built in 1781 and served the Continental Navy as a packet, but facts of her service are unknown
- USS Mercury (1807) was a revenue cutter launched 6 April 1807 and served the Revenue Cutter Service until 1820
- USS Mercury (1861) was a sidewheel steamer tug purchased and rebuilt by the US Navy in 1861 and decommissioned in 1870
- USS Mercury (ID-3012) was originally the German SS Barbarossa seized by the US Navy and used to ferry troops during World War I
- USS Mercury (AK-42) was acquired by the US Navy 20 June 1941 and decommissioned 28 May 1959
- USNS Mercury (T-AGM-21) was a missile range instrumentation ship acquired by MSTS in 1965.
