= Mercury (1806 ship) =

History

United Kingdom
- Name: Mercury
- Builder: Hudson & Bacon
- Launched: 1806
- Fate: Sold 1822

General characteristics
- Tons burthen: 277, or 280 (bm)

Mercury was launched at Calcutta in 1806.

On 5 April 1807 Mercury Packet, Taylor, master, arrived at Falmouth. She had left Bengal on 24 November 1806 and St Helena on 5 February 1806. (Note: The British Library attributes this voyage to the 1786 Mercury and does not name the master. However, that vessel had been lost in 1802.) Mercury Packet arrived at Gravesend on 13 April. She sailed for India on 12 April.

In 1819 her owners were Fairlie & Co., and her master was J.J.R.Bowman. In November 1818 the British East India Company's (EIC) hired armed ship Mercury, Captain John James Robson Bowman, sailed with the expedition to the Straits of Malacca under Stamford Raffles. (Note: The rest of the expedition consisted of Indiana (Captain James Pearl, with Raffles on board), Ganges (Captain Francis Jame Bernard), Nearchus (Lieutenant William Maxwell), and schooner Enterprise (Captain Richard Harris). Ganges, of 130 tons, and Enterprise, of 85 tons, were both vessels registered at Prince of Wales Island (Penang). By some accounts the HCS Discovery, and HCS Investigator were part of the expedition; other accounts do not mention them but do mention the HCS Minto (Lieutenant Griddle). Minto and Nearchus were EIC survey vessels.) She then participated in the occupation of Singapore. Her charter expired in February 1819. Mercury was sold at Java in 1822.
