= Blackburn Mercury =

Mercury
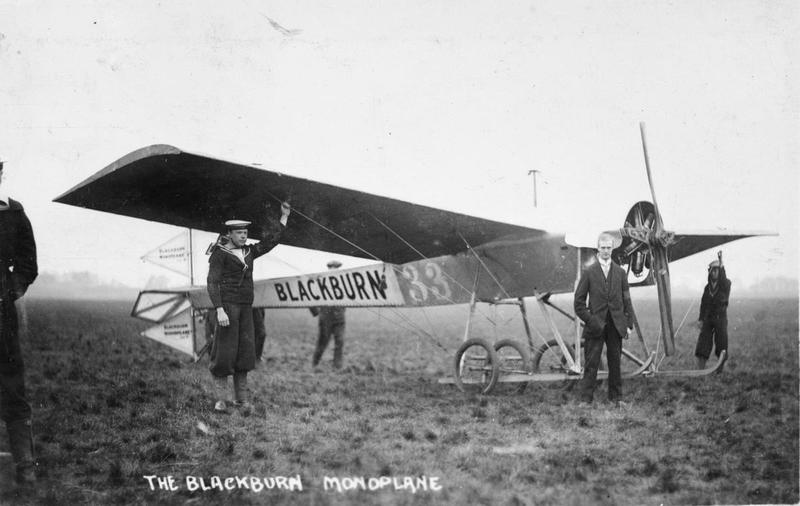
- A Mercury at Hendon, 1912

General information
- Type: Trainer
- Manufacturer: Blackburn Aeroplane Company
- Designer: Robert Blackburn
- Number built: 9

History
- First flight: 17 May 1911
- Developed from: Blackburn Second Monoplane

The Blackburn Mercury was an early British aircraft designed as a pilot trainer for the Blackburn Flying School, Filey, in 1911. It was an enlarged, two-seat version of the Second Monoplane that flew earlier that year. It was a mid-wing monoplane of conventional configuration that accommodated pilot and student in tandem, open cockpits. This prototype was displayed at the Olympia Aero Show in March 1911, and led to orders being placed for two racers to participate in the Daily Mail Circuit of Britain race. The first of these crashed on takeoff, and the second was first rebuilt into a two-seat trainer, then into a single-seat trainer known as the Type B. Another six Mercuries were built for various private buyers.

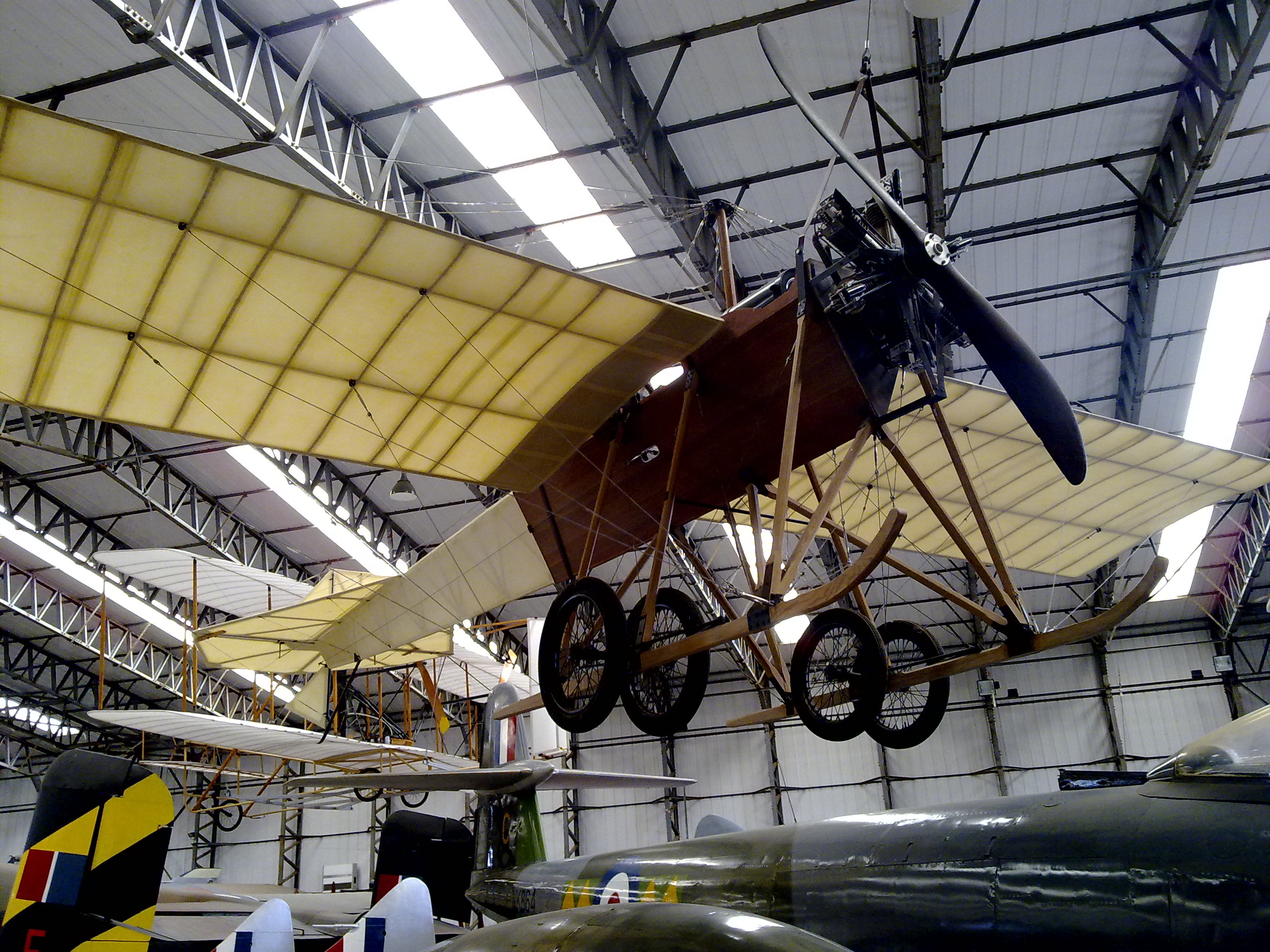
Replica at the Yorkshire Air Museum

A full-scale non-flying replica of Mercury II configuration was constructed for the Yorkshire Television series Flambards and is now displayed at the Yorkshire Air Museum.

== Variants ==
- Mercury I – two-seat prototype powered by Isaacson engine (one built)
- Mercury II – single-seat racer version with Gnome rotary engine (two built)
  - Type B – one Mercury II converted to single-seat trainer
- Mercury III or Mercury Passenger Type – (six built) two-seaters powered by a variety of Isaacson, Gnome, Renault and Anzani engines

== Specifications (Mercury I) ==
Data from Blackburn aircraft since 1909

General characteristics

- Crew: 2
- Length: 33 ft 0 in (10.06 m)
- Wingspan: 38 ft 4 in (11.68 m)
- Height: 6 ft 9 in (2.06 m)
- Wing area: 288 sq ft (26.8 m^{2})
- Gross weight: 1,000 lb (454 kg)
- Powerplant: 1 × Isaacson 7-cylinder air-cooled radial piston engine, 50 hp (37 kW)
- Propellers: 2-bladed fixed-pitch propeller

Performance

- Maximum speed: 60 mph (97 km/h, 52 kn)
