= List of accidents and incidents involving military aircraft before 1925 =

This is a list of accidents and incidents involving military aircraft grouped by the year in which the accident or incident occurred. Not all of the aircraft were in operation at the time. For more exhaustive lists, see the Bureau of Aircraft Accidents Archives or the Aviation Safety Network or the Scramble on-line magazine accident database. Combat losses are not included except for a very few cases denoted by singular circumstances.

== Aircraft terminology ==
Information on aircraft gives the type, and if available, the serial number of the operator in italics, the constructors number, also known as the manufacturer's serial number (c/n), exterior codes in apostrophes, nicknames (if any) in quotation marks, flight callsign in italics, and operating units.

== 1861 ==
21 July
Gen. Irvin McDowell requests that a balloon be brought to the front at the Battle of First Manassas, Centreville, Virginia. Mary Hoehling tells of the sudden appearance of Pennsylvania aeronaut John Wise who demanded that Prof. Thaddeus S. C. Lowe stop his inflating of his balloon "Enterprise" and let him inflate his balloon instead. Wise had legal papers upholding his purported authority. Although Wise's arrival on the scene was tardy, he did inflate his balloon and proceeded toward the battlefield. On the way the balloon became caught in the brush and was permanently disabled. His balloon became lodged in trees, which eventually tore the fabric. This ended Wise's bid for the position, and Lowe was at last unencumbered from taking up the task as Chief Aeronaut of the U.S. Army. "Lowe helped avoid panic after the First Battle of Manassas by ascending to a height of 3 miles and reporting that no Confederate forces were advancing on Washington."

== 1895 ==
4 July
A large German military balloon burst at the German Army's Balloon Department grounds. Five balloonists were injured.

== 1907 ==
28 May
Lieuts. Theodore E. Martin-Leake, 28, and William T. M'Clintock Caulfield, 27, of the British Army ascend at 1630 hrs. from the military balloon factory at Cove, near Aldershot, in the balloon Thresher, witnessed by King Edward VII and Prince Fushimi Hiroyasu. For unknown reasons they do not descend a few hours later as planned, and the balloon is sighted over Weymouth at 2030 hrs., drifting towards the sea. The crew drown when the balloon crashes in Lyme Bay. The trawler Skylark (Captain Johnson) discovers the partially submerged balloon 10 miles (16 km) off Exmouth on 29 May and after some difficulty brings it into Brixham where it is transferred to the custody of Customs officials. Caulfield's body recovered at Weymouth on 24 June. Leake's body never found.

2 June
Captain of the Military Engineers Arnaldo Ulivelli's balloon departs from Ponte Milvio but is hit by lightning while flying above a military parade in Rome. He suffers from broken bones and burns as his balloon falls from 500 metres (1,600 ft), crashes on the Via Cassia, not far from the intersection with Via della Camilluccia, and dies four hours later in San Giacomo Hospital. A stone memorial has been erected at the crash site.

22 June
A military balloon falls and explodes in Debrecen, Austria-Hungary. Its crew of two French Army officers and one Austro-Hungarian Army officer, and ten peasant men on the ground are killed. With thirteen fatalities it was the worst air accident until the 1913 Helgoland Island Air Disaster.

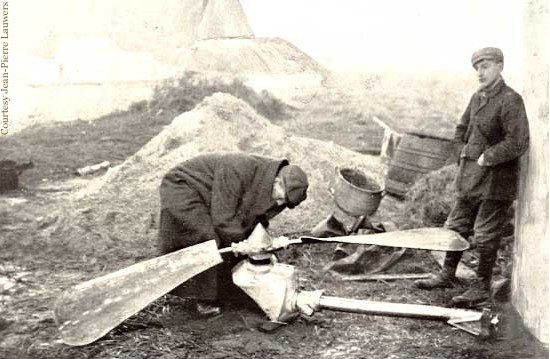
Propeller and gear assembly knocked off Patrie during temporary landfall in Ballysallagh, Ireland on 1 December 1907

30 November
The French Army's first airship, Patrie, is torn loose from temporary moorings at Souhesmes during a storm. After briefly touching down in Ireland, it is last sighted near the Hebrides.

== 1908 ==
20 May
Brazilian Armed Forces officer Lt. Juventino Fonseca died from injuries sustained when his balloon prematurely took off during military inspection due to a gust of wind. As his balloon was still tethered, it crashed into the ground over Manaus.

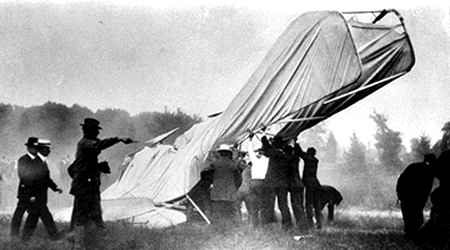
Wright Model A crash on Fort Myer parade ground. Photo by C. H. Claudy.

17 September
Wright Model A, piloted by Orville Wright, crashes at Fort Myer, Virginia, killing Lt. Thomas E. Selfridge. During the flight, which had begun soon after 5 pm, a propeller broke and severed control wires. The trials continued the following year with a new smaller version of the Wright A which became the first military aircraft when purchased by the US Army. This aircraft served for two years and was retired on 4 May 1911. It is now on display at the Smithsonian Institution National Air and Space Museum, Washington, D.C., after having been accepted for exhibition on 20 October 1911. Selfridge Air Force Base, Michigan, was later named for the first U.S. military aircrash victim. Wright was hospitalized until 31 October 1908 and spent several more weeks on crutches.
16 October
Pilot Samuel Franklin Cody takes off from Farnborough Common, Great Britain, in his British Army Aeroplane No 1, a biplane powered by a 50 hp (37 kW) Antoinette 8V engine. His flight covers 424 metres (1,391 ft) before ending in a crash-landing, which he survives.

== 1909 ==
16 May
A French military balloon collides with electric light wires and is destroyed by fire at Paris.

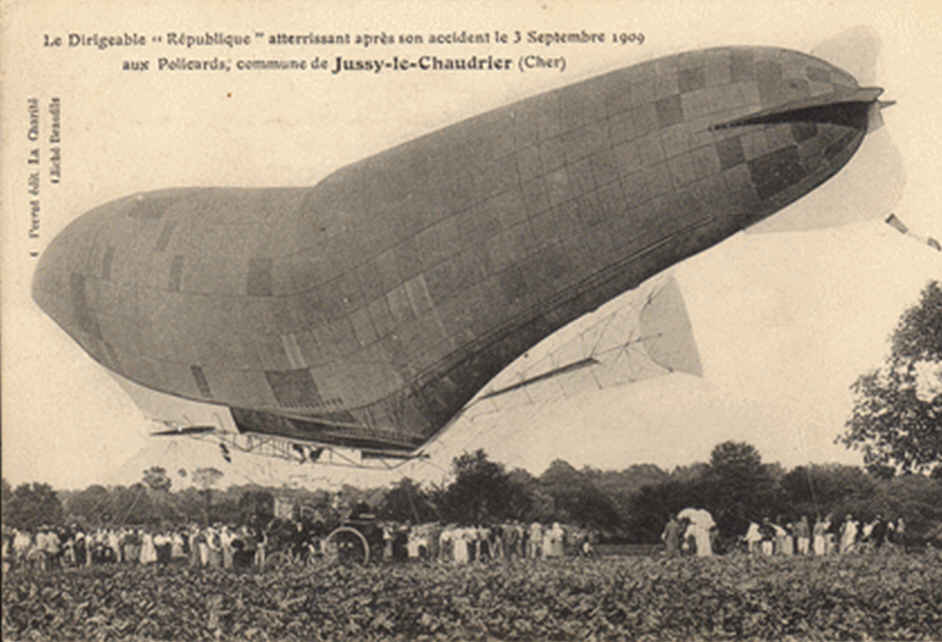
The damaged République prepares to land at Jussy-le-Chaudrier on 3 September 1909, after its engine overheated.

3 September
The French army airship La République sets off from Chalais-Meudon for a flight to Lapalisse. After 62 miles (105 km), while over La Charité-sur-Loire, the motor overheats due to poor water circulation and has to be stopped immediately, requiring the crew to land in poor conditions at Policards, in the commune of Jussy-le-Chaudrier. Some local farm workers who are present catch the guide ropes but are unable to prevent the gondola from impaling itself on an apple tree, which damages the airship’s keel and gondola in several places. With this damage and given the loss of a quantity of gas, it is decided not to risk the République suffering the same fate as the Patrie (which was lost when a storm blew up while she was moored in the open due to mechanical problems), but to deflate the gas-bag immediately. The gondola and keel are sent on to Lapalisse for repairs and the envelope returned for repairs to Chalais-Meudon.
22 September
Capt. Louis F. Ferber, (1862–1909), of the French Army, is killed when he drags a wing during a low-altitude turn in a Voisin biplane at a flying meet at Boulogne, France, overturning the machine. "Capt. Ferber was pinned to the ground."

25 September
French Army airship La République crashes over Avrilly, Allier, killing its crew of four. It was caused by a broken propeller which sheared through the envelope causing rapid leakage. This crash marks the first military airship fatalities.

31 October
Lieut. Pietro Rovetti is killed when struck by an airship propeller during takeoff in Rome.

5 November
The United States Army Wright Military Flyer, serial 1, piloted by Lieutenant Frank P. Lahm with 2nd Lieutenant Frederick E. Humphreys as passenger crashes into the ground at College Park Airport, Maryland, while executing a sharp right turn. The aircraft had lost altitude due to engine misfiring and the aircrew had not taken account of their proximity to the ground when banking the aircraft to the right. Both officers were unhurt but the aircraft required repairs. The skids and the right wing had to be replaced.

== 1910 ==
12 July
At the age of 32, Charles Rolls (of Rolls-Royce fame) was killed in an air crash at Hengistbury Airfield, Southbourne, Bournemouth when the tail of his Wright Flyer broke off during a flying display. He was the first Briton to be killed in an aeronautical accident with a powered aircraft, and the eleventh person internationally. His was also the first powered aviation fatality in the United Kingdom.

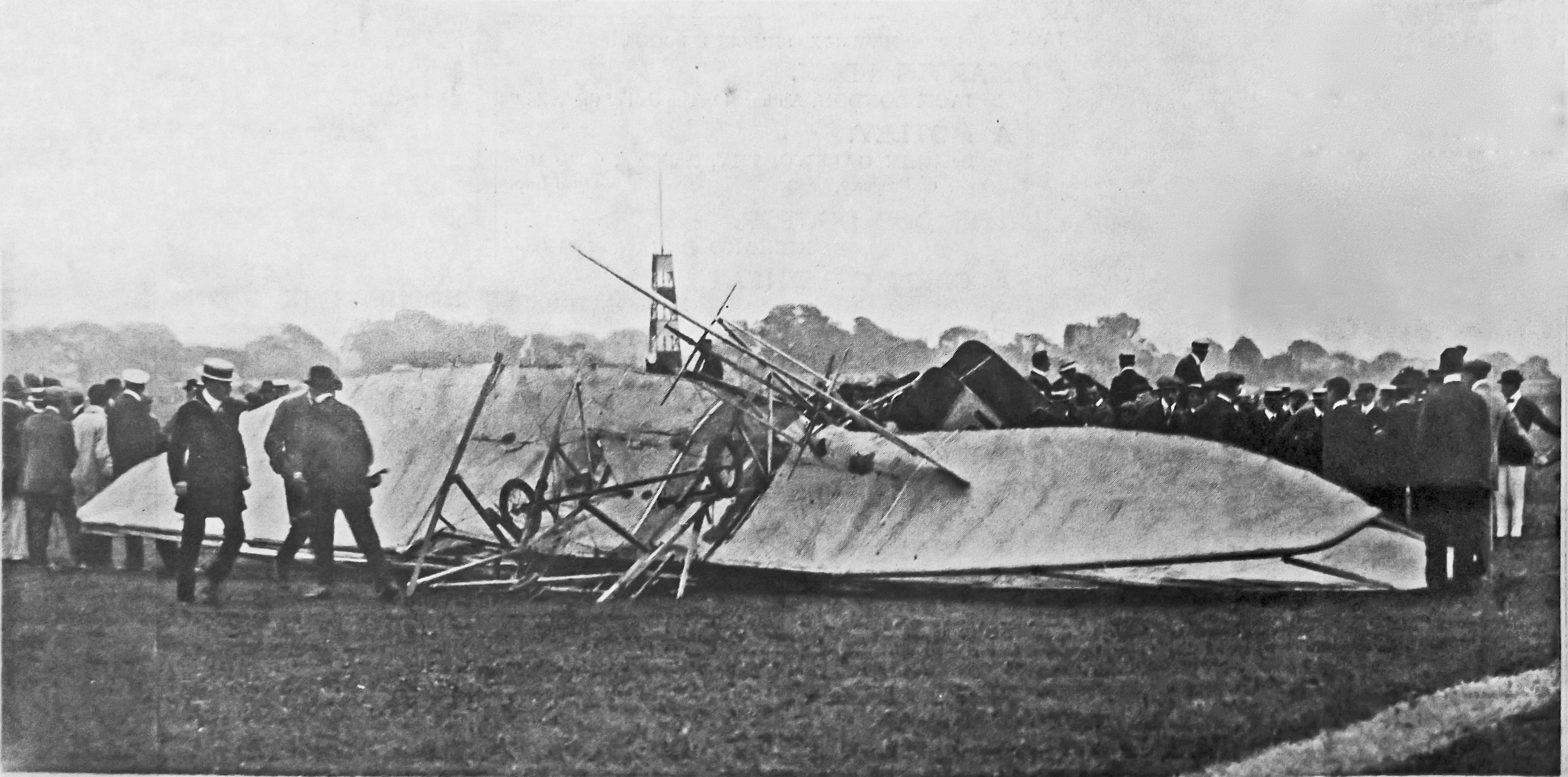
Death of Charles Stewart Rolls - Illustrated London News

20 August
Lt. Marquis Vivaldi (also quoted as Lt. Pasqua Vivaldi), of the Royal Italian Army, is killed at Magliano, near Rome, in a Farman biplane. "In descending he lost control." The 28 January 1911 issue of Flight states that the "Motor stopped and machine was smashed; he was killed instantly."

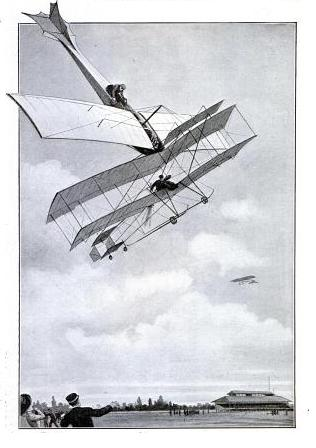
Artist's impression of the collision

3 October
The first recorded collision between aircraft occurs at the Milano Circuito Aereo Internazionale meet held in Milan, Italy, when René Thomas of France in an Antoinette monoplane collides with Captain Bertram Dickson of the British army, the first British serviceman to qualify as a pilot, in a Farman biplane by ramming him in the rear. Both pilots survive but Dickson is so badly injured he never flies again.

3 December
The first multiple fatality airplane accident in history happened at Centocelle, near Rome, when Lt. Enrico Cammarota and Private S. Castellani became the 26th and 27th people to die in an aircraft crash. Their Farman biplane broke during a turn and they died in a military hospital.
30 December
French aviator Lt. Jacques de Caumont, 28, is killed in the 50 hp prototype Nieuport III monoplane, at St. Cyr, this date, when he suffers loss of control.

== 1911 ==
10 May
First U.S. Army pilot casualty, 2nd Lt. George Edward Maurice Kelly (1878–1911), London-born, and a naturalized United States citizen in 1902, is killed when he banks his Curtiss Type IV (or Curtiss Model D), Army Signal Corps serial number 2, sharply to avoid plowing into an infantry encampment near the present site of Fort Sam Houston, Texas. The Aviation Camp (aka Remount Station) at Fort Sam Houston is renamed Camp Kelly, 11 June 1917, then Kelly Field on 30 July 1917, and finally Kelly AFB on 29 January 1948. Airframe rebuilt, finally grounded in February 1914, refurbished, and placed on display in the Smithsonian Institution National Air and Space Museum, Washington, D.C. Due to this crash, the commanding officer of Fort Sam Houston bans further training flights at the base, the flying facilities being moved to College Park Airport, College Park, Maryland in June–July 1911. A replica of this airframe is preserved at the National Museum of the United States Air Force.

18 August
The Royal Aircraft Factory S.E.1 crashes at Farnborough, pilot Lt. Theodore J. Ridge killed. Despite being Assistant Superintendent at the Factory, Ridge was an inexperienced pilot who had only been awarded his pilot's certificate the day before, and was described as "an absolutely indifferent flyer". The combination of an unskilled pilot and a marginally controllable aircraft proved fatal: the S.E.1 stalled in a turn and spun in, killing Ridge.

17 September
Lieutenant Reginald Archibald Cammell of the British Air Battalion was killed at Hendon while conducting a trial flight of an ASL Valkyrie Type B with his own engine fitted. The accident was not considered to be due to faults in the aircraft, but to have been caused by Cammell's lack of experience with the aircraft.

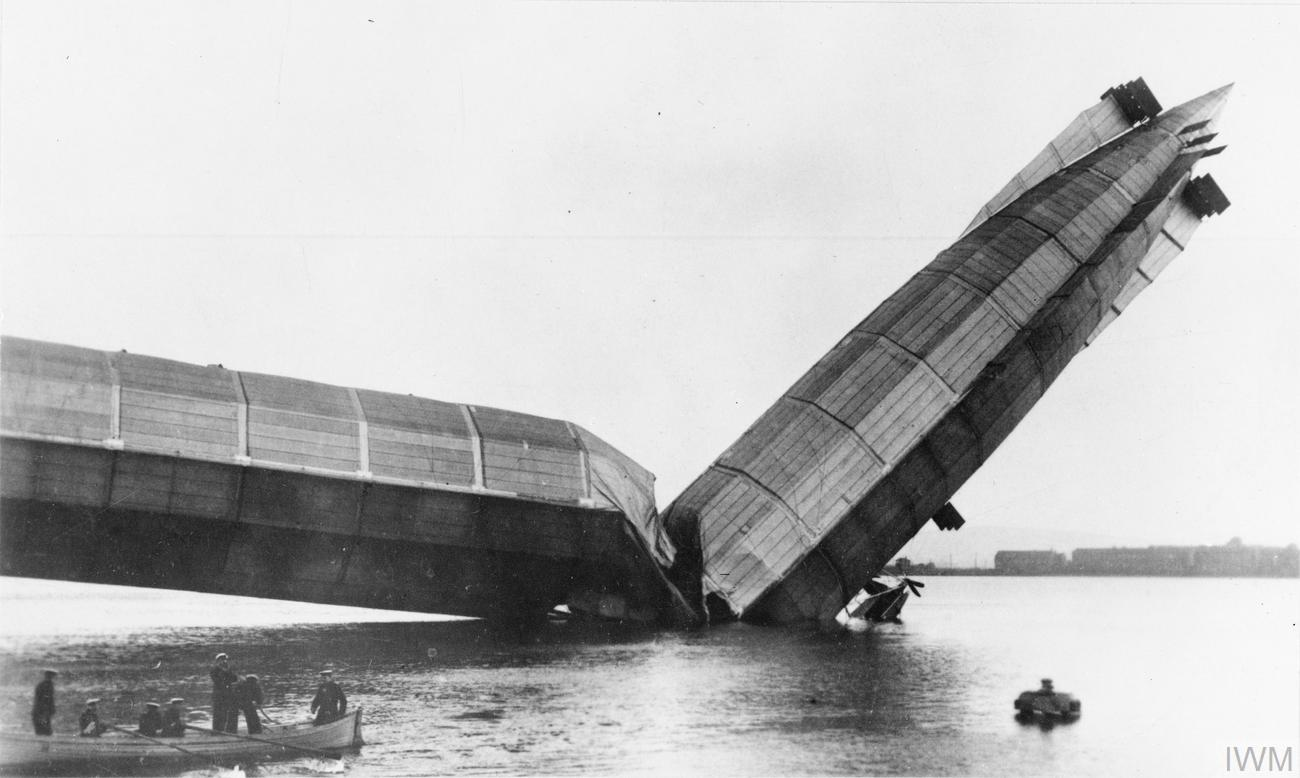
HMA No.1 after breaking its back

24 September
His Majesty's Airship No. 1, intended as a scout for the Royal Navy, known as the "Mayfly", but designated ‘HMA Hermione’ in public records because the naval contingent at Barrow were attached to HMS Hermione, a cruiser moored locally preparing to act as its tender, breaks in two in high winds as it is being removed from its shed at Cavendish Dock for full trials. The design is never flown.

18 November
First British seaplane to leave the water, and the first seaplane to take off from British waters, an Avro Type D, the first of six of the type, piloted by Royal Navy Commander Oliver Schwann, lifts off from Cavendish Dock, Barrow-in-Furness, England, briefly, falls back into the water and is damaged. His lack of training betrayed him, and the first take-off was not followed by the first successful landing. The Avro will be repaired.

== 1912 ==
24 May
Ten days after successfully demonstrating the third Jacob Goedecker-built Fokker Spin for an Imperial German Army delegation, Anthony Fokker crashes at the Johannisthal aerodrome, near Berlin, Germany, falling about 40 feet (12 m) when a wing bracing-wire breaks. Fokker is not hurt but his passenger Lt. von Schlichting is killed. Due to this accident, the hard wire bracing of the design is changed to a stranded cable. The Fokker M.1 through M.4 are developed for the German army from the Spin ("Spider").

1 June
Herr Buchstaetler and Lt. Stille of the German aviation corps are killed in a crash at Berlin, Germany, this date.

11 June
Lieutenant Leighton W. Hazelhurst Jr. (July 1887 – 11 June 1912) and Arthur L. Welsh (14 August 1881 – 11 June 1912) are killed in crash of Wright Model C, U.S. Army Signal Corps serial number 4, in College Park, Maryland. Hazelhurst was the third U.S. army officer to die in an aeroplane crash. Airframe had recently been purchased by the Aeronautical Division, U.S. Signal Corps. The United States Army Signal Corps had established a series of tests for the aircraft, and Welsh and Hazelhurst were taking the Model C on a climbing test, one of the last in the series required by the Army. Shortly after takeoff, the aircraft pitched over while making a turn and fell 30 feet (9.1 m) to the ground, killing both crew members. They had both been ejected from their seats, with Welsh suffering a crushed skull and Hazelhurst a broken neck. The New York Times described Welsh as "one of the most daring professional aviators in America" and his flying partner Hazelhurst as being among the "most promising of the younger aviators of the army". A board of officers was formed by the United States Secretary of War Henry Lewis Stimson, which concluded that Welsh was at fault in the crash, having risen to 150 feet (46 m), with the plan to dive at a 45-degree angle in order to gain momentum for a climb, but had made the dive too soon, with the board's results reported in 29 June 1912 issue of Scientific American. In a 2003 interview, a cousin of Welsh's reported the family's belief that the tests were run too rapidly and that Welsh was doomed to fail by carrying too much fuel and a passenger, giving a craft that would be unable to make the planned maneuver with the weight it was carrying. Hazelhurst Field, at Mineola, New York, a major World War I training facility, is named for the aviator.

19 June
Capt. Marcel Dubois and Lt. Albert Peignan of the French Army are killed near Douai when their planes collide in mid-air, the first fatal mid-air collision in history. Unable to see each other in early morning haze, while making circuits over the airfield, their two biplanes impacted and the wire stays and canvas wings became interlocked, the two planes coming down together. Peignan dies on striking the ground and Dubois expires within the hour.

26 June
2nd Lt. Henry H. Arnold, holder of Fédération Aéronautique Internationale (FAI) pilot certificate No. 29 and Military Aviator Certificate No. 2, after accepting the Army's first tractor airplane, Burgess Model H, Signal Corps 9, crashes into Plymouth Bay, Massachusetts after takeoff, receiving the scar on his chin that he shows distinctively for the rest of his life.

5 July
Royal Flying Corps (RFC) Captain Eustace Loraine and his observer Staff Sergeant Richard H V Wilson were flying a Nieuport monoplane out of Larkhill, Wiltshire, England on a routine training flight. They were executing a tight turn when the aircraft fell towards the ground and crashed. Wilson was killed outright and although Loraine was speedily transported to Bulford Hospital in a horse-drawn ambulance, he died of his injuries only a few minutes after arriving at the hospital. Loraine and Wilson were the first Flying Corps personnel to die in an aircraft crash while on duty. Later in the day an order was issued which stated "Flying will continue this evening as usual", thus beginning a British military aviation tradition.

31 July
An attempt by the U.S. Navy to catapult launch the Navy's first seaplane, a Curtiss A-3 (AH-3) pusher, at the Washington Navy Yard, Washington, D.C., fails when a crosswind catches the aircraft halfway along the catapult and tosses it into the Anacostia River. Pilot uninjured. A different source lists the location of the launch attempt as Annapolis, Maryland, the aircraft as the Curtiss A-1 (AH-1), and the pilot as Lt. Theodore G. Ellyson, noting that the catapult was powered by compressed air, was fabricated by the Naval Gun Factory at the Washington Navy Yard from a design by Capt. Washington I. Chambers, and that the aircraft, not being secured to the catapult, reared up at mid-stroke where it was caught by the crosswind. This account, from an official U.S. Navy history, may be the more credible of the two versions. An accompanying photo (No. 650864) dated July 1912 showing the A-1 on the catapult at Annapolis supports the latter description. The first successful launch was accomplished on 12 November 1912 at the Washington Navy Yard by Ellyson in the A-3, according to this source, possibly accounting for the confusion.

13 August
During air-ground maneuvers held by the U.S. Army, at Stratford, Connecticut, Pvt. Beckwith Havens of the 1st Company, Signal Corps, New York National Guard, suffers engine failure in a Curtiss biplane at about 1000 ft (300 m) over a crowded parade ground, narrowly misses spectators and a cavalry troop as he swoops down, glides down the field and collides with a Burgess-Wright biplane that had just been flown by Lt. Benjamin Foulois, breaking off its tail. No injuries reported, and both aircraft are taken to hangars for repair. Havens, a pilot employed by pioneer aircraft builder Glenn H. Curtiss, had enlisted in the New York National Guard as a private in June 1912. At the National Guard manoeuvers with the Army, he flew an aircraft that his employer had loaned him.

6 September
Capt. Patrick Hamilton and Lt. Wyness-Stuart of the Royal Flying Corps are killed when their Deperdussin monoplane breaks up in flight, crashing at Graveley, near Welwyn. The 60 hp (45 kW) Anzani-powered aircraft had been taken on strength by the army in January 1912.

10 September
Lts. E. Hotchkiss and C. A. Bettington are killed when their Bristol-Coanda monoplane suffers a structural failure and crashes. This second accident involving a Royal Flying Corps monoplane in five days causes Col. Seely, Secretary of State for War, to issue a ban on monoplanes on 14 September. The ban will be reversed five months later when technical studies show that monoplanes are no more dangerous than biplanes.

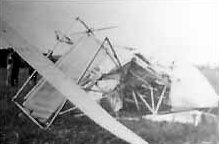
Wright Model B wreckage at College Park Airport.

28 September
Wright Model B, U.S. Army Signal Corps serial number 4, crashes at College Park Airport, Maryland, killing two crew, Lieutenant L. C. Rockwell and Corporal Frank S. Scott. On 20 July 1917, the Signal Corps Aviation School is named Rockwell Field in honor of 2nd Lt. Lewis C. Rockwell, killed in this crash, and Scott Field, Illinois is named for the first enlisted personnel killed in an aviation crash. Scott Air Force Base remains the only U.S. Air Force base named for an enlisted man.

== 1913 ==
February
Vickers E.F.B. 1 Destroyer (Experimental Fighting Biplane), the first of the Gunbus series of designs, contracted for in early 1913 by the Admiralty shortly after creation of the Naval Wing of the Royal Flying Corps in 1912, a pusher design, completed and displayed at the 1913 Olympia Aero Show, crashes soon afterwards, possibly on its first flight. No production ordered.

8 February
Russian pilot N. de Sackoff becomes the first pilot shot down in combat when his biplane, possibly a Maurice Farman MF.7, is hit by ground fire following bomb run on the walls of Fort Bizani during the First Balkan War. Flying for the Royal Greek Army, he comes down near small town of Preveza, on the coast N of the Aegean island of Lefkada, secures local Greek assistance, repairs aircraft and resumes flight back to base.

March
Royal Aircraft Factory B.S.1 (c.f. Blériot Scout, indicating a tractor aeroplane), the first aircraft in the world designed and built from the start as a single-engine, single-seat fighting scout, first flown in March 1913 by Geoffrey de Havilland, crashes later that same month from a flat spin, pilot suffering a broken jaw. Repaired and modified, but no production ordered. Rebuilt as the B.S.2, then redesignated S.E.2 (Scout Experimental), and with enlarged vertical tail surfaces as the S.E.2A, and given serial 609, but still no production ordered.

8 April
Lieutenants Rex Chandler and Lewis H. Brereton on training flight from North Island, San Diego, California, in Curtiss Model F flying boat, Signal Corps 15, with Brereton as pilot, crashes and Chandler is knocked unconscious and drowns. This was Chandler's first, and only, flight. Chandler, of the Coast Artillery Corps, had reported for aeronautical duty at the Signal Corps Aviation School on 15 March 1913. Chandler Field at Essington, Pennsylvania, opened in 1917, is named for the late pilot.

17 April
The French military balloon Zodiac collapses in flight over Noisy-le-Grand, France, killing five.

9 May
"By Associated Press to THE SUN KOENIGSBURG, Germany, May 9. - A German military spherical balloon, the "Cassiopeia," which ascended from this city on Wednesday, is missing with its passengers. It was last seen in the neighborhood of Pillau, about 35 miles from here, traversing the Frischen Ehrung [sic] peninsula in a storm." "It was under the command of Captain Von Wobeser of the second balloon battalion, stationed here."

9 May
"By Associated Press to THE SUN LOS ANGELES, May 9. - Within 40 miles of his goal Lieutenant Joseph D. Park, the army aviator, flying from San Diego to Los Angeles, met death at Olive, nine miles north of Santa Ana, this morning. He had lost his way in a mist a short time before and had landed. He soon recovered his bearings, and attempted to reascend, but the machine plunged against a tree and turned over, the engine crushing the head of the aviator. Little girls on their way to school were among the horrified spectators of the tragedy. Park was recently transferred from the fourteenth cavalry to the army aviation corps at San Diego." Park (1882–1913) was assigned to the 1st Aero Squadron. Park Field at Memphis, Tennessee, is named for him.

27 May
Lieutenant Desmond Arthur died when his Royal Aircraft Factory B.E.2 biplane, 205, collapsed without warning while flying over Montrose. This was Scotland's first fatal aircraft accident.

20 June
First fatality in U.S. Naval aviation occurs when flight instructor Ens. W.D. Billingsley, flying from the aviation encampment at Greenbury Point, Maryland, is thrown from pilot seat of the second Wright CH seaplane, B-2, at height of 1,600 feet in turbulent air over Annapolis, Maryland. Passenger Lt. John Henry Towers stays with airplane, sustaining injuries when it hits water. Design was modified conversion of Wright Model B with two pusher propellers driven through chains connected to a 60 hp (45 kW) Wright engine. Billingsley was Naval Aviator Number 9.

23 June
The S-21 Sikorsky Russky Vityaz ("Russian Knight"), designed by Igor Sikorsky and built by the RBVZ, a redesigned variant of the Bolshoi Baltiski, as the first large aircraft intended exclusively as a bomber, first flies on this date, the world's first four-motored aircraft. It is lost in a freak accident during 1913 military trials when the Gnôme rotary on a Moller II pusher biplane (some sources cite a Morane design) tears loose and hits the giant bomber.

17 July
Major Alexander William Hewetson of the 66th Battery Royal Field Artillery was killed flying near Stonehenge in Wiltshire. A stone memorial was erected near the spot. This can be seen by the road between the Stonehenge visitors' centre and the monument by the Fargo Wood.

4 September
U.S. Army 11th Cavalry 1st Lt. Moss Lee Love becomes the 10th fatality in U.S. army aviation history when his Wright Model C biplane crashes near San Diego, California during practice for his Military Aviator Test. On 19 October 1917, the newly-opened Dallas Love Field in Dallas, Texas is named in his honor. Joe Baugher lists the fatal aircraft accident for this date as being Burgess Model J, Signal Corps 18, which dove into the ground killing its pilot.

9 September
Imperial German Navy Zeppelin, L 1, LZ14, pushed down into the North Sea off Helgoland in a thunderstorm, drowning 14 crew members. This was the first Zeppelin incident in which fatalities occurred. Seven crew rescued by motor torpedo boats.

13 October
Imperial German Air Force-Lt. Koening {Aviator # 166} killed in crash near Neuendorf Aerodrome near Berlin. Lts Soren and Rohstadt are injured while taking a flight between Berlin and Stuttgart

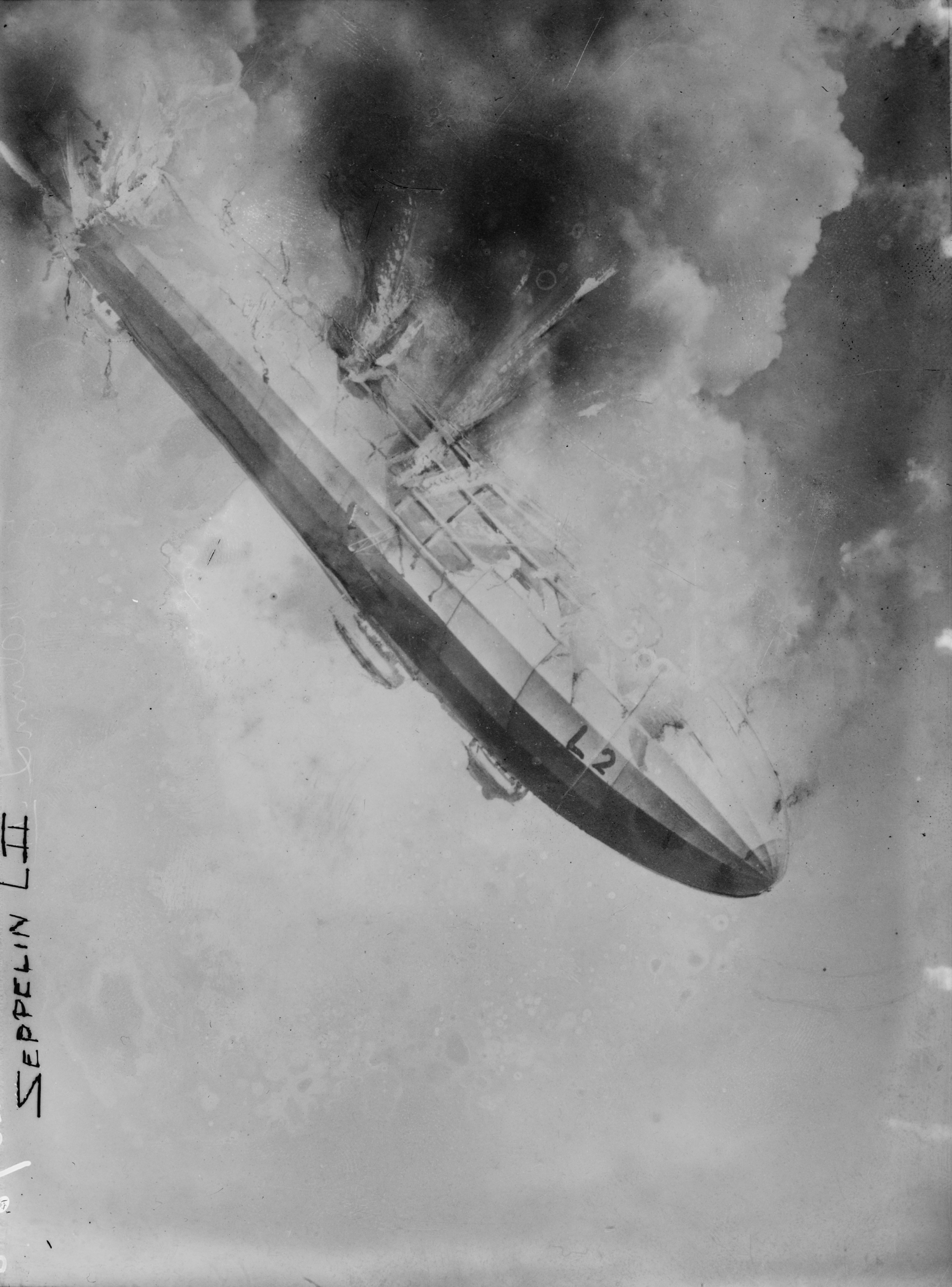
Painting of LZ18 descending in flames after engine fire, 17 October 1913.

17 October
Imperial German Navy Zeppelin L 2, LZ18, destroyed by an exploding engine during a test flight – the entire crew of 28 was killed.

14 November
Wright Model C, Signal Corps 12, stalls and crashes into Manila Bay, the Philippines, killing the pilot. One source identifies him as Loren Call, while another gives his name as Lt. Perry Rich. The Almanac and Year-Book for 1914 gives his name as Lt. C. Perry Rich.

24 November
Lieuts. Eric Lamar Ellington, chief instructor, and Hugh M. Kelly of the 1st Aero Squadron, United States Army Aviation Corps, are killed this date in a fall of about eighty feet in a Wright Model C, Signal Corps 14. The accident occurred at ~0758 hrs. across the bay from San Diego, California on the grounds of the army school on North Island. On impact, the engine broke free, crushing the two aviators. These were the eleventh and twelfth Army aviation casualties. "The front page of the San Diego Union was devoted to the details of the Ellington/Kelly crash, under the headline 'Intrepid Navigators of Air Crushed, Mangled to Death in Fall of Government Biplane,' with charges that the aviators were 'slaughtered' by a parsimonious government using antiquated machines." Ellington Field, Texas, which opens on 1 November 1917, is named for Lt. Ellington.

7 December
A Royal Aircraft Factory B.E.2a, 235, flown by factory test pilot Lt. Norman Spratt crashed at the Farnborough Aerodrome, pilot surviving.

== 1914 ==
9 February
U.S. Army Lt. Henry Post exceeds his previous altitude records by reaching 12,140 feet. During descent, the Wright Model C, Signal Corps 10, aircraft sustained damage (wing collapsed) and crashed into San Diego Bay, killing Lt. Post. On 24 February, due to a large number of accidents and deaths, an Army board at the Signal Corps, Aviation School, San Diego, condemned all pusher airplanes. This recommendation basically condemned all Wright aircraft, which were all pushers. Post Field is established at Fort Sill, Oklahoma, named for the aeronaut.

16 February
Lieutenant (jg) James M. Murray, Naval Aviator No. 10, on a flight at Pensacola, Florida, in the Burgess D-1 flying boat, crashes to the water from 200 feet and is drowned. This was the first flying fatality at Pensacola and it came only two weeks after flight operations began there. Flights were suspended for two days out of respect for the lost aviator. Of the first ten Naval aviators, half would die in crashes.

9 March
Lieutenant Alejandro Bello Silva was a Chilean aviator who disappeared during his qualifying flight for certification as a military pilot. In the pre-dawn hours, this date, Lieutenant Silva was in the Lo Espejo aerodrome, where he was to take an examination to earn the designation Military Pilot. Bello and two companions had to complete the circuit from Lo Espejo to Culitrín, to Cartagena, and back to Lo Espejo, in the central region of Chile, in order to pass the exam. On the first attempt, the aviators had to return to base due to near-zero visibility caused by heavy fog. Bello damaged his aircraft during the landing, and switched to an 80 horsepower (60 kW) Sánchez-Besa biplane (tail number 13, nicknamed "Manuel Rodríguez") for the second attempt. He took off together with one companion and the instructor, who had to make an emergency landing for refueling. Nevertheless, Bello continued his route and was lost among the clouds. He was never seen again and many searches over time have failed to find any trace of him or his aircraft.

12 May or 25 May
First fatal mid-air between two machines of the Royal Flying Corps kills Capt. Ernest Vincent Anderson and his passenger Air Mechanic Henry Wifred Carter when their Sopwith Tractor Biplane, 324, was accidentally rammed by Lt. C. W. Wilson in another Sopwith, 325, of the same type. Wilson was returning from Brooklands and descending to land at Farnborough when he struck the other plane, which was climbing away from the aerodrome on a familiarization flight. Wilson escapes with bruises and a broken jaw. Both planes crash on the nearby Aldershot Golf Course 10th Green. Both machines and all three airmen were from No. 5 Squadron, RFC.

4 June
First fatal British seaplane accident kills Lt. T. S. Cresswell and Cmdr. A. Rice of the Royal Navy. While ascending from the Calshot Air Station, the Short S.128 they are flying passes over motorboat on Southampton Water where Short's test pilot Gordon Bell and Lt. Spencer Grey are watching flight. At height of just over 200 feet, seaplane appears to break up and plummets into sea, killing both occupants. Some witnesses say that they believed that the seaplane stalled and that the wings folded up as structural limits were exceeded.

20 June
While the Austro-Hungarian airship Militärluftschiff III (or M.III) hovers over Fischamend testing new camera equipment, an Austro-Hungarian Army pilot tries to loop M.III in a Farman biplane. The airplane strikes the top of the airship, tearing a hole and igniting the escaping hydrogen gas. Both aircraft are destroyed, and both men in the airplane and all seven men aboard M.III are killed. It is the end of the Austro-Hungarian airship program.

26 June
The prototype Bristol S.S.A. (for Single-Seat Armoured), c.n. 219, a Henri Coanda single-seat tractor biplane design intended for production France, crashes on landing at Filton when an undercarriage bracing wire fails. Pilot Harry Busteed slightly injured, but airframe is severely damaged. The French authorities however agree to accept delivery of the type at the Breguet factory, where it is rebuilt, and Bristol takes no further part in its development.

27 June
During a training exercise close to the Belgium-Luxembourg border, Lt. Felix Liedel became the first Belgian Armed Forces aviation casualty. While piloting a Jero-Farman biplane, one of the tension cables became entangled in the propeller, resulting in his crash near Martelange. Liedel was mortally wounded, and died in a military hospital just after midnight the following day.

9 July
During an attempted take-off from Kiewit Airfield, Belgian Army lieutenants Raymond Hubert and Lucien Poot were involved in an air crash. When the wheels of their Jero-Farman biplane left the ground, the aircraft sharply turned to the right and crashed into a hangar at high speed. While Poot escaped with minor injuries, Hubert was mortally wounded, dying the following day.

26 July
Seventh aircraft erected at Tokorozawa Airfield, Japan, the Kaishiki Converted Type Mo (Maurice Farman Type), 7, crashed at this airfield while piloted by Capt. Yoshitoshi Tokugawa. When rebuilt, with completion on 19 January 1915, this 7th Type Mo 1913 became known as the Sawada Type No. 7, or more officially because of radical modifications, as the Kaishiki the 3rd Year Model.

12 August
Sole Royal Aircraft Factory S.E.4, registration 628, crash-lands at 1145 hrs. while being flown by Lt. Norman Spratt when one of the wheels collapsed, airframe overturning, sustaining such extensive damage that it is abandoned.

8 September
Imperial Russian Army pilot Pyotr Nesterov attempted an aerial ramming against an Austro-Hungarian reconnaissance Albatros B.II with his Morane-Saulnier. He most likely tried to hit it with his landing gear but accidentally used his propeller instead. As a result, both planes crashed killing Nesterov and the two in the opposing aircraft over Zhovkva, Ukraine.

5 October
First aerial combat kill in history recorded when a Voisin III pusher of Escadrille VB24, French Air Service, flown by Sgt. Joseph Frantz and Cpl. Louis Quénault, downed a German two-seater Aviatik B.II, 114/14, of FFA 18, flown by Feldwebel Willhelm Schlichting with Oberleutnant Fritz von Zangen as observer, over Jonchery, Reims, using what is believed to have been a Hotchkiss machine gun.

== 1915 ==
6 March
First fatal accident involving Imperial Japanese Navy Air Service aviators occurs when Yokosho Navy Type Mo Large Seaplane (Maurice Farman 1914 Seaplane), serial number 15, crashed at sea with Sub-Lieuts. Tozaburo Adachi and Takao Takerube, and W/O 3/c Hisanojo Yanase on board, all KWF.

1 May
Air Mechanic William Thomas James McCudden of the Royal Flying Corps the elder brother of James McCudden VC died when his Bleriot had engine trouble and crashed on 1 May 1915 at Fort Grange, Gosport.

8 May
Lieutenant (jg) Melvin L. Stolz, student aviator, is killed in a crash of the AH-9 hydroaeroplane at Pensacola, Florida.
3 August
The German Main Headquarters communique released in Amsterdam this date, and reported by Reuters, states that "A French captive balloon, which was torn from its anchorage during a thunderstorm, was caught by us north-west of Etain."

12 September
A Royal Naval Air Service Short S.38, 65, and a Caudron G.III, 3282, collide at Eastchurch, both pilots killed.

17 November
Imperial German Navy Zeppelin LZ52, L 18, destroyed in shed fire at Tondern during refilling.

== 1916 ==
22 March
Soldato Pilot Amico of 71 Squadriglia, Regio Esercito, was killed when he stalled his Nieuport X, 1452, and crashed near Cascina Farello, Italy.
7 June
Sergente Gefli of 71 Squadriglia, Regio Esercito, was killed when his Nieuport collided with another Nieuport during simulated combat and crashed near Villaverla, Italy.
9 June
Lt.j.g. Richard Caswell Saufley of the U.S. Navy, designated Naval Aviator No. 14, is killed in the crash of a Curtiss Model E hydro-plane (seaplane), AH-8, over Santa Rosa Island near Pensacola, Florida at the 8 hr., 51 min. mark of an attempted long-duration flight. Saufley Field, north of NAS Pensacola, is subsequently named for him.

18 June
German ace Max Immelmann (17 victories) is killed at ~2215 hrs. when his Fokker E.III monoplane, 246-16, crashes after breaking up in the air when the interrupter gear malfunctions and he shoots away his own propeller. He had been engaging an F.E.2b piloted by 2nd Lt. G. R. Gubbin with Cpl. J. H. Waller as gunner. Gubbin and Waller were credited with the victory, but another theory posits that Immelmann may have taken hits from friendly AAA, as the propeller failure would not necessarily have caused the complete airframe disintegration that occurred.

Afternoon of 27 June
Fokker's chief designer and test pilot Martin Kreutzer takes a Fokker D.I for a test flight, but when he kicks the rudder hard over, it jams and he is severely injured in the subsequent crash, dying in hospital the next day.

3 September
Imperial German Army Zeppelin LZ86, LZ56, crashed when the fore and aft nacelles broke away from the ship's hull after a raid.

Night of 6 September
The Roland (Luftfahrzeug Gesellschaft mbH, or LFG) Adlershof, Berlin, Germany, aircraft plant burns, destroying seven complete aircraft, including the prototype LFG Roland C.III (and only one built), as well as ten fuselages. Assembly jigs and fixtures, models and some drawings are salvaged and production resumes a week later in commandeered Automobile Exhibition Hall.

16 September
Two Imperial German Navy Zeppelins destroyed when L 6, LZ31, took fire during refilling of gas in its hangar at Fuhlsbüttel and burnt down together with L 9, LZ36.

21 September
One only prototype Avro 521 fighter, 1811, (a serial that duplicated one assigned to a Bleriot monoplane), assigned to Central Flying School Upavon, crashes killing pilot Lt. W. H. S. Garnett.

26 September
Flying ace Leutnant Max Ritter von Mulzer (ten aerial victories credited), the first Bavarian fighter ace, first Bavarian ace recipient of the Pour le Merite, and first Bavarian knighted for his exploits, on this date sideslips Albatros D.I 426/16 into a hard bank, loses control, and crashes at Armee Flug Park 6, Valenciennes, with fatal result.

28 October
Undercarriage of German fighter pilot Erwin Böhme, diving on a British fighter, strikes upper wing of ace Oswald Boelcke's Albatros D.II, also pursuing the same target. Fabric peels loose, aircraft disappears into cloud – when it emerges, the top wing is gone. Boelcke makes relatively "soft" landing, but as he habitually flew without a helmet, and in haste to take off had not properly secured his seatbelt, he was killed on impact. He was 25, and was credited with 40 victories. Jasta 2 is officially named "Jasta Boelcke" on 17 December 1916 in honour of its former commander.

7 November
Imperial German Army Zeppelin LZ90, LZ60, broke loose in the direction of the North Sea in a storm and never seen again.

8 November
Lieutenant Clarence K. Bronson, Naval Aviator No. 15, and Lieutenant Luther Welsh, on an experimental bomb test flight at Naval Proving Ground, Indian Head, Maryland, were instantly killed by the premature explosion of a bomb in their plane.

13 November
Sole prototype of the Zeppelin-Lindau (Dornier) V1, a single-seat, all-metal fighter with pod-type fuselage and pusher 160 hp (120 kW) Maybach Mb III engine, designed by Dipl-Ing Claudius Dornier, and built by the Abteilung 'Dornier' of the Luftschiffbau Zeppelin GmbH at Seemoos, near Friedrichshafen, attempts initial flight. After a series of ground hops in September by Bruno E. Schröter, this pilot refused to fly the prototype due to pronounced tail-heaviness. Oblt. Haller von Hallerstein, instead undertakes initial flight this date, but the V1 performs a loop immediately after take-off, crashing, killing pilot. No further development undertaken of the type.

12 December
Sole prototype of Kishi No.2 Tsurugi-go ("Sword" type) Aeroplane, 'II', single-engine pusher biplane, makes first and last flight when Lt. Inoue lifts off, immediately banks sharply to port, wingtip contacts ground, airframe cartwheels sustaining considerable damage. Cause of accident assumed to be due to the sweptback wing design.

28 December
Imperial German Navy Zeppelin LZ69 L 24, crashed into a wall while being "stabled", broke its back, and burned out together with L 17, LZ53.

29 December
Imperial German Navy Zeppelin LZ84 L 38, damaged beyond repair in a forced landing (due to heavy snowfall) during an attempted raid on Reval and Saint Petersburg.

== 1917 ==
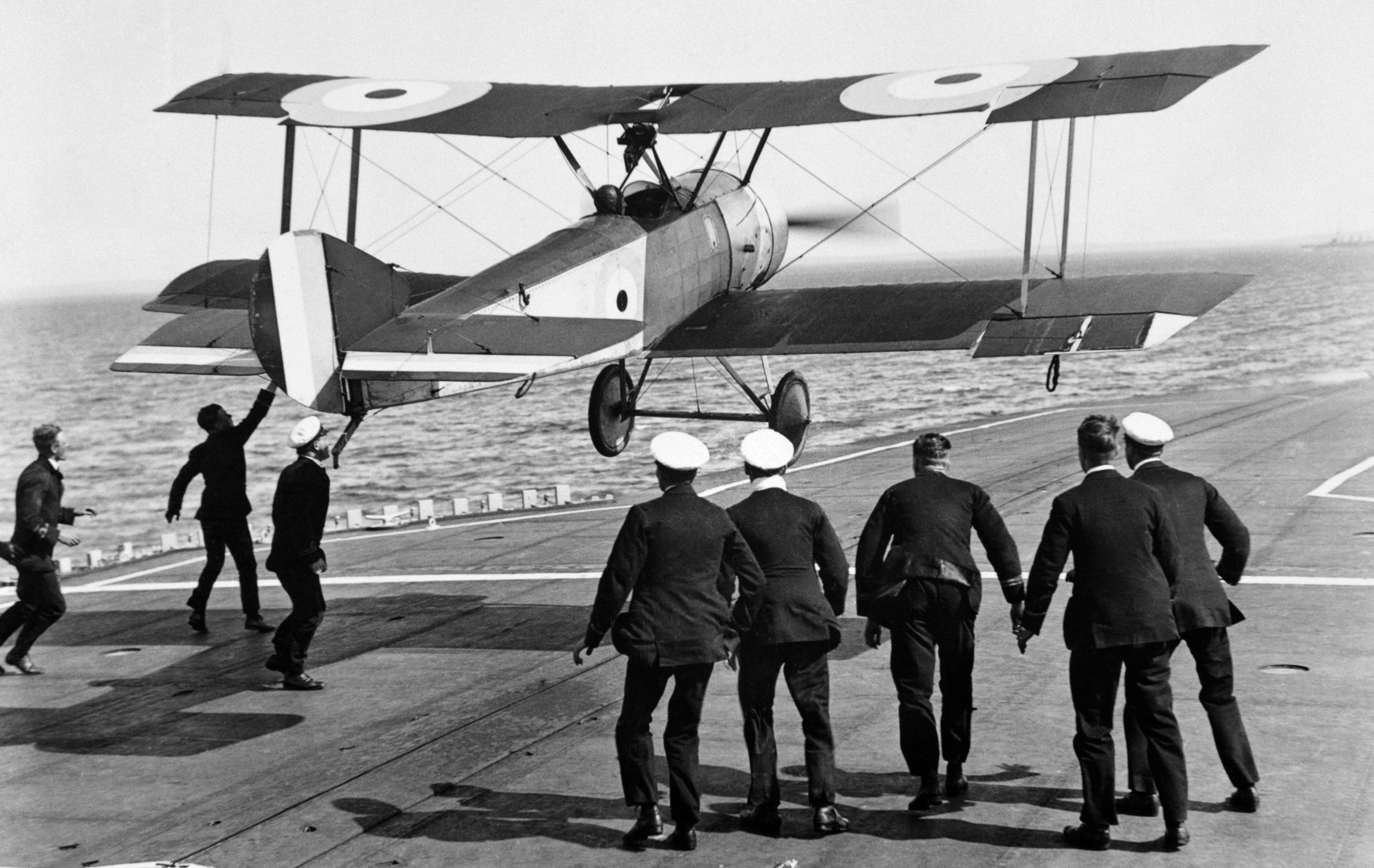
Sqn Cdr E. H. Dunning landing aboard HMS Furious in the Scapa Flow, in a Sopwith Pup, believed to have been N6453, 2 August 1917, five days before his fatal third attempt.

1 January
Five Royal Naval Air Service crew en route from Manston, England to Villacoublay, France in a Handley Page 0/100 bomber, run into clouds, lose their direction due to a compass fault, and land to ask directions. Unfortunately, they come down behind German lines at Chalandry, near Lâon, France, and before they can either burn the machine or take off, a German infantry patrol captures them and their intact bomber. An unconfirmed story states that Manfred von Richthofen flew this machine to 10,000 feet before the Kaiser at a later date. Another source cites 2 February as the date of this incident.
21 January
Sergente Menegoni of 71 Squadriglia, Regio Esercito, was killed when his Nieuport 11, 1622, suffered a structural failure of the wing struts and crashed.

28 January
Royal Aircraft Factory test pilot Maj. Frank W. Goodden is killed in the second prototype S.E.5, A4562 at RAE Farnborough, when it breaks up in flight. At the time of his death, Goodden was one of Britain's most experienced pilots. Inspection found that the wings had suffered failure in downward torsion. Plywood webs were added to the compression ribs, curing the trouble and were standardized on all later S.E.5s and 5a's.

7 February
Imperial German Navy Zeppelin LZ82 L 36, damaged during landing in fog at Rheden upon Aller and decommissioned.
12 March
Flight Sub-Lieutenant Ronald Victor Knight, Royal Naval Air Service, died at RAF Cranwell on 12 March 1917 where he was an assistant flying instructor. The engine of the plane in which he was flying failed and he dived to his death. He is buried in Wells Cemetery, Somerset and his name is shown on the war memorial in Wells.
26 March
Ex-Royal Flying Corps pilot J. B. Fitzsimmons is killed while engaging in some low level aerobatics in a high wind in the sole Nestler Scout (no serial) when the fabric began stripping from the wings. Fitzsimmons crashes into a hangar and the airframe is wrecked. No further development work takes place on the design.

June
During this month, six Russian Anatra D biplanes crash due to poor quality manufacturing, killing their pilots. The Russian aircraft builder was hampered by a shortage of high-quality wood and fabricated each wing spar in two pieces, overlapping at the joint by only 12 inches, held together with glue and tape.

16 June
Imperial German Navy Zeppelin L 40, LZ88, damaged beyond repair in a failed landing at Nordholz Airbase.

July
Even though Vickers already had experience in building promising tractor scouts, and the pusher-style Gunbus had been outmoded for two years in the presence of dedicated dogfighters, the company built one prototype Vickers F.B.25, powered by a 150-hp. direct-drive Hispano-Suiza engine in 1917, armed with one 1.59 inch Breech-Loading Vickers Q.F. Gun, Mk II (popularly known as the "Vickers Crayford rocket gun") in the nose as an anti-airship night fighter. A ten-inch searchlight was intended to be fitted in the extreme nose but there is no evidence that this was ever installed. Design underwent trials at Martlesham Heath in late June or early July, but crashed whilst landing in a strong wind, a trials report stating that due to poor controls, the aircraft proved to be "almost unmanageable in a wind over 20 mph". The serial of this aircraft is not known, although a document, traced recently, refers to it as No. "13", and it has been suggested that this may indicate A9813 – formerly a cancelled number intended for a Sopwith Triplane.

21 July
French test pilot/instructor Jean Robinet, awarded Aviator's Certificate No. 476 by the Aéro-Club de France on 29 April 1911, is KWF an Anatra D at the Anatra Factory, Odessa, Russia, this date.
2 August
"Captain Ralph L. Taylor, U. S. R., instructor of the Government Aviation Training School at Mineola, L. I., was killed when the military biplane under his control fell from a height of 800 feet, Aug. 2. Sergt. Thomas F. Pell, a student aviator with Captain Taylor, was injured." The Aviation Archeology database has no listing for this accident.

3 August
"When the motor of his airplane stopped 300 feet up and the machine fell during his first flight, C. B. Lambert of Welch, W. Va., a student at the West Virginia Aviation School at Beech Bottom, was killed August 3. E. L. Frey, a member of the British Royal Flying Corps, an instructor at the school, was accompanying Lambert and sustained serious injuries." The Aviation Archeology database has no listing for this accident.

7 August
Squadron Commander Edwin H. Dunning, RNAS, (17 July 1892 – 7 August 1917) during landing attempt aboard HMS Furious, Pennant number 47, in Sopwith Pup, N6452, decides to go around before touchdown, but Le Rhône rotary engine chokes, Pup stalls and falls into the water off the starboard bow. Pilot stunned, drowns in the 20 minutes before rescuers reach still-floating airframe. Dunning had made two previous successful landings on Furious, the first-ever aboard a moving vessel.

25 August
Sole Vickers F.B.26 Vampire, B1484, piloted by Vickers test pilot Harold Barnwell, crashes at Joyce Green, when he attempts a spin without sufficient altitude for recovery. Pilot KWF.

17 September
A kite balloon from the USS Huntington was hit by a squall and while being hauled down struck the water so hard that the observer, Lieutenant (jg) Henry W. Hoyt, was knocked out of the basket and caught underwater in the balloon rigging. As the balloon was pulled toward the ship, Patrick McGunigal, Ships Fitter First Class, (30 May 1876 – 19 January 1936) jumped overboard, cleared the tangle and put a line around Lieutenant Hoyt so that he could be hauled up on deck. For this act of heroism, McGunigal was later awarded the Medal of Honor, the first of the Great War. The Huntington was convoying six troopships across the Atlantic to France and the balloon observation was being made as it transited the war zone.

19 October
Imperial German Navy Zeppelin LZ50 L 16, damaged beyond repair in a forced landing near Brunsbüttel.

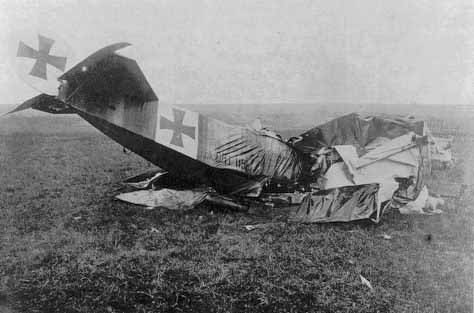
Fokker Dr.I 115/17 in which Gontermann crashed on 29 October 1917

29 October
Lt. Heinrich Gontermann, known as the Balloon Strafer, receives fatal injuries when the Fokker Dr.I 115/17, of Jasta 15, he is performing aerobatics over his airfield at 1,500 feet in, suffers structural failure as the top wing breaks up, crashes, suffers grievous facial injuries, dies the following day. The Triplane had been delivered to Jasta 15 on 22 October but foul weather kept it grounded until the 28th. Gontermann had scored 21 airplane kills and 18 balloons.

31 October
Fokker Dr.I 121/17, flown by Lt. Pastor from Jasta 11, one of the JG.1 units under Manfred von Richthofen, suffers structural failure and crashes. Second such crash in three days causes all Fokker Triplanes to be grounded immediately with affected flight crew reverting temporarily to Albatros D.Va and Pfalz D.III scouts. Accidents are investigated 2 November, reports issued 13 days later. Instructions for manufacturing and assembly improvements are implemented, production and flying resume 28 November.

22 November
A Tellier T.3 seaplane piloted by U.S. Navy Ensign Kenneth R. Smith, with Electrician's Mate Wilkinson and Machinist's Mate Brady on board, was forced down at sea on a flight out of NAS LeCroisic, France, to investigate the reported presence of German submarines south of Belle Isle. Two days later, and only minutes before their damaged aircraft sank, they were rescued by a French destroyer. It was the first armed patrol by a U.S. Naval Aviator in European waters. Smith was Naval Aviator No. 87.

December
Second prototype Sopwith Snipe, B9963, tricky to fly as its 230 hp (170 kW) Bentley BR2 rotary engine had immense torque that made directional control difficult, as well as being tail heavy while climbing, and nose heavy while diving, crashes, probably at RAE Farnborough, England. This airframe may have been a rebuild of B.R.1-engined prototype.

1 December
A Caproni Ca.4 bomber, c/n 5349, which arrived at Langley Field, Virginia, as part of a shipment of various Italian aircraft in September 1917, but whose erection was delayed by lack of an appropriate hangar, is finally readied for flight on this date. Upon takeoff, one motor fails and unable to maintain airspeed on the remaining two powerplants, the airframe piles up on the edge of the field. No injuries, but the airframe is a total loss.

12 December
North Sea class blimp N.S.5 sets off for RNAS East Fortune, but both engines fail within sight of her destination, and she drifts with the wind for about 10 miles (16 km) before they can be restarted. However, since both engines continue to be troublesome it is decided to make a "free balloon" landing, but the ship is damaged beyond repair during the attempt.

14 December

Coastal class airship C.26 of the British Royal Naval Air Service C26 was in search for airship C27 which had run into difficulties off the British coast. During the search, C26 had engine troubles. Due to disorientation of fog it flew in the direction of the Netherlands. To maintain altitude while flying over water, ballast and equipment was thrown overboard. When hitting the ground, three crew members jumped out of the airship, one was injured. The airship took off again and the final crew member was able to get out at Sliedrecht. The airship flew on without crew and destroyed many electricity wires and poles. It finally crashed onto a bakery in Eemnes.

== 1918 ==
Early 1918
Sole prototype of the Curtiss CB (Curtiss Battleplane), unofficially known as the "Liberty Battler", 34632, an experimental two-seat fighter developed and flown early in this year as a result of difficulties being experienced with the Liberty-engined version of the Bristol F2B, proves to have extremely poor handling characteristics and subsequently crashes early in its test programme. Three additional airframes, 34633-34635, cancelled.

5 January
Imperial German Navy Zeppelin, L 47, LZ87, destroyed by a giant explosion at the air base in Ahlhorn, along with L 46, LZ94, L 51, LZ97, and L 58, LZ105, and one non-Zeppelin-type airship, stabled in three adjacent hangars. This is supposed to have been an accident, though sabotage could not be ruled out.

7 February
During U.S. Navy tests of a converted Curtiss N-9 biplane as an unpiloted flying bomb, equipped with a Sperry automatic control, Lawrence Sperry takes it up to prove airworthiness of the design, crashes, but pilot unhurt.

13 February
"FORT WORTH, Tex., Feb 13. - Lieutenant Wray and Cadet Porter of the Canadian Royal Flying corps were killed at Hicks Field this afternoon when their machine fell to earth. Approximately forty aviators have been killed at the training field near here since the aviation camps were opened. Lieutenant Peyton C. March Jr., injured yesterday when his airplane fell at Hicks Field, died at 2 o'clock this afternoon, it was announced at the base hospital here."

Night of 7/8 March
Captain Henry Clifford Stroud (July 1893 – 7 March 1918) of No. 61 Squadron RFC, Rochford Aerodrome, Essex, flying an S.E.5a, B679, and Capt Alexander Bruce Kynoch (5 January 1894 – 7 March 1918) of No. 37 Squadron RFC in a Royal Aircraft Factory BE 12, C3208, out of Stow Maries Aerodrome, Essex, are killed in a midair collision over Shotgate about midnight. Kynoch took off at 2329 hrs. while Stroud took off at 2330 hrs., both attempting to intercept a German raider headed for London, but collided on a moonless night, both coming down in Dollymans Farm. Stroud is buried in the churchyard of St. Andrews Church in Rochford. Kynoch is buried in St. Pancras and Islington Cemetery in north London.

10 March
Sole prototype Nieuport B.N.1, C3484, operating out of Sutton's Farm, a home aerodrome, Great Britain, catches fire in the air and is destroyed. No further development undertaken.

13 March
"NORFOLK, Va., March 14. - Falling while 300 feet in the air in a seaplane, Ensign Leslie M. Macnaughton, U. S. N. R. F., was drowned and Cadet Malcolm Stevenson was slightly injured." "The plane was completely wrecked. It had not been determined tonight what caused the accident. MacNaughton's body was recovered soon after the accident by a navy craft. Stevenson was clinging to the wreckage, slightly stunned, but otherwise uninjured." Leslie Malcolm MacNaughton, Reserve Force (class 5), born 2 October 1894, was an undergraduate at Yale University, where he joined the Yale Flying Squadron (third Yale Unit). He left school to become a pilot during the World War, being designated Naval Aviator Number 330 on 28 January 1918, and was flying from Naval Air Station Hampton Roads.

14 March
"HUSTON, [sic] March 14. - Lieut. Marmaduke Earle of Louisburg, [sic] Pennsylvania, and Nile Gelwick of Findlay, Ohio, were killed at Ellington field [sic] today and Civilian Instructor Kaiser was seriously injured internally in falls in airplanes resulting from a tail spin. Both accidents were attributed to high wind which prevented the young fliers gaining control of the planes when they fell into the tail spin." The Aviation Archeology database lists pilot Miles W. Gelwicks as killed in Curtiss JN-4D, SC-25056, at Ellington Field this date, and M. M. Earle killed in an unknown airframe.

14 March
"FORT WORTH, March 14. - Lieut C. Finch of the Royal flying corps [sic] and Cadet Flier Howard P. Bittinger of the United States aviation corps were seriously injured here when the engine of their airplane stopped at an altitude of 500 feet and they fell at Camp Hicks." The Aviation Archeology database does not list this accident.

15 March
"SAN DIEGO, Cal., March 15. - Flying Cadet M. J. Lazelli had a narrow escape from death about noon today while on flight duty near Rockwell field.[sic] Lazelli, flying almost a mile high, was practicing trick evolutions and failed to come out of the drop known as the 'falling leaf.' The machine developed a tail spin and fell 4000 feet into the bay. Lazelli was rescued almost immediately after he struck the water, escaping with only slight bruises. The airplane was but slightly damaged."

18 March
"FORT WORTH, March 18. - Cadet Flier Ellis B. Watts was instantly killed and Capt. L. V. Drake was injured when their airplane fell 300 feet in a spinning nose dive. Cadet Watts' home was in Portland, Oregon." The Aviation Archeology database shows L. V. Drake as pilot of an unidentified airframe in an accident at Camp Everman, Texas.

18 March
"By Associated Press to THE SUN SAN DIEGO, March 18. - Flying Cadet Ralph T. Simpson, 27 years old, of Pasadena, was instantly killed this afternoon, when, emerging from a long nose dive in his airplane, he emerged from the dive upside down and fell to the water near North Island a distance of 100 feet. The machine landed on the cadet as he struck the water and was totally wrecked by the crash. Simpson's body was soon recovered and plans were made to send his body to Pasadena late tonight. Simpson was what is technically known as a second solo flier and had been making rapid progress in his training work. The accident was the first of the kind on record here. Simpson was the third cadet killed in practice work here, although Rockwell Field at North Island has turned out hundreds of young aviators in the last few months, their total length of flights being more than 50 times the circumferenece [sic] of the globe." Another report described the fall as being 1,500 feet, although this may refer to the length of the dive. It continued that Simpson was alone in the plane, and that he had only been at the aviation school for one month, having come from the preliminary training school at the University of California. The Aviation Archeology database shows Simpson crashing into San Diego Bay in Curtiss JN-4, SC-953, this date.

28 March
Sole prototype of the Breguet LE (Laboratoire Eiffel), a single-seat fighter monoplane, crashes on its second flight, out of Villacoublay, France, when it dives into the ground at full-throttle, killing pilot Jean Sauclière. Further development suspended.

4 April
Royal Flying Corps SPAD 12, S.449/B6877, equipped with engine No. 9253, crashes during flight from Martlesham Heath to the Isle of Grain. Records do not indicate any attempts to repair or replace the sole example of this model received by the RFC.

16 April
"HOUSTON, Tex., May 13. - Lieut. Benjamin V. Maurice, of New York, died at Ellington field [sic] today of injuries suffered when his airplane fell, April 16."

17 April
"By Associated Press to THE SUN HAMILTON, O., April 17. - Cadet Edward B. Bonynge of New Jersey, was instantly killed and his pilot seriously hurt in an airplane accident a mile from the Beamsville aviation camp today. Bonynge was to leave for overseas shortly. Bonynge came here from Washington, New Jersey. His parents lived in Santa Barbara, California."

17 April
Curtiss JN-4CAN "Jenny", SC-39997, of the Signal Corps Aviation School, Rockwell Field, North Island, San Diego, California, crashes into San Diego Bay. killing the pilot. "By Associated Press to THE SUN SAN DIEGO, April 17. - Second Lieut. Guinn W. Mattern, of Dayton, Ohio, was killed here today when the airplane in which he was practicing for his reserve military aviator license, went into a tail spin and fell 1,500 feet into San Diego bay. Neither machine nor the aviator's body had been recovered tonight." "SAN DIEGO, April 18 – Divers were still searching today for the body of Lieutenant Guinn W. Mattern, formerly of Dayton, Ohio, who fell to his death in San Diego bay late yesterday. Mattern, doing a tail spin, dropped 1500 feet into the bay channel and machine and aviator disappeared. He is the fourth aviation victim at North Island since the United States declared war." The Aviation Archeology database spells the pilot's name Gwynn W. Mattern.

24 April
"By Associated Press to THE SUN WICHITA FALLS, Tex., April 24. - Second Lieut. Stephen R. Warner, flying instructor of Maplewood, New Jersey, with Cadet Edwin D. Cryer of Allegheny, Pennsylvania, were killed two miles east of Call field, [sic] near here, this morning, when their plane, flying 50 feet above the ground, suddenly burst into flames and fell. Both bodies were badly burned." The Aviation Archaeology database lists Curtiss JN-4D, SC-1703, with Edwin Duncan Cryer as crew crashing near Call Field this date. However, Joe Baugher shows serial 1703 tying up to a Standard J-1, not a JN-4.

30 April
"By Associated Press to THE SUN WASHINGTON, May 9. - Edward Augustus Smith Jr., of Baltimore, of the navy aviation service, was killed April 30 in an airplane accident in France, the navy department announced today." The Library of Congress lists Edward Augustus Smith Jr., Quartermaster lc aviation, as killed this date. His remains were not recovered.

1 May
"By Associated Press to THE SUN DAYTON, O., May 1. - Lloyd Allen, aged 24, of New York city, [sic] a cadet flyer at the Wilbur Wright aviation field met instant death today when his machine became unmanageable while making a practice flight and crashed into a school building." The Aviation Archaeology database lists Curtiss JN-4A, SC-1500, of the Signal Corps Aviation School, flown by Lloyd S. Allen, crashing this date, confirmed by Joe Baugher.

2 May
de Havilland DH.4M, AS-32084, during test flight of the Liberty engine by Major Oscar A. Brindley, "the Army's most experienced pilot", and Lt. Col. Henry J. Damm, out of McCook Field, Dayton, Ohio, takes off at maximum weight, stalls before clearing "the small maple trees that bordered the field and crashed to the ground before the eyes of horrified witnesses. Maj. Brindley died instantly, and Lt. Col. Damm passed away on the trip to the hospital." The cause was found to be a spark plug that "had jammed itself between the wing's trailing edge and aileron, making it impossible for Brindley to control the craft." A period wire service item lists the accident site as occurring at the Dayton-Wright Company airfield at Morain City [sic], the location of that firm's plant 1, their main factory. Both officers had recently come from Washington, D.C., and according to a news account their plane fell ~400 feet. Damm had served as commanding officer at the North Island aviation school at Rockwell Field until 1 February 1918. Brindley, "before entering the army, was a civilian instructor at North Island. He was detailed by the war department to investigate a series of fatal accidents here [San Diego] and his recommendations resulted in the junking of a large number of army airplanes and the consequent falling off in the number of accidents."

2 May
"OMAHA, Neb., May 3. - Two Fort Omaha balloon school cadets were killed, 18 seriously injured, two probably fatally, and 25 others slightly burned when a big 35,000 cubic foot sausage balloon exploded in its hangar last night. The dead are believed to be Private John E. Davis and Vincent L. Beall. The two men were burned and charred beyond recognition. A lock of red hair on one escaped the flames and a silver ring on the other was not disfigured. Although Colonel Hersey's official statement said the explosion probably was caused by static electricity from the balloon's silken sides rubbing together, it is generally reported by witnesses that there were two explosions, started when gas was being transferred from a nurse balloon to the sausage in the hangar."

2 May
Lieut. James S. Ennis, of New York City and Cadet Paul Herriott, of Oakland, California, are killed when their airplane falls at Hicks Field, located 5.6 miles (9.0 km) NNW of Saginaw, Texas, "while doing a straight nose dive. They fell 150 feet." Herriott was formerly secretary to Senator Hiram Johnson of California, which post he resigned to enter the aviation service. The Aviation Archaeology database does not list this accident. Another news account lists the victim as James Ed Ennis, and notes that Herriott, under Johnson's administration as governor of California, "was a member of the state board of control. He was a newspaper man and was widely known throughout the state."

2 May
"EL CENTRO, May 3. - Unable to right himself from a nose dive a cadet flyer from the North Island Aviation school, whose name was withheld, landed in a heap near the Coyote mountains in this county, late last night and sustained a sprained ankle. With considerable pluck the aviator crawled on his hands and knees to the San Diego and Arizona railway grading camp, two miles distant, where he received medical attention. Early today assistants from North Island, together with a captain, arrived here and attempting to land after flying the machine from the mountains the captain who was piloting the machine, came to grief by smashing into the brush, breaking one wing. He, however, escaped unhurt. A truck later transported the broken plane to San Diego". The Aviation Archaeology database has no listing for this accident.

3 May
"SAN DIEGO, May 3. - Flying Cadet Nicholas C. Healy was instanttly [sic] killed and Cadet Hanley sustained a broken ankle as a result of an airplane accident near La Jolla at 4:50 o'clock this afternoon. According to reports from La Jolla, the airplane fell in a spinning nose dive from an altitude of about 500 feet after the cadets had made a forced landing for some unknown reason, and started up again.. [sic] O'Hanley hails from Garden City, Long Island." Myron Emmett O'Hanley and Nicholas C. Healy are listed as the crew of Curtiss JN-4D, SC-978, of the Signal Corps Aviation School, Rockwell Field, which suffered a stall / spin and crashed near La Jolla this date, by the Aviation Archaeology database.

4 May
"By Associated Press to THE SUN BABYLON, N. Y., May 4. - Ensign Spencer T. Alden of Fort Wayne, Indiana, wask illed [sic] and Philip P. Mooser, student aviator of Boston, was seriously injured when a naval hydro-airplane which they were operating, 'side-slipped' 500 feet and fell into Great South bay [sic] near Fire Island inlet today." "BAY SHORE, L. I., 4 May. - One aviator was killed and another seriously injured when a naval hydro-aeroplane 'side-slipped' and fell 300 feet into Great South Bay, near Bay Shore today. Ensign Spencer T. Alden, aged 25 years, a flying instructor, whose home is at Fort Wayne, Ind., was killed. His skull was crushed. Phillip P. Mooser, aged 24, of Boston, a student aviator, is suffering from a fractured skull and other injuries. Mooser was pulled out of the wreckage within three minutes and the prompt use of a pulmotor saved his life. Alden's body was not recovered until minutes later. Alden's father was at the stattion [sic] here when his son's body was brought in. He and Mrs. Alden arrived here yesterday to visit their son."

4 May
"By Associated Press to THE SUN ARCADIA, Fla., May 4. - Lieut. S. T. Valentine of New York city, [sic] attached to the army aviation school near here, was killed instantly today when the airplane in which he was flying fell approximately 2000 feet."

5 May
"NEW YORK, May 9. - Two naval aviators who disappeared off the Florida coast May 5 arrived here today aboard an American steamer. They were: Lieutenant Arthur Laverents of Cheyenne, Wyo.(;) O. C. Cotton, mechanician. They had been picked up after nearly 30 hours of battling for their lives on a stormy sea that threatened to wreck their hydro-aeroplane. They were faint from hunger and the knowledge that the water was infested with sharks added to their mental agony. They were nearly 60 miles off shore when rescued."

8 May
"CAMP MILLS, HEMPSTEAD, L. I., May 8. - Cadet John D. Ervin, of West Point, Miss., was instantly killed and two other aviators were injured when two airplanes collided at Hempstead Plains today. Cadet R. E. Jeremy, who was in the machine with Ervin, was so seriously injured that he can only live a few hours. His home is at Emporia, Kansas. Cadet J. R. Vidmer, driver of the other airplane, had his left leg broken, and was otherwise injured. The two machines collided at high speed and fell two hundred feet. R. E. Jeremy was so seriously injured that he can only live a few hours. His home is at Emporia, Kansas." The Aviation Archaeology database shows Curtiss JN-4A or JN-4D, SC-1320, with the pilot listed as both Julian D. Vidmer and as J. W. Widmer, colliding with Curtiss JN-4A or JN-4D, SC-1329, flown by John B. Ervin, who is described as killed, seven miles from Mineola, New York. Joe Baugher shows 1320 and 1329 as delivered as JN-4As then converted to JN-4Ds.

9 May
"LAWTON, Okla., May 9. - Lieut. George Sherman, student officer at Post field school for aerial observers, was killed late today when an army airplane in which he was making a flight fell 300 feet. The pilot was only slightly injured." The Aviation Archaeology database lists George Leslie Sherman as being killed in the takeoff crash of a Curtiss JN-4H, serial unknown, due to engine failure, at Post Field, Fort Sill, Oklahoma, this date.

9 May
"By Associated Press to THE SUN SAN ANTONIO, May 9. - In an airplane accident six miles from here at 8 o'clock tonight one man was killed and another seriously injured. Authorities at the hospital at Fort Sam Houston where the injured man and the body of the dead airman were taken, refused to make public their names." The Aviation Archaeology database lists no accident in the San Antonio area for this date, or by this news item's dateline, although an accident at Kelly Field, Texas, is shown occurring on 10 May.

9 May
U.S. Army Maj. Harold Melville Clark accomplishes first three-island flight in the Hawaiian Islands when he and mechanic Sgt. Robert Gray depart from Fort Kamehameha in a Curtiss R-6 of the 6th Aero Squadron, make a stop in Maui, and then continue to the island of Hawaii. Clark encounters fog and darkness over the island, causing him to crash in the jungle near Hilo. Two days after the crash, Clark and Gray emerge from the Hawaiian jungle unhurt. According to Harold Richards in "The History of Army Aviation in Hawaii", Clark accomplished another "first" on this flight as he had agreed to deliver two letters from Oahu residents to their relatives on Hawaii. After emerging from the jungle, Clark delivers the letters to their intended recipients. Thus, Clark carried the first letters by airmail in the Hawaiian Islands.

10 May or 11 May
"FORT WORTH, Tex., May 11. - Cadet Harry J. Myers failed to come out of a spinning nose dive with his airplane and is dead today after a plunge of 1200 feet to earth. Myers, whose home was in Bucyrus, O., had been training about two months." The Aviation Archaeology database lists Myers as crashing in Curtiss JN-4B, AS-824, at Taliaferro Field, Texas, on 10 May. This serial may be incorrect as it does not tie up to a JN-4B, according to Joe Baugher.

11 May
Curtiss JN-4HT, SC-38059, suffers a stall/spin condition after an engine failure and crashes at Ellington Field, Houston, Texas, killing pilot Louis Eddy Davis. "Says yesterday's Examiner: 'Lieutenant Louis E. Davis, who died at Houston, Texas, Friday from injuries sustained in a fall from his aeroplane Thursday, before the war used to spend his winters in California. His father, who is owner and editor of the Bloomington Pantograph, [sic] brought his son here as a youth to regain his health. The young man resided on his father's ranch near Santa Cruz, and was an occasional visitor to San Francisco. He married Miss Styletta Kane of Watsonville last August at the home of Mrs. Edward White, wife of the commissioner of immigration in this city.'"

14 May
"WITH THE AMERICAN ARMY IN FRANCE, May 14. - Falling through the clouds an American airplane crashed to earth two kilometers behind the American lines in the Toul sector late this afternoon, killing both the pilot and the observer." The Aviation Archaeology database lists a Sopwith, 5382, of the 2d Aviation Instruction Center, Mezieres, France, flown by B. C. Hopper, crashing after suffering a stall / spin condition this date. These two accounts may be the same accident.

14 May
"LONDON, May 22. - Second Lieut, H. W. Preston of the British air force, son of Robert K. Preston of Chicago, was killed on May 14 while flying in England."

16 May
"WASHINGTON, May 16. - The post-office department was informed that the postal plane which left New York today for Philadelphia, piloted by Lieut. Stephen Bonsat [sic] was smashed in making a landing at Bridgeton, New Jersey. The aviator was not hurt. The aviator, the message said, lost his way and in attempting a landing ran into a fence." Stephen Bonsal was one of the Army pilots selected by Major Reuben H. Fleet to initiate air mail service between New York and Washington, D.C. via Philadelphia beginning on 15 May 1918. Curtiss JN-4HMs were used at the outset.

16 May
"By Associated Press to THE SUN WASHINGTON, May 16. - Aviation accidents at American fields took a toll of 12 lives in the two weeks ending May 8, the war department reported today. Twenty-nine flying fields are now being operated by the army air service in the United States. Four other fields, Payne, Souther, March and Mather, will soon be opened for flying instruction, increasing the total to 33."

17 May
"New York, May 18 – Captain Antonio Silvio Resnati of the Royal Italian Flying Corps and pilot of several of the Caproni planes, was killed in a fall at Mineola Field yesterday. Improper judgement of his take-off speed, combined with a side-slip while at an altitude of about 50 ft. caused the fall. Captain Resnati was 25 years old and first came into prominence last September when he attained an altitude of 17,000 ft at Langley field. Later he made a flight from that field to Mineola carrying nine passengers in 4 hr. 2 min. Captain Resnati met his death on the eve of an attempt to fly across the Atlantic in a new giant Caproni which was being especially built for the trial." The Aviation Archaeology database confirms Resnati's crash in a Caproni at Hazelhurst Field. Resnati’s funeral is held in St. Patrick's Cathedral in New York City on 31 May, with Captain Hugo d'Annunzio and Sergeant Gian Felice Gino flying over in a Caproni from Hazelhurst Field, which drops flowers. Resnati was a native of Milan. His body is returned to Italy by sea.

19 May
First prototype Sopwith Salamander, E5429, crashes during test program while with No. 65 Squadron when the pilot has to avoid a tender crossing the aerodrome responding to another crash.

3 June
One Zeppelin-Staaken R.VI, a four-engined German biplane strategic bomber, modified as a float-equipped seaplane for the Marine-Fliegerabteilung (Imperial German Naval Air Service), with the designation Type L, serial 1432, using Maybach engines, first flown on 5 September 1917, crashes during testing on this date.

4 June
"MONTGOMERY, Ala., June 4. - Aviation Cadet George O. Mills of Jersey City, New Jersey, was killed late today when his plane caught fire and fell 2000 feet near Taylor field. [sic]" The Aviation Archaeology database lists a crash by George Atles Mills in an unidentified airframe at Taylor Field this date.

4 June
"HOUSTON, Tex., June 4. - Private John Earner of Philadelphia was killed and Lieut. Elmer N. May slightly injured today at Ellington field [sic] when their airplane became unmanageable in the air and crashed to the ground." The Aviation Archaeology database lists Curtiss JN-4D, AS-2941, piloted by May, as stalling and spinning into the ground 4 miles W of LaPorte, Texas.

4 June
"SAN ANTONIO, Tex., June 4. - Second Lieut. Joseph John O'Mally, age 26, of Albany, Missouri, was instantly killed here today when his airplane went into a tail spin and could not be righted. A companion whose name was not disclosed by the authorities, escaped unhurt." The Aviation Archaeology database lists Curtiss JN-4D, SC-3255, flown by Joseph John O'Malley, as spinning in at Brooks Field this date.

4 June
The Aviation Archaeology database lists Curtiss JN-4D, SC-3300, flown by Warren C. Shankle, as crashing at Brooks Field, Texas, this date, after a stall/spin. The accident was non-fatal.

4 June
"By Associated Press to THE SUN SAN DIEGO, June 4. - Civilian Instructor Stanley Coyle, 27 years old, Coudersport, Pennsylvania, and Flying Cadet Elwyn Chapman, 27, of Brookline, Massachusetts, were killed today when the airplane in which they were flying grazed another machine about 200 feet above Rockwell field, [sic] North Island, and fell into a spinning nose dive to the ground. Both machines were nearing the landing place when the accident occurred. Coyle's airplane crashed to the earth, while the other, driven by a lieutenant, managed to glide safely. Chapman suffered fractures of both legs, his left arm and his jaw. He was taken to the hospital at Fort Rosecrans. The young cadet died in the hospital early this evening." Stanley V. Coyle was flying Curtiss JN-4D, Field No. 234, when he struck JN-4D, Field No. 154, piloted by J. E. Read.

8 June
First prototype Handley Page V/1500 bomber, E4104, powered by tandem pairs of Rolls-Royce Eagle engines, first flown on 22 May 1918, crashes on thirteenth flight while piloted by Capt. Vernon E. G. Busby when all four engines quit at 1,000 feet altitude (300 m), possibly due to fuel starvation. Pilot attempts turn back to airfield but stalls and spins in. Four riding in the forward fuselage are killed on impact, two in rear rescued before airframe is consumed by fire, but one dies later of injuries. As aircraft was destroyed by post-crash fire, no determination could be made of cause of accident. Although two V/1500s of 166 Squadron are ready for a mission on 8 November 1918, bad weather cancels raid, and with the armistice signed on 11 November 1918 the type never flies operationally.

19 June
Lt. Frank Stuart Patterson, son and nephew of the co-founders of National Cash Register, is killed in the crash of his DH.4M, AS-32098, at Wilbur Wright Field during a flight test of a new mechanism for synchronizing machine gun and propeller, when a tie rod breaks during a dive from 15,000 feet (4,600 m), causing the wings to separate from the aircraft. Wishing to recognize the contributions of the Patterson family (owners of NCR) the area of Wright Field east of Huffman Dam (including Wilbur Wright Field, Fairfield Air Depot, and the Huffman Prairie) is renamed Patterson Field on 6 July 1931, in honor of Lt. Patterson.

19 June
"FORT WORTH, Tex., June 19. - Lieut. H. C. Kelly, flying instructor at Benbrook, was killed this afternoon in a crash. The cadet he was instructing escaped uninjured." The Aviation Archaeology database lists Curtiss JN-4D, Field No. 118, flown by Harold Clifford Kelly, from Carruthers Field, crashing 3.5 miles NE of the field.

20 June
"MEMPHIS, June 20. - Losing control of his airplane while attempting a landing, Cadet Flyer H. W. McClannahan, of Tennessee, fell several hundred feet at Park field, [sic], Millington, Tennessee, today and was killed. The Aviation Archaeology database lists Harvey H. McClanahan as crashing at Park Field in Curtiss JN-4A, serialled either SC-1593 or SC-1595, this date, while Joe Baugher identifies the airframe involved as 1595.

20 June
"MONTGOMERY, Ala., June 20. - Second Lieut. Halbert Clark, of Washington, District of Columbia, was killed, and Cadet Aviator Milton Renard Erdman, was injured today near Taylor field, [sic] by the fall of an airplane in which they were flying at 800 feet." The Aviation Archaeology database does not list this accident.

20 June
"ABERDEEN, Miss., June 20. - Lieut. Leo M. Hines, Ellenwood, [sic] Kansas, and Lieut. Francis M. Roberts, of Watertown, New York, are dead, and Lieut. Robert C. Moore, Elmwood Palace, [sic] Ohio, may die as the result of an airplane collision today at an altitude of 1,700 feet near Payne field." [sic] The Aviation Archaeology database lists Francis W. Roberts, in Curtiss JN-4D, AS-39260, and Robert G. Moore, in JN-4D, AS-39236, crashing a half mile N of Payne Field, NNE of West Point, Mississippi, this date. Joe Baugher's serial lists show these two aircraft to be JN-4CAN Canucks.

21 June
"ST. LOUIS, June 21. - Lieut. James R. Wheeler, 28, an aviator of this city, was killed at Scott field [sic] at Belleville, Ill., near here, today when his airplane plunged 500 feet to the earth. Cadet John M. Raffter of St. Paul, riding with Wheeler, escaped with slight injuries. Lieut. Wheeler's machine plunged to the flying field when it failed to come out of a tail spin, which he had attempted at too low an altitude." The Aviation Archaeology database does not list this accident.

5 July
"PARIS, July 5. - (Havas Agency.) – Two American aviators were killed today when the machine in which they were flying at a low altitude fell to the ground in flames. The airmen were Lieut. William Dudley Robbens and Second Lieut. John Wilford of the American army. The bodies of the aviators were burned to a crisp." The Air Service Journal on 11 July carries essentially this same news release under the heading "DIED OF ACCIDENT".

7 July
"NEW YORK, July 8. - Flight Sergeant Gino Gianfelce, [sic] one of Italy's most famous aviators, instructor of Resnati [,] D'Annunzio, and other well-known airmen of Italy, is dead here today, the result of a nose dive he attempted while flying in a fast scout machine slightly more than 300 feet above the ground – a trick he often had warned his pupils against." The Aviation Archaeology database lists Gino Gianfelce [sic] crashing at the Signal Corps Aviation School at Hazelhurst Field, Mineola, New York, on 7 July in an unidentified airframe after experiencing a stall/spin condition. The Air Service Journal carries this on 11 July: "Sgt. Gianfelice Gino, [sic] R. I. F. C. att. A. S. S. C. - Sergt. Gianfelice Gino, [sic] Royal Italian Flying Corps, att A. S. S. C., who was training American aviators to fly Caproni machines, dived to death at Hazelhurst Field July 7. Sergeant Gino was considered one of the best pilots of the Italian Flying Corps and had instructed practically all the noted Italian pilots and had made several world's records. He had just successfully tested an American built Caproni and carried Major General Kenly, Chief of Military Aeronautics, as one of the passengers. After landing he took up a S. V. A. scout to give an exhibition of acrobatics close to the ground and after half an hour misjudged his distance from the ground when going into a nose-dive and was unable to straighten out before striking the ground." The pilot's name is correctly Gian Felice Gino (9 May 1883 – 7 July 1918).

8 July
"By Associated Press to THE SUN BELLEVILLE, Ill., July 8. - Lieut. Richard H. Fawcett, 22 years old of Alexandria, Virginia, was instantly killed at 7 o'clock tonight and Cadet Lester H. Cox of New York City was slightly injured when an airplane went into a tail spin and fell 600 feet to the ground about two miles southeast of Scott field [sic] here." The Aviation Archaeology database has no listing for this accident.

9 July
The fourth-highest-scoring British ace of the Great War, Maj. James Thomas Byford McCudden, is killed when he side-slips into the ground while trying to return to the airfield at Auxi-le-Château after the engine of his S.E.5a cuts out. McCudden had taken off to fly to his new command, No. 60 Squadron RAF. He had 57 aerial victories.

15 July
"BUFFALO, N. Y., July 15. - Aviator F. S. Hale, Quincy, Ills., and Student Homer B. Sharpe, Washington, D. C., fell 100 feet in an airplane at Curtiss field today. Hale was dead when picked up and Sharpe was removed to the Erie county hospital with a fractured skull. It is believed the motor stopped while the machine was in the air."
Between 27 July and 1 August
Third prototype Sopwith Salamander, E5431, crashes in France before a newly-applied disruptive camouflage scheme can be evaluated.

28 July
Royal Air Force Sopwith Dolphin E4449 flown by Tone Bayetto crashed in Hampshire, England when the wings folded back and it dived into the ground from 200 feet.

1 August
"ST. LOUIS, Mo., Aug. 2. - An aviator at Scott field, [sic] whose name the officers would not disclose, fell 1,500 feet in his machine yesterday evening and suffered only bruises, it became known today. The plane was demolished." The Aviation Archeology database does not list this accident.

2 August
Curtiss JN-4D, AS-3888, crashes at Post Field, Fort Sill, Oklahoma, killing the pilot. "WICHITA FALLS, Tex., Aug. 2. - Lieut. W. L. Carson, of Call field, [sic] was killed in a fall from an airplane at Fort Sill, Oklahoma, this morning, according to a telegram received at Call field this afternoon. Lieutenant Carson flew to Fort Sill this morning. The report from Fort Sill says that Carson was alone in the machine when it fell. His home was at Hood River, Oregon." Apparently the report that the pilot fell FROM the plane should have read fell WITH the plane.

2 August
"DALLAS, Tex., Aug. 2. - Lieut. Robinson E. Bidwell, a flying instructor at Love field, [sic] whose parents reside at Red Bluff, California, was killed today at Rylie, nine miles south of Dallas, when his airplane burst into flames at an altitude of about 2,000 feet and fell. When about 500 feet from earth Lieutenant Bidwell, who was flying solo, jumped from his plane and was killed by the fall. The cause of the machine taking fire is not known. Lieutenant Bidwell came to Dallas about a month ago. His was the third fatality among Lpve field aviators since the field was established, more than a year ago." Curtiss JN-4HB bombing trainer, SC-38452, was destroyed.

2 August
Standard J-1, AS-1918, crashes and is written off at March Field, California. "By Associated Press to THE SUN RIVERSIDE, Aug. 2. - William L. Ash, flying cadet at March field [sic], fell 1,000 feet in a tail spin today and was seriously injured. He suffered a fractured leg and arm and puncture of the side. It is expected he will recover. Ash lived at Pittsburg, Kansas. It was the first serious accident at March field. Ash was making his second solo flight when he fell." The Aviation Archeology database lists the pilot as J. L. Ash.

2 August
"SAN DIEGO, Cal., Aug. 2 – Two serious airplane accidents are reported today by the Rockwell field [sic] aviation school at North Island, both accidents being caused by airplanes going into "tail spins." Corporal Carl F. A. Christenson was killed instantly in the first accident, while he was flying with Lieut H. F. Cotton. Their machine went into a tail spin while over the Coronado Tent City band pavilion at a height of 1,500 feet and dived into the bay. The lieutenant sustained minor injuries. Christenson came here from Norway or Sweden and gave the address of Mrs. Margaret McDonald, Philadelphia, for emergency requirements. The second accident occurred near the Otay mesa flying base. Lieut. Clement R. Jacomini, flying instructor, was up with Lieutenant Miller, their machine taking a tail spin from a height of 150 feet. Miller escaped unhurt, and Jacomini sustained a dislocated hip and painful bruises. The Aviation Archeology database lists pilot Horace G. Cotton as crashing S of the Tent City, Coronado, in Curtiss JN-4B, AS-3094, and Clement R. Jacomini crashing two miles from Otay mesa in Curtiss JN-4D, SC-39876. The "Casualties" section of the 8 August 1918 issue of the Air Service Journal gives the spelling as Cristenson, and states also that Lieut. Jacomini, of Pasadena, California, died of his injuries on 3 August 1918.

10 August
Lt. Erich Loewenhardt, third-highest-scoring German ace of the Great War, is KWF when the wheels of a Fokker D.VII flown by Lt. Alfred Wentz of Jasta 11 (also spelt Wenz in some sources) collide with the wing of his own Fokker D.VII, causing it to crash. He bails out but his chute fails to open. Lowenhardt, posted to JG.1, and flying with Jasta 10 from July 1917, scored 53 victories before his death. Wentz successfully bails out of his stricken fighter.

13 August
Jarvis Jennes Offutt (1894–1918), becomes the first fatality among natives of Omaha, Nebraska in World War I, when his S.E.5 crashed during a training flight near Valheureux, France, and succumbs to his injuries. The Flying Field, Fort George Crook, Nebraska renamed Offutt Field, 6 May 1924.

16 August
Royal Navy Air Service airship, R27, destroyed in a hangar fire at RNAS Howden along with a makeshift SSZ class blimp and two SSZ class blimps, SSZ.38 and SSZ.54. One airman dies.

19 August
First of three crashes of new Fokker E.V. (Eindekker V, or monoplane five), six of which are delivered to Jasta 6 of the Imperial German Air Service on 7 August, to occur in a week, kills Leutnant Emil Rolff when wing fails, and, like the Fokker Triplane before it, the type is grounded for investigation. Problem traced to shoddy workmanship at the Mecklenburg factory where defective wood spars, water damage to glued parts, and pins carelessly splintering the members instead of securing them are discovered. Upon return to service two months later, design is renamed the Fokker D.VIII in an effort to distance type's reputation as a killer. Rolff had scored the first kill in the type on 17 August.

24 August
U.S. Army Maj. William Roy Ream, the first flying surgeon of the United States Army, becomes the first flight surgeon to die in an aircraft accident, at the Effingham, Illinois airport, out of Chanute Field, Illinois, when his aircraft stalls/spins and crashes. Later in 1918, the Army renames the Aviation Field at what is now Naval Outlying Landing Field Imperial Beach, California, originally opened in 1917, as Ream Field.

7 September
"By Associated Press to THE SUN – MATHER FIELD, Sacramento, Cal., Sept. 7. - Flying Cadets William G. Wilson, of Berkeley, California, and a son of J. Stitt Wilson, at one time a candidate for the socialist party for governor of California, and James H. Wilson. of Pueblo, Colorado, met death today when their airplanes collided in the air. The accident occurred at the south end of the field. They were not related. Civilians who witnessed the collision said the airplanes came together head on. One of the airplanes tumbled downward and crashed to the earth, while the other seemed to be descending for a landing, witnesses said. William G. Wilson was killed instantly. He suffered a fractured skull and internal injuries. James E. Wilson was removed to the base hospital where he died about 25 minutes after the accident. He suffered internal injuries and his thigh was injured. The bodies of the two cadets were taken to an undertaking establishment in Sacramento where they will remain pending instructions from the relatives. They were draped with American flags. The cadets were flying at an altitude of about 3,500 feet when the airplanes came together. The accident occurred near Walsh station, a short distance from the southern end of the field. The wrecked airplanes fell to earth at points about a half mile apart." Curtiss JN-4Ds AS-3673 and AS-3995 written off in this accident.

11 September
Third prototype Vickers Vimy, B9954, crashes during testing – stalls on takeoff with full load at Martlesham Heath, bomb load explodes, pilot killed.

25 September
Chief Machinist's Mate Francis E. Ormsbee went to the rescue of two men in an aircraft which had crashed in Pensacola Bay, Florida. He pulled out the gunner and held him above water until help arrived, then made repeated dives into the wreckage in an unsuccessful attempt to rescue the pilot. For his heroism, Chief Ormsbee was awarded the Medal of Honor.

21 October
Burgess-built Hispano-Suiza-powered Curtiss N-9, A2468, is written off ("crashed to complete wreck") in Pensacola Bay, Florida, but with no injuries.

5 November
1st Lt. Byron Bilderback, 27th Aero Squadron, 1st Pursuit Group, is forced down by engine failure of his SPAD XIII near Montfaucon, France. He reports to the 27th Squadron C.O.: "Started on ‘A’ Flight patrol at 15:00 H. Motor ran well until about 16:00 H when turning at 2100 revs it suddenly grabbed and prop stopped instantly. I was flying at 500 meters and had no choice of landing place. Landed in shell holes, etc. Machine is a total washout. I brought back the clock and altimeter."

== 1919 ==
1 February
Flt. Lt. Frank Lloyd, attached to No. 61 Squadron RAF, left Rochford Aerodrome, Essex, in a Sopwith Camel biplane accompanied by another aircraft. His plane subsequently was flying very low over Westcliff-on-Sea, and just missing house roofs, it hit a trolley standard, then swerved and hit a large tree, removing many branches, turned over and crashed to the ground in allotments by Fairmead Avenue and burst into flames. Various people rushed to rescue Lloyd but he died of multiple injuries. He had been married just two weeks.

4 February
First of three Bristol F.2C Badger prototypes, F3495, suffers crash landing when its 320 hp (240 kW) ABC Dragonfly I nine-cylinder radial engine fails during the type's first take-off due to an air lock in the fuel feed. Pilot Cyril Uwins unhurt. Aircraft is subsequently rebuilt and flown.

9 April
Second of only two Bristol M.R.1 metal-covered, two-seat biplanes built, A5178, powered by 180 hp Wolseley Viper engine, flown by Capt. Frank Barnwell, strikes pine tree on approach to RAE Farnborough's North Gate and is written off.

2 May
A U.S. Army seaplane en route on afternoon flight from Balboa, Panama to France Field, near present-day Colón, Panama, with three aviators on board, suffers engine failure shortly after departure. Pilot Lt. J. R. L. Hitt attempts landing on Miraflores Lake but aircraft falls short and hits the front of the Miraflores Locks of the Panama Canal at ~1700 hrs. Airframe crumples "like a house of cards", according to account published by the Panama Star & Herald on 3 May. Hitt, Lt. Thomas Cecil Tonkin, and Maj. Harold Melville Clark (4 October 1890 – 2 May 1919) are all thrown from the aircraft into the water of the lock. "Lieutenant Tonkin was undoubtedly killed instantly by the twisting timbers of the machine. ...Major Clark sank to the bottom of the lock, and it's not known whether he was killed in the crash or whether he drowned", stated the article. Hitt was severely injured in the crash, but was rescued by bystanders. The Panama Star & Herald reported that a diver was sent to retrieve Clark's body. The Army rules his death as an accident due to internal injuries caused by "aeroplane traumatism", according to a War Department report on Clark's death dated 8 May 1919, and awards his mother $10,000. Clark is buried 29 May 1919, with full military honors at Arlington National Cemetery. Clark had made the first-ever inter-island flight in the Hawaiian Islands on 15 March 1918, in a Curtiss N-9 of the 6th Aero Squadron. Fort Stotsenburg, established in the Philippines in 1902, is renamed Clark Air Base with the establishment of the U.S. Air Force in 1947.

26 May
Monstrous Royal Air Force three-wing, six-engine Tarrant Tabor bomber, F1765, attempts first flight at Royal Aircraft Establishment, Farnborough, noses over on lift-off, forward fuselage crushed back to the wing, both crew, Capts. F. G. Dunn and P. T. Rawlings killed. No second prototype is ever built.

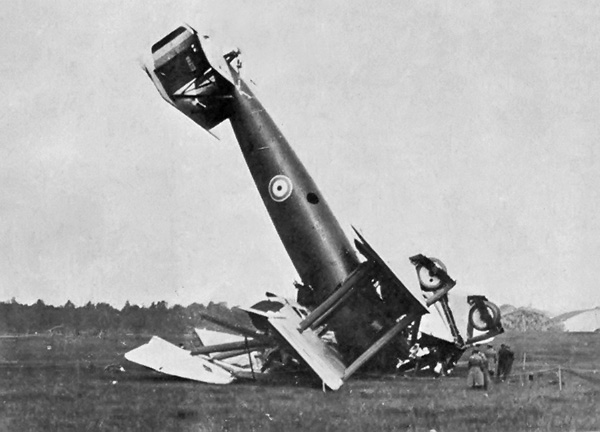
The Tarrant Tabor F1765 after its crash

8 June
Biplane bomber, Cierva BCD3 (Barcala-Cierva-Diaz), designed by Juan de la Cierva, reminiscent of the German Gotha, powered by a trio of 220 hp Hispano Suiza engines, called El Cangrejo (The Crab), is destroyed on a test flight when it stalls close to the ground. Pilot, Capt. Julio Rios Argiieso (also reported as Angueso), is shaken up but survives. Project is abandoned.

2 July
U.S. Navy blimp C-8 explodes while landing at Camp Holabird, Maryland, injuring ~80 adults and children who were watching it. Windows in homes a mile away are shattered by the blast.

15 July
Royal Navy North Sea class airship N.S.11 burns over the North Sea off Norfolk, England, killing twelve. In the early hours of 15 July on what was officially supposed to be a mine-hunting patrol, she was seen to fly beneath a long "greasy black cloud" off Cley next the Sea on the Norfolk coast and a massive explosion was heard shortly after. A vivid glare lasted for a few minutes as the burning airship descended, and finally plunged into the sea after a second explosion. There were no survivors, and the findings of the official Court of Enquiry were inconclusive, but amongst other possibilities it was thought that a lightning strike may have caused the explosion.

Summer
Sole flying prototype of Curtiss 18-B two-bay biplane version of 18-T triplane trainer, USAAS 40058, 'P-86', crashes early in flight trials at McCook Field, Dayton, Ohio. Type not ordered into production. One non-flying prototype also delivered for static testing.

1 August
Top World War I Russian ace Aleksandr Kazakov (32 kills, but only 20 officially) is killed in the crash of what was probably a Sopwith Camel. On 1 August 1918 Kazakov became a major in the Royal Air Force and was appointed to be commanding officer in charge of an aviation squadron of the Slavo-British Allied Legion made up of Camels. After the British withdrawal from Russia which left the Russian White Army in a desperate situation, Kazakov died in an aircraft crash during an air show on this date which was performed to boost the morale of the Russian anti-Bolshevik troops. Most witnesses of the incident thought Kazakov committed suicide.

10 August
Lts. Harold G. Peterson, pilot, and Paul H. Davis, observer-gunner, depart from Marfa Field, in the Big Bend area of Texas, on a routine Sunday morning patrol of the U.S.-Mexican border, in Curtiss JN-4D, 24146, based at Fort Bliss, El Paso, Texas, "Their mission was to patrol along the Rio Grande from Lajitas to Bosque Bonito and then land at Fort Bliss. Coming to the mouth of the Rio Conchos at Ojinaga, Chihuahua (opposite Presidio, Texas), they mistook the Conchos for the Rio Grande and followed it many miles into Mexico before being forced down by engine trouble. Thinking they were still on the Rio Grande, the airmen picked a spot on the "American" side of the river to land. The terrain was rough and the plane was wrecked. Having buried the machine-guns and ammunition to keep it out of the hands of bandits, Peterson and Davis started walking down the river, thinking they would come to the U.S. Cavalry outpost at Candelaria, Texas." It is assumed when they fail to arrive at Fort Bliss that they have either returned to Marfa or had been forced down. A search is begun on 11 August as far south as Chihuahua City, but the flyers, caught in thick brush, are not seen when overflown on 12 August by a plane following the Conchos. Search continues until Sunday, 17 August, when word is received by Capt. Leonard F. ("Two-Gun") Matlack, commanding Troop K, 8th Cavalry, at Candelaria, that the airmen are being held for ransom. "The flyers had been taken prisoner on Wednesday, August 13, by a Villista desperado named Jesus Renteria. The bandit sent the ransom note to a rancher at Candelaria, along with telegrams which he forced the airmen to write to their fathers and the Secretary of War, the Commanding General of the Southern Department, and the Commanding Officer of U.S. forces in the Big Bend District. Renteria demanded $15,000 not later than Monday, August 18, or the two Americans would be killed." The War Department authorizes the payment, and local ranchers subscribe to the full amount so that it can be disbursed from the Marfa National Bank. Negotiations through intermediaries see Captain Matlack crossing the border on Monday night to swap half the money for one American. All goes smoothly and in 45 minutes he returns with Lieutenant Peterson. But en route to the rendezvous with the other half of the ransom, Matlack overhears Renteria's men discussing killing both Americans once they have the money. At the meeting, Matlack pulls a gun, directs the Mexicans to tell Renteria to "go to hell", and, avoiding the ambush, rides back across the border with Lieutenant Davis. On Tuesday, 19 August, Capt. Matlack leads Troops C and K, 8th Cavalry, in pursuit of Renteria and his gang. Air Service planes scout ahead, and 1st Lts. Frank Estill and Russell H. Cooper spot three horsemen in a canyon ~12–15 miles W of Candelaria in late afternoon. When they close for a look, the riders fire on the DH.4. Estill makes a firing pass with his machine guns and Cooper opens up with his Lewis guns, killing one man, reportedly Renteria. The search for the gang continues until 23 August when, with the Mexican government protesting the invasion of its territory, American forces return to the U.S. The loss of JN-4D 24146 was recorded 13 August.

21 August
Two U.S. Army officers of the 9th Corps Observation Squadron, patrolling the border with Mexico on a flight from Calexico Field to Rockwell Field, San Diego, California, become lost in a storm, and land their DH.4B on a beach at Refugio de Guadalupe on Las Animas Bay in Lower California. Lieutenants Cecil H. Connolly and Frederick D. Waterhouse survive for 19 days before they are murdered by Mexican fisherman for their pitiful belongings and their bodies buried. The destroyer USS Aaron Ward is dispatched to retrieve the bodies and investigate the circumstances, returning the airmen’s remains to San Diego on 26 October 1919. The Governor of Lower California, Esteban Cantu, declares that the aviators died either from thirst or were killed and their bodies partly dismembered by "ravenous" coyotes, both theories being rejected outright by Major R. S. Bratton, commander of the party that recovers the victims’ remains. Bratton asserts that the names of those involved in the murders are known both to him and to representatives of Gov. Cantu. Colonel H. L. Watson, commanding officer of Rockwell Field, states that the skull of one of the airmen had been fractured.

4 October
Army Major Patrick Frissell is killed in a mid-air collision in an unknown type from the Aviation Repair Depot, at Indianapolis, Indiana, according to one source, at a location reported as both Port Jervis, New York, and Binghamton, New York. Another source states that he was killed when the DH-4 he was piloting struck a tree and crashed on Prospect Mountain, near the southern end of Lake George in New York State. Second Lieutenant Gerald E. Ballard, the aircraft’s observer, was seriously injured in the crash. Maj. Frissell and Lt. Ballard were en route from Binghamton to Mineola, New York, to take part in a transcontinental air race. Frissell commanded the Speedway Aviation Repair Depot at Indianapolis.

5 October
Colonel Townsend F. Dodd, 33, commander of Langley Field, Virginia, is killed in an air crash at Bustleton Field, Philadelphia, shortly after 1600 hrs., during preparations for the New York to San Francisco transcontinental air race. While attempting to land in heavy fog, the aircraft, DH.4, AS-24006, at an altitude of 20 feet, strikes a tree. The engine tears loose and pins Dodd against the gas tank. "He was strangled to death by the heavy motor which rested on his neck." Machinist George E. Hess, flying with him, is uninjured. On 1 May 1928 Remount Station #1 was named Dodd Army Airfield, the nation's first dedicated military airfield. Dodd Army Airfield was an airfield located within the current boundaries of Fort Sam Houston in San Antonio, Texas. Dodd Field includes the area bounded on the north by Rittiman Road, on the west by Harry Wurzbach Memorial Highway, on the south by Winans (formerly Dashiell) Road and on the east by the Fort Sam Houston Reservation boundary. Dodd Field was designated in War Department General Order Number 5. Prior to deployment to Europe for World War I Dodd had served at the remount station and had been Commander of the Aviation Post when the 3rd Aero Squadron was stationed there. He was buried in Arlington National Cemetery. Active flight operations were terminated in October 1931, although the official date of closure of Dodd Field as an aviation facility has not been determined.

5 October
In an unrelated accident at Bustleton Field, Philadelphia, but within 15 minutes of Colonel Townsend F. Dodd’s fatal crash, four Army airmen are injured when their plane crashes in heavy fog. Major F. M. Davis, Captain Harry Douglas, Lieutenant C. R. Colt, and Harry R. Kashe, mechanic, are recovering in Frankford Hospital.

7 October
"EUGENE, Ore., 7 Oct.. - Lieutenant Webb, of Eugene, was killed at Medford today when his De Haviland [sic] plane fell to the earth. The motor stopped when the plane went into a tail spin. Sergeant McGinnis, who was with him, was seriously injured, but his chances for recovery are good."

8 October
"MINEOLA, L. I., 8 Oct.. - Benedict Crowell, assistant secretary of war, narrowly escaped injury this afternoon when an airplane in which he was riding, fell 50 feet to the ground here and overturned. Both Crowell and his pilot, Maurice Cleary, were buried under the machine, but escaped with a shaking up. The accident occurred when Cleary tried to avoid striking a hangar. Crowell announced his intention at once of going up in another machine."

8 October
During the first (and only) transcontinental reliability and endurance test, an air race between Roosevelt Field, Long Island, New York and the Presidio of San Francisco, California, Brig. Gen. Lionel Charlton, Royal Air Force, the British Air Attaché, with Flight Lieutenant P. E. Traill, also of the embassy staff, the first to take off, hits a fence during a forced landing at Interlaken, near Ithaca, New York in his Bristol F.2 Fighter, 2nd Lt. George C. McDonald (also reported as MacDonald) hits a ditch when engine trouble in his unspecified type (probably a de Havilland) forces him down at Plymouth, Pennsylvania, and 1st Lt. D. B. Gish's DH-4 catches fire over Livingston County in western New York state, and he makes an emergency landing near Canadice. Neither he, nor his passenger, Capt. Paul de la Vergne of the French air service and French Air Attaché, are injured, but the aircraft is written off. A forced landing kills Sgt. W. H. Nevitt when the Liberty L-12 engine of the DH-4B piloted by Col. Gerald C. Brant (also reported as Brandt) fails after an oil line breaks. Plane plunges to the ground one mile N of Deposit, New York when power is lost on landing, killing Nevitt and injuring Brant. Brant was found with both arms and legs broken. A DH.4 flown by Lt. H. D. Smith is wrecked near Lockport, New York. He and his passenger escape injury. Smith lost his bearings in a rain storm while en route from Rochester to Buffalo, and landed in a field at the south end of Lockport at 1100 hrs. "In starting again the machine failed to clear an apple orchard and crashed to the ground. Lieutenant Smith and Corporal E. A. Nutell, his passenger, escaped unhurt. The machine was wrecked." Of entrants flying from the Presidio to New York, one DH-4B crashes attempting to land at Buena Vista Field near Salt Lake City, Utah, killing pilot Maj. Dana H. Crissy, commander of Mather Field, California, and his mechanic, SFC Virgil Thomas. The International News Service reported that Crissy fell into a nose spin endeavoring to land. "Crissy, say onlookers, made too sudden and sharp a turn as he was landing and because he was close to the ground could not pull his machine out of the spin." "Sergeant Thomas, who was an observer and a reserve military aviator, was killed with Maj. D. H. Crissy, pilot, when their plane fell into a small pond near the Buena Vista landing field on the outskirts of Salt Lake City. Crissy and Thomas were just completing the first lap of the international air derby and were preparing to land. Thomas was seen to wave to men on the field as the plane descended. Suddenly it fell, nose down, into a pond of mud and water, 150 feet below. Both were unconscious when they were taken from the pond, and died when they reached the hospital. Sergeant Thomas enlisted 18 Feb. 1918, in Los Angeles. He was 22 years old and recently obtained rating as a reserve military aviator. He was stationed at Mather field and was recently engaged in forest fire patrol work in Oregon." Grief stricken at news of the death of his son, "W. C. Thomas of 951 Fresno Street [Los Angeles], today sought information as to the disposition of the body. Mr. Thomas telegraphed the Salt Lake police chief and the military authorities at Rockwell field but received no answer. Today, through the Evening Herald, he endeavored to learn details of the accident and what was done with his son’s body." The flying field at the Presidio is subsequently named Crissy Field.

9 October
Continuing the cross-country contest, a DH-4B hits the side of a mountain W of Cheyenne, Wyoming, in a snow storm, killing 1st Lt. Edwin V. Vales and badly injuring 2nd Lt. William C. Goldsborough. A wire service report lists the crash site as near Saratoga. "Wales’ mother lives in Los Angeles. Wales is said to have been connected with a Southern California moving picture company before entering the service." Word reached Rawlins that Wales died from his injuries and the cold a few hours after his plane struck Elk Mountain. Lt. Goldsborough walked several hours in search of aid. He "finally stumbled into the Paulson ranch and a rescuing party was sent out. The party found Wales dead." The body of Lt. Wales, accompanied by Lt. Goldsborough, arrived at Cheyenne on 11 October. Goldsborough stated that the blizzard was so bad that they could not see 20 feet ahead when they struck the granite side of the mountain. "By a weird fate the mountain was the only elevation of more than 100 feet in an area of over 200 square miles and the unlucky Wales also missed by only a few feet the Covet Pass, which splits the mountain and through which he might have passed safely." Lt. A. M. Roberts and his observer survive a close call when, in an effort to make up for lost time, Roberts chooses the direct route, over Lake Erie, between Buffalo and Cleveland. His engine fails, and he has to ditch in the lake. Luckily, a passing freighter sees the crash and picks up the two men. An International News Service report identifies the crew of this aircraft as pilot Lieutenant H. T. Hynes, and his observer, and gives the location as "several miles out of Ashtabula Harbor."

10 October
On third day of transcontinental contest, an east-bound DH-4B, piloted by Maj. Albert Sneed, almost out of gas, makes fast landing at Curtiss Field at Buffalo, New York. Passenger Sgt. Worth C. McClure undoes his seatbelt and slides onto the rear fuselage to weight down the tail for a quicker stop. Plane bounces on landing, smashes nose-first into the ground, and McClure is thrown off and killed. Major Sneed suffers from shock but is otherwise unhurt. Lt. E. M. Manzleman (also reported as Manzelman) makes a forced landing at Washington Park in the morning but later flies onto Ashburn Field, Chicago. Lt. A. H. Page landed at Grant Park, Chicago, at 1322 hrs., breaking a wheel on rough ground. Page, and his assistant, Lt. George M. Newman, the Marine entries, hoped to get away with a quick repair.

15 October
Captain Lowell H. Smith safely arrives at Curtiss Field, Buffalo, New York, leading the western aviators in the cross-country flight, but his aircraft is accidentally destroyed by fire that night. He will not be permitted to continue in the air derby and will return to his post by rail.

15 October
Two more fatalities are recorded in the transcontinental endurance test when 2nd Lts. French Kirby and Stanley C. Miller die in an emergency landing in their DH-4 at Castle Rock, Utah, near the Wyoming–Utah border when they suffer engine failure near Evanston, Wyoming, falling about 200 feet. During the two-week test, 54 accidents wreck or damage planes. Twenty-nine result from motor trouble, 16 from bad landings, 5 from poor weather, 2 when pilots lose their way, 1 in take-off, and 1 by fire. In 42 cases the accident meant the end of the race for the pilot. Seven fatalities occur during the race, one in a de Havilland DH-4B, the others in DH-4s. Lt. John Owen Donaldson was awarded the Mackay Gold Medal for taking first place in the Army's only transcontinental air race. Donaldson Air Force Base, South Carolina, would be eventually named for the Great War ace (eight credited victories).

15 October
Captain Roy Francis is forced to discontinue his "around the rim" tour when his Martin MB-1 is damaged near Yutan, Nebraska.

16 October
Lt. Belvin Maynard, on the return leg of the transcontinental derby, is forced down four miles W of Wahoo, Nebraska, with a broken crankshaft in his DH.4. Neither Lt. Maynard nor Mechanic Sgt. Cline are injured. (Also reported as Kline and Klein.) An ordained Baptist minister, Maynard had been heavily covered by the press as the "Flying Parson" or the "Sky Pilot." Assistance is sent by Army trucks from Omaha field at Fort Crook. Maynard wired Washington for permission to transfer an engine from the MB-1 downed the previous day to his aircraft in order to continue the flight.

16 October
Captain Harry Smith and Lieutenant Allen, observer, are forced down at Fernley, Nevada, and their DH.4 is wrecked. They are not injured, but they will not be allowed to continue in the air contest.

17 October
Major Carl Spatz withdraws from the aerial derby, and turns his plane over to Captain Lowell Smith, permitting him to continue west on the second leg of the competition, after Smith’s plane was accidentally burned while undergoing maintenance at Buffalo, New York. Lt. Belvin W. Maynard, the "Flying Parson," resumes his trip eastward from Wahoo, Nebraska, after an engine change on his aircraft.

17 October
Lt. Alex Pearson Jr. is forced down at North Platte, Nebraska, with a broken motor. He planned to resume flying on Monday 20 October after replacing his engine with one from the Martin MB-1 which was forced down at Yutan, Nebraska. The local control commander expressed the powerplant to him at North Platte. Lt. Maynard, the "Flying Parson," repaired his downed aircraft with the other engine from the disabled bomber.

18 October
Major Gilkerson’s plane is wrecked upon landing at Rawlins, Wyoming, pilot and observer uninjured. Major Abbey wrecks his plane in a forced landing near Auburn, California, but he is uninjured. Lt. Gish strikes a building on the Presidio landing field upon arrival at San Francisco, at 1122 hrs., demolishing his plane. Neither he nor his observer Pomeroy are injured.

Autumn
A Caquot Type R observation balloon, manufactured by Goodyear, being deflated at Fort Sill, Oklahoma, explodes, with 24 soldiers handling sand bags on the leeward side of the balloon receiving burns. A dramatic photo exists of men bolting away from the airship as it ignites. Nearly 1,000 were manufactured in 1918–1919. A Type R is displayed at the National Museum of the United States Air Force, thought to be the sole survivor of some manufactured in Great Britain during World War II.

18 December
The prototype Vickers Viking, an amphibious aircraft designed for military use, registered G-EAOV, a five-seat cabin biplane with a pusher propeller driven by a Rolls-Royce Falcon water-cooled V 12 engine, crashes as Sir John Alcock takes it to the Paris exhibition whilst trying to land at Côte d'Evrard, near Rouen, Normandy in foggy weather.

23 December
"RIVERSIDE, 23 Dec.. - Second Lieutenant Herbert Tuchborne, and Private Allister Lima, were instantly killed at March field, [sic] the army aviation school, near here when the plane fell about 2000 feet today. Details of the accident were not given out, pending the completion of an official preliminary investigation."

== 1920 ==
1 February
World War I American ace (twelve victories) Field Eugene Kindley, of Gravette, Arkansas, commanding officer of the 94th Aero Squadron, is killed in a crash at Kelly Field near San Antonio, Texas, during a preparatory demonstration flight for General John J. Pershing. A control cable snaps on the Royal Aircraft Factory S.E.5 biplane Kindley is flying, AS-8137, of the 96th Aero Squadron, he stalls, falls from an altitude of 100 feet, his body both crushed and burned. Kindley Air Force Base, Bermuda, is later named for him. Other sources give his crash date as both 2 February and 3 February.

17 March
Nieuport 28C-1, U.S. Navy BuNo A5794, crashes on turret on takeoff from USS Arizona, operating in Caribbean waters. Obtained from Army after Armistice.

19 April
Two aircraft written off in separate accidents at Bolling Field, Washington, D.C. The forced landing after engine failure of an SE-5A, serial not recorded, flown by R. S. Haynes, near the U.S. Soldier's Home in northwest Washington, D.C., shows in reports dated 20 April.

19 April
"MODESTO, April 19. - Lieutenant W. M. Randolph of Rockwell Field, driving his German Fokker plane W-7 [probably a Fokker D.VII] from Rockwell Field to the aeronautical show at San Francisco, wrecked the plane here this afternoon when he attempted to make a landing at the edge of the aviation field. The under part of the machine was completely torn away, but the pilot escaped without injury. His engine was stopped when he attempted to alight, and when the wheels struck a ditch he was unable to get the engine started in time to take the air again, and the Fokker, making a leap of about 50 feet, turned turtle and was put out of commission. The dismantled machine will be shipped to San Francisco." Captain William Millican Randolph will die in the crash of a Curtiss AT-4 Hawk on 17 February 1928, and Randolph Field, Texas, will be named in his honor.

22 April
Three more aircraft are wrecked at Bolling Field, Washington, D.C., including Airco DH.4, AS-32562, piloted by Harold A. McGinniss, heavily damaged in a forced landing. Source lists it as a DH-4M, but this is suspect as that model does not appear until 1923.

22 April
"YUMA, Ariz., April 22. - Lieutenant F. C. Bell, United States army aviator, was drowned in the Colorado River here early tonight when a government airplane belonging to the border patrol in which he was attempting to fly beneath the Ocean-to-Ocean highway bridge at this point, struck a high tension wire suspended below the structure and fell into the stream."

23 April
Curtiss JN-6HO single-control observation trainer, AS-41912, suffers engine failure "after the machine [had] risen but 100 feet from the ground" at March Field, California, the forced landing seriously injuring pilot Sgt. Mack E. Killman and killing passenger Cpl. H. F. Waverneck. The biplane comes down on the Crandall Ranch, ½ mile N of the Perris High School, Perris, California.

10 May
"AMERICUS, Ga., May 10. - Earl P. W. Blacklear, 24, of San Diego, former army air instructor, was instantly killed here today in a fall of 1500 feet while flying alone in a German Fokker machine, one of those surrendered by the Germans under the armistice. Blacklear has been a civilian employee of Souther field since his discharge from the army." The Aviation Archeology website lists the accident date as 11 May 1920, with no identification of the aircraft type involved.
21 May
"SAN ANTONIO, Tex., May 21. - Lieutenant Alvin M. St. John of Memphis, Tenn., and Private Carl L. Cuhler of Elgin, Ills., were instantly killed here this afternoon when a plane they were flying crashed into a flagpole and then into a building at Kelly Field." The Aviation Archeology website reports that St. John was flying Airco DH.4A, AS-24158, but according to Joe Baugher's site, that serial ties up to a Curtiss JN-4D. The Aviation Archeology site also lists the accident date incorrectly as 28 May 1920.

22 May
Bristol F.2C Badger partial prototype, completed in 1919 for aerodynamic tests, using Armstrong-Siddeley Puma engine, but only the wings and undercarriage of the Badger design (and locally referred to as the Badger X – for experimental) crashes this date. It is entered on the civil register as K110, AFTER it has already been written off.

25 May
"SANTA ANA, May 25. - Lieutenant Hutchinson, naval aviator, was seriously injured at Newport Mesa, seven miles from here, today when an airplane in which he and Gunner Reushall were making a trial flight fell 100 feet. Hutchinson suffered a compound fracture of the right leg and cuts about the face and shoulders. Reushall escaped injury. Both were pinned under the wreckage of the plane, which was a complete loss." Lester B. Hutchinson was Naval Aviator No. 203.

19 June
U.S. Navy D-1 blimp, A4450, is destroyed by fire at the Goodyear Wingfoot Lake Airship Base, Suffield Township, Portage County, Ohio. Also lost are two balloons owned by the Goodyear Tire and Rubber Company. The origin of the fire, which broke out in a hangar, was not known. Losses were estimated at $160,000.

5 July
Dundalk Flying Field, opened in Baltimore, Maryland in 1920, is almost immediately renamed Logan Field when, on this date, Army Lt. Patrick H. Logan is fatally injured after his Nieuport 28, F6506, nicknamed the "Red Devil", crashes at the airport's inaugural air show following a stall/spin. In response to the tragedy, the airfield is renamed in his honor, with the announcement of the new name being made at the closing ceremonies of the airshow during which he died.

8 July
Five Mexican military flyers are killed late this date in the crash of a Farman biplane, which falls 1,900 feet and comes down near La Colorada, Mexico. The plane was en route north from Mexico City with seven on board.

12 August
Lt. William Calvin Maxwell, 28, of the 3d Aero Squadron, Camp Stotsenberg in Luzon, Philippines, a native of Atmore, Alabama, is killed in an aviation crash in the Philippines. While on a flight from Camp Stotsenberg to Manila, engine trouble forced Lt. Maxwell to attempt to land his DH-4, AS-23587, in a sugarcane field. Maneuvering to avoid a group of children playing below, he struck a flagpole hidden by the tall sugarcane and was killed instantly. On the recommendation of his former commanding officer, Maj. Roy C. Brown, Montgomery Air Intermediate Depot, Montgomery, Alabama, was renamed Maxwell Field on 8 November 1922.

2 October
U.S. Navy Lt. Cdr. William Merrill Corry Jr. (5 October 1889 – 6 October 1920), of Quincy, Florida, designated Naval Aviator No. 23 in March 1916, while on a flight from Long Island, New York, with another pilot, the aircraft crashes, with Corry earning the Medal of Honor "for heroic service in attempting to rescue a brother officer from a flame-enveloped airplane near Hartford, Connecticut. On 2 October 1920, an airplane in which Lieutenant Commander Corry was a passenger crashed and burst into flames. He was thrown 30 feet clear of the aircraft and, though injured, rushed back to the burning machine and endeavored to release the pilot. In so doing he sustained serious burns, from which he died four days later." In 1923, Corry Field, a new satellite airfield for Naval Air Station Pensacola, is named in his honor. Three U.S. Navy destroyers have been named USS Corry, a Clemson-class in 1921, a Gleaves-class in 1941, and a Gearing-class, in 1945.

13 December
Navy balloon A-5598, departs Rockaway Naval Air Station and went off-course; after a flight of 25 hours it goes down in the Canadian wilderness. Its crew of three are reported missing, but are later rescued.

== 1921 ==
23 March
In an all-night training flight, a U.S. Navy free balloon, A-5597, launches from NAS Pensacola, Florida, with five crew and drifts over the Gulf of Mexico. Two messages received by pigeon indicate it first is 20 miles from St. Andrews Bay, then that all ballast had been dropped and that it was at 100 feet and descending. On 8 April 1921, a fishing vessel finds the balloon floating on the sea, with the gondola three and a half fathoms 21 feet (6.4 m) under water. Nothing is ever found of Chief Quartermaster E. W. Wilkinson, enlisted men R. V. Wyland, E. L. Kershaw, and J. P. Elder, and Marine Corps member W. H. Tressey.

15 April
1st Lt. James J. Langin, army pilot, and senior at the Law School at Georgetown University, from Neola, Iowa, is killed at Bolling Field, Washington, D. C., when his S.E.5 side-slips for unknown reasons and he loses control. "He was descending to make a landing and was within 200 feet of the ground when the machine fell." Knocked unconscious by the impact, he dies when "the machine, flooded with gasoline, burst into flames. The body was removed as soon as it could be reached, later being taken to the Walter Reed Hospital."

28 May
Seven men, five of the Army and two civilians, were killed in the wreck of an Army Curtiss Eagle ambulance airplane, USAAS 64243, of the 1st Provisional Air Brigade, at Morgantown, Maryland, near Indian Head, 40 miles southeast of Washington, in a terrific wind and electrical storm at 1825 hrs. The dead were: Lieutenant Colonel Archie Miller, U.S.A., M. H., Washington, D.C.; Maurice Connolly of Dubuque, Iowa, formerly a member of the United States House of Representatives; A. G. Batchelder of Washington, chairman of the Board of the American Automobile Association; Lieutenant Stanley M. Ames of Washington, pilot of the wrecked plane; Lieutenant Cleveland M. McDermott, Langley Field, Virginia; Lieutenant John M. Pennewill, Langley Field, Virginia; and Sergeant Mechanic Richard Blumenkranz, Washington. Army Air Service officers said the accident was the worst in the history of aviation in the United States and that it was one of the few in which all of the passengers in a falling aircraft had been killed almost instantly. The ship struck the ground nose first and the impact was so great that the big 400-horsepower Liberty motor in the front end of the craft was torn from its chassis and thrown back into the cockpit on top of the pilot and the passengers. All the bodies were mutilated. The Curtiss-Eagle was returning from a trip to Langley Field, near Newport News, Virginia, where it had departed at 1630 hrs., and had just crossed the Potomac River, when it ran into the storm which had passed over Washington an hour before.

21 June
"RIVERSIDE, June 21. - Sergeant James E. Jones, of Washington, D. C., was killed, and Private Lester J. Overton injured in an army airplane in which they were flying fell 300 feet to the ground at March Field today. The accident was caused by the motor of the plane stalling, it was stated by officials at the field. Jones was instantly killed, while Overton's injuries were reported not to be serious." Curtiss JN-6H, AS-44889, came down 1½ miles E and ¼ mile S of the airfield.

7 July
US Navy Airship C-3 burns at Naval Air Station Hampton Roads, Norfolk, Virginia. The crew escapes serious injuries.

7 July
"SAN FRANCISCO, July 7. - An army observation balloon, up in training work, fell 2000 feet into the bay today. The crew was rescued by a tug sent out from Angel island. No one was injured. Overloading is said to have been the cause of the accident."

10 July
"MOUNDSVILLE, W. Va. - Five persons are known to be dead and 50 others were injured seriously when an army bombing plane crashed into a crowd of spectators at Langlin Field here. [sic – Langin Field]. The dead: Ralph Hartzel, 18 years old; Carl Pettit, 16, of Moundsville; Fred Edge, 35, Round Bottom, Ohio [sic West Virginia]; Mrs. George Long, 65, of Moundsville. The body of a boy has been recovered and it is believed the body of another persons [sic] is under the flaming wreckage, which cannot be approached owing to intense heat. ... Scores of others were rushed away in autos and taken to homes of private physicians, and it was impossible to obtain a complete list. The plane is charge [sic] of Lieutenants R. Melvor and D. H. Dunton and Mechanic W. D. Conwell, was circling the field preparatory to taking off for Washington, and according to the statement of Lieutenant McPherson, the controls stalled and the plane crashed head-on into a line of automobiles. As it hit the fuel tank burst and exploded, spraying burning gasoline in all directions, and setting fire to 15 automobiles. Several score men, women, and children, many of them with their clothing in flames, were dragged out of burning automobiles, fifteen of which were destroyed."

12 July
Major Sheldon Harley Wheeler is killed in the crash of DH-4B, AS-63525, on take off from Luke Field, Ford Island, Oahu, Hawaiian Islands. He was commander of Luke Field at the time of his death. In February 1922 construction began on a new airfield in the Wahiawa District of the Island and on 11 November it was named Wheeler Field in his honour.

19 July
USAAS pilot 1st Lt. Willard S. Clark is killed at Ellington Field, Texas, when his Orenco D enters a spin at low altitude and plunges to the ground. All aircraft manufactured in this batch are grounded.

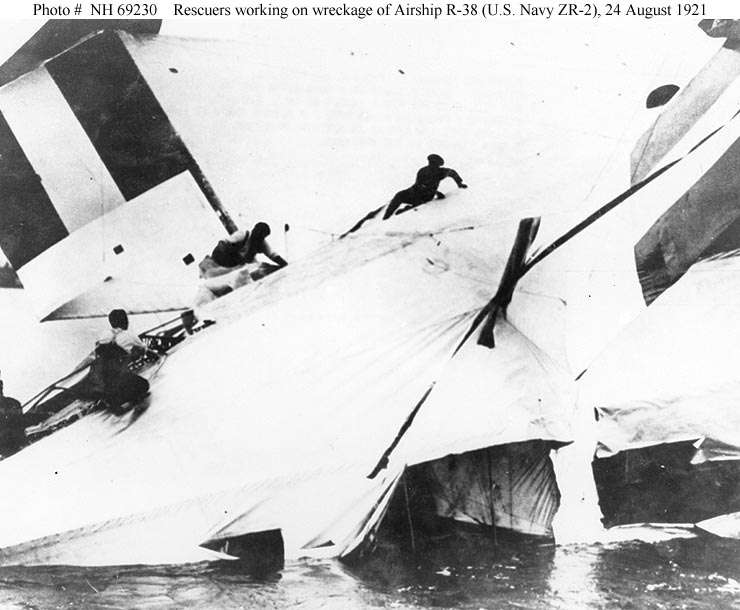
Rescuers scramble across the wreckage of British R-38/USN ZR-2 airship, 24 August 1921.

24 August
During its fourth flight, the British airship R38 (ZR-2), due to be delivered to the United States Navy as the ZR-2, broke in two on a test flight near Hull, England, the forward half falling into the Humber River whereupon spilt gasoline on the water caught fire, while the stern, not in flames, settled on a sandbar. The ship had been undergoing turning trials, at 63 mph at 2,500 feet, with the rudders worked to their maximum, causing the lightweight structure to fail. 44 died, including British Air Commodore E.M. Maitland, Leader of Airships, and 16 Americans. Maxfield Field at NAS Lakehurst, New Jersey, named 6 January 1944 in honor of Commander Louis H. Maxfield, Naval Aviator No. 17, who lost his life in the R38 crash.

31 August
U.S. Navy airship D-6, A5972, with a C-type envelope built by Goodyear in 1920 and a special enclosed car built by the Naval Aircraft Factory, is destroyed in the Naval Air Station Rockaway hangar gasoline fire along with two small dirigibles, the C-10 and the Goodyear airship H-1, A5973, the sole H-model, a powered two-seat observation balloon built along the lines of the commercial Goodyear "Pony Blimp", and the kite balloon A-P.

29 September
First Orenco D manufactured by Curtiss, 63281, McCook Project Number 'P163', loses entire leading edge of its upper wing, crashing at McCook Field, Ohio. An investigation by an officer of the flying test section of the USAAS Engineering Division reveals that the Orenco Ds are badly constructed, no fewer than 30 defects and faulty fittings being recorded in the published report, forcing the Air Service to withdraw all Orenco Ds from use (Joe Baugher cites date of 28 September).

28 December
Second Lieutenant Samuel Howard Davis (1896–1921) is killed in the crash of Curtiss JN-6HG-1 (possibly USAAS serial 44796, seen wrecked at Carlstrom AAF, date unknown) in which he was a passenger, at Carlstrom Field, Arcadia, Florida. Davis-Monthan Landing Field, later Davis-Monthan Air Force Base, Tucson, Arizona, is named in part for him, 1 November 1925. He attended high school in that community.

== 1922 ==
21 February
On a cold and overcast day, U.S. Army semi-rigid (blimp with a keel) Roma, bought from Italy, formerly T34, suffers control box failure at stern in flight at 1410 hrs., nosed into the ground, struck power lines at the U.S. Army Quartermaster Intermediate Depot, Norfolk, Virginia, and burst into flames, killing 34 of 45 on board, including Capt. Dale Mabry, its commander. This would remain the worst American aviation accident until the loss of the USS Akron in 1933.

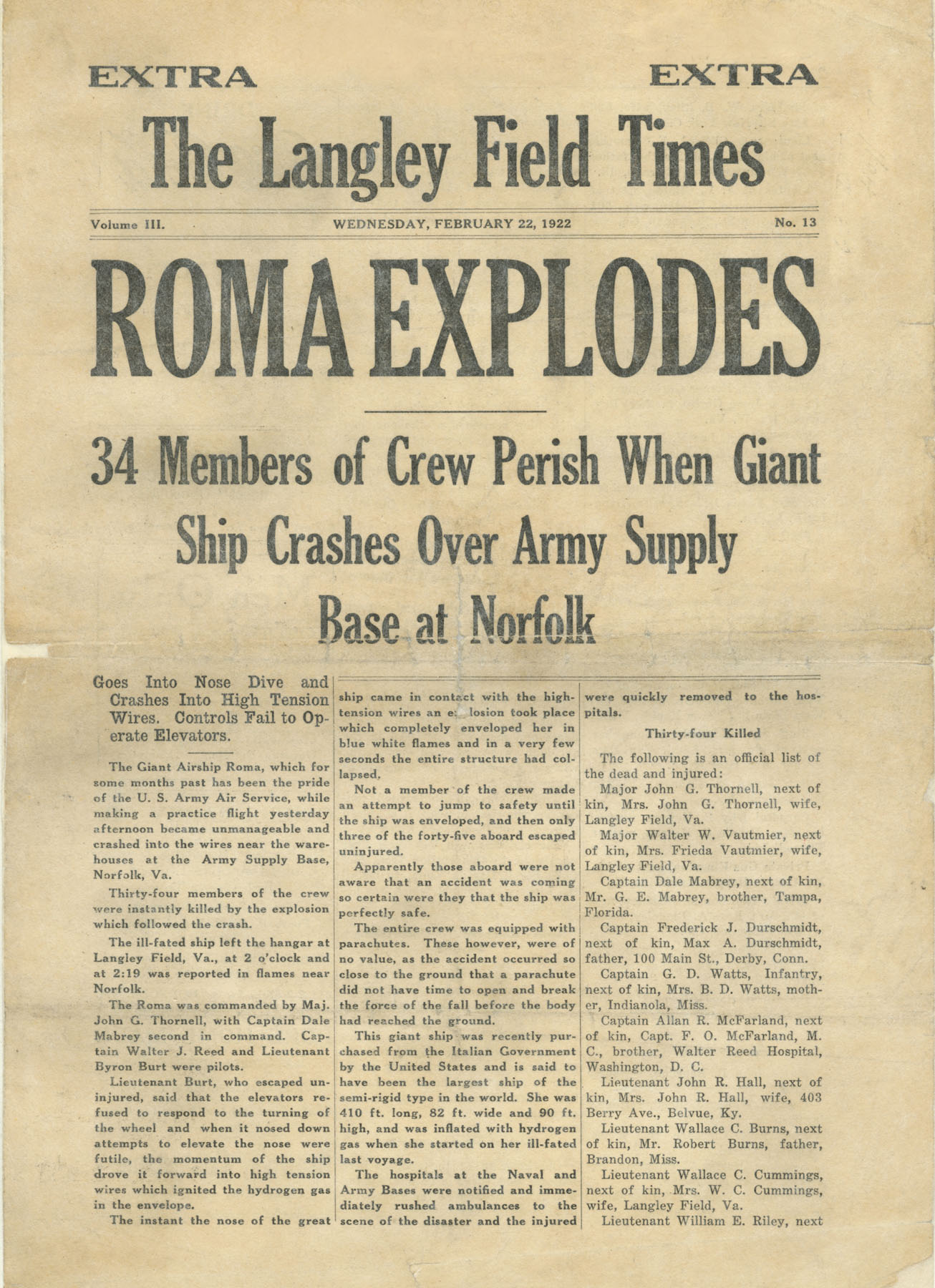
22 February 1922 Langley Field base newspaper extra edition about the Roma Tragedy

Accident spurs American lighter-than-air operations to switch to helium, less buoyant than hydrogen, but non-flammable. Dale Mabry Municipal Airport in Tallahassee, Florida, that city's first airport, was named after Mabry, a Tallahassee native.

21 February
U.S. Marine Corps Naval Aircraft Factory F-5-L, A-3591, of VS-1M, crashed during a night flight, this date.

11 May
"HAMPTON, Va., May 11. - The army blimp, A-4 arrived safely at Langley Field late today after having drifted for an hour and a half over the ocean off Cape Henry with her engines dead. The craft drifted to sea before a four-mile northwest breeze until repairs were made when she turned her nose toward shore. The crew of five were none the worse for their experience. The engine trouble developed about 3:30 o'clock in the afternoon and for a time considerable anxiety was felt for the craft and its occupants by short stations and radio offices which kept in communication with the blimp. It was found unnecessary however to despatch [sic] airplanes or other blimps to her assistance. Army officers refused to give out the names of the crew although it was said Lieutenant Olmstead was at the wheel during the flight." The pilot was probably Lt. Robert Stanford Olmsted, who will be killed on 23 September 1923, when the Army free balloon S-6 is struck by lightning over the Netherlands during an international balloon race. The A-4 was the first blimp operated by the U.S. Army, built by Goodyear in April 1919. It arrived at Langley Field on 11 July 1919 from Akron under the command of Lt. George McEntire.

June
Sole prototype of the Royal Air Force Vickers Valentia flying boat, N124, which was constructed between 1918 and 1921, and completed by S.E. Saunders of Cowes, Isle of Wight, crashes and is written off.

17 June
Army airmen Lieutenant Robert O. Hanley (also reported as Robert E. Hanley) and Sergeant Arthur Opperman are killed near Louisville, Kentucky, when their DH.4, U.S. Army Air Service serial number not recorded, crashes while making a sharp banking turn. Airframe destroyed by post-crash fire. The men were airborne to photograph the airshow that was to shortly begin. The aircraft was assigned to the 7th Photo Section at Godman Field, Camp Knox, Kentucky.

23 September
A Martin NBS-1 bomber, Air Service 68487, Raymond E. Davis, pilot, nose dived and crashed from an estimated altitude of 500 feet on a residential street near Mitchel Field, Mineola, New York, killing the six military personnel on board. At the time, the aircraft was involved in a night time war game display that was lit by searchlights and watched by an estimated crowd of 25,000 spectators.

October
Hangar fire at Martlesham Heath, Great Britain, destroys a number of captured aircraft from the Great War.

14 October
The Navy-Wright NW-1, BuNo A-6543, a racer designed and built in a mere three months, flew for the first time on 11 October 1922, just days before it was entered in 14 October 1922 Pulitzer air race at Selfridge Field, Michigan. Entered at the last minute, the press dubbed the new entry, the Mystery Racer. Assigned to the second of three heats, and wearing race number 9, the close-fitting cowling over the Wright T-2 engine retained heat and caused the oil temperature to exceed its operating limit. Streaming smoke around the race course, the pilot was over Lake St. Clair, near Detroit when the red-hot engine failed. "The extreme low position of the lower wing was not conducive to ditching and the "Mystery Racer" flipped over and sank in the mud. The aircraft was written-off but the pilot emerged unscathed."

17 October
U.S. Army's largest blimp, C-2, caught fire shortly after being removed from its hangar at Brooks Field, San Antonio, Texas for a flight. Seven of eight crew aboard were injured, mostly in jumping from the craft. This accident was made the occasion for an official announcement by the Army and the Navy that the use of hydrogen would be abandoned "as speedily as possible." On 23 September 1922, the C-2 had completed the first transcontinental airship flight across the United States, from Langley Field, Virginia, to Ross Field, Arcadia, California, under the command of Major H. A. Strauss after having started on 14 September. The ship arrived at Ross Field on 23 September,

22 October
1st Lt. Harold Ross Harris (1897–1988) becomes the first member of the U.S. Army Air Service to save his life by parachute, when the Loening PW-2A, (probably AS-64388), he is testing out of McCook Field, Ohio, suffers vibration, loses part of left wing or aileron, so he parts company with the airframe, landing safely. Two sources gives the date as 20 October. McCook Field personnel create the "Caterpillar Club" for those whose lives are saved by parachute bail-out with Harris the plank-holding member.

11 November
1st Lt. Frank B. Tyndall is the second U.S. Army Air Service pilot to utilize a parachute in a life-saving effort when the Boeing-built MB-3A, (probably AS-68380) he is testing at Seattle, Washington sheds its wings in flight almost directly over the Boeing factory. He would later perish on 15 July 1930 in the crash of Curtiss P-1F Hawk, 28–61, near Mooresville, North Carolina. Tyndall Air Force Base is named in his honor.

12 November
"HARTFORD, Conn., Nov. 12. - Lieut. John Blaney, army flier, from Mitchel Field, Long Island, was instantly killed this afternoon at Brainard Municipal field here while taking part in an airplane relay in the Hartford aviation meet. His plane struck a tree and crashed when about to land. Lieutenant Blaney was completing the third of the race, and flew close to the ground. He was flying about 140 miles an hour when the plane hit the tree. He was instantly killed." He was flying Atlantic DH.4M-2, AS-63626, of the 5th Observation Squadron.

12 November
Lt. Cdr. Godfrey DeCourcelles Chevalier, a graduate of the U.S. Naval Academy in June 1910, who was appointed a Naval Air Pilot No. 7 on 7 November 1915 and a Naval Aviator No. 7 on 7 November 1918, crashes in a Vought VE-7 while en route from NAS Norfolk to Yorktown, Virginia, dying in Portsmouth Naval Hospital on 14 November as a result of his injuries. On 26 October 1922 Lieutenant Commander Chevalier made the first landing on the USS Langley's deck, the U.S. Navy's first aircraft carrier, in an Aeromarine 39-B, A-606.

6 December
"NEWPORT NEWS, Va., Dec. 6. - Major Guy L. Gearhart, of Leavenworth, Kan., Captain Benton A. Doyle, of St. Louis, and four enlisted men were killed today in a collision between a Martin bomber and a Fokker scout plane, 250 feet above the Hampton Normal School farm, which adjoins Langley field. The machines burst into flames and were destroyed, and several men who attempted to rescue the men pinned beneath the wreckage were severely burned. The bomber, piloted by Captain Doyle, took the air to lead a formation of six planes and was 'banking' when the scout machine, in charge of Major Gearhart, rose swiftly and hit it in the rear. The other machines already in the air maneuvered out of the way and effected safe landings. It was announced tonight that a board of inquiry would investigate the accident." Fokker D.VII, AS-7795, ex-German FF7795/18, hit Martin NBS-1, AS-68491.

7 December
DH-4B, AS-63780, departs Rockwell Field, San Diego, California at 0905 hrs. bound for Fort Huachuca, Arizona, piloted by 1st Lt. Charles L. Webber with Col. Francis C. Marshall, attached to the staff of the chief of cavalry in Washington, D.C., aboard for an inspection trip of cavalry posts and camps. When aircraft doesn't arrive, one of the largest man-hunts in Air Service history is mounted, directed by Col. A. J. McNabb Jr., commanding officer of the 25th Infantry, but when search is finally given up on 23 February 1923 nothing had been found. Wreckage is eventually discovered 12 May 1923 by a man hunting stray cattle in the mountains. Flight apparently hit Cuyamaca Peak just a few miles east of San Diego in fog within thirty minutes of departure.

== 1923 ==
4 March
Martin GMT (Glenn Martin Transatlantic), USAAS 62949, (as identified in a 1972 article in Wings magazine) loses power on one of two Liberty engines while en route to Chanute Field, Illinois, is unable to stay aloft on one only, crashes. Pilot Maj. Bradley escapes injury, but Lt. Stanley Smith is fatally injured. Walt Boynes's account in Wings magazine gives the accident date as 5 March. A period report from the Associated Press states, however,: "NEW YORK, March 4. - Lieut. Stanley Smith, army air service, was killed and Maj. Follett Bradley was probably fatally injured when a giant Martin bomer [sic] in which they had just left Mitchell Field [sic] for Chanute Field, Rantoul, Ills. [sic], was forced down in Brooklyn. Four student mechanics, privates, who also were in the biplane escaped with only slight injuries owing to the skillful manner in which Major Bradley piloted the big bomer [sic] to earth from 5,000 feet. The two officers were pinned under a wing of the machine, which, brought to earth on wheels, overturned when it struck a hillock. The mishap was due to a broken controlling rod." The Aviation Archeology site report matches the accident date, lists the pilot as Major Follett Bradley Sr., identifies the Martin as AS-62951, and gives the crash site as Miller Street and Heigeman Avenue, Brooklyn, N.Y. Joe Baugher's serial number website adds that the aircraft had been modified to a Martin GMC with a 37-mm cannon in the nose, and that it carried McCook Field project number P110.
12 April
Capt. Hugh J. Knerr, commanding officer of the 88th Observation Squadron, Wright Field, Ohio, and Sgt. John McKenna, returning to Fairfield Air Depot, Ohio, from a reconnaissance flight, suffer a stuck valve on the Liberty engine of Airco DH.4B, USAAS 64566, while hedge-hopping, duck under powerlines directly ahead, and crash-land in a rough pasture near Richmond, Indiana. Plane takes out ~100 feet of wire fence and strikes a cherry tree, shedding its lower wings and undercarriage, resulting in it being written off. Pilot Knerr suffers a strained neck. Investigation shows that "the accident was unavoidable and through no fault of the pilot." Knerr will medically retire from the U.S. Air Force in 1939 with the rank of major general.

21 April
Capt. Walter Ralls "Tiny" Lawson Sr. (b. 23 October 1893) is killed along with four other crew when his Martin MB-2 bomber, 64205, of the 20th Bombardment Squadron, 2d Bombardment Group, crashes into the Great Miami River in high winds shortly after take off from McCook Field, Dayton, Ohio, the same aircraft he piloted with the 1st Provisional Air Brigade during bomb tests out of Langley Field that sank the former German battleship SMS Ostfriesland. The Army named the balloon landing facility at Fort Benning, in his home state of Georgia, Lawson Field in his honor in August 1931. After World War II the name of Second Lieutenant Ted W. Lawson was added to his, giving the parsimonious post war Army two memorials for the price of one. The second Lawson was author of Thirty Seconds Over Tokyo, a memoir of his experiences as a pilot on the historic World War II raid led by the first Lawson's fellow pilot in the 1st Provisional Air Brigade, Jimmy Doolittle. At the time of his death, the senior Lawson was commanding officer of the 20th Bombardment Squadron. A period account from the Associated Press: "DAYTON, O., April 21. - Four men were almost instantly killed and another probably fatally injured this afternoon when a Martin air service bombing plane nose-dived into the Great Miami river here. The dead are: Capt. W. R. Lawson, pilot, Langley Field, Va., Technical Sergeant Bidwell, Langley Field; Sergeant Wesley H. Rowland, Selfridge Field, Mich., and Civilian U. M. Smith, Bureau of Standards, Washington, D. C. The injured: Technical Sergeant F. B. Shaw, Selfridge Field, Mich. The accident happened as the men were taking off for Langley Field after having been here for several weeks. All the men in the plane had parachutes on their backs but were unable to use them because the plane was only a short distance from the ground when it dived. Brigadier General William Mitchell, assistant chief of the air service, and Major L. W. McIntosh, commandant at McCook Field, were the first air service officers to reach the scene. Shortly after the accident General Mitchell took off for Bolling Field, Washington, D. C. As he passed over the scene of the disaster he dropped flowers into the river."

31 July
RAF Bristol F.2B, E2431, crashes at RAF (Cadet) College, Cranwell, when it stalls during landing. Aircraft was marked incorrectly 1342E.
15 September
Major Edward L. Napier, a native of Union Springs, Alabama, is killed in the crash of a Fokker D.VII, AS-5382, at McCook Field, Dayton, Ohio. He had been a Medical Corps Officer in the Great War and had transferred to the Army Air Corps. He was receiving training as a flight surgeon at the time of his death. The official report states that he was piloting the aircraft himself and there was a structural failure of a wing. In 1941, the U.S. Army Air Corps will open Napier Field at Dothan, Alabama, named in his honor.

23 September
1st Lts. Robert Stanford Olmsted and John W. Shoptaw enter U.S. Army balloon S-6 in international balloon race from Brussels, despite threatening weather which causes some competitors to drop out. S-6 collides with Belgian balloon, Ville de Bruxelles on launch, tearing that craft's netting and knocking it out of the race. Lightning strikes S-6 over Nistelrode, the Netherlands, killing Olmsted outright, and Shoptaw in the fall. Switzerland's Génève is also hit, burns, killing two on board, as is Spain's Polar, killing one crew immediately, second crewman jumps from 100 feet, breaking both legs. Three other balloons are also forced down. Middletown Air Depot, Pennsylvania, was renamed Olmsted AFB on 11 March 1948.

18 November
The first aerial refueling-related fatality occurs during an air show at Kelly Field, Texas, when the fuel hose becomes entangled in the right wings of the refueler and the receiver aircraft. The Army Air Service pilot of the refueler, Lt. P. T. Wagner, is killed in the ensuing crash of DH-4B, 23-444.

23 November
First of only three Bristol Jupiter Fighters, essentially adaptations of the Bristol F.2B airframe converted with 425 hp (317 kW) Bristol Jupiter IV engines and oleo-type undercarriage, crashes due to an engine seizure at high altitude. Second conversion was sold to Sweden in May 1924, and third was converted to a dual-control trainer.

30 November
Second of two prototypes of the Short Springbok Mk. I, J6975, crashes near Martlesham when it spins in shortly after take off, killing the pilot. Cause is diagnosed as rudder blanking during spinning and a new wing design is prepared for the Short Springbok Mk. II, of which six examples – later reduced to three – are ordered in 1924.

21 December
The French Navy airship Dixmude, formerly the German LZ114, is lost over the Mediterranean in a storm in early morning with the loss of all 44 of her crew.

== 1924 ==
16 January
While moored at NAS Lakehurst, New Jersey, USS Shenandoah's upper tail fin covering is ripped during a gale, and the sudden roll tears out her mooring tube from the Lakehurst mast. Damage to the nose deflates the first gas bag and holes the second. Zeppelin test pilot Anton Heinen rides out the storm and lands safely while the airship is being blown backwards. A period of repair is needed, not returning to service until 24 May 1924 (with reinforcements to the mooring assembly, nose, and fins), and a proposed Arctic expedition is scrapped.

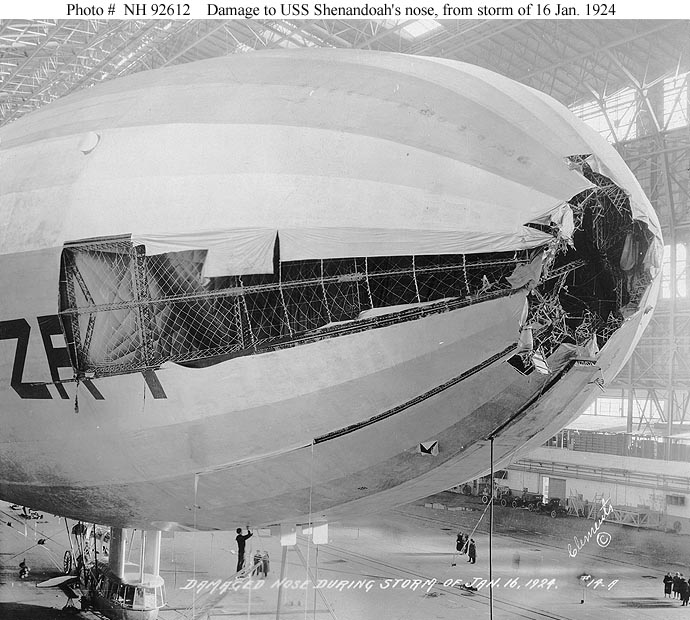
ZR-1's bow following the January storm.

23 February
Lt. John S. Ansley of the 111th Observation Squadron, Texas National Guard, crashes in Curtiss JN-4H, 24-158, (one source gives the type as a Curtiss JN-6) at Ellington Field, Texas, when he enters a tailspin during practice, but at insufficient altitude to recover, the airframe smashing into a pile of stacked lumber. The pilot dies later in hospital.

21 March
Martin GMB (Glenn Martin Bomber), USAAS 64308, ex-Post Office (possibly 202), ends cross-country flight to Parris Island, South Carolina, noses over when it hits unmarked ditch on the airfield. Pilot 1st Lt. (later Lieutenant General) Harold L. George reported later that "I also remember being told that it (Parris Island) was an exceptional landing field. It was except that the information had failed to inform me that the Marines had dug a trench across the field. This was not indicated by markers, or in any other way. I didn't know the trench was there until we stopped quickly." Airframe had only logged 99 hours when it was written off.

27 March
British-born 2nd Lt. Oscar Monthan (1885–1924) is killed when his Martin NBS-1 bomber, AS-68448, of the 5th Composite Group, fails to clear baseball field backstop on take-off from Luke Field, Ford Island, Oahu, Hawaiian Islands. Davis-Monthan Landing Field, later Davis-Monthan Air Force Base, Tucson, Arizona, is named in part for him, 1 November 1925. He attended high school in that community.

30 April
One of the four Douglas World Cruiser aircraft, the "Seattle", 23-1229, c/n 145, attempting an around-the-globe flight in stages, crashes into a mountain in Alaska on this date. The crew, Major Frederick L. Martin and Staff Sergeant Alva L. Harvey, survive and make their way through the wilderness to safety. The wreckage of the "Seattle" is later recovered and is now on display in the Alaska Aviation Heritage Museum.

2 June
Assisting the U.S. Weather Bureau in research, the USAAS Balloons and Airship School schedules fifteen balloon flights from Scott Field, Illinois, for Dr. C. LeRoy Meisinger, who had gained experience with balloons and meteorology as an Air Service officer during the war. The project ends with the tenth flight, this date, when lightning strikes the balloon, killing both Dr. Meisinger and his pilot, 1st Lt. James M. G. T. Neely.

2 August
One of the three surviving Douglas World Cruiser aircraft, the "Boston", 23-1231, c/n 147, loses oil pressure while flying west over the North Atlantic, has to alight on the open sea. Crew is rescued, but during an attempt to tow the float aircraft by the USS Richmond, the aircraft capsizes in rough seas and has to be abandoned near the Faroe Islands.

15 September
A Curtiss N-9 seaplane, equipped with radio control and without a human pilot aboard, was flown on a 40-minute flight at the Naval Proving Grounds, Dahlgren, Virginia. Although the aircraft sank from damage sustained while landing, this test demonstrated the practicability of radio control of aircraft.

10 October
U.S. Army blimp TC-2 explodes over Newport News, Virginia, when a bomb it is carrying detonates. Two of five crew killed. "WASHINGTON, Oct. 10 – Lieutenant Bruce Martin of San Francisco was seriously injured with four other army men when the army blimp TC-2 was forced to the ground by the explosion of one of its bombs at Langley Field, Virginia." "NEWPORT NEWS, Va., Oct. 10 – Lieutenant Bruce H. Martin died at midnight as a result of injuries sustained at Langley Field this morning when a bomb carried by the U. S. Army blimp TC2 prematurely exploded, wrecking the craft and injuring the five members of its crew."

10 October
The rear section of USS Shenandoah is damaged while making a landing in windy conditions at Naval Air Station North Island, San Diego, California, after completing the second leg of a cross-country flight from Fort Worth, Texas. "Slight damage was done to the Shenandoah when the airship was brought to the ground last night. Officers at North Island this morning stated that one of the rear gondolas struck the ground slightly, but with sufficient force to strain two of the girders in the aft portion. The damage, it was said, is not serious, but on account of the mountains to be flown over on the flight to Camp Lewis, it was deemed best to make thorough tests to avoid any possibility of accident." "The work of repairing the strained girders continued all day yesterday (13 October)."

11 October
"PHILADELPHIA, Oct. 11 – Flying in excess of 150 miles an hour, the United States navy racing seaplane FTW fell 100 feet into the Delaware river [sic] today and was completely wrecked. The pilot, badly injured, extricated himself." This was actually the Wright F2W-2, A7644, which suffered from poor handling characteristics, the tremendous torque of its huge Wright T-3 Tornado liquid-cooled engine flipping the racer onto its back on landing during its first and only flight.

16 October
Emergency use of parachute — Following a mid-air collision over Coronado, California, Gunner William M. Coles, USN, of VF-1, made a successful emergency parachute jump from his Curtiss JN-4.

20 October
RAF Vickers Virginia Mk II J6856 of 7 Squadron is severely damaged in a force landing at Bishop's Stortford, Hertfordshire following an engine failure. The aircraft is subsequently repaired and returned to service.

18 November
"LAGUNA BEACH, Nov. 19. - Rescued from rough seas by two men in a rowboat when their seaplane landed 100 yards off of the rocky shores here, Lieutenants Douglas Powell and Charles Haltline of the U. S. S. New Mexico are recovering from exposure and shock. One of the rescuers, who arose from a sick bed to aid the officers, is seriously ill, suffering from a relapse and exposure." The Associated Press reported: "SAN DIEGO, Nov. 18. - Lieutenants Douglas Powell and Charles G. Halpine, naval aviators, were rescued this evening off Laguna Beach, according to telephone messages from that place. The aviators left this city late today to fly to the battleship New Mexico at San Pedro. Off Laguna Beach Lieutenant Powell's machine, just repaired at North Island, developed engine trouble and Powell was forced to descend to the ocean. Lieutenant Halpine came down to aid him and managed to get a tow line to him. Darkness, however, set in and the two officers, not knowing exactly where they were, were forced to stop when they neared the breakers. There they shouted for help and the shout was heard by residents of the beach who assembled a battery of automobiles on a bluff and trained headlights on the aviators while two beach residents went out in a lifeboat and got the officers to shore." They were probably flying Vought UO-1 observation planes, which replaced other types aboard catapult equipped cruisers and battleships from 1923.

== See also ==
- List of accidents and incidents involving military aircraft
