= Edward Busk =

Edward Busk may refer to:

- Edward Henry Busk (1844–1926), Vice Chancellor of London University
- Edward Teshmaker Busk (1886–1914), English pioneer of early aircraft design
