= William Davidson Bissett =

Recipient of the Victoria Cross

- William Davidson Bissett VC in 1918
- Born: 17 August 1893; St Martins, Perthshire
- Died: 12 May 1971 (aged 77); Wrexham, Wales
- Burial place: Aldershot Military Cemetery (Cremated in Pentre Bychan, Wrexham)
- Military career
- Allegiance: United Kingdom
- Branch: British Army
- Rank: Major
- Units: Argyll and Sutherland Highlanders; Royal Army Ordnance Corps; Royal Pioneer Corps
- Conflicts: World War I World War II
- Awards: Victoria Cross; Croix de Guerre avec Palme (France)

Major William Davidson Bissett VC (7 August 1893 – 12 May 1971) was a Scottish recipient of the Victoria Cross, the highest and most prestigious award for gallantry in the face of the enemy that can be awarded to British and Commonwealth forces.

== Early life ==
Bissett was born at St Martins, Perthshire, on 7 August 1893. He was the elder son of John Bissett, a plumber, and Helen Davidson Bissett, of 18 Strathmore Street, Bridgend, Perthshire.

== Military career ==
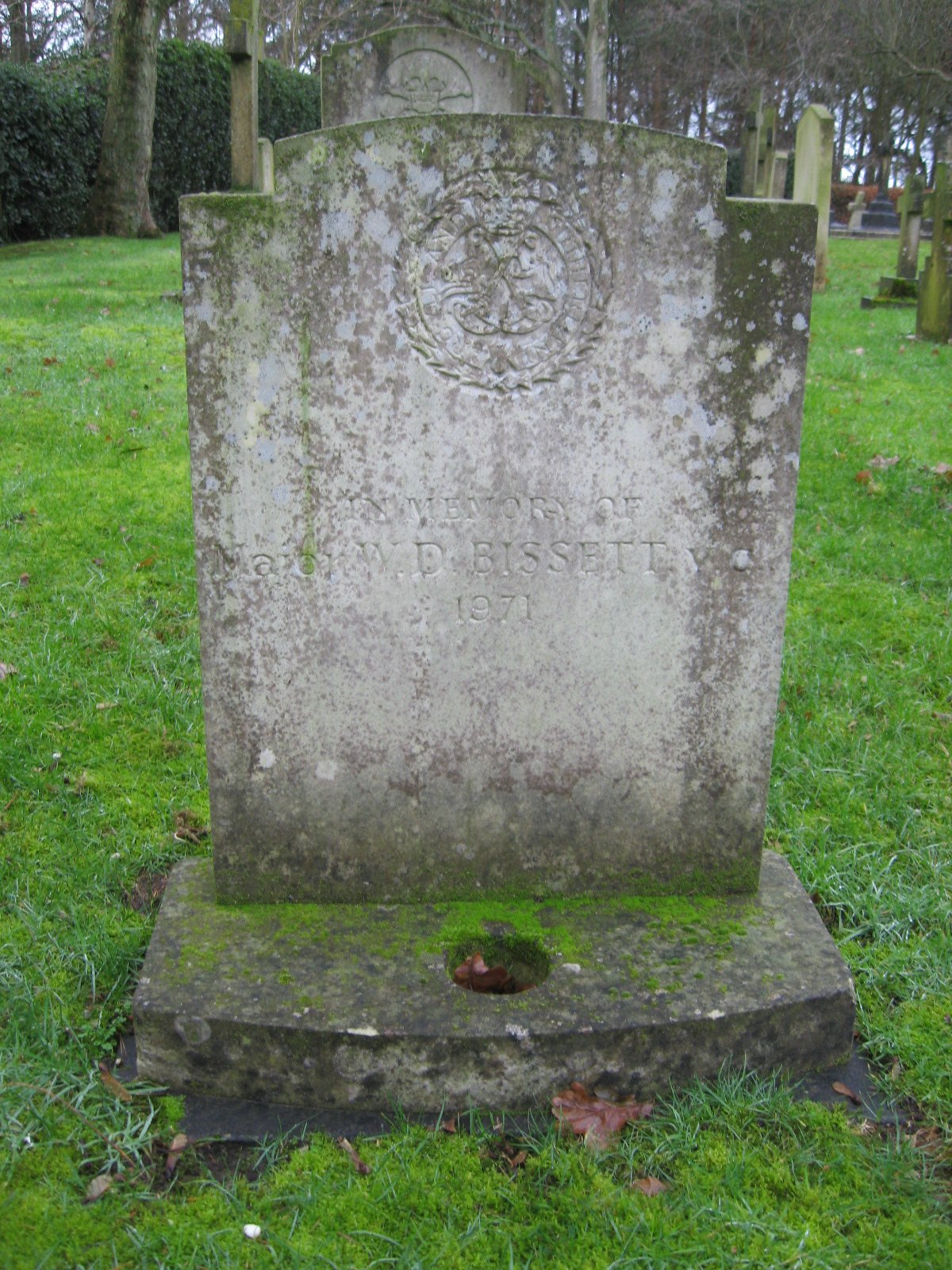
Bissett's grave in Aldershot Military Cemetery

Bissett was commissioned second lieutenant in the Argyll and Sutherland Highlanders on 19 December 1916.

He was a 25 year old, lieutenant in the 1/6th Battalion, The Argyll and Sutherland Highlanders (Princess Louise's), British Army during the First World War when the following deed took place for which he was awarded the VC:

"On 25 October 1918 east of Maing, France, Lieutenant Bissett was commanding a platoon, but owing to casualties took command of the company and handled it with great skill when an enemy counter-attack turned his left flank. Realising the danger he withdrew to the railway, but the enemy continued to advance and when the ammunition was exhausted Lieutenant Bissett mounted the railway embankment under heavy fire and, calling for a bayonet charge, drove back the enemy with heavy loss and again charged forward, establishing the line and saving a critical situation."

He was also awarded the French Croix de Guerre, in December 1919.

During the Second World War, Bissett served with the Royal Army Ordnance Corps and Royal Pioneer Corps, and was granted the honorary rank of major on retirement in September 1945.

Bissett died in Wrexham on 12 May 1971. After cremation, his ashes were buried in Aldershot Military Cemetery in Aldershot Military Town, Hampshire, England.

His Victoria Cross is displayed at the Argyll and Sutherland Highlanders Museum in Stirling Castle, Scotland.

== Bibliography ==
- Monuments to Courage (David Harvey, 1999)
- The Register of the Victoria Cross (This England, 1997)
- Scotland's Forgotten Valour (Graham Ross, 1995)
- Gliddon, Gerald (2014) [2000]. The Final Days 1918. VCs of the First World War. Stroud, Gloucestershire: History Press. ISBN 978-0-7509-5368-9.
