= George Armand Furse =

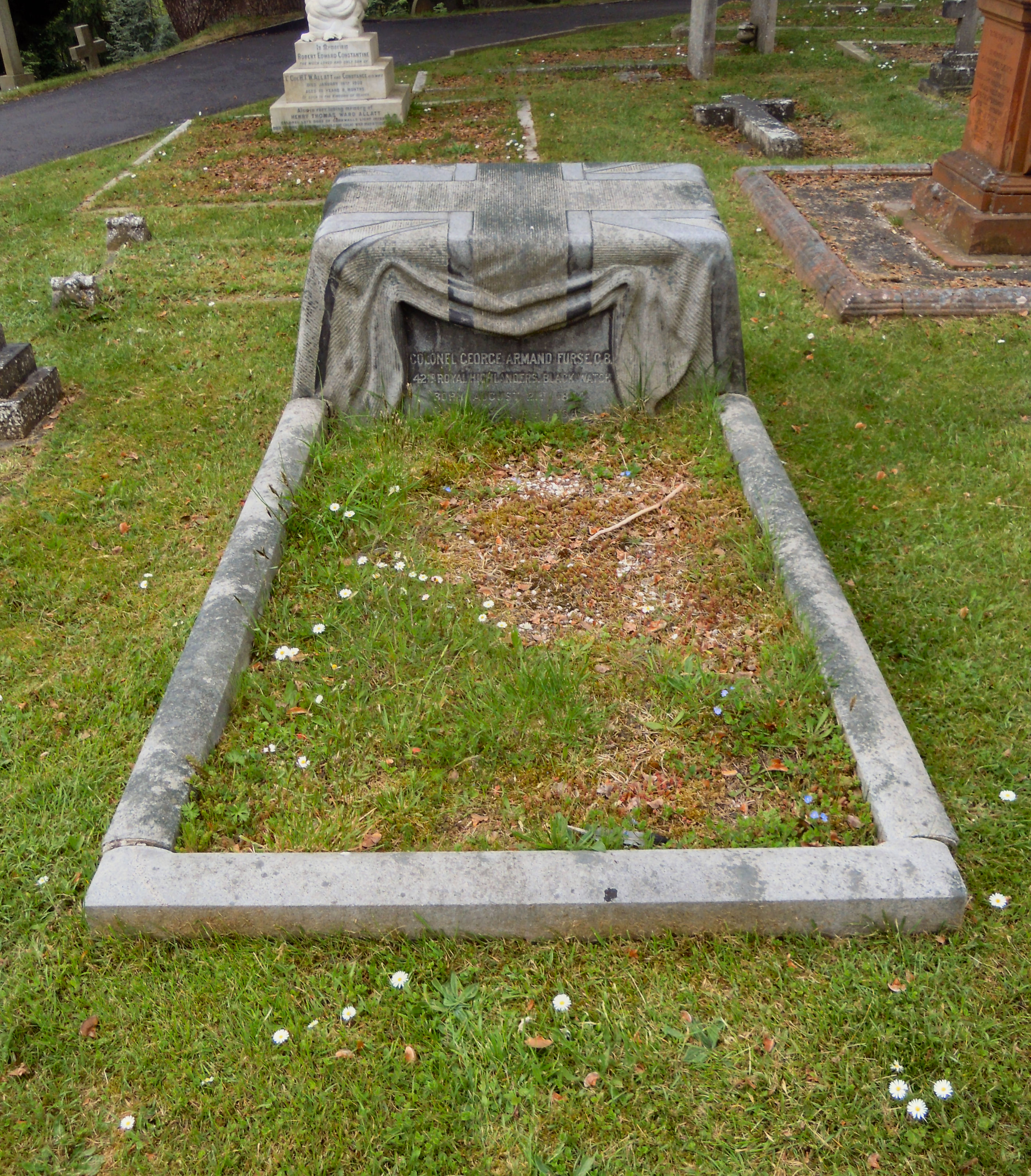
The grave of George Armand Furse in Aldershot Military Cemetery

Colonel George Armand Furse CB (23 August 1834 – 3 April 1906) was a British Army officer and author.

He was a colonel in the 42nd Royal Highlanders Black Watch and author of The Art of Marching (1901), Information in War: its Acquisition and Transmission (1895), Mobilization and Embarkation of an Army Corps (1883), Military Expeditions beyond the Seas (1897), Provisioning Armies in the Field (1899), and Marengo and Hohenlinden (1903). His 1883 book The Line of Communication was republished in 2008 by Kessinger Publishing

Furse is buried at Aldershot Military Cemetery. His great niece Aileen Armanda Furse married noted Russian spy Kim Philby.
