= Mervyn Butler =

British Army general (1913–1976)

General Sir Mervyn Butler KCB CBE DSO* MC
- General Sir Mervyn Butler in 1967
- Born: 1 July 1913
- Died: 3 January 1976 (aged 62)
- Burial place: Aldershot Military Cemetery
- Military career
- Allegiance: United Kingdom
- Branch: British Army
- Service years: 1933–1976
- Rank: General
- Service number: 58182
- Units: South Lancashire Regiment; Parachute Regiment; Suffolk Regiment
- Commands: Army Strategic Command; I (British) Corps; Staff College, Camberley; 2nd Division; 16th Independent Parachute Brigade
- Conflicts: Second World War; Cyprus Emergency; Suez Crisis
- Awards: Knight Commander of the Order of the Bath; Commander of the Order of the British Empire; Distinguished Service Order & Bar; Military Cross; Mentioned in Despatches

General Sir Mervyn Andrew Haldane Butler, KCB, CBE, DSO & Bar, MC (1 July 1913 – 3 January 1976) was a British Army officer who served as Commander-in-Chief Strategic Command.

== Military career ==
Mervyn Butler was educated at St Columba's College, Rathfarnham, Ireland and at the Royal Military College, Sandhurst. He was commissioned as a second lieutenant into the South Lancashire Regiment on 4 February 1933 and was promoted to lieutenant on 2 February 1936. He was again promoted, this time to captain, on 2 February 1941. He transferred to the Parachute Regiment and served with distinction during the Second World War, being awarded both the Distinguished Service Order and the Military Cross for his services. He transferred to the Suffolk Regiment on 20 July 1946.

Butler commanded the 16th Independent Parachute Brigade from 1955 to 1957. During the Suez Crisis, elements of the 16th Independent Parachute Brigade led by Butler and a contingent of the Royal Tank Regiment set off south along the canal bank on 6 November 1956 to capture Ismailia. Just before midnight, Butler was ordered to stop on the hour, when a ceasefire would come into effect. This raised a difficulty. There were Egyptian forces ahead; the British column was in open desert with no defensible feature to hand. Butler compromised, advancing until 0:15 am on 7 November 1956 to reach El Cap, where he sited the 2nd Battalion of the Parachute Regiment, with supporting detachments. He was awarded a Bar to his Distinguished Service Order on 13 June 1957.

Butler was General Officer Commanding 2nd Division from 1962 to 1964.

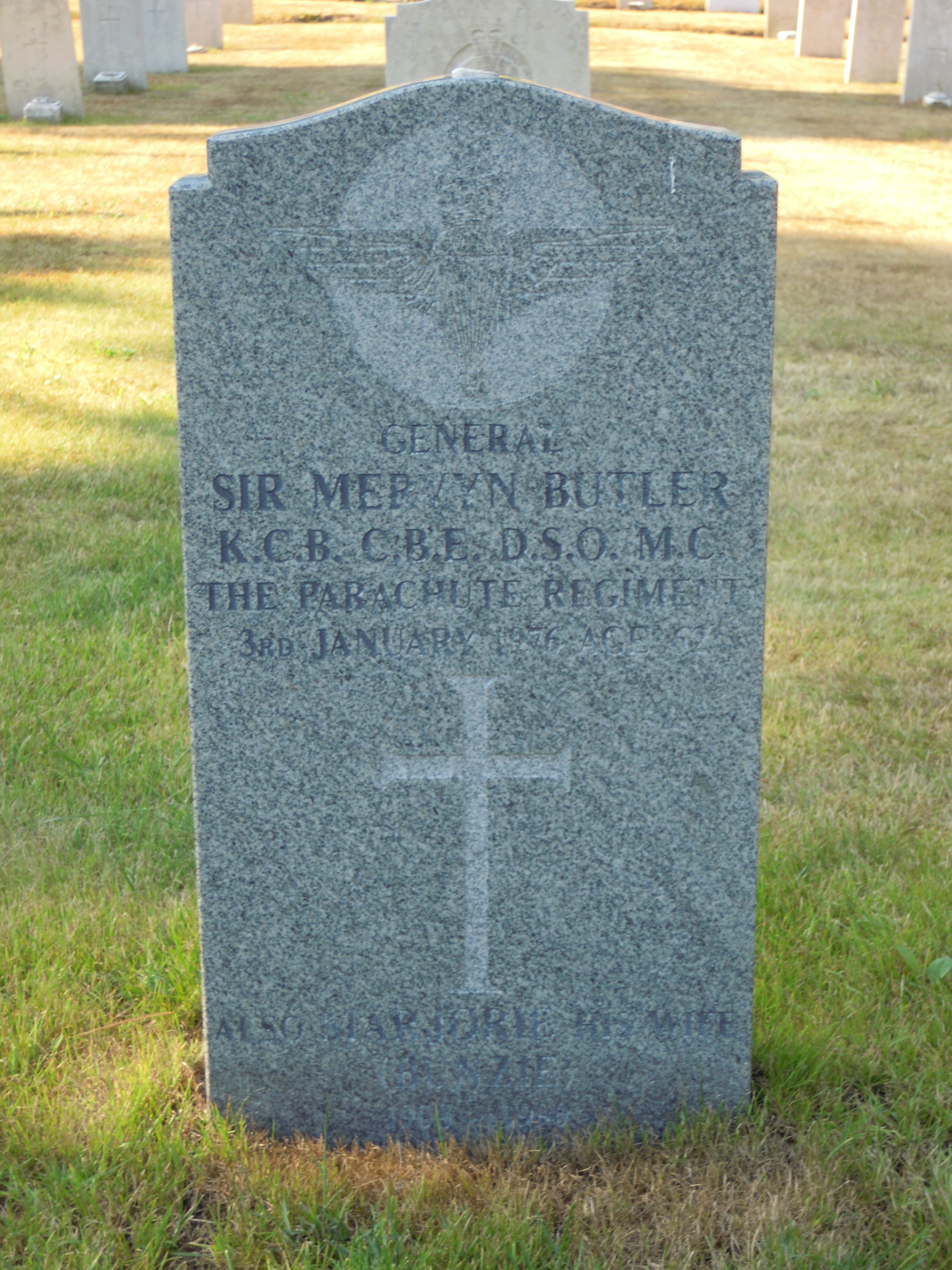
Butler's grave in Aldershot Military Cemetery

In 1964, Butler was appointed Assistant Chief of Defence Studies (Joint Warfare) and then in 1966 went on to be Commandant of the Staff College, Camberley. From 1968 to 1970, he was General Officer Commanding 1 (British) Corps. He was General Officer Commanding Army Strategic Command from 1970 to 1971 before going on to serve as Commandant of the Royal College of Defence Studies from January 1972 to 1973. He was promoted to general on 14 January 1972. He was also Colonel Commandant of the Parachute Regiment from 1967 to 1972.

Butler was appointed a Commander of the Order of the British Empire for service in Cyprus in 1957, a Companion of the Order of the Bath in the 1964 New Year Honours, and advanced to Knight Commander of the Order of the Bath in the 1968 New Year Honours.

On his death in 1976 Butler was buried in Aldershot Military Cemetery.

Military offices
Preceded by Alexander Williams	GOC 2nd Division; 1962–1964	Succeeded by Norman Wheeler
Preceded by John Worsley	Commandant of the Staff College, Camberley; 1966–1967	Succeeded by John Sharp
Preceded by Sir John Mogg	GOC 1st (British) Corps; 1968–1970	Succeeded by Sir John Sharp
Preceded by Sir John Mogg	GOC, Army Strategic Command; 1970–1971	Succeeded by Sir Frank King
Preceded by Alastair Buchan	Commandant of the Royal College of Defence Studies; 1972–1973	Succeeded by Sir Antony Read
