= Louisa Daniell =

Philanthropist

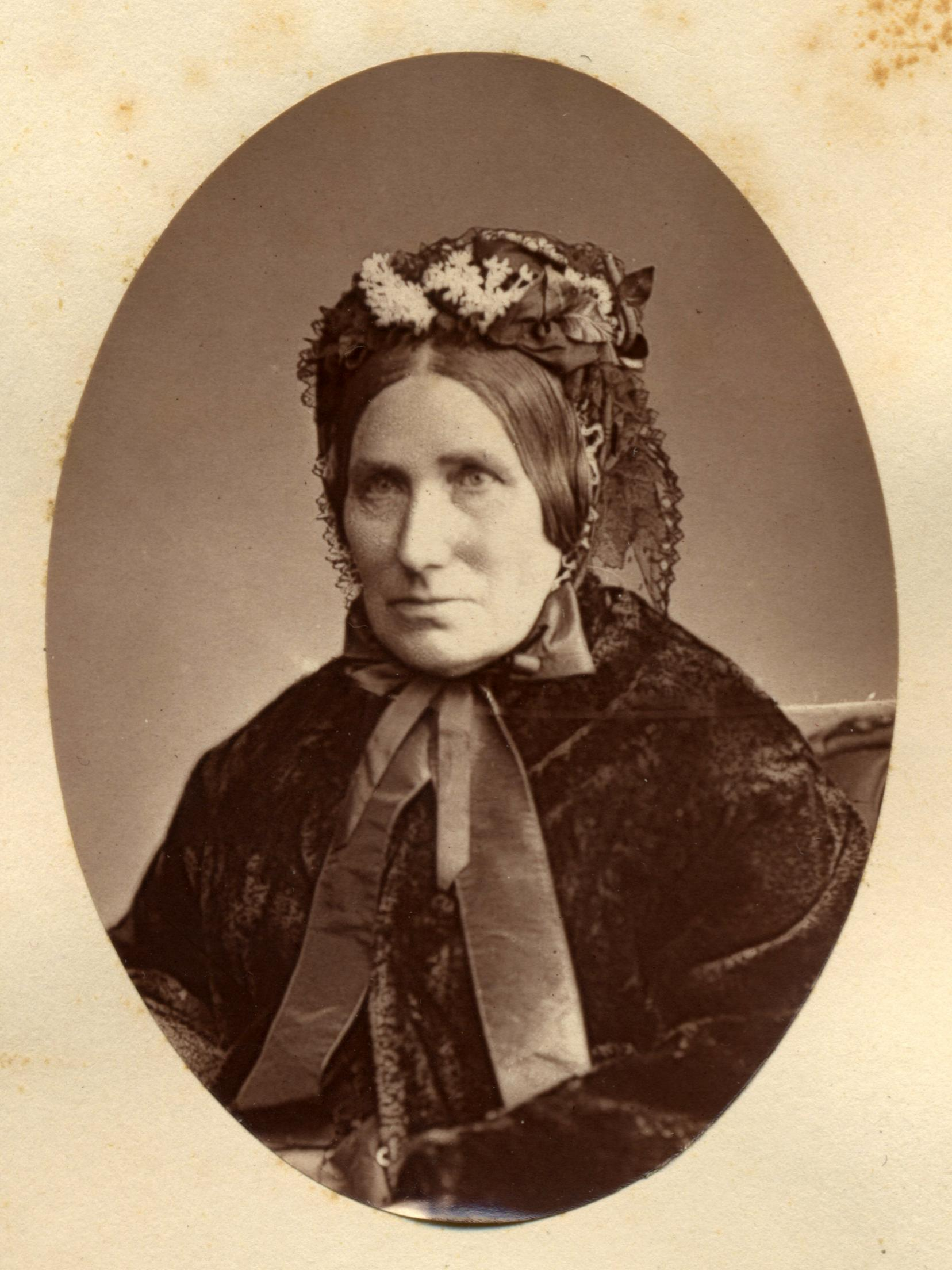
- Louisa Daniell in 1870
- Born: Louisa Drake c. 1809; Bath, Somerset, England
- Died: 16 September 1871; Great Malvern, England
- Occupation: philanthropist
- Children: 2, including Georgiana Fanny Shipley Daniell

Louisa Daniell (née Drake, c. 1809 – 16 September 1871) was a British philanthropist known for her work among the poor of The Midlands but most especially for her Soldiers' Home and Institute in the garrison town of Aldershot in the United Kingdom during the Victorian era.

== Early work ==
Daniell was born in Bath in Somerset in about 1809 and was orphaned soon after birth. A lonely child, she took comfort in religion.

On 29 May 1834 at Woodchester in Gloucestershire she married Lieutenant Frederick Daniell (1809-1837) of the 18th Madras Native Infantry, like herself a devout Christian. After marrying they went to India where they had two children. In India she held prayer meetings and distributed religious tracts.

On returning to England after the death of her husband in 1837 she moved to The Midlands to be near her son Frederick William Daniell who was being educated at Rugby School. Her daughter, Georgiana Fanny Shipley Daniell (1836–1894), who succeeded her mother in her philanthropic work at Aldershot, was educated at Brighton.

Deeply moved by the number of destitute vagrants she saw on the streets of Rugby, Daniell set up five missions in five years in the area which were largely financed by local gentry. In these she provided reading rooms and sewing classes and gave out religious tracts and held Bible readings in an attempt to oppose what she saw as the threat of Roman Catholicism.

== Move to Aldershot ==
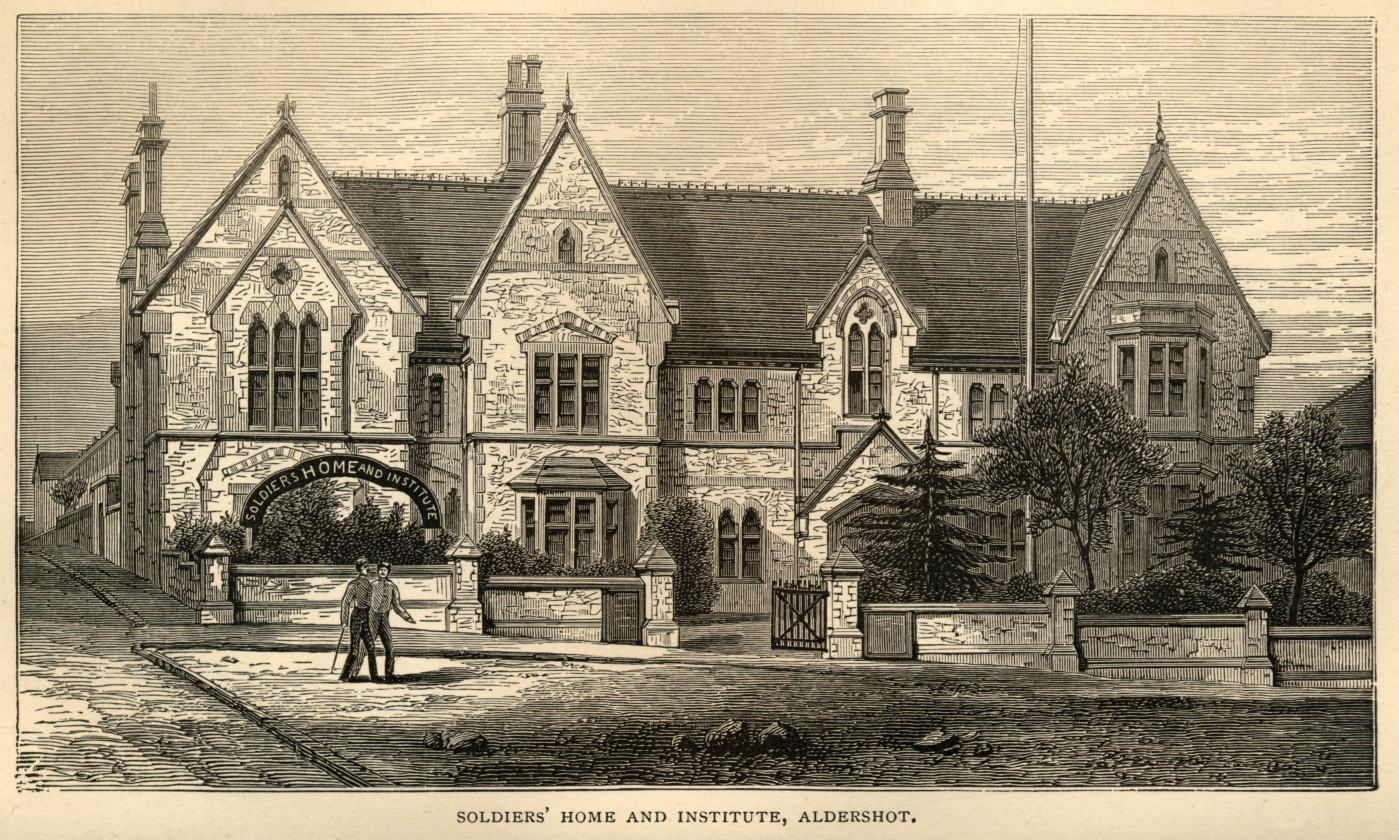
The Soldiers' Home and Institute in 1877

Miss Daniell's Soldiers' Home and Institute in 1910

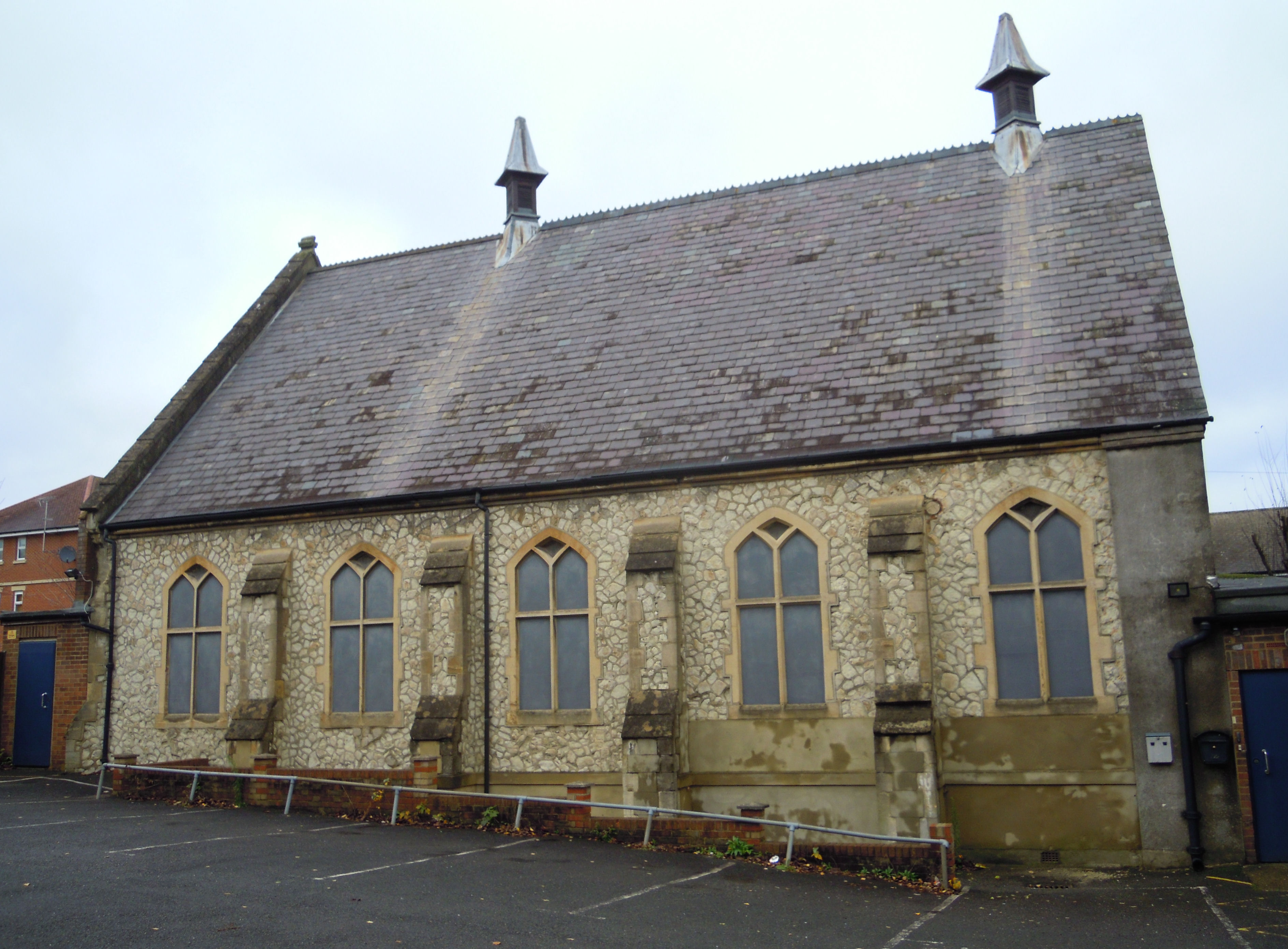
The Meeting Hall at the Soldiers' Home. All that is left of the original building - it is now the Aldershot Masonic Centre

In 1861, she and her daughter were living at Ventnor on the Isle of Wight. By the early 1860s her work at Rugby had brought Daniell to the notice of Mr. Wilson, the Secretary of the County Towns Mission Society, who implored her to "adopt Aldershot" and "work it in the same way as her existing mission stations."

Aldershot had few distractions for the 15,000 troops stationed there other than 18 canteens in the Camp where beer was served and 25 public houses and 47 beer houses in the town, most of which were also brothels where disease was rife. Daniell described Aldershot at this time as "one of Satan's strongholds".

Daniell and her daughter arrived in Aldershot in April 1862 with the intention of setting up a place of recreation and relaxation for soldiers other than the public houses and saloons. With the help and guidance of some of the evangelical philanthropists of the period including Lord Shaftesbury they rented a house in Artillery Terrace in October 1862 and fitted it up as a mission hall and reading room, providing recreation for soldiers in Aldershot out of concern for their spiritual needs and well-being.

The building of her permanent Mission Hall and Soldiers' Home and Institute situated on Barrack Road was commenced in February 1863 on a plot of land donated by local businessman Mr Eggar, being officially opened on 11 October 1863 by Lord Shaftesbury. This building was in the Elizabethan style and consisted of a lecture hall seating up to 500 for religious services, a tea and coffee bar, a smoking and games room, a reading room where newspapers were provided and a lending library in addition to a classroom capable of holding 150 people. Upstairs was the drawing room for use by officers and their families, while other rooms included a kitchen and living accommodation.

When the Home first opened it was not thought appropriate for ladies to make such a place their home and a Council of Management was appointed to run it consisting of officers and their wives, representatives from the town and a small staff of volunteers. This arrangement did not work and by 1864 Daniell and her daughter were back, and stayed for the rest of their lives. Her Total Abstinence Society was set up 1863 and within a year had 500 members, and while many lapsed either temporarily or permanently, it held regular meetings and awarded medals to men who kept the pledge.

In addition to the soldiers, Daniell endeavoured to help their wives also. At this time soldiers' wives were either "on the strength" meaning they had basic food and accommodation provided by the Army, or they were "off the strength" meaning they received nothing so their husbands had to provide for them from their low wages. This resulted in extreme poverty in Aldershot's West End where many of these women lived with their children. To help them Daniell organised Mothers’ Meetings and sewing classes where the women learned to sew clothes which they could then sell at the Mission Hall, enabling them to earn three or four shillings a week. Daniell also set up a weekly savings club for the wives where they could put aside small sums to pay for clothing, shoes and other essentials.

Daniell set up a “Band of Hope” for local children which provided activities and basic education. In 1868, she took over the vacant public house the Wellington Arms in the West End which had a dance hall which could be used as a schoolroom. Here between 50 and 60 children aged 6 to 12 years of age received a basic education in reading and writing, taught by women from the Mission Hall.

A large part of Miss Daniell's Soldiers' Home, located on Barrack Road in Aldershot, was demolished in 1958, leaving only three walls and the roof of the main hall where religious services were held. In 1962, the Aldershot Freemasons adopted and refurbished the building to serve as a Masonic hall. They hold a 99-year lease dating from November 1962,and today it serves as a meeting place for twelve Masonic lodges and associated organizations.

== Death ==
Daniell died on 16 September 1871 at the family home, Eastwick House in Great Malvern, where she was being treated for breast cancer. Her body lay in state at the Aldershot Mission Hall before being taken for burial at Aldershot Military Cemetery with an escort of Royal Engineers. She is one of the few civilians buried in Aldershot Military Cemetery.

== Legacy ==
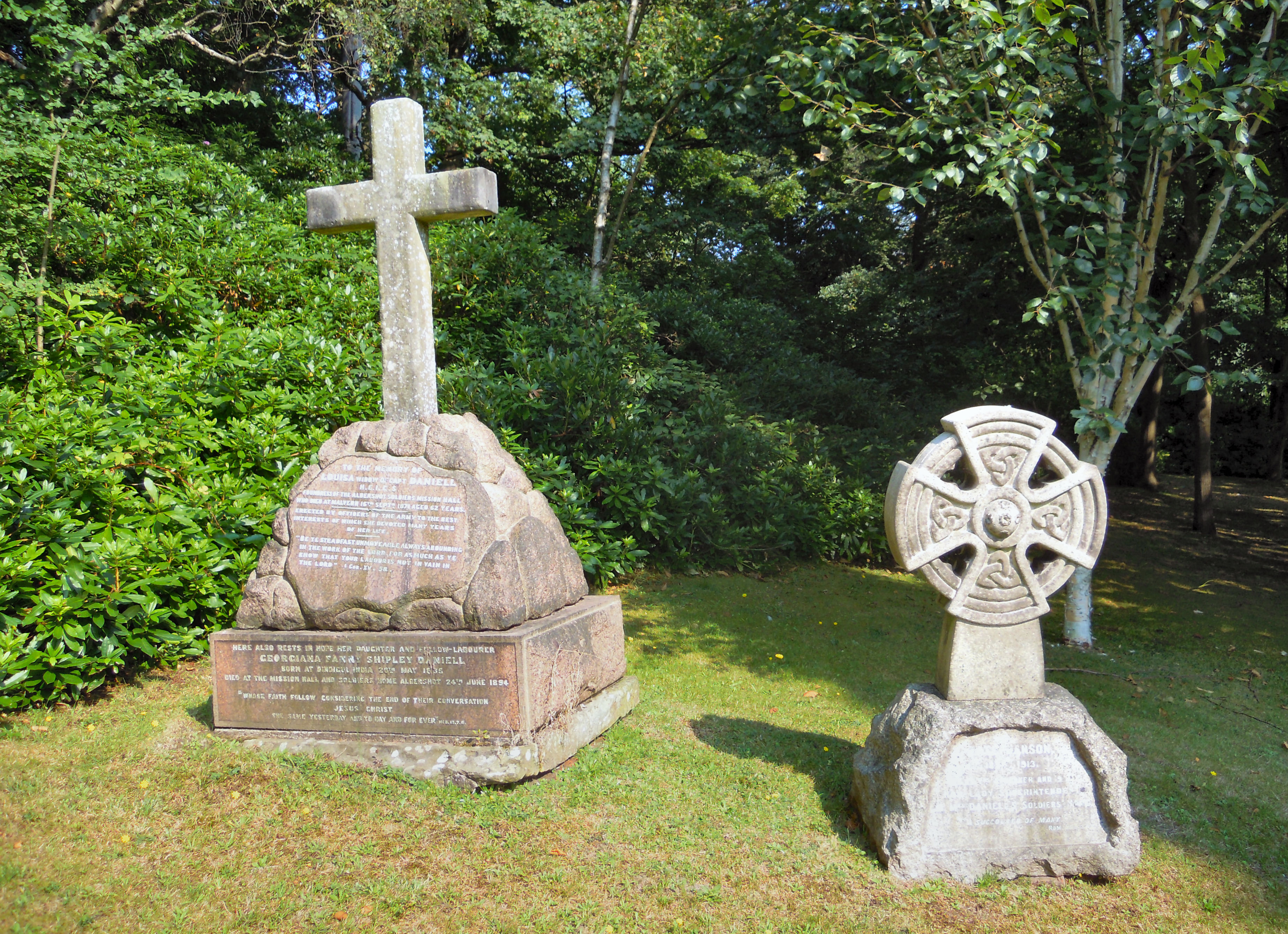
Grave of Mrs Louisa Daniell and Miss Georgina Daniell inAldershot Military Cemetery

Daniell's daughter Georgiana continued and expanded her mother's work and was nicknamed "the Soldiers' Friend." She raised £30,000 to open further Miss Daniell's Soldiers' Homes at Weedon (1873), Colchester (1873), Manchester (1874), Plymouth (1874), Chatham (1876) London (1890), Windsor (1891) and Okehampton (1891). She also published Aldershot: A Record of Mrs. Daniell's Work Amongst Soldiers, and Its Sequel in 1879.

When Georgiana Daniell died in 1894 she was buried with her mother in Aldershot Military Cemetery. They were granted permission to be buried there in recognition of their work for soldiers welfare.

== Continuation of the work ==
=== Georgiana Daniell ===
Georgiana Fanny Shipley Daniell (May 20, 1835 - June 24, 1894) was born in Madras, India, to Louisa Daniell and Captain Frederick Daniell. Accompanying her widowed mother in all the trials of her life, then in her work, she never married and was known as Miss Daniell in Aldershot.
