= Georgiana Fanny Shipley Daniell =

British philanthropist (1836–1894)

- Born: 20 May 1836; Madras, British India
- Died: 24 June 1894 (aged 58); Aldershot, Hampshire, England
- Burial place: Aldershot Military Cemetery
- Occupation: philanthropist
- Years active: 1862-1894
- Mother: Louisa Daniell

Georgiana Fanny Shipley Daniell (20 May 1836 – 24 June 1894) was a British philanthropist who was nicknamed "the Soldiers' Friend".

== Biography ==
Daniell was born in Madras in India to British parents Louisa Daniell (née Drake) and Captain Frederick Daniell. She was educated in Brighton and was a devout Christian.

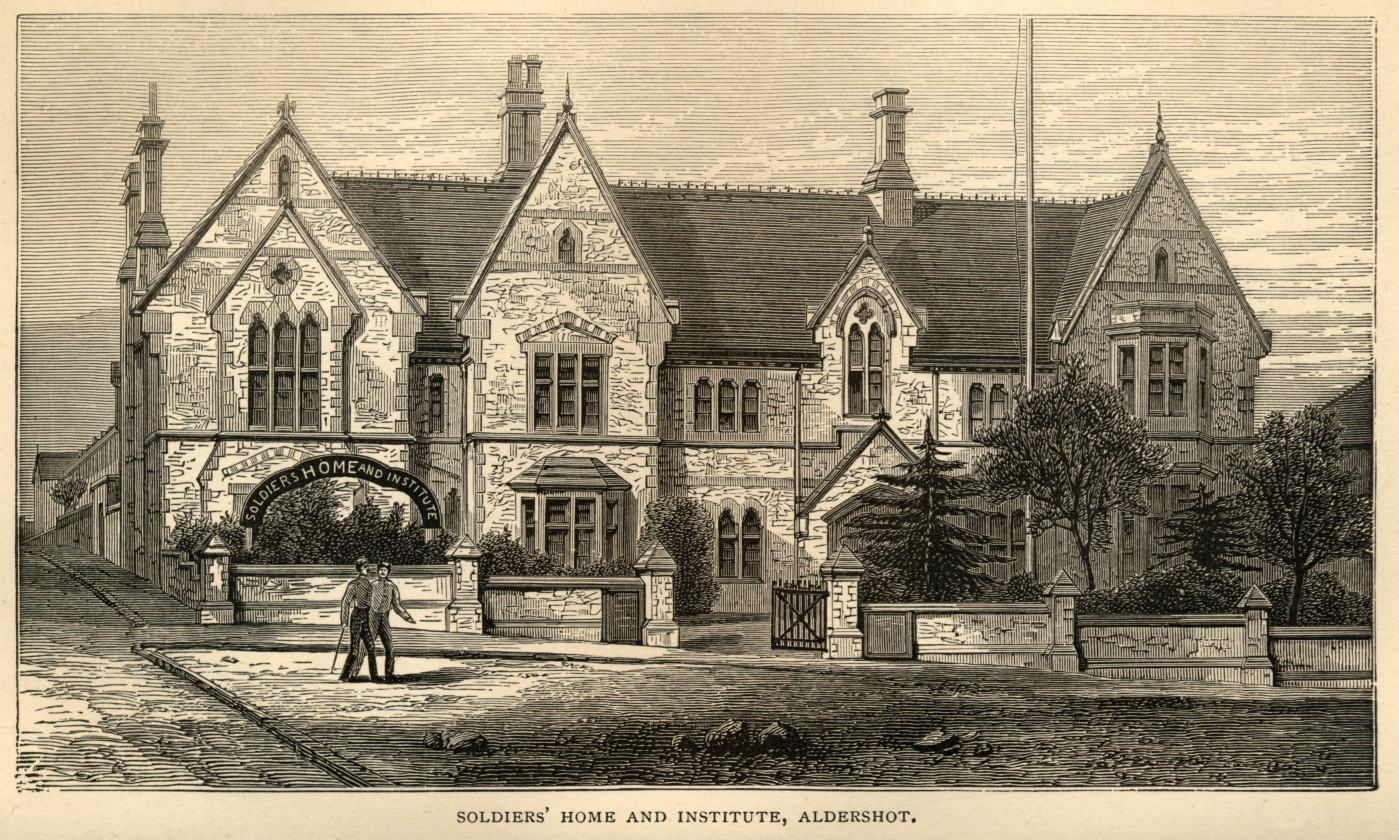
The Soldiers' Home and Institute at Aldershot in 1877

Louisa Daniell was known for her work among the poor of the Midlands, but mostly for her establishment of the Soldiers' Home and Institute in the garrison town of Aldershot in Hampshire. Daniel and her mother moved to Aldershot in 1862. After her mother died in 1871, Daniel continued her philanthropic work, working on the accounts and correspondence required to run the home at Aldershot. Daniell never married and was known as 'Miss Daniell' in Aldershot. She was assisted by Kate Hanson (1834–1913), one of the volunteer workers.

Daniell fundraised £30,000 to open new Miss Daniell's Soldiers' Homes across England at Weedon (1873), Colchester (1873), Manchester (1874), Plymouth (1874), Chatham (1876), London (1890), Windsor (1891) and Okehampton (1891). £4,000 was raised by public subscription in order to purchase the site for the London home. The homes had strict rules against alcohol, but did have a social dimension with social functions organised, a smoking and games room, a refreshments bar and a library.

Daniell also published Aldershot: A Record of Mrs. Daniell's Work Amongst Soldiers, and Its Sequel in 1879.

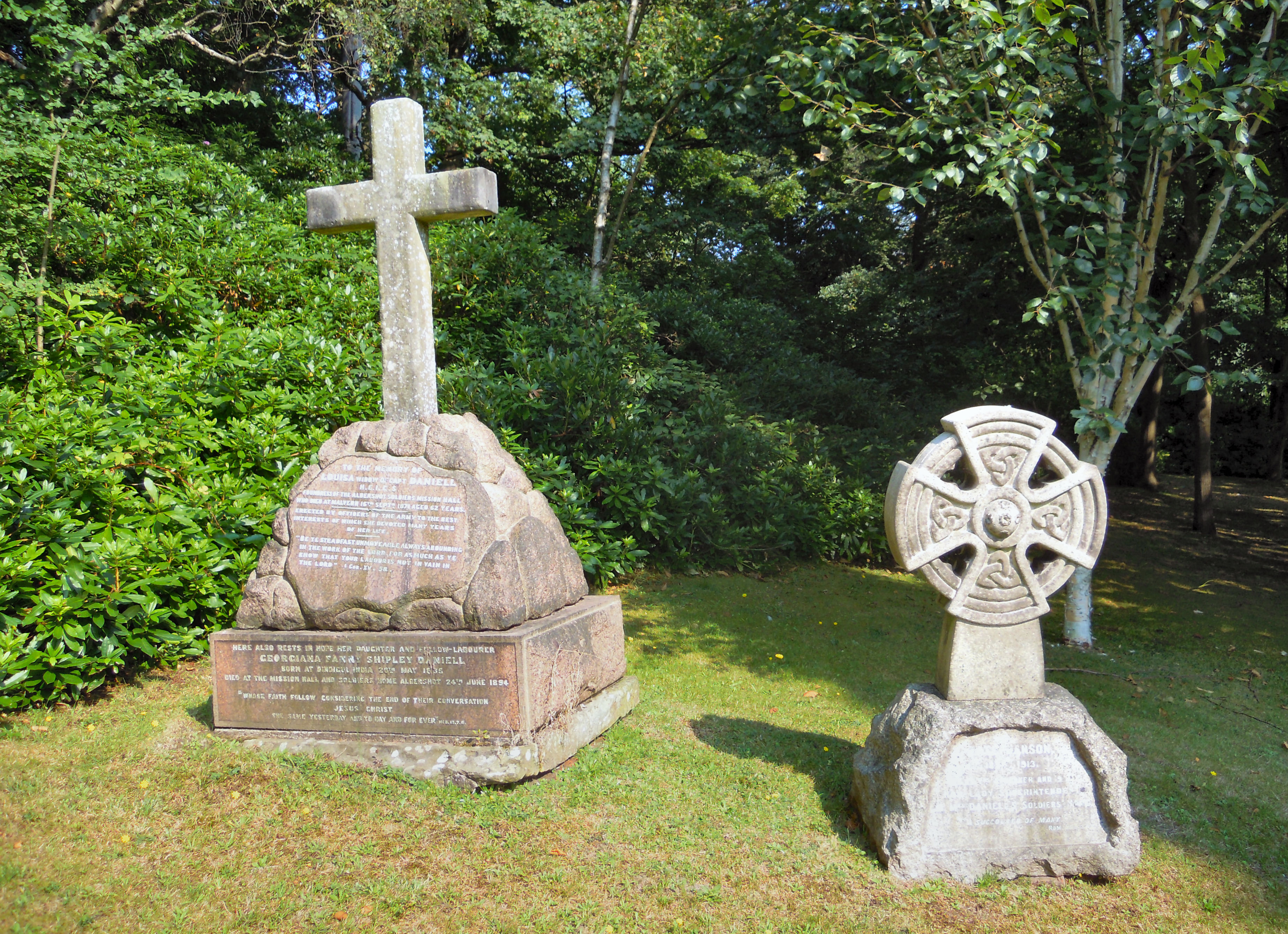
Grave of Louisa Daniell and Georgiana Daniell (left) and Kate Hanson (right) in Aldershot Military Cemetery

Daniell died of from an illness brought on by influenza at the Mission Hall and Soldiers' Home, Aldershot in 1894. On 29 June her coffin was carried on a gun carriage for burial with her mother in Aldershot Military Cemetery. They were granted permission to be buried there in recognition of their work for soldiers welfare.

Daniell's initiatives were replicated in Ireland by Elsie Sandes, who opened the first soldiers' home at Tralee in 1877, and by some churches. A new Soldiers’ Home, Havelock House, was built on the site of the former Mission Hall and Soldiers' Home and was opened by Elizabeth II in 1963 on the centenary of the opening original Miss Daniell's Soldiers' Home.
