= Aldershot Military Cemetery =

Cemetery in Aldershot, Hampshire, England

- Commonwealth War Graves Commission
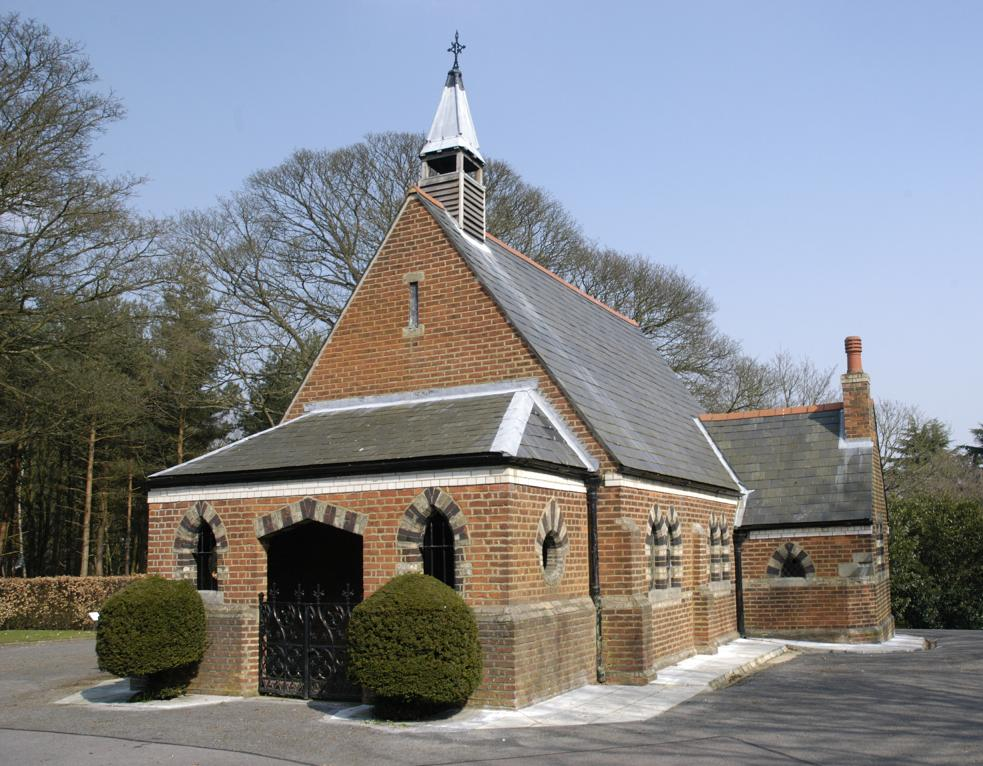
- The Mortuary Chapel of Aldershot Military Cemetery
- Used for those deceased 1855-Present
- Location: 51°15′19″N 0°44′49″W near Aldershot Military Town, Hampshire, England

Burials by war
- World War I: 692; World War II: 129

Aldershot Military Cemetery is a burial ground for military personnel, or ex-military personnel and their families, located in Aldershot Military Town, Hampshire.

The cemetery was created in 1850s by the Royal Engineers during the building of Aldershot military camp. Nearly 17,000 service personnel of nine nations are buried in the cemetery. There are 692 First World War graves; the earliest bears the date 5 August 1914, and the last 11 August 1921 (many of these graves are in plot AF). The 129 Second World War graves are in groups in various plots, the largest group in plot A containing 86 graves.

The cemetery remains in active use as a military cemetery run by Ministry of Defence, with the Commonwealth War Graves Commission maintaining the graves of the fallen for the First and Second World Wars. As of 2003 it is a Grade II* listed building.

== History ==
Aldershot Military Cemetery in 1910

In the early 1850s the British Army chose Aldershot as the location for a permanent training base. In November 1853 the Royal Engineers built two tented areas known then as "North Camp" and "South Camp". Although not officially enclosed until 1865, the land where the Cemetery is today had been laid out as a burial ground in the early days of the Army Camp and it is thought to have been used for burials as early as 1855. As the Cemetery is included on some of the early plans of the Camp, it is likely that it was designed and laid out by the Royal Engineers. The early Cemetery covered approximately the north-east half of the modern site on steeply sloping ground.

Initially located away from the main camps, the cemetery was bounded by Thorn Hill to the north, Round Hill to the east, and Peaked Hill to the south-west. To the west of the cemetery a small wooden chapel was constructed. It was not until 1875 that a central record of burials was created by the Royal Engineers (earlier records had been split amongst various camp churches).

The Protestant portion of the cemetery was consecrated by Samuel Wilberforce, the then Bishop of Winchester, on 1 November 1870. An extension was opened in 1879 which added land to the south-east to extend the grounds as far as Ordnance Road, and to the south-west onto Peaked Hill. The age of many of the mature trees suggests that the whole of the Cemetery grounds were planted at this time. The present brick-built Memorial Chapel replaced a wooden one that had burned down in 1879. The chapel's architect is not known but it was probably a member of the Royal Engineers who were responsible for the cemetery at the time it was built. The chapel is of relatively plain design, mostly of red brick but with black and white brick dressing, and a slate roof. The entrance porch is believed to be a later addition and has attractive wrought-iron gates.

Many of the early gravestones are of the Gothic cross design and date to the 1860s and 1870s, with one from 1864 being the earliest recorded. More recent stones tend to be in the style of the Commonwealth War Graves Commission. At the bottom of the slope towards Ordnance Road is a small section dedicated to children's graves, while also interred in the Cemetery are some civilians who worked with or for the Army, including the Christian missioner Mrs Louisa Daniell and her daughter Miss Daniell. In the centre is the Cross of Sacrifice, identical to those in all cemeteries cared for by the Commonwealth War Graves Commission. Buried here are almost 23,000 personnel with the burials divided into sections for different religious denominations. There are designated areas for the casualties of the two World Wars and the 1982 Falklands War. In the past there were designated areas for officers and other ranks, but that no longer applies. The site remains in active use as a Military Cemetery under the ownership and management of the Ministry of Defence (Army).

== Present day ==
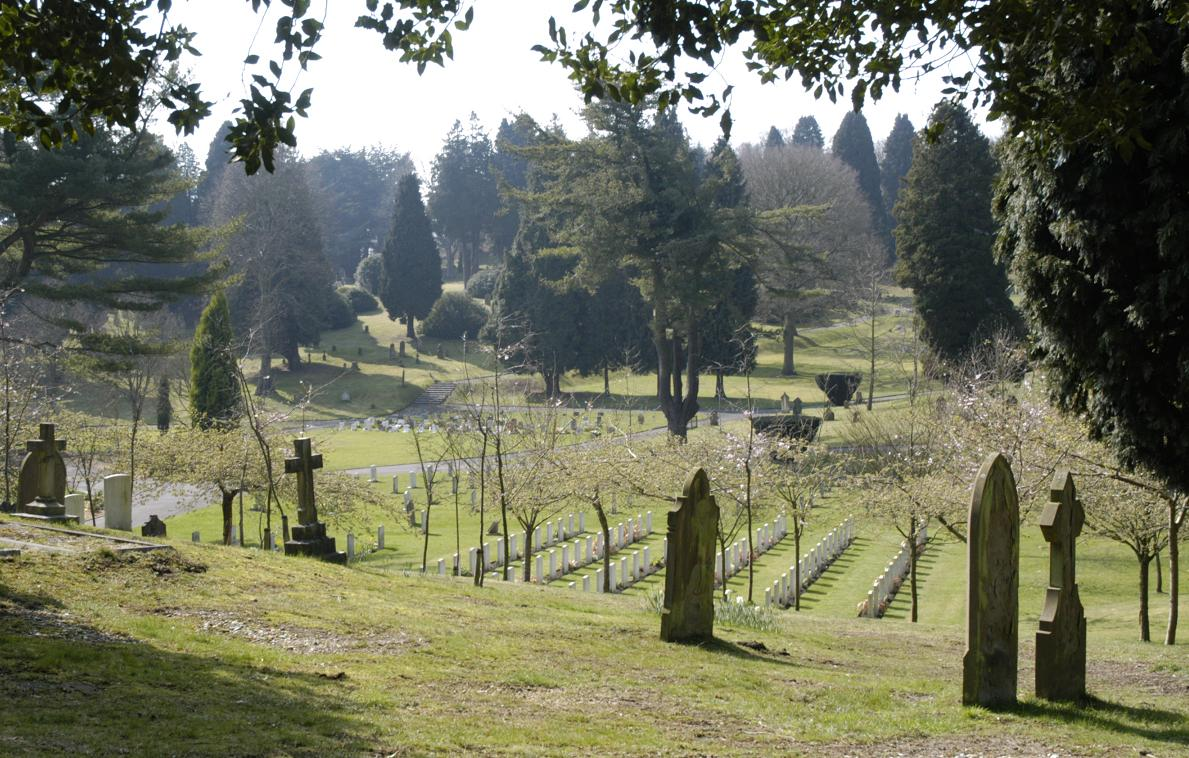
View of Aldershot Military Cemetery

The graves are set in well-tended steep rolling grounds of 15 acres (6.1 ha), traversed by many tarmacadam paths. The area is well wooded with oaks, pines, firs and chestnut trees, interspersed with yew topiary and rhododendrons.

Some parts are of bracken and heather, that are typical of the Aldershot countryside nearby, and possibly this was how this land was in the days before "The Camp" was built and before the cemetery was opened in 1865. The graves themselves are mostly set amid the fine textured close-cut lawns, the cemetery being bordered as a whole, by holly hedging. The most western part of the grounds, where some of the earliest headstones are to be found, has been intentionally allowed to become overgrown. The loftier parts of the ground offer views of the Surrey heathlands, that form some of the nearby Army training grounds.

Some of service personnel interred died in the nearby Cambridge Military Hospital, from wounds or diseases contracted while on active service overseas.

At one time the cemetery held the graves of 78 German soldiers who had died in this country as Prisoners of War, including that of Generalfeldmarschall Ernst Busch, two other German Army officers, 13 members of the Luftwaffe and seven sailors; these were exhumed in February 1963 and re-interred at Cannock Chase German war cemetery in Staffordshire. The cemetery also held the graves of 25 Italian PoWs who were similarly exhumed and reburied in an unknown location.

In addition, 17 victims of the Blackbushe Air Disaster of May 1957 are buried in the cemetery, as well as over 50 Canadian soldiers of both world wars, plus the graves of Poles, South Africans, Gurkhas, Belgians, Dutch, New Zealanders and one Russian, amongst others.

A Cross of Sacrifice stands on the summit of the hill overlooking the First World War burials.

== Lighting the Graves ==
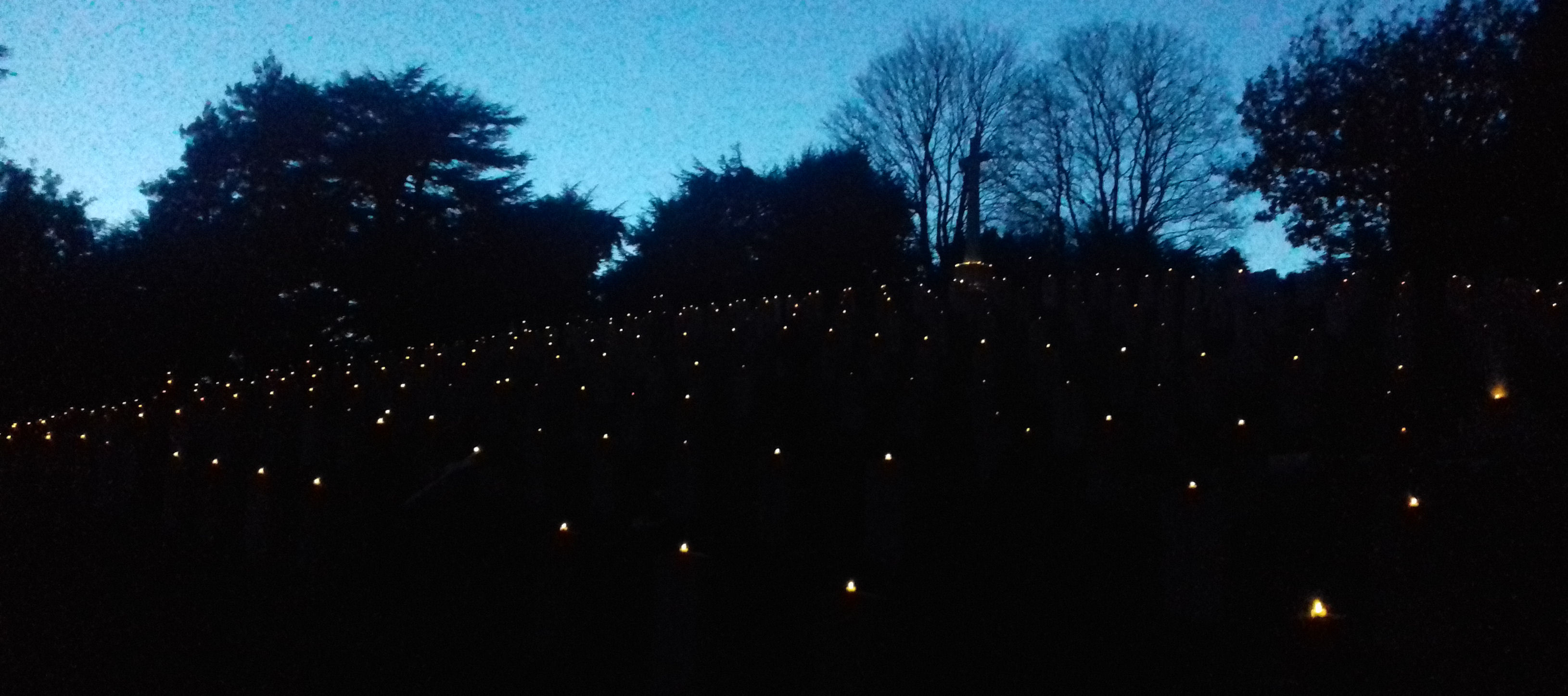
Lighting the Graves on Remembrance Sunday 2018

In 2018 local business man and Aldershot historian Keith Bean organised the first 'Lighting the Graves' service which involved putting a small light on the headstone of each of the 692 servicemen and women who had lost their lives during World War I and were buried in the military cemetery. On the evening of Remembrance Day (November 11) Bean assisted by local people including scout groups lit each of the graves. This was followed by a short service of remembrance at the cemetery's Cross of Sacrifice attended by hundreds of people. The event was repeated on Remembrance Day in 2019 and was attended by even larger crowds who gathered for the commemorative service and then walked around the dark cemetery lit only by the small lights on each grave.

It was intended that the event in 2020 would include the graves of the 129 servicemen and women from World War II in commemoration of the 75th anniversary of the end of that war. The event was cancelled due to COVID restriction. On 14 November 2021 a ceremony of remembrance was again held at the cemetery when the WWI graves were lit followed by a service of remembrance attended by about 1,000 people.

== Notable graves ==
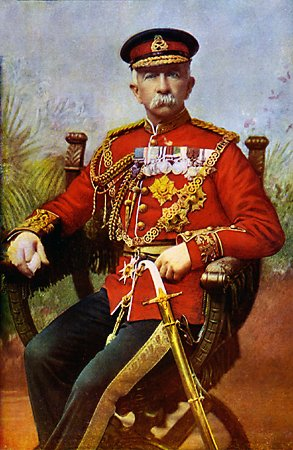
Field Marshal Sir Henry Evelyn Wood in 1900

- Two soldiers from the Battle of Rorke's Drift during the Zulu War of 1879 are buried in the cemetery:
  - Sergeant Edward Wilson, 2nd Battalion South Wales Borderers
  - Corporal D. Sheehan (who enlisted under the name James Graham) of the 90th Regiment (Perthshire Light Infantry).
- The headstone of Major William Davidson Bissett recipient of the Victoria Cross in the latter part of the First World War. He was cremated in Pentrebychan Crematorium, Wrexham.
- Captain Henry Biziou, a British World War I flying ace credited with eight aerial victories.
- Major-General Ronald Bramwell-Davis General Officer Commanding Aldershot District.
- Lieutenant Edward Teshmaker Busk English pioneer of early aircraft design, and the designer of the first full-sized efficient inherently stable aeroplane.
- General Sir Mervyn Butler former Commander-in-Chief of Strategic Command of the British Army.
- Reginald Archibald Cammell, military aviation pioneer and the first pilot to die on active service.
- Samuel Franklin Cody, the early pioneer of manned flight, and often said (incorrectly) to be the only civilian grave in the cemetery.
- Louisa Daniell, philanthropist and founder of the Soldiers' Home and Institute in the town, and her daughter Georgiana Fanny Shipley Daniell who continued the work across England
- Colonel George Armand Furse British army officer and author.
- Major Frank Goodden, the chief test pilot for the Royal Aircraft Factory located at Farnborough, Hants.
- Lieutenant Henry Alan Leeke, a British track and field athlete who competed in the 1908 Olympic Games.
- Lieutenant General Samuel Lomax, wounded at the First Battle of Ypres and died of his wounds in early 1915. He was cremated at Golders Green Crematorium.
- Lieutenant Colonel Richard Lonsdale who served with the Parachute Regiment throughout much of the Second World War.
- Captain Keith Lucas, British scientist, who died in an aircraft collision in World War I.
- Sergeant Ian John McKay VC, who died at Mt Longdon, East Falklands, an important objective in the battle for Stanley in the Falkland Islands.
- Colonel Gordon Neilson, Scottish rugby football player and Army officer in the Boer War and World War I
- General Sir William Scotter Commander-in-Chief, British Army of the Rhine, from September 1978 until October 1980.
- Lieutenant General Sir Paul Travers former Quartermaster-General to the Forces.
- Field Marshal Sir Henry Evelyn Wood Recipient of the Victoria Cross, awarded for his part in putting down the Sinwaho & Sindhora Indian Mutiny of 19 October 1858.

== Gallery ==
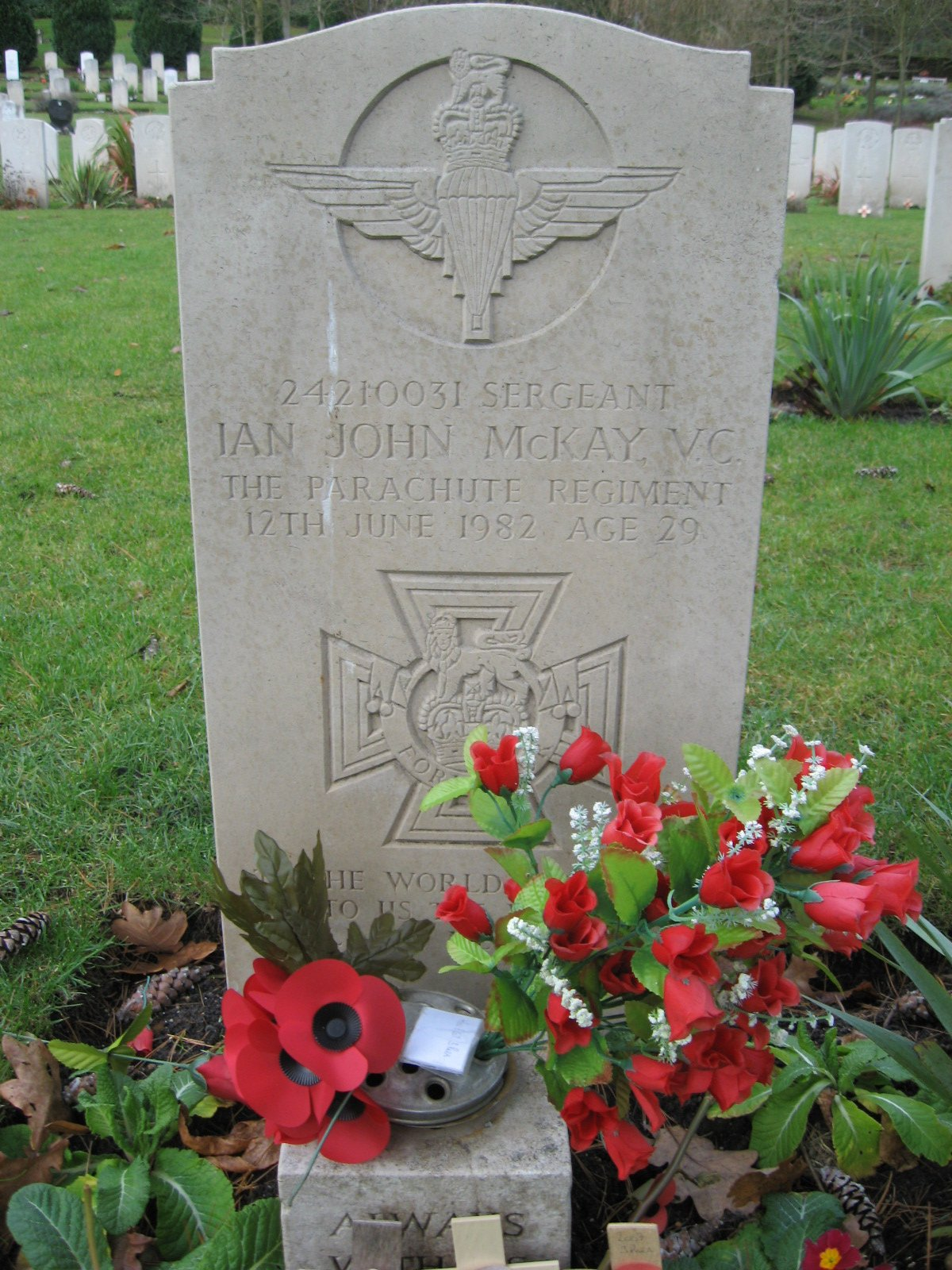
Grave of Sgt. Ian McKay

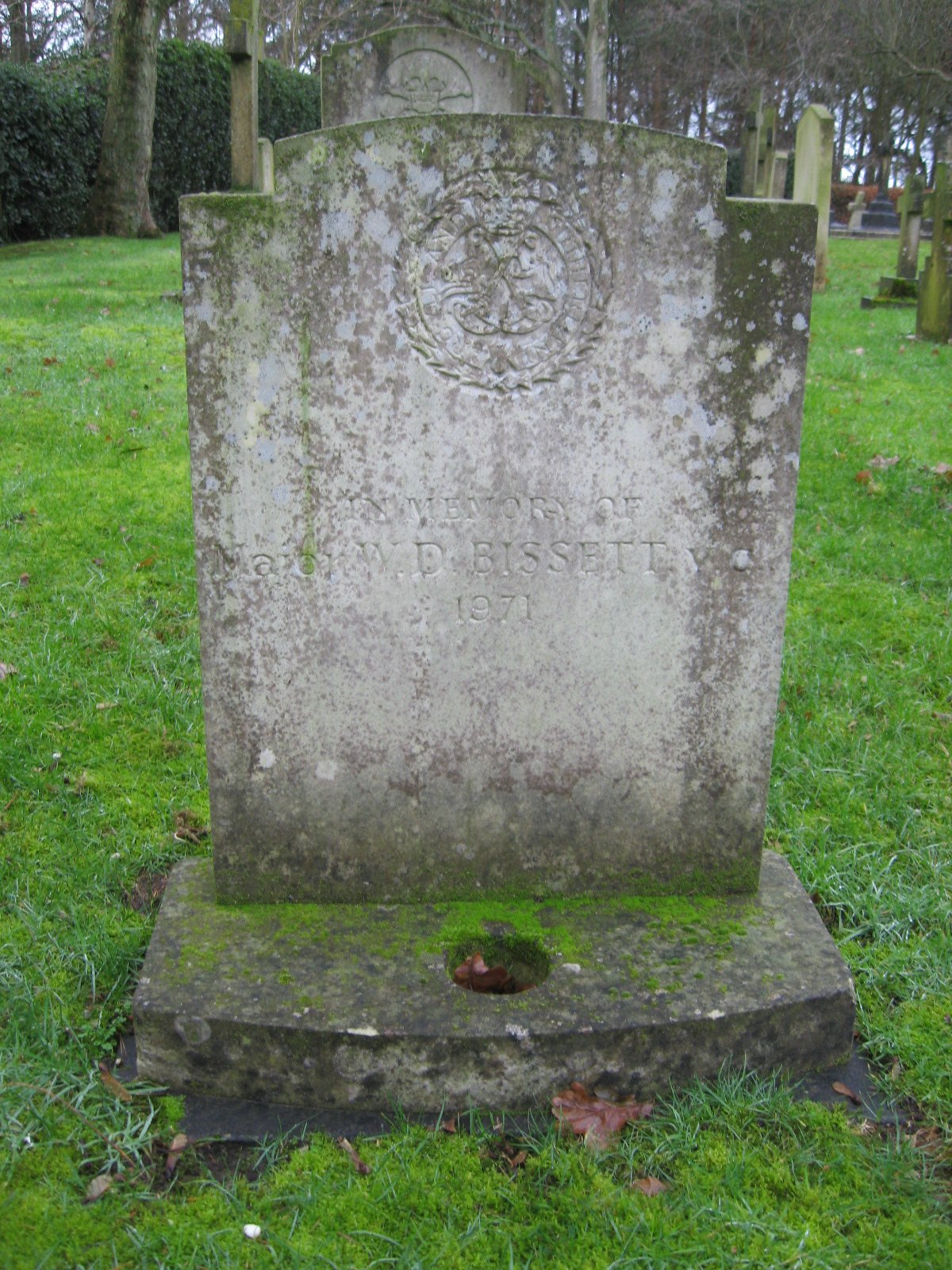
Grave of Major William Davidson Bissett

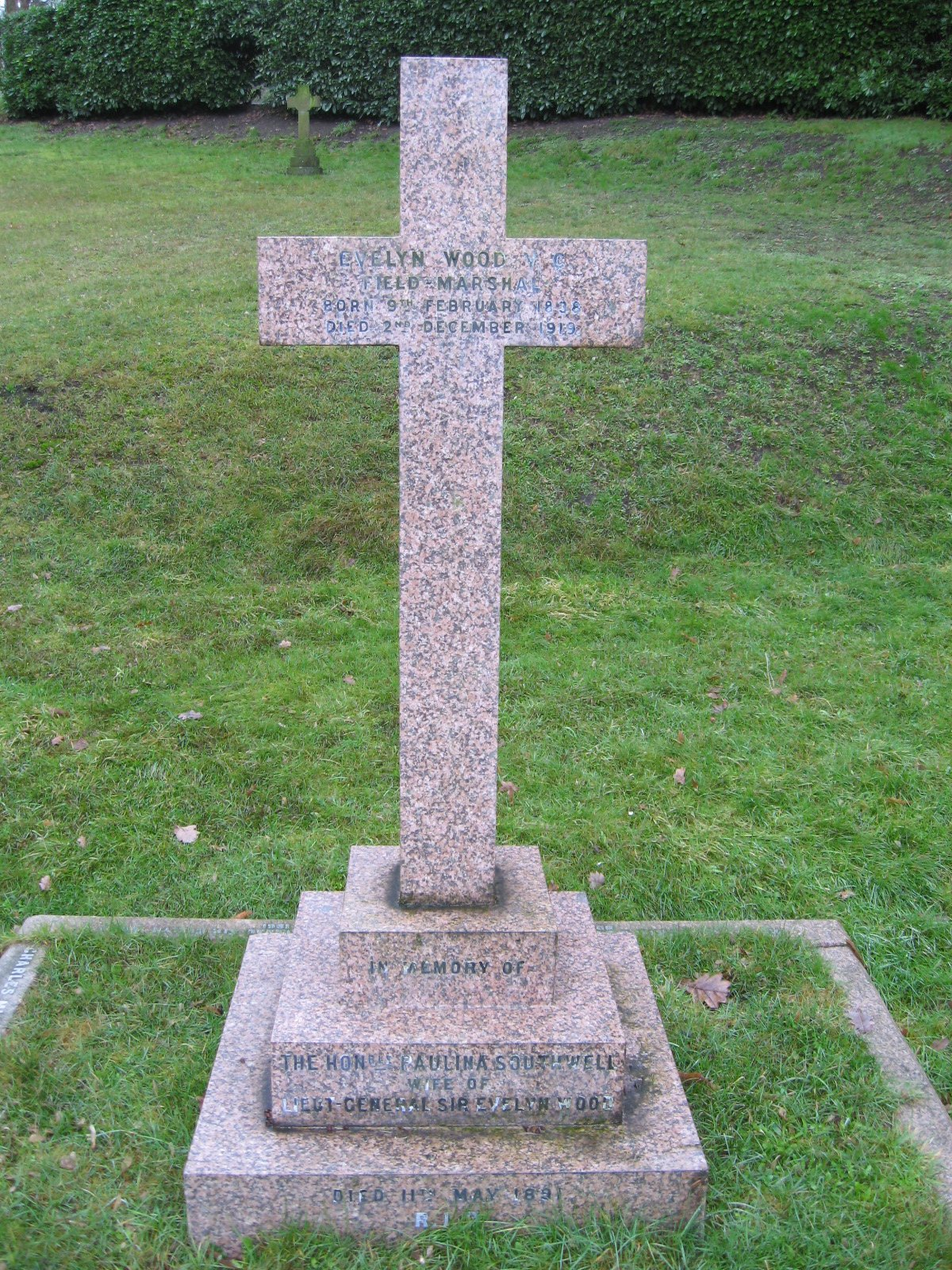
Grave of Field Marshal Sir Evelyn Wood

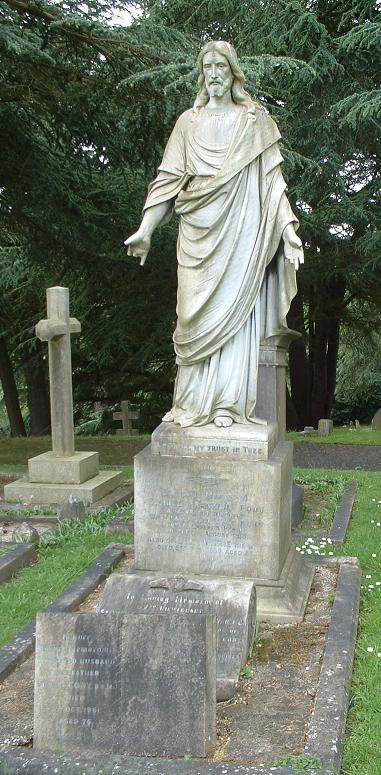
Grave of aviator Samuel Franklin Cody

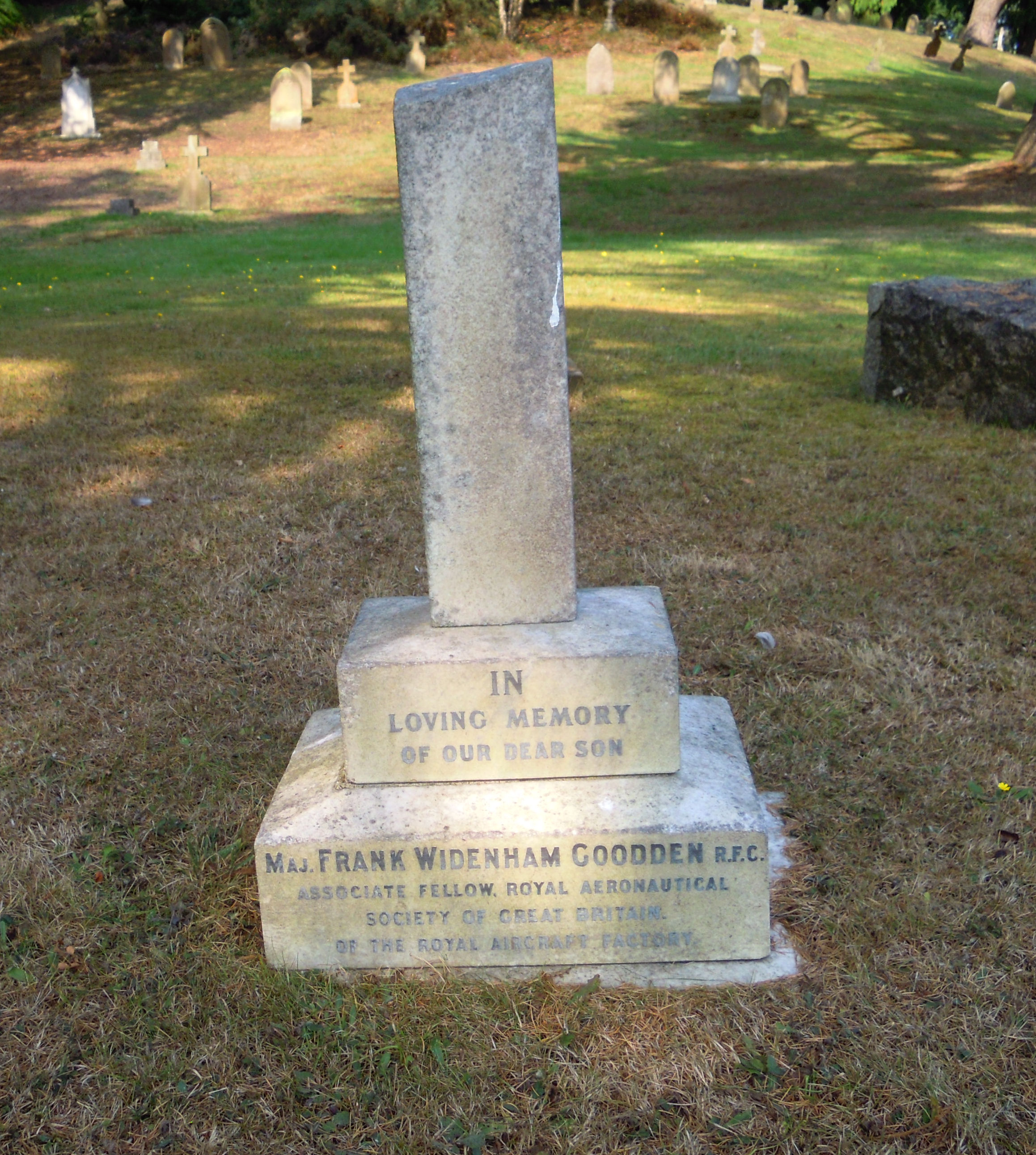
Grave of Frank Goodden

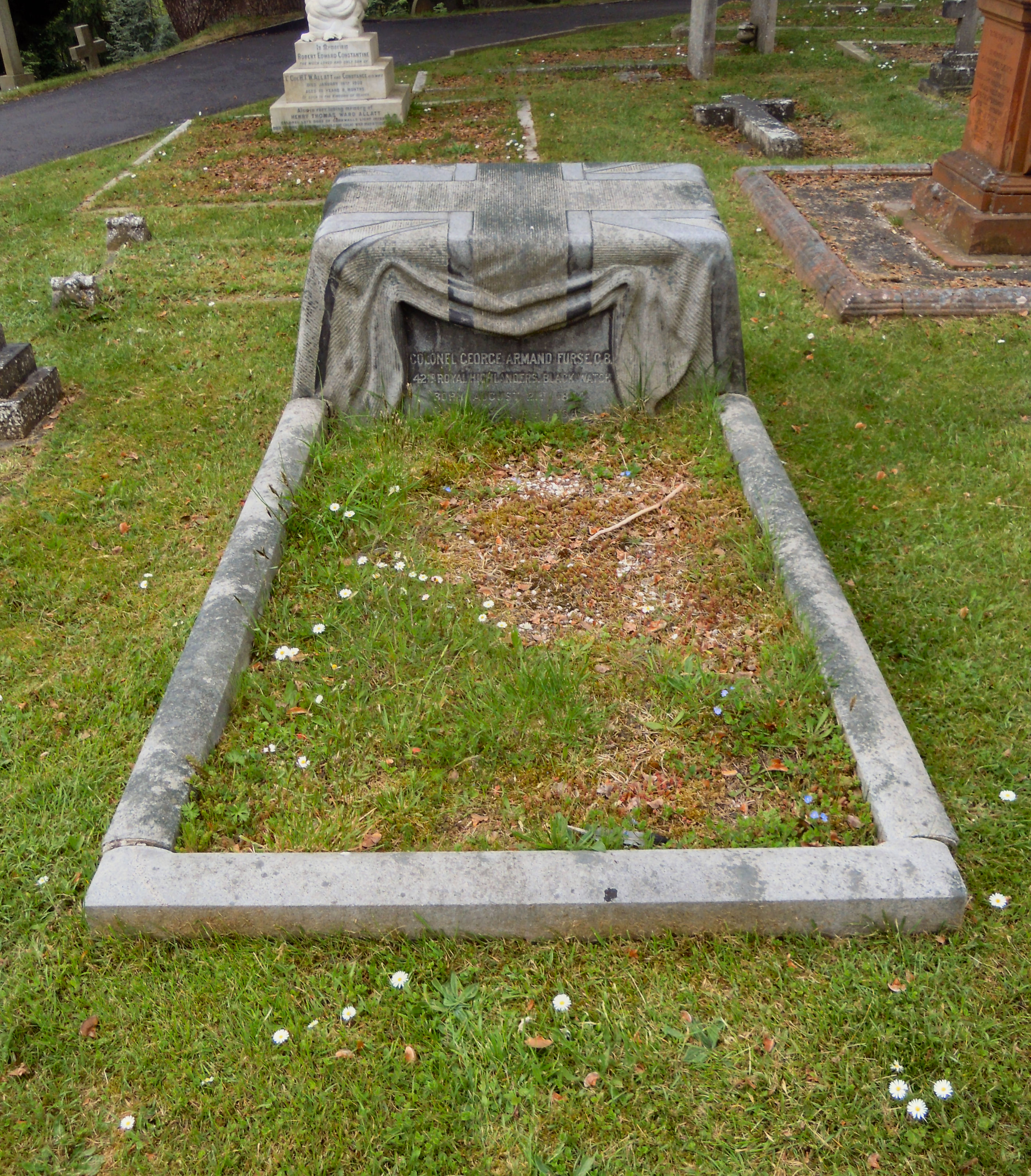
Grave of George Armand Furse

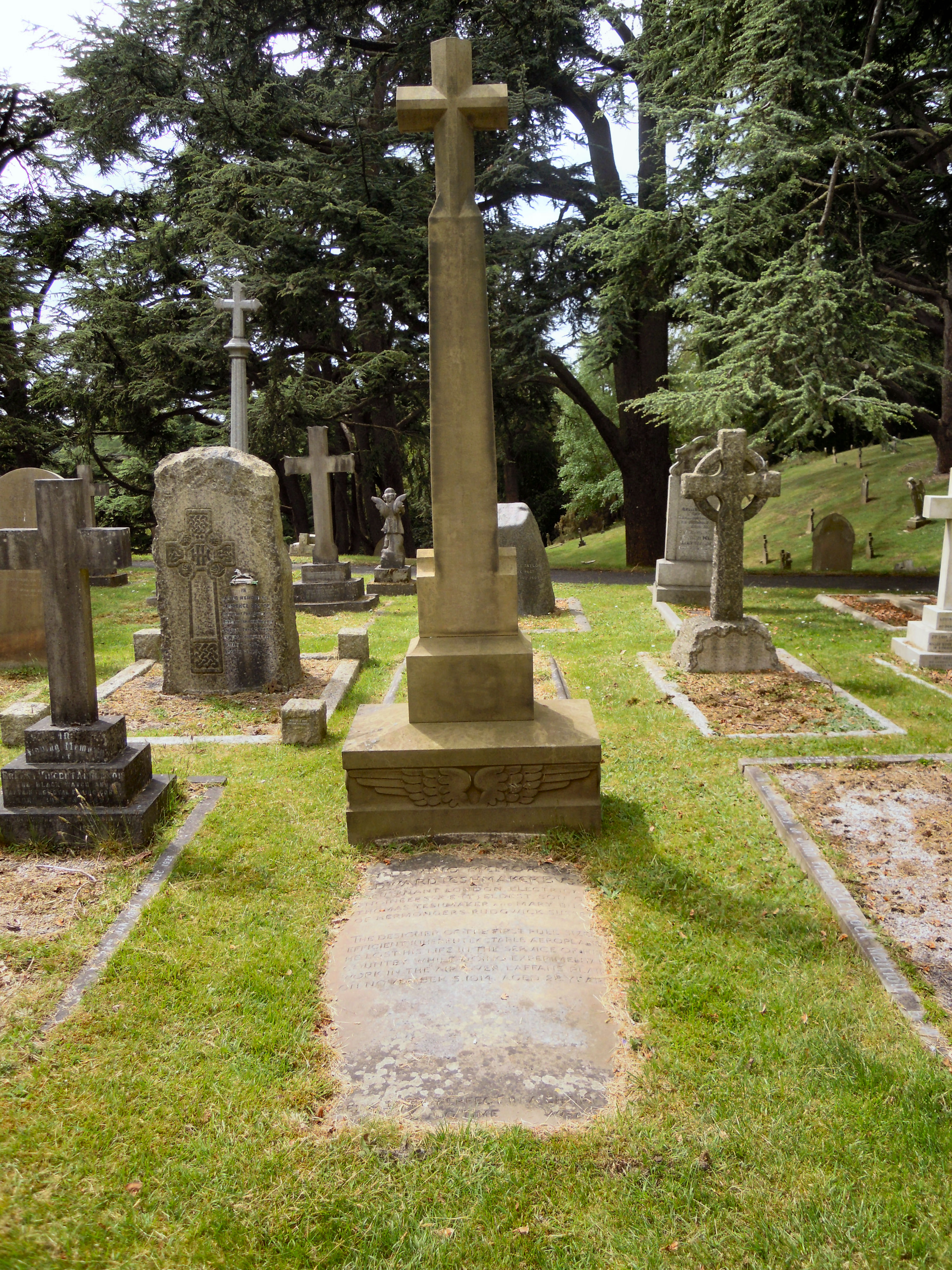
Grave of Edward Teshmaker Busk

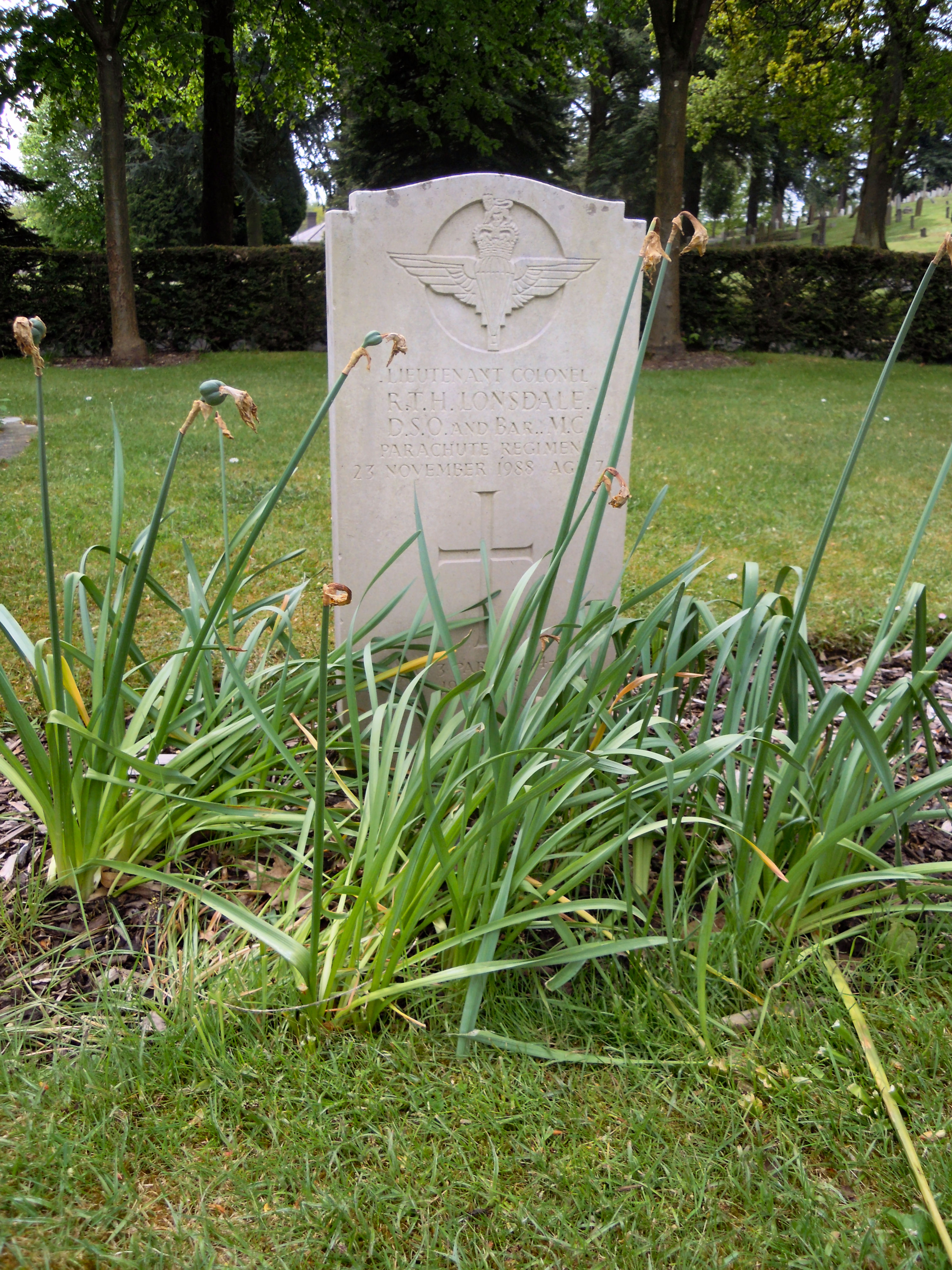
Lieutenant Colonel Richard Lonsdale

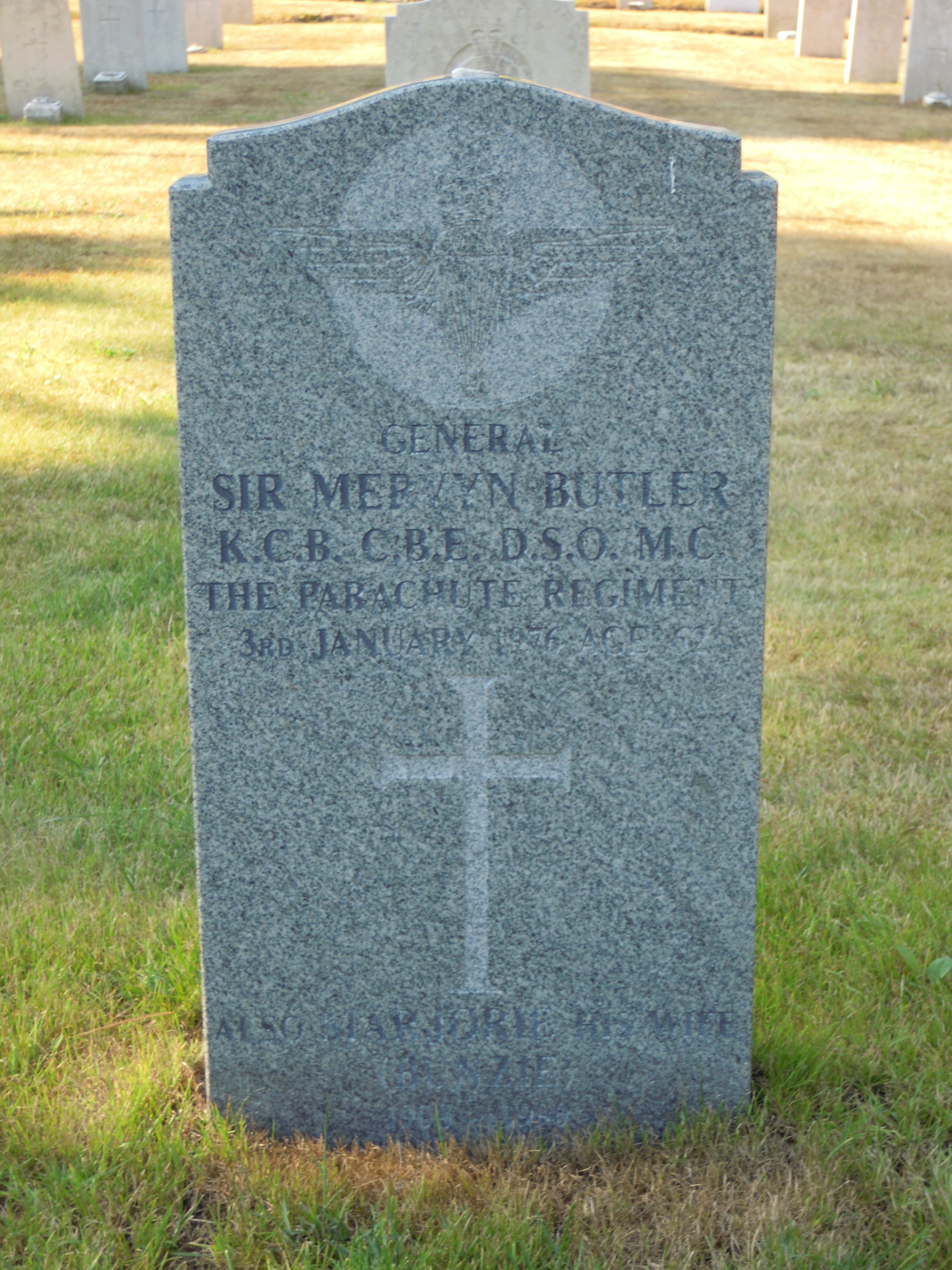
General Sir Mervyn Butler

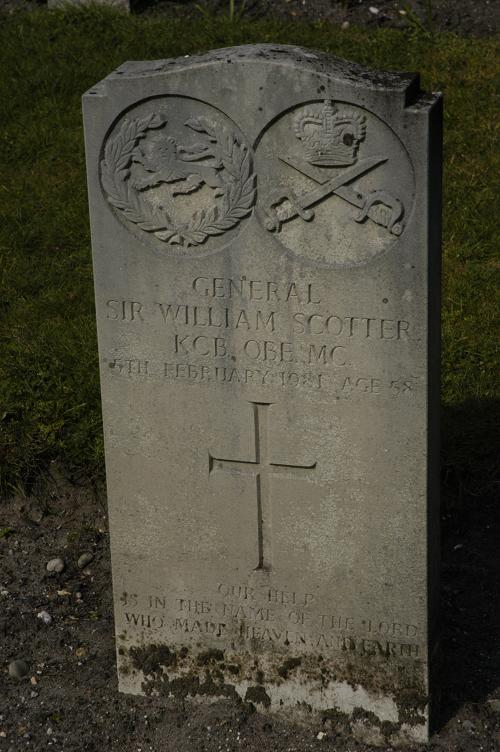
Headstone of Sir William Scotter

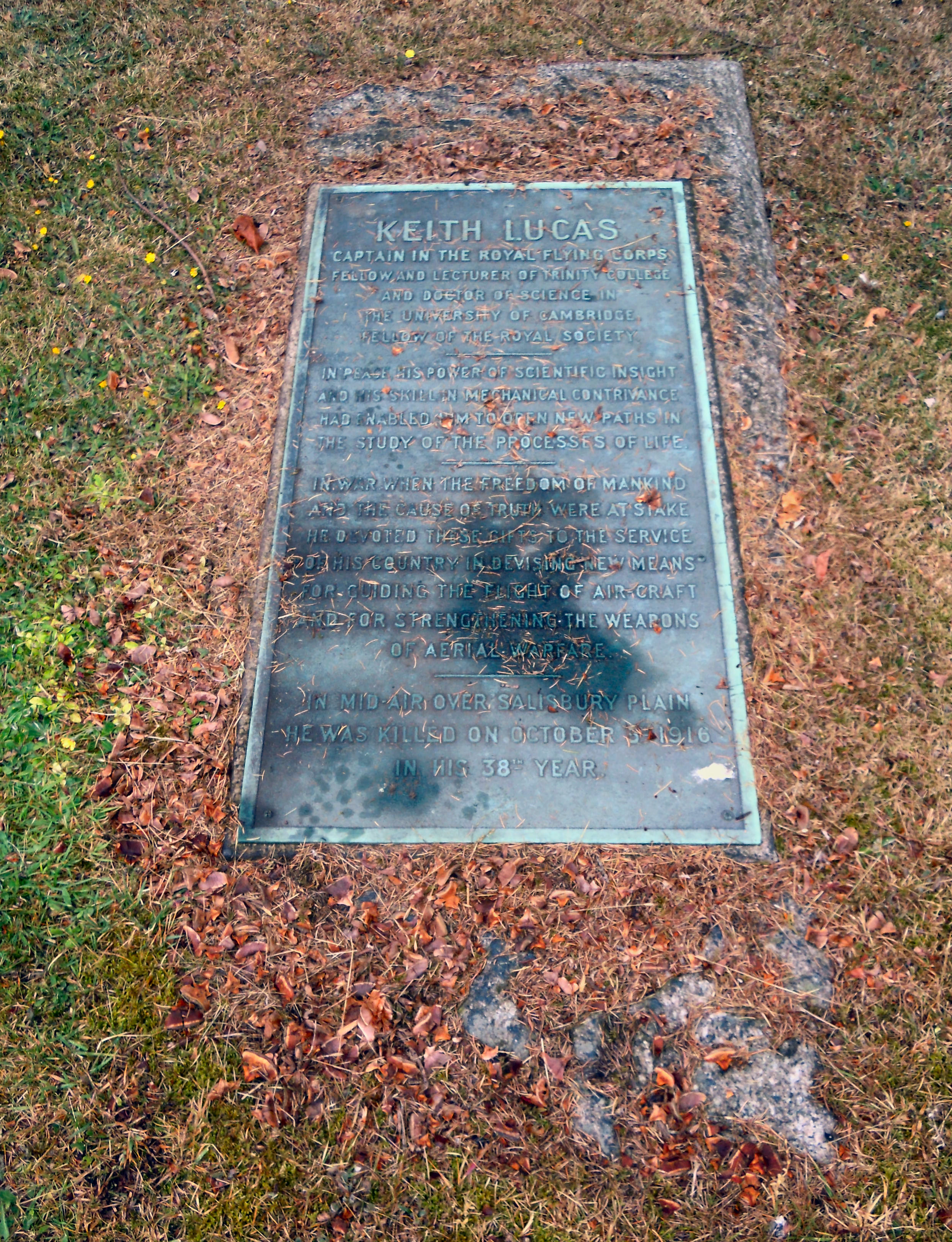
The grave of Keith Lucas

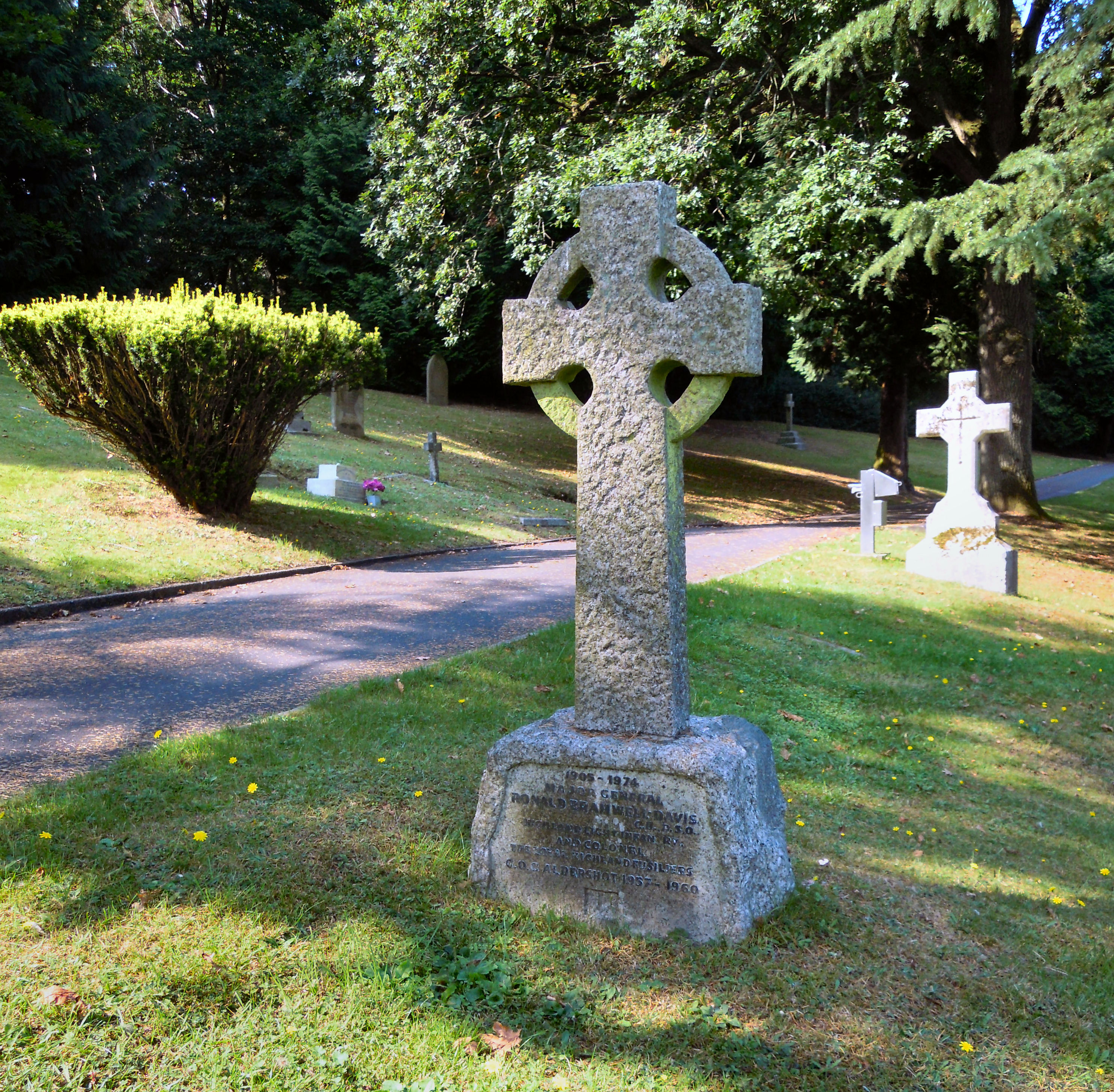
The grave of Ronald Bramwell-Davis

== See also ==
- Aldershot Cemetery, the town's civilian cemetery but which also contains a number of military burials.
- Aldershot Crematorium
