= Frank Goodden =

British test pilot

Frank Widenham Goodden
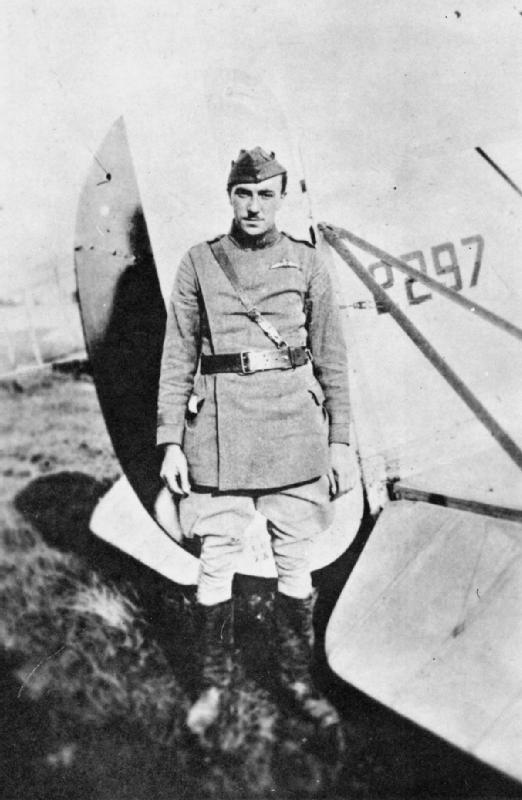
- Goodden in RFC uniform
- Born: 3 October 1889; Pembroke, Pembrokeshire, Wales
- Died: 28 January 1917 (aged 27); Farnborough, Hampshire, England
- Burial place: Aldershot Military Cemetery, Hampshire, England; 51°15′19″N 0°44′49″W
- Military career
- Allegiance: United Kingdom
- Branch: British Army
- Service years: 1915–1917
- Rank: Major
- Conflicts: World War I

Major Frank Widenham Goodden (3 October 1889 – 28 January 1917) was a pioneering British aviator who served as chief test pilot for the Royal Aircraft Factory during the First World War.

== Early life and pre-war flying career ==
Goodden was born in Pembroke, the second son of Harry Francis Goodden, a photographer from Eastbourne, and his wife, Emma Margaret Gould.

He left school aged 16 and worked in engineering for three years before joining the balloon manufacturing company C. G. Spencer and Sons in 1908. The following year he made his first balloon flight, before giving exhibition flights in towns across Britain. Goodden left Spencers in October 1910 to be the engineer for Ernest Willows in his Airship No. 3 "City of Cardiff" on a flight between London and Paris. The airship took off from Wormwood Scrubbs mid-afternoon on 4 November, taking three hours to reach the English coast and another two to cross the Channel. After night fell, cloud and fog meant they became lost over France, eventually setting down at Corbehem near Douai. Louis Breguet drove from his flying ground at La Brayelle nearby, to offer assistance in making repairs. Willows intended to continue the flight to the aerodrome at Issy in Paris the next day, but the weather deteriorated, and instead he packed up the airship and had it transported there by train. They stayed in Paris for several weeks, celebrating the New Year by making several circuits around the Eiffel Tower.

Goodden returned to England in January 1911 and settled in Oxford, making several balloon flights and a number of parachute descents, before turning to heavier-than-air flying machines. Using a 35 h.p. J.A.P. engine recovered from a crashed aircraft he built his own monoplane in 1912, making several flights until lack of money obliged him to take a position as a flying instructor at the Caudron School at Hendon Aerodrome. He was granted Royal Aero Club Aviators' Certificate No. 506 on 3 June 1913 after soloing a Caudron bi-plane at the W. H. Ewen School at Hendon, where he then became an instructor, and was a regular participant in the popular air shows, demonstrations and races of the time.

On 30 April 1914 at the first night-flying demonstration at Hendon, he became the first pilot to loop the loop in the dark. Flying a 60 h.p. Anzani-powered Caudron fitted with additional lights, Goodden took off just after 9 p.m., climbing to about 2,000 feet (610 m) and executing three loops, before descending in banked spirals, to land after 25 minutes to receive an ovation and many congratulations. He was also the pilot when William Newell became the first British man to make a parachute jump from a powered aircraft at Hendon on 9 May 1914.

Goodden was entered into the Daily Mail Aerial Derby in a Morane-Saulnier H aircraft, scheduled to take place on Saturday 23 May 1914. However after several weeks of fine weather, a storm broke over London on the Friday night, and the following day was very unsettled and misty, and altogether unfavourable for a cross-country race. It may have also been responsible for the loss of Gustav Hamel, who took off from Paris early that morning in a new 100 h.p. Morane-Saulnier aircraft to take part, but was lost over the English Channel. After several test flights the contest was postponed until 6 June, but a speed race of four laps of the aerodrome was organized in which Goodden came fifth. The fashionable crowd of spectators included Lady Diana Manners, Lord and Lady Curzon, Lord Herbert Vane Tempest, Prince Lichnowsky, the Bishop of Glasgow, Guglielmo Marconi, and Captain Thomas S. Baldwin. On the Sunday around thirty exhibition flights were made, about half of which also took passengers, including Enrico Caruso, who flew with Claude Grahame-White.

The following weekend, on 30 May 1914, Goodden took part in Eighth London Aviation Meeting at Hendon, giving a flying display in his Morane-Saulnier, looping the loop three times at an altitude of about 1,000 feet (300 m). He then competed in the first heat of Daily Telegraph Cup, but his aircraft crashed on take-off hitting some enclosure railings and overturning, leaving him strapped upside down in the cockpit, fortunately unhurt.

== World War I ==
Goodden joined the staff of the Royal Aircraft Factory at Farnborough as a civilian test pilot on 7 August 1914, immediately after the declaration of war. He made the first flights of several aircraft, including the F.E.6 (14 November 1914), F.E.2a (26 January 1915), S.E.4 (25 June 1915), B.E.9 (14 August 1915), and F.E.8 (15 October 1915). Over time responsibility for test flying was taken over by the Aeronautical Inspection Department, and Goodden's duties became more experimental, and in January 1916 he was appointed head of the Experimental Flying Department.

While remaining attached to the Royal Aircraft Factory Goodden was commissioned as a second lieutenant (on probation) in the Royal Flying Corps on 13 February 1915, and appointed a flying officer the same day. He was confirmed in his rank on 5 March. On 15 February 1916 Goodden, now a lieutenant, was appointed a flight commander with the acting rank of captain, and on 23 October 1916 he was appointed a squadron commander with the acting rank of major.

On 12 July 1915 Goodden was injured in a serious accident in a B.E.2c at RFC Shoreham, in which his passenger, Henry D. Liley, a Royal Aircraft Factory civilian tester, was killed and the aircraft written off. This accident was witnessed by Duncan Grinnell-Milne, then a trainee who had not yet flown. Grinnell-Milne attributes the accident to Goodden attempting to turn the aircraft to return to the airfield, but Goodden's written statement to the inquest stated that 'a gust of wind lifted his right plane and, finding it impossible to right this tendency, he decided on a left turn, which entailed flying down into the wind', leading to the crash.

In the late summer of 1916, reports had filtered back to the Factory that the F.E.8 was involved in a series of spinning accidents and that the type was acquiring a reputation as a dangerous aircraft. To disprove this, Goodden deliberately spun an F.E.8 three times in both directions from an altitude of no more than 3,500 feet (1,100 m) and recovered by applying what has since become the customary control inputs.

== Death ==
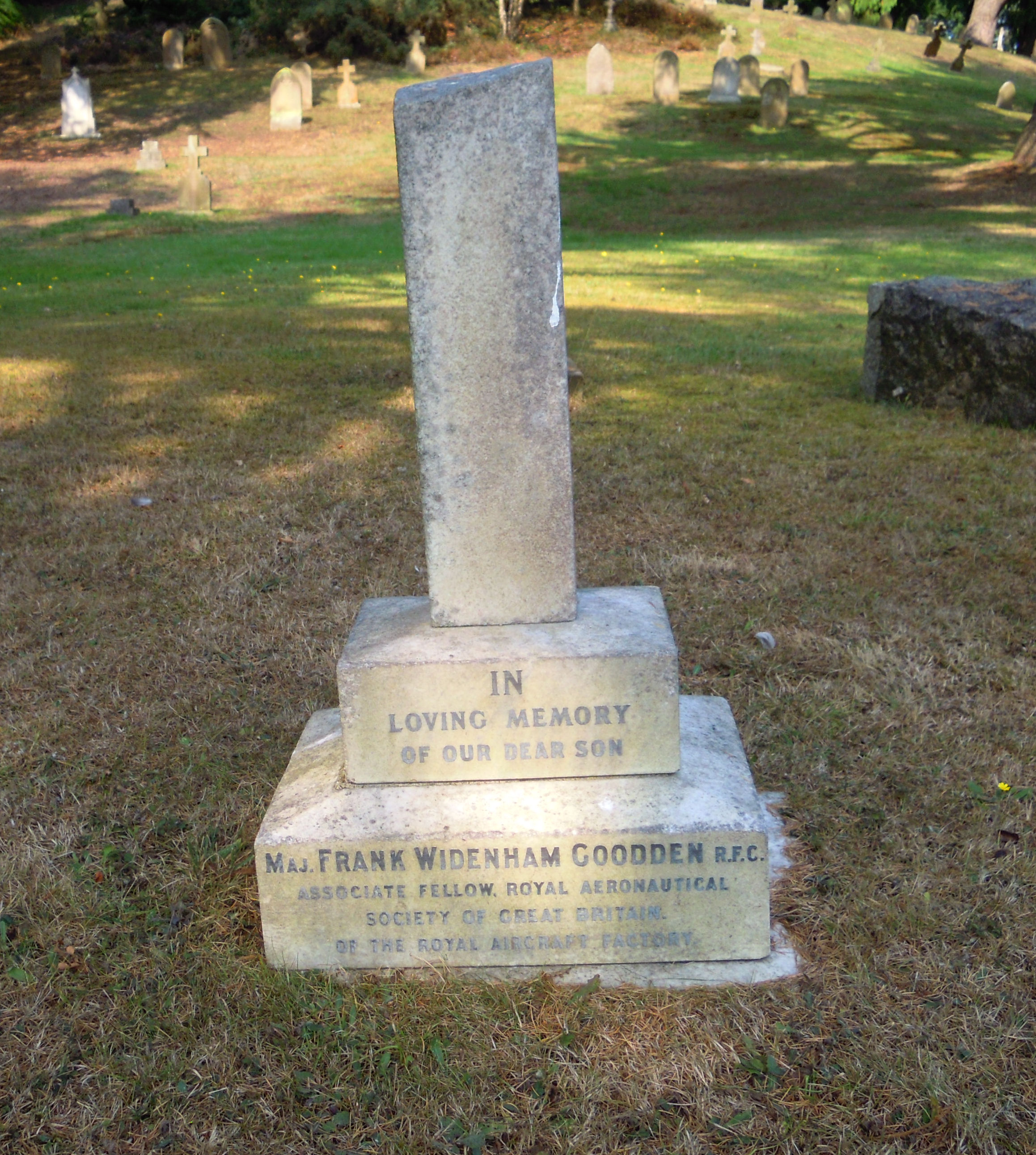
Goodden's grave in Aldershot Military Cemetery

On 28 January 1917, Goodden was killed in a crash at Farnborough while flying one of the first prototypes of the S.E.5, which he had designed with Henry Folland and John Kenworthy. At the inquest on 30 January a witness described how Goodden's aircraft was seen to be making a slow turn when the wings on the left side appeared to collapse, the aircraft side-slipped, and then nose-dived vertically to the ground with the wings folded up. The coroner returned a verdict of Accidental Death. An inspection discovered that the wings had suffered failure in downward torsion. Plywood webs were then added to the compression ribs, curing the problem, and were standardized on all later S.E.5s and S.E.5as.

Goodden's funeral took place on 1 February 1917, and the service was attended by many military officers, men from the Royal Aircraft Factory, representatives from numerous aerodromes, public bodies and the leading aircraft companies. The funeral procession was more than half a mile long. Goodden was buried with full military honours with a firing party from the RFC. He is buried in Grave AG. 362 at the Aldershot Military Cemetery.

== See also ==
- List of accidents and incidents involving military aircraft before 1925
- List of pilots awarded an Aviator's Certificate by the Royal Aero Club in 1913

== Bibliography ==
- Bruce, J. M. (1970). War Planes of the First World War, Fighters, Volume Two (revised ed.). Garden City, New York: Doubleday & Company Inc.
- Mason, Francis K. (1992) [1967]. The British Fighter since 1912. Annapolis, Maryland: Naval Institute Press. ISBN 9781557500823.
