= Edward Teshmaker Busk =

British aircraft design pioneer

Edward Teshmaker Busk

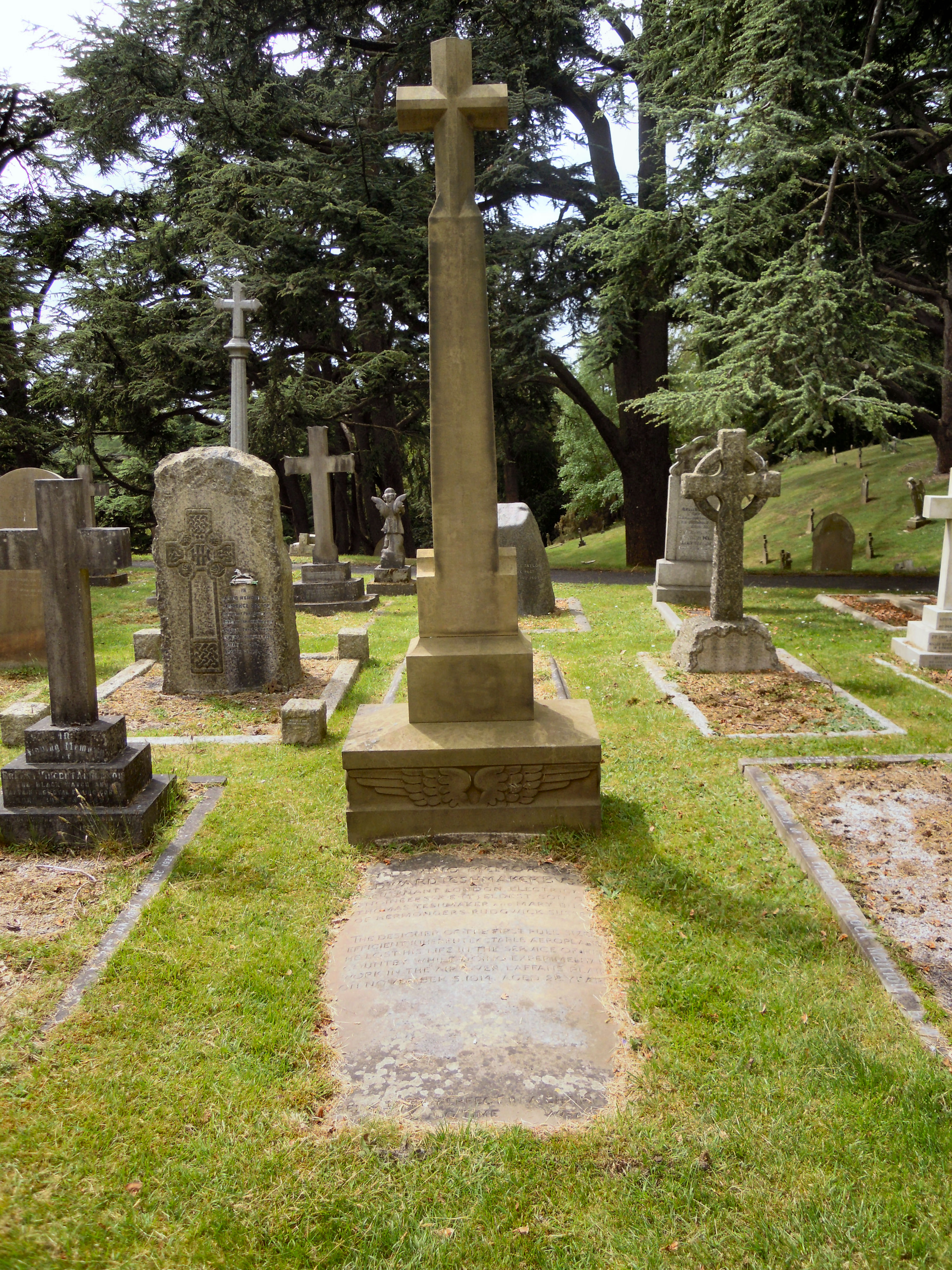
The grave of Edward Teshmaker Busk in Aldershot Military Cemetery

Lieutenant Edward Teshmaker Busk, London Electrical Engineers. RE(T) (8 March 1886 – 5 November 1914) was an English pioneer of early aircraft design, and the designer of the first full-sized efficient inherently stable aeroplane.

He was the son of Thomas Teshmaker Busk (1852–1894; a descendant of Wadsworth Busk) and Mary Busk née Acworth (1854–1935), of Hermongers, Rudgwick, Sussex. After attaining First Class Honours in Mechanical Sciences at Cambridge in June 1912 he became Assistant Engineer at the newly formed Royal Aircraft Factory, Farnborough, later the Royal Aircraft Establishment. Here he devoted much of his time to the mathematics and dynamics of stable flight.

In the early years of powered flight inherent stability in an aircraft was a most important quality. Busk took his theories into the air and tried them out in practice. In 1913 this work was used in the R.E.1 (Reconnaissance Experimental), claimed as the first inherently stable aeroplane, and resulted in the development of the B.E.2c.

The remarkable feature of this design was that there was no single device that was the cause of the stability. The stability resulted from detailed design of each part of the aircraft, with due regard to its relation to, and effect on, other parts in the air. Weights and areas were so arranged that under most conditions the machine would tend to right itself.

Busk was killed on 5 November 1914 while making an experimental flight in a B.E.2 which caught fire at Laffans Plain (now Farnborough Airfield), near Aldershot, burning him to death. He was buried at Aldershot Military Cemetery with full military honours.

Frederick Lanchester wrote in 1916:

Mr. Busk combined with exceptional ability as an experimenter a very thorough knowledge of his work; he was largely responsible for the design and construction of many instruments and appliances which have proved of the greatest service in the development of the present-day [flying] machine.

Busk's genius and his courage were recognised by the posthumous award of the Gold Medal of the Aeronautical Society of Great Britain, and amongst the many letters of condolence received by his mother was one from King George V.

His youngest brother, Hans Acworth Busk (b. 1894), was reported missing on 6 January 1916, last seen flying a heavy bombing aeroplane against the Turks at Gallipoli. They were both survived by their mother Mary Busk (née Acworth, 1854–1935), author of a biography of her two sons lost while flying, by sister Mary Agnes Dorothea Morse (1888–1960) and by brother Henry Gould Busk (1890–1956).

The family set up the Busk Studentship in Aeronautics, which was awarded annually. In 1928 it was awarded to a student at Imperial College called Stanley Hooker (later Sir Stanley) and included a cheque for £50 that was received each term.

== Memorials ==
- Busk Crescent, Farnborough.
- The Busk Memorial, R.A.E. Farnborough, a small lily pond and fountain with memorial plaque.
- Holy Trinity Church, Rudgwick.
- The Busk Studentship in Aeronautics at Cambridge University
