= List of aircraft of the Royal Naval Air Service =

This is a list of military aircraft used by the Royal Naval Air Service (RNAS).

== Aircraft in squadron use ==
- AD Flying Boat - 29 built
- Airco DH.4
- Airco DH.6
- Airco DH.9
- Armstrong Whitworth FK.3
- Avro 503
- Avro 504
- Beardmore WB.III
- Blériot XI
- Bréguet Type III
- Bréguet 4
- Bréguet 5
- Bristol Boxkite
- Bristol TB.8
- Bristol Scout
- Caudron G.3 140 used as trainers
- Caudron G.4 46 used as bombers
- Curtiss H.4 Small America
- Curtiss H.12 Large America
- Curtiss H.16 Large America
- Curtiss Model R
- Curtiss JN-3
- Curtiss JN-4
- Curtiss Jenny
- Deperdussin TT
- Franco-British Aviation Type A, B and C
- Fairey IIIA (1917)
- Fairey Campania
- Fairey Hamble Baby
- Farman F.40
- Farman HF.20
- Farman MF.7 Longhorn
- Farman MF.11 Shorthorn
- Felixstowe F.2
- Felixstowe Porte Baby
- Felixstowe F.3
- Felixstowe F.5
- Flanders B.2
- Grahame-White Type XV
- Handley Page 0/100 and 0/400
- Mann Egerton Type B
- Morane-Borel monoplane
- Morane-Saulnier BB
- Morane-Saulnier Type L
- Nieuport VI
- Nieuport 10
- Nieuport 11
- Nieuport 12
- Nieuport 17
- Nieuport 17bis
- Nieuport 21
- Nieuport 24
- Nieuport Monoplane Seaplane - 12 aircraft
- Norman Thompson N.T.2B
- Norman Thompson N.T.4
- Parnall Hamble Baby Convert
- Pemberton-Billing PB.25
- REP Parasol
- Royal Aircraft Factory BE.2 - 4 BE.2As & 95 BE.2E
- Short Admiralty Type 74
- Short Admiralty Type 81
- Short Bomber
- Short Folder
- Short Type 166
- Short Type 184
- Short 310-A
- Short Type 320
- Short Type 827
- Short Type 830
- Sopwith Type 807
- Sopwith Type 860
- Sopwith B.1
- Sopwith Baby
- Sopwith 1½ Strutter
- Sopwith Camel
- Sopwith Cuckoo
- Sopwith Gunbus
- Sopwith Pup
- Sopwith Tabloid
- Sopwith Three-seater
- Sopwith Triplane
- Sopwith Two-Seat Scout
- Thomas Brothers T-2
- Vickers Type 32 Gunbus
- Voisin III
- White and Thompson No. 3
- White and Thompson Bognor Bloater
- Wight Converted Seaplane
- Wight Pusher Seaplane
- Wight Seaplane

== Prototypes and other minor aircraft ==
- ASL Valkyrie
- AD Boat
- AD Scout
- AD Navyplane
- AD Seaplane Type 1000
- AD Sparrow
- Airco DH.5 - 1 aircraft
- Albatros B.II - 1 aircraft was imported into the United Kingdom before August 1914.
- Alcock Scout - 1 built and used operationally
- Armstrong Whitworth F.K.6
- Armstrong Whitworth F.K.8 - 1 aircraft
- Armstrong Whitworth F.K.10 - 4 used
- Avro Type D
- Avro 500 - 6 used.
- Avro 501 - 1 used.
- Avro 510
- Avro 519
- Avro 523 Pike
- Avro 528
- Avro 529
- Beardmore W.B.1
- Beardmore W.B.1a
- Beardmore W.B.III
- Beardmore W.B.IV
- Beardmore W.B.V
- Blackburn Blackburd
- Blackburn G.P.
- Blackburn Triplane
- Blackburn Twin Blackburn
- Blackburn Type L
- Blériot Parasol -12 used.
- Borel hydro-monoplane - 8 or more used. see Etablissements Borel
- Breguet Chenu-engined biplane - 1 aircraft
- Breguet Tin Whistle Seaplane - 1 aircraft
- British Deperdussin Seagull
- Burgess Gunbus
- Caproni Ca.4
- Caudron Type H amphibian seaplanes - 2 aircraft
- Curtiss C-1 Canada
- Curtiss N - 6 aircraft
- Curtiss T Wanamaker Triplane
- DFW B.II - One aircraft imported into the United Kingdom before August 1914.
- DFW Mars - One aircraft imported into the United Kingdom before August 1914.
- Donnet L'Eveque Flying Boat
- Dyott Bomber
- Dyyott Tractor Monoplane
- Etrich Taube - Imported into the United Kingdom in 1912.
- FBA Type H
- Fairey F.2
- Fairey N.9
- Flanders B.2
- Felixstowe F.1
- Felixstowe Fury
- Handley Page HP.14
- Handley Page Type G
- Handley Page R/200 - 6 aircraft
- Mann Egerton Type H
- Morane-Saulnier G - 1 aircraft
- Nieuport IV
- Nieuport Tractor Biplane Scout
- Nieuport Triplane - 2 aircraft
- Norman Thompson N.1B
- Norman Thompson N.T.2C
- Parnall Scout
- Pemberton-Billing P.B.9
- Pemberton-Billing P.B.23 1 aircraft
- Pemberton-Billing P.B.25E - 1 aircraft
- Perry Beadle and Co T1 and T2 Tractor Biplane
- Phoenix P.5 Cork
- Porte Baby
- Port Victoria P.V.1
- Port Victoria P.V.2
- Port Victoria P.V.4
- Port Victoria P.V.5
- Port Victoria P.V.7
- Port Victoria P.V.8
- Port Victoria P.V.9
- Port Victoria Grain Griffin
- Robey-Peters Gun-Carrier - 1 aircraft
- Royal Aircraft Factory BE.8
- Royal Aircraft Factory C.E.1 - 2 aircraft
- Royal Aircraft Factory H.R.E.2
- Royal Aircraft Factory RE.5
- Sage Type 2
- Sage Type 3
- Sage Type 4
- Short S.27
- Short Tandem Twin (modified S.27)
- Short S.36 Tractor Biplane
- Short S.34 T1
- Short S.38 Trainer
- Short S.39 Triple Twin
- Short S.41 Tractor Biplane
- Short S.45 T5
- Short S.46
- Short S.47 Triple Tractor T4
- Short S.53 Admiralty No. 42
- Short 54 - 1 aircraft
- Short S.60
- Short S.63 Folder Seaplane
- Short S.69
- Short 79
- Short 80 - 1 aircraft
- Short S.81 Gunbus Seaplane
- Short S.82
- Short S.87 Type 135 Seaplane
- Short S.135
- Short S.301 (140 hp Salmson) Seaplane
- Short Type 310-B
- Short N.2A Scout
- Short N.2B - 2 aircraft
- Short Shirl - 4 aircraft
- Short-Wright Biplane - 1 aircraft
- Sloane-Day H.1 - 1 aircraft
- Sopwith Admiralty Type 137 - 2 aircraft
- Sopwith Bat Boat
- Sopwith Bee - 1 aircraft
- Sopwith D.1
- Sopwith H.T. Seaplane (Hydro Tractor) biplane, also known as the Cromarty
- Sopwith Hispano-Suiza Triplane - 2 aircraft
- Sopwith Sociable - 1 aircraft
- Sopwith Special torpedo seaplane Type C - 1 aircraft
- Spencer-Stirling biplane - 1 aircraft
- SPAD VII
- Sunbeam Bomber - 1 aircraft
- Supermarine Baby - 2 aircraft
- Supermarine Nighthawk - 1 aircraft
- Tellier T.3 Flying-Boat
- Westland N.1B - 2 aircraft
- Wight Baby - 3 aircraft
- Wight Bomber - 1 aircraft
- Wight Quadruplane - 1 aircraft
- Wright Triplane Flying Boat -
- Wight Twin - 4 aircraft

== Airships ==
- His Majesty's Airship No. 1 "Mayfly"
- Astra-Torres airship
- Perseval PL-18, No.5 Airship - Built by in the United Kingdom in 1913. Built under licence by Vickers.
- Perseval PL-19, No.6 Airship
- His Majesty's Naval Airship No. 2 (Willows No. 4)
- No. 9r
- 23 class airship
- R23X class airship
- R.29
- R31 class airship
- R33 class airship
- SS class airship
- SSP class airship
- SST class airship
- SSZ class airship
- Coastal class airship
- C Star class airship
- NS class airship

== Kites ==
- Man-lifting kite

== Unmanned aerial vehicles ==
- British unmanned aerial vehicles of World War I

== List of weapons of the Royal Naval Air Service ==
=== Armoured Cars ===
- Delaunay-Belleville armoured car
- Lanchester armoured car
- Pierce-Arrow armoured lorry
- Rolls-Royce Armoured Car
- Seabrook armoured lorry
- Talbot armoured car

=== Free-fall bombs ===
- 20-lb (9-kg) Cooper bombs
- Ranken dart: Anti-Zeppelin weapon.

=== Rockets ===
- Le Prieur rocket: Unguided air-to-air rocket.

=== Aircraft guns ===
- 0.303-inch (7.7-mm) Lewis gun
- 0.303-inch (7.7-mm) Vickers machine gun
- Canon d'Infanterie de 37 modél 1916
- Davis gun

=== Torpedoes ===
- British 18-inch torpedo

== See also ==
- List of aircraft of the Fleet Air Arm
- List of aircraft of the Royal Air Force
- List of aircraft of the Royal Flying Corps
- List of British airships
