= HMS Ark Royal (1914) =

1914 British seaplane carrier

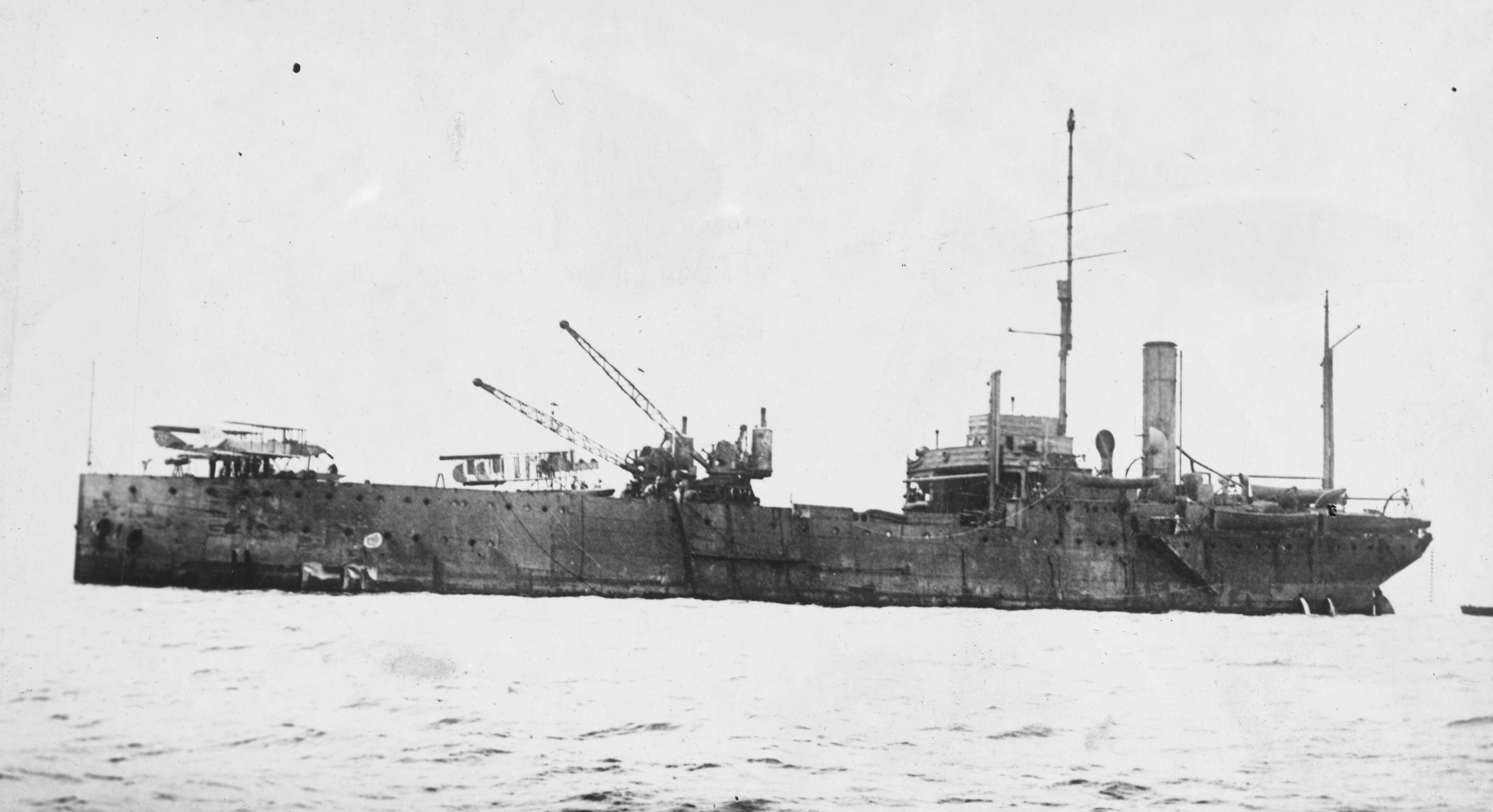
- Ark Royal around 1918

History

United Kingdom
- Name: Ark Royal
- Builder: Blyth Shipbuilding Company, Blyth, Northumberland
- Laid down: 7 November 1913
- Launched: 5 September 1914
- Acquired: May 1914
- Commissioned: 10 December 1914
- Out of service: February 1944
- Renamed: Pegasus, 21 December 1934
- Fate: Sold, 18 October 1946

Panama
- Name: Anita I
- Owner: R. C. Ellerman
- Operator: Compania de Navigation Ellanita
- Acquired: 18 October 1946
- Fate: Seized for debts, 16 June 1949
- Notes: Sold for scrap, October 1950

General characteristics
- Type: Seaplane carrier
- Displacement: 7,080 long tons (7,190 t) (normal)
- Length: 366 ft (111.6 m) o/a
- Beam: 50 ft 10 in (15.5 m)
- Draught: 18 ft 9 in (5.7 m)
- Installed power: 3 × boilers; 3,000 ihp (2,200 kW)
- Propulsion: 1 × shaft; 1 × triple-expansion steam engine
- Speed: 11 knots (20 km/h; 13 mph)
- Range: 3,030 nmi (5,610 km; 3,490 mi) at 10 knots (19 km/h; 12 mph)
- Complement: 180
- Armament: 4 × single 12 pdr (3 in (76 mm)) guns
- Aircraft carried: 8 × floatplanes

HMS Ark Royal was the first ship designed and built as a seaplane carrier. She was purchased by the Royal Navy in 1914 shortly after her keel had been laid and the ship was only in frames; this allowed the ship's design to be modified almost totally to accommodate seaplanes. During the First World War, Ark Royal participated in the Gallipoli Campaign in early 1915, with her aircraft conducting aerial reconnaissance and observation missions. Her aircraft later supported British troops on the Macedonian Front in 1916, before she returned to the Dardanelles to act as a depot ship for all the seaplanes operating in the area. In January 1918, several of her aircraft unsuccessfully attacked the German battlecruiser SMS Goeben when she sortied from the Dardanelles to attack Allied ships in the area. The ship left the area later in the year to support seaplanes conducting anti-submarine patrols over the southern Aegean Sea.

After the end of the war, Ark Royal mostly served as an aircraft transport and depot ship for those aircraft in support of White Russian and British operations against the Bolsheviks in the Caspian and Black Sea regions during the Allied intervention in the Russian Civil War. She also supported Royal Air Force (RAF) aircraft in British Somaliland in the campaign against Mohammed Abdullah Hassan in 1920. Later that year, the ship was placed in reserve. Ark Royal was recommissioned to ferry an RAF squadron to the Dardanelles during the Chanak Crisis in 1922. She was reduced to reserve again upon her return to the United Kingdom the following year.

The ship was recommissioned in 1930 to serve as a training ship, for seaplane pilots and to evaluate aircraft catapult operations and techniques. She was renamed HMS Pegasus in 1934, freeing the name for the aircraft carrier ordered that year, and continued to serve as a training ship until the beginning of the Second World War in September 1939. Assigned to the Home Fleet at the beginning of the war, she took on tasks as an aircraft transport, in addition to her training duties, until she was modified to serve as the prototype fighter catapult ship in late 1940. This type of ship was intended to defend convoys against attacks by German long-range maritime patrol bombers by launching fighters via their catapult to provide air cover for the convoy. Pegasus served in this role until mid-1941 when she reverted to her previous duties as a training ship. This lasted until early 1944 when she became a barracks ship. The ship was sold in late 1946 and her conversion into a merchant ship began the following year. However, the owner ran out of money during the process and Anita I, as she had been renamed, was seized by her creditors in 1949 and sold for scrap. She was not broken up until late 1950.

== Design and description ==
The Royal Navy had conducted trials in 1913 with a modified cruiser, Hermes, to evaluate the ability of seaplanes to work with the fleet. They were successful enough that the Admiralty allocated £81,000 in the 1914–1915 Naval Programme to purchase a merchant ship for a more thorough modification than had been possible with Hermes to better accommodate seaplanes. A tramp steamer was purchased in 1914 that had just begun construction at the Blyth Shipbuilding Company so it could be easily modified to suit its new role.

Ark Royal was laid down on 7 November 1913 by the Blyth Shipbuilding Company in Blyth, Northumberland, as a freighter, probably intended for the coal-for-grain trade in the Black Sea. She was purchased in May 1914 and was launched on 5 September 1914. The ship was commissioned on 10 December 1914.

Extensive changes to the ship were made in converting her to a seaplane tender, with the superstructure, funnel, and propulsion machinery moved aft and a working deck occupying the forward half of the ship. The deck was not intended as a flying-off deck, but for starting and running up of seaplane engines and for recovering damaged aircraft from the sea. The ship was equipped with a large aircraft hold, 150 feet (45.7 m) long, 45 feet (13.7 m) wide and 15 feet (4.6 m) high along with extensive workshops. Two 3-long-ton (3.0 t) steam cranes on the sides of the forecastle lifted the aircraft through the sliding hatch of the hangar onto the flight deck or into the water. She carried 4,000 imperial gallons (18,000 L; 4,800 US gal) of petrol for her aircraft in standard commercial 2-imperial-gallon (9.1 L; 2.4 US gal) tins.

She could carry five floatplanes and two to four wheeled aircraft. The seaplanes would take off and land in the water alongside the carrier, lifted on and off the ship by cranes; the other aircraft would have to return to land after launch. Her original complement of aircraft consisted of a Short Folder, two Wight Pushers, three Sopwith Type 807 seaplanes and two to four Sopwith Tabloid wheeled aircraft.

Ark Royal had an overall length of 366 feet (111.6 m), a beam of 50 feet 10 inches (15.5 m), and a draught of 18 feet 9 inches (5.7 m). She normally displaced 7,080 long tons (7,190 t), with a displacement of 7,450 long tons (7,570 t) at deep load. The ship had one vertical triple-expansion steam engine driving one propeller shaft. The ship's three cylindrical boilers generated enough steam to produce 3,000 indicated horsepower (2,200 kW) from the engine. The ship had a designed speed of 11 knots (20 km/h; 13 mph); she made a speed of 10.64 knots (19.71 km/h; 12.24 mph) during her sea trials with 2,675 shaft horsepower (1,995 kW) in December 1914. Ark Royal carried 500 tonnes (490 long tons) of fuel oil, enough to give her a range of 3,030 nautical miles (5,610 km; 3,490 mi) at 10 knots (19 km/h; 12 mph).

The ship was armed with four QF 12-pounder 12 cwt guns (Note: "cwt" is the abbreviation for hundredweight, 30 cwt referring to the weight of the gun.) and two machine guns. Her crew totalled 180 officers and men, including 60 aviation personnel. "Her truly unique feature was the steadying sail on the mizzen to help keep her head to the wind; she remains the only aircraft carrier to have been fitted with a sail."

== Service ==
=== First World War ===
The ship proved to be too slow to work with the Grand Fleet and for operations in the North Sea in general, so Ark Royal was ordered to the Mediterranean in mid-January 1915 to support the Gallipoli campaign. Under the command of Commander Robert Clark-Hall, the ship sailed on 1 February 1915 and arrived at the island of Tenedos on 17 February. She attempted to fly three of her seaplanes on the day of her arrival to reconnoitre the Straits, but two of them had engine troubles and the third could not take off because the water was too calm, a common problem with many early seaplanes. A Wight Pusher eventually managed to get into the air and discovered new fortifications down the Straits; it dropped a single 20-pound (9.1 kg) bomb on the Asiatic side of the Dardanelles and returned with seven bullet holes in its skin. Two days later, the ship's aircraft attempted unsuccessfully to spot for the fleet as they bombarded the Ottoman fortifications defending the Straits. They conducted more aerial reconnaissance and observation missions in support of the fleet later in the month and in early March as it moved further up the Straits. Ark Royal lost her first aircraft on 5 March as the propeller of one of her Sopwiths splintered into pieces at 3,000 feet (910 m). Both of the aircraft's crewmen were recovered by the destroyer HMS Usk.

Later in the month, the ship's aircrew learned to spot mines from the air and were moderately successful, although they failed to detect the minefield that sank one French and two British predreadnoughts and damaged a British battlecruiser on 18 March. Later in the month, Ark Royal and her aircraft were relieved by No. 3 Squadron of the Royal Naval Air Service (RNAS). In preparation for the squadron's arrival, the ship's crew cleared a vineyard on the island to serve as an airfield and unloaded its crated aircraft on 26–27 March. From 31 March to 7 April, Ark Royal and her companions made several fake landing attempts and her aircraft bombarded the port of Smyrna with little effect. When she returned to Tenedos on 8 April, she exchanged her Tabloids, which had never flown from the ship, for a pair of Sopwith Schneider single-seat floatplanes. In addition, she received two Sopwith Type 860s, another Wight Pusher, and a Short Type 166, all two-seat floatplanes, as replacements. The ship had no room for all these aircraft and she used the collier Penmorvalt to store them and for additional workshop space. Her aircraft resumed reconnaissance and observation missions over the Dardanelles; aircraft discovered a large ammunition dump on 12 April, and provided corrective data to direct gunfire from HMS Lord Nelson onto the target.

Ark Royal's aircraft provided support to the Australian and New Zealand troops at Anzac Cove as they landed on 25 April on the Gallipoli Peninsula. Two days later, the ship was taken under fire by the Ottoman predreadnought Turgut Reis, firing across the peninsula, and she had to move in a hurry to avoid being hit. A month later, the battle on the peninsula had bogged down and the success of the German submarine U-21 in sinking two British predreadnoughts forced Ark Royal to move to a safer anchorage at Imbros at the end of May. There she became a depot ship for all the seaplanes in the area, while her own aircraft continued to support operations at Gallipoli. On occasion, aircraft were loaned out to other ships for reconnaissance or observation missions.

The ship left Imbros on 1 November for Mytilene, from where her aircraft flew aerial reconnaissance missions over Smyrna, before she continued onwards to Salonika, where she arrived on 8 November. While based there, her aircraft supported British troops fighting the Bulgarians, spotted for British ships conducting shore bombardments, and conducted anti-submarine patrols. At this time, Ark Royal operated five Short 166s and a couple of Sopwith seaplanes. On 27 March 1917, the ship was transferred to Mudros to serve as a depot ship for all the seaplanes assigned to No. 2 Wing RNAS, which controlled all RNAS aircraft in the area. By the end of 1917, she operated a mixture of Short Type 184 and Sopwith Baby aircraft.

On the morning of 20 January 1918, the Ottoman battlecruiser Yavûz Sultân Selîm, together with the light cruiser Midilli (formerly the German Goeben and Breslau, and still with German crews), sortied from the Dardanelles to attack British warships based at Mudros. Yavuz struck a mine shortly after they exited the mouth of the Dardanelles so they switched targets and sank two British monitors off Imbros Island. As they were returning to the Dardanelles, the two ships were attacked by two of Ark Royal's Sopwith Babies with 65-pound (29 kg) bombs. One Baby was quickly shot down and the other was forced to make an emergency landing with engine problems off Imbros; the pilot was able to taxi the aircraft onto a beach and it was recovered several days later. Midilli struck five mines and sank on the return whilst Yavuz struck two more mines and then ran aground inside the Straits. Ark Royal's Short 184s attempted to bomb her at dawn on the following morning, but all ten bombs missed, and an attempt to attack the ship with a Short 184 modified to carry a 14-inch (356 mm) torpedo failed when the weight of the torpedo proved to be more than the aircraft could lift.

On 3 April, the ship was transferred to the island of Syros, where she could support the seaplanes of No. 62 Wing of the Royal Air Force (RAF) on anti-submarine patrols; part of the former No. 2 Wing RNAS redesignated when the RNAS and the Royal Flying Corps were merged to form the RAF. Ark Royal was transferred to Piraeus in October and was still there when the Armistice of Mudros with Turkey was signed on 31 October. The ship joined the Allied fleet that occupied Constantinople after the surrender.

=== Interwar years and the Second World War ===
After the war, Ark Royal transported aircraft across the Black Sea to Batumi, where they were ferried across the Caucasus to the British naval forces supporting White Russian forces fighting the Bolsheviks in the Caspian Sea during the Russian Civil War. The ship was withdrawn from the Black Sea in late 1919 and disembarked her seaplanes at Malta to load a dozen Airco DH.9 bombers and 181 personnel of the supporting Z Force for transport to British Somaliland. The ship arrived in Berbera on 30 December and the squadron was unloaded to support the air and land campaign against the Dervish state. Ark Royal served during this campaign solely as a depot and repair ship for the RAF. She was withdrawn before its conclusion and transferred to the Black Sea to support the White Russian forces there as they began to collapse. The ship twice ferried refugees from the Caucasian coast to the Crimea and, after the second voyage, had to be fumigated at Constantinople after an outbreak of typhus among her passengers. During the summer of 1920, Ark Royal ferried RAF aircraft and personnel to Basra. She then returned to Britain for a refit and was put into reserve at Rosyth in November.

She was recommissioned in September 1922 to transport 4 Squadron, equipped with a dozen Bristol F.2 Fighters, out to the Dardanelles during the Chanak crisis. The aircraft were ferried semi-assembled and then transferred to the aircraft carrier Argus where they were fully assembled. On 11 October, the F.2s flew from the carrier to an airfield at Kilya on the European side of the straits. The ship remained in the area until she was given a brief refit at Malta in early 1923. Now equipped with Fairey IIID seaplanes, Ark Royal returned to the Dardanelles until she was transferred back to the United Kingdom late in the year. Upon her arrival, the ship was placed back in reserve and became the depot ship for the reserve of minesweepers at Sheerness until 1930.

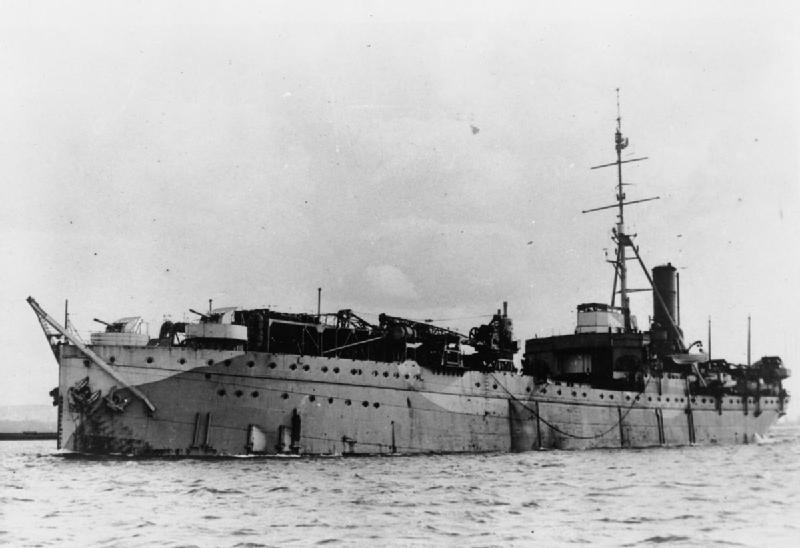
HMS Pegasus at anchor during World War II

In 1930, Ark Royal was recommissioned again as a training ship and an aircraft catapult was installed on her forecastle, forward of her cranes. For the next nine years, the ship conducted trials and evaluations of catapults and seaplane launch and recovery equipment and techniques. On 21 December 1934, she was renamed HMS Pegasus to release her name for a new carrier that was then beginning construction. The ship was assigned to the Home Fleet when the Second World War began, and was mostly used to train sailors in catapult launching and shipboard recovery techniques. The ship used the Fairey Seafox, Supermarine Walrus, and Fairey Swordfish of 764 Naval Air Squadron. She also served as an aircraft transport and was present in Scapa Flow, having just delivered some aircraft, on 14 October 1939 when the battleship Royal Oak was sunk by the German submarine U-47. As the closest ship to Royal Oak, Pegasus was able to rescue some 400 survivors.

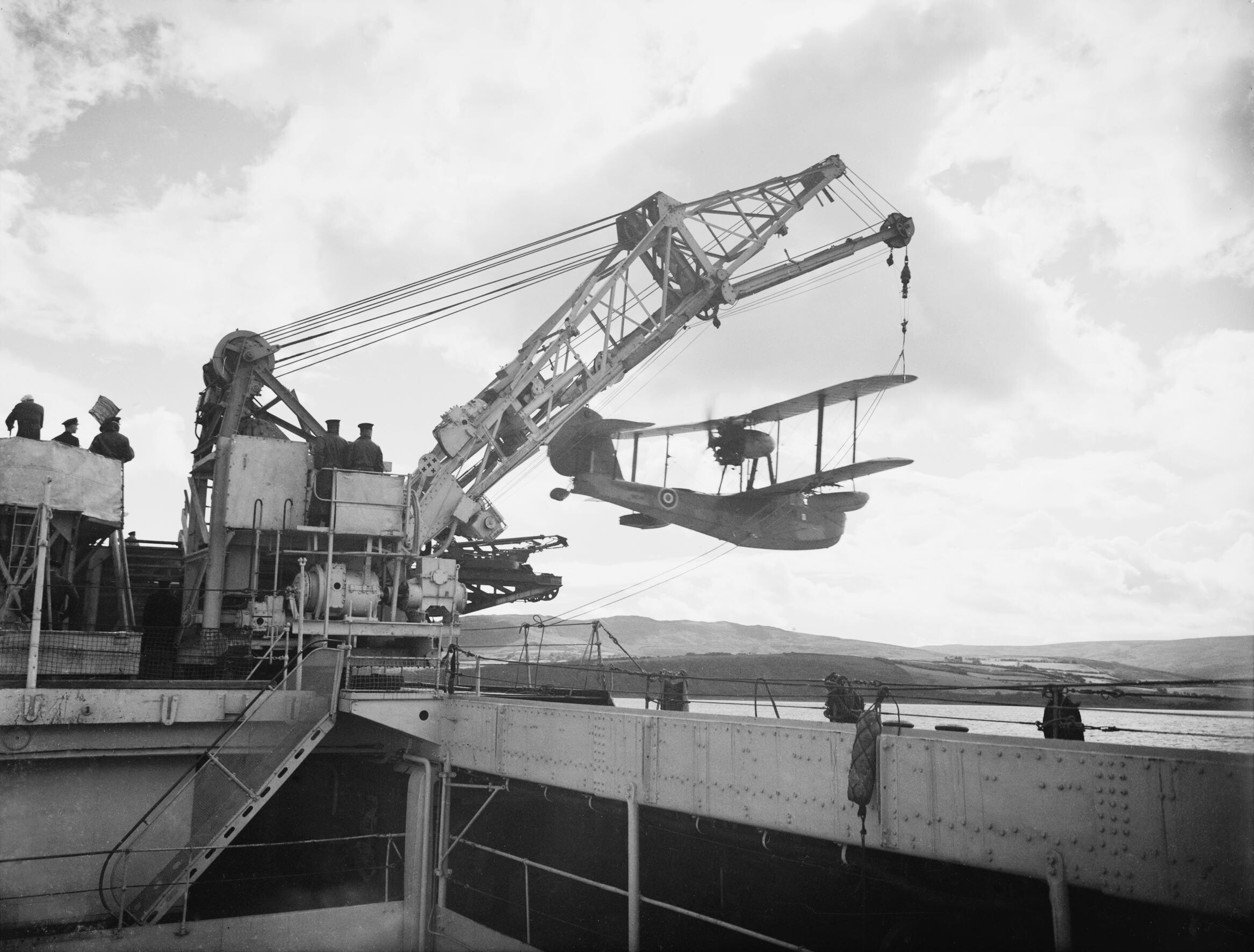
A Supermarine Walrus amphibious aircraft making a low pass near seaplane tender HMS Pegasus, September 1942

Pegasus was converted to the prototype fighter catapult ship in November 1940, carrying three Fairey Fulmar fighters from 807 Naval Air Squadron between 1 December and 10 February 1941, which were replaced by aircraft from 804 Naval Air Squadron between 10 February and 23 July. These fighters were supposed to defend convoys against attacks from Focke-Wulf Fw 200 maritime patrol bombers and to prevent them from radioing location reports to U-boats. If out of range of land, the fighters would have to ditch at sea and hope to be recovered by a ship from their convoy. The ship escorted nine convoys between December 1940 and July 1941. At some point during the war, the ship's anti-aircraft armament was supplemented with a pair of Oerlikon 20 mm light anti-aircraft guns mounted in the bow, the ship's bridge was enlarged and the mast was replaced with a tripod mast bearing a Type 291 air warning radar. The ship then became a seaplane training ship again, hosting 763 NAS aboard from 20 April 1942 to 13 February 1944. Pegasus then became a barracks ship until May 1946 and was then listed for disposal in June.

She was sold to R. C. Ellerman on 18 October, renamed Anita I, and registered under the Panamanian flag. Under the management of the Compania de Navigation Ellanita, the ship sailed from Cardiff to Antwerp in October 1947 to begin conversion to a freighter. The work ceased in early 1948 and Anita I was seized by her creditors and auctioned off to a Dutch shipbreaking firm on 16 June 1949. She was resold once more before the ship was purchased by the British Iron and Steel Corporation in October 1950. Later that year, the ship was broken up for scrap at Thos. W. Ward, Grays, Essex.

== Footnotes ==
Preceded by 1587	HMS Ark Royal; 1914–1946	Succeeded by 91
