= Raid on Cuxhaven =

1914 air raid on Cuxhaven, Germany

Coordinates: 53°51′40″N 08°41′40″E

Raid on Cuxhave
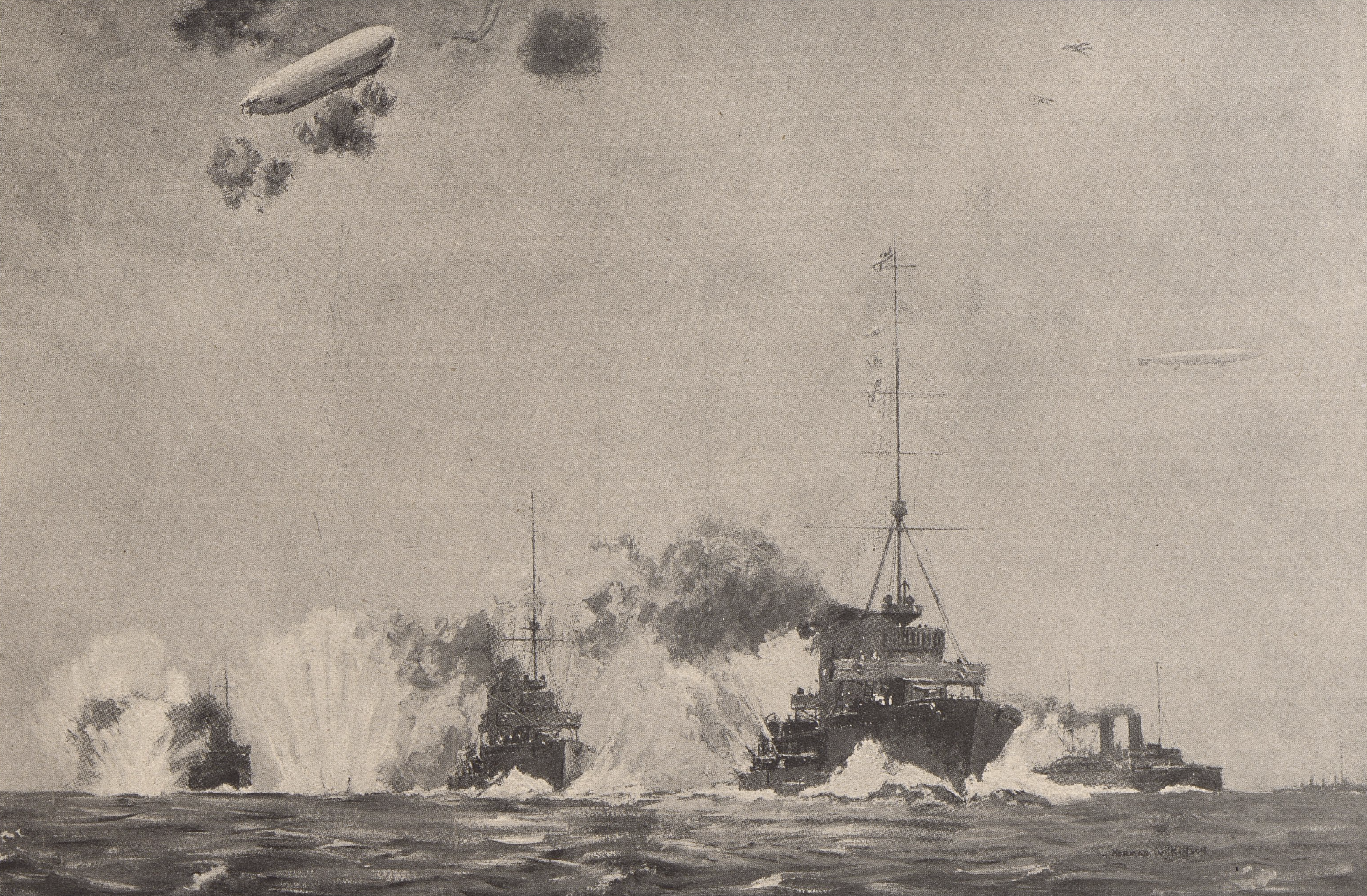
- Advance of the English cruisers on Cuxhaven; Norman Wilkinson, 1914
- Operational scope: Tactical bombing
- Planned by: Royal Navy, Royal Naval Air Service
- Objective: Attack on Zeppelin airships at Nordholz Naval Airbase
- Date: Began 25 December 1914
- Executed by: Harwich Force; 8th Submarine Flotilla

The raid on Cuxhaven (German: Weihnachtsangriff, Christmas Raid) was a British ship-based air-raid on the Imperial German Navy at Cuxhaven mounted on Christmas Day, 1914. Aircraft of the Royal Naval Air Service were carried to within striking distance by seaplane tenders of the Royal Navy, supported by ships and submarines.

The aircraft flew over the Cuxhaven area and dropped their bombs, causing damage to shore installations. It was described as an "air reconnaissance of the Heligoland Bight, including Cuxhaven, Heligoland and Wilhelmshaven ... by naval seaplanes" during which "the opportunity was taken of attacking with bombs points of military importance" in northern Imperial Germany.

== Background ==
=== Nordholz airship base ===
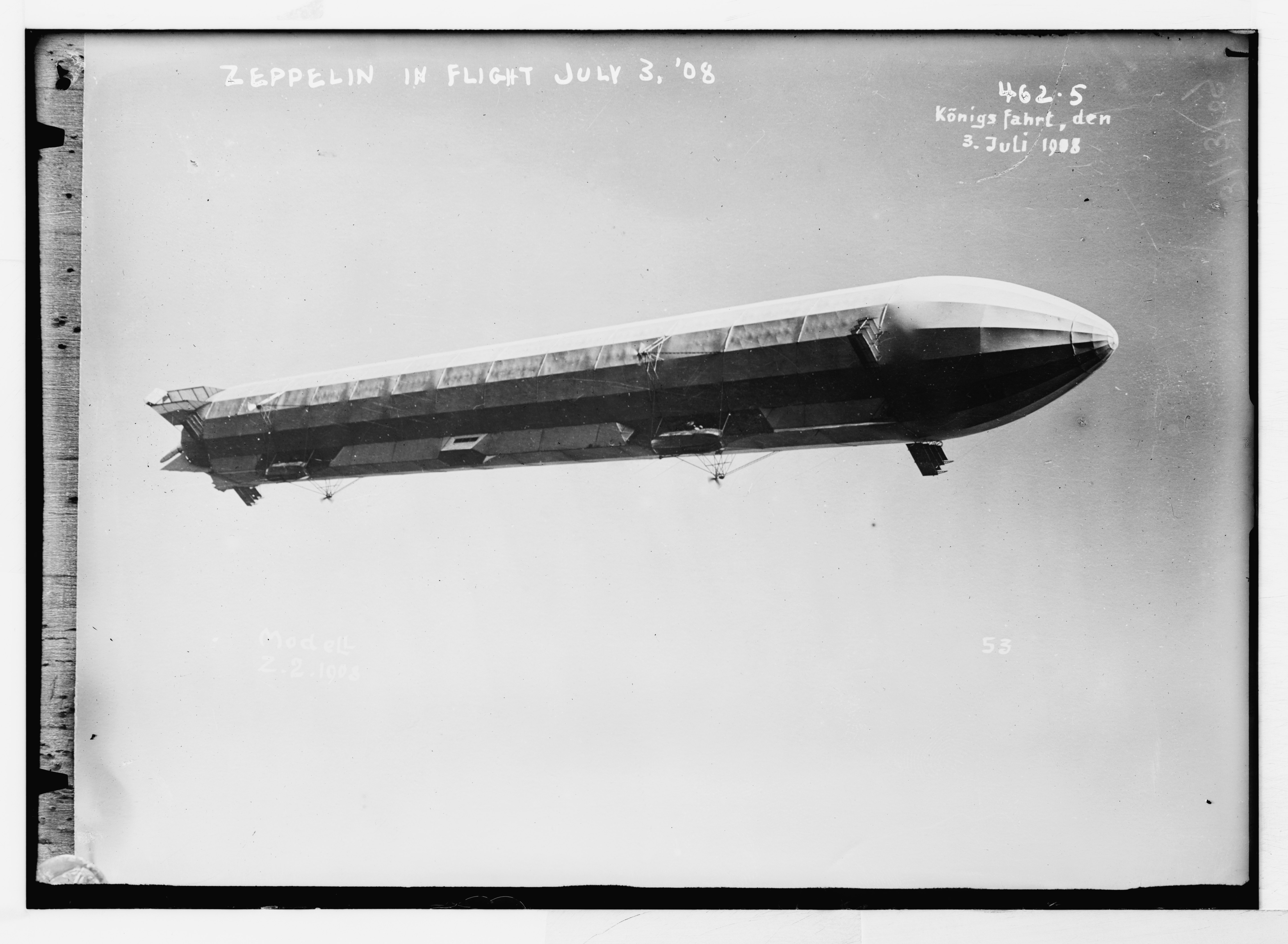
Photograph of a Zeppelin in flight, 3 July 1908

Nordholz Naval Airbase was about 8 mi (13 km) south of Cuxhaven, amidst orchards. In August 1914 the base had been made the headquarters of the Naval Airship Division (Marine-Luftschiff-Abteilung). A gigantic shed had been built containing two parallel hangars, 597 ft (182 m) long. The 4,000-long-ton (4,100 t) shed was built on a turntable to rotate the hangar doors into wind. With an airship base near Hamburg which housed another two airships, the four operational naval airships available for operations over the North Sea were accommodated. The four airships were Zeppelins, built in 1914, were 518 ft (158 m) long, contained 794,000 cu ft (22,500 m^{3}) of hydrogen, had three engines and a speed of 50 mph (80 km/h). The Zeppelins had a crew of 24 each and could lift several hundred pounds of bombs.

== Plan ==
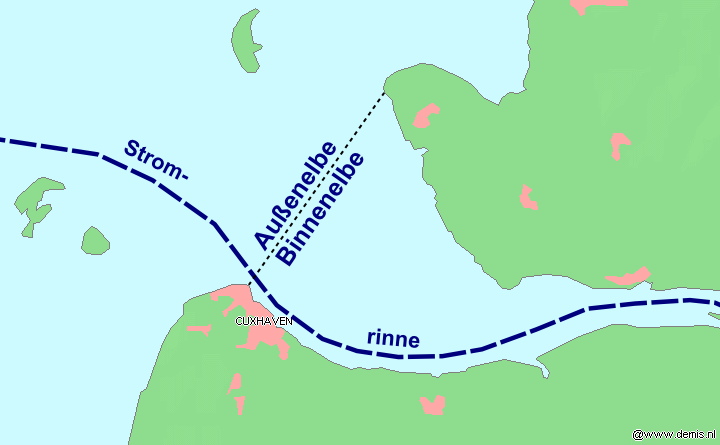
Location of Cuxhaven in Lower Saxony on the Elbe River

The Zeppelin sheds at Nordholz were out of range of land-based British aircraft. A plan was developed for the seaplane tenders HMS Engadine, (Squadron-commander Cecil Malone, air commander for the raid) Riviera (Lieutenant E. D. M. Robertson) and Empress (Lieutenant Frederick Bowhill), supported by the destroyers of the Harwich Force, the Oversea Submarine Flotilla (Commodore Reginald Tyrwhitt) and the attached cruisers, HMS Arethusa, Fearless and Undaunted, to launch three seaplanes each, from a point north of Helgoland in the German Bight. The objective was to reconnoitre military installations and if possible, bomb the Zeppelin sheds at Cuxhaven. Lieutenant Erskine Childers RNVR (yachtsman and author of The Riddle of the Sands) who had sailed the area before the war, provided the navigational briefing and accompanied Flight Commander Cecil Kilner as navigator and observer.

== Raid ==
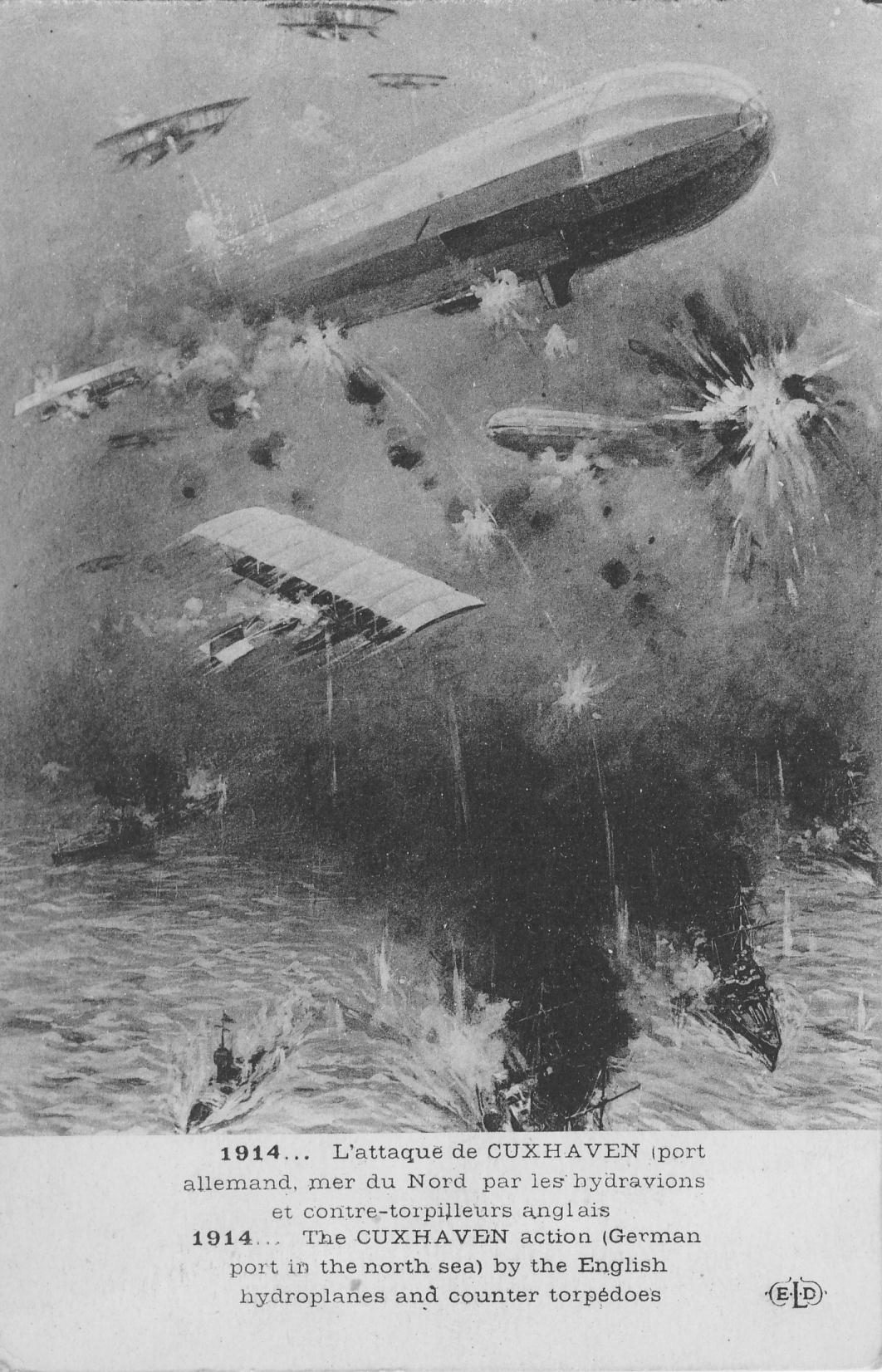
Artist's impression of the raid

On Christmas Day, 1914, the first combined sea and air strike was executed by the Royal Navy, aimed at locating and if possible bombing the dirigible sheds housing German Zeppelins, to forestall attacks by the airships on Britain. The air temperature was just above 0 °C and of the nine seaplanes lowered to the water, only seven (three Short Improved Type 74 "Folders", two Short Type 81 Folders and two Short Type 135 Folders, all carrying three 20 lb (9.1 kg) bombs) were able to start their engines and take off. Those unable to take part, a Short Type 81 (serial no. 122) and a Short "Improved Type 74" (serial no. 812), were winched back on board. (Note: Sources differ as to the identity of at least some of these aircraft; the record of Flt. Lt. Edmonds' career reports him as flying a Type 74 with RNAS serial number 811; Barnes and James (Appendix F, p.527) assigns this serial number to a later type with folding wings, also with a 100 hp (75 kW) Gnome engine, known by the Admiralty as the "Short Improved Type 74" (bearing RNAS serial numbers 811–818) that were assigned to the Engadine, Riviera, and Empress, 811, 814 and 815 took part in the action. A further "Improved Type 74" bearing the RNAS serial no. 812 was one of those unable to start its engine.)

Fog, low cloud and anti-aircraft fire prevented the raid from being a complete success, although several sites were attacked. Nevertheless, the raid demonstrated the feasibility of attack by ship-borne aircraft and showed the strategic importance of this new weapon. According to a telegram dated 7 January 1915, the "Admiralty Chief Censor intercepted message from Hartvig, Kjobenhaven to the Daily Mail, reporting that the British aerial raid on Cuxhaven [Germany] had forced the German Admiralty to remove the greater part of the High Seas Fleet from Cuxhaven to various places on the Kiel Canal."

The crews of all seven aircraft survived the raid, having been airborne for over three hours. Three aircraft, a Short 'Improved Type 74' (RNAS serial no. 811, flown by Flt. Lt. Charles Edmonds), a Short Admiralty Type 81 (RNAS serial no. 119, Flt. Cdr. R. P. Ross), and a Short Admiralty Type 135 (RNAS serial no. 136, Flt. Cdr. C. F. Kilner with Lt. Erskine Childers as his observer), regained their tenders and were recovered. The "Admiralty Type 81", RNAS serial no. 120, Flt. Lt. A. J. Miley, and two Short 'Improved Type 74' folders, RNAS serial nos. 814 (Flt. Sub-Lt. V. Gaskell-Blackburn) and 815 (Flt. Cdr. D. A. Oliver) landed off the East Friesian island of Norderney and their crews were taken on board the submarine E11, under the command of Lieutenant-Commander Martin Nasmith (the aircraft being scuttled to prevent them from falling into enemy hands); the seventh aircraft, a Short Admiralty Type 135 (RNAS serial no. 135) piloted by Flt. Lt. Francis Hewlett, suffered engine problems and was seen to ditch into the sea about 8 nmi (15 km; 9.2 mi) off Helgoland. Hewlett was posted as missing but he was found by the Dutch trawler Marta van Hattem, which took him on board and returned him to the port of IJmuiden in the Netherlands, where he disembarked on 2 January 1915. whence he made his way back to Britain.

=== High Seas Fleet ===
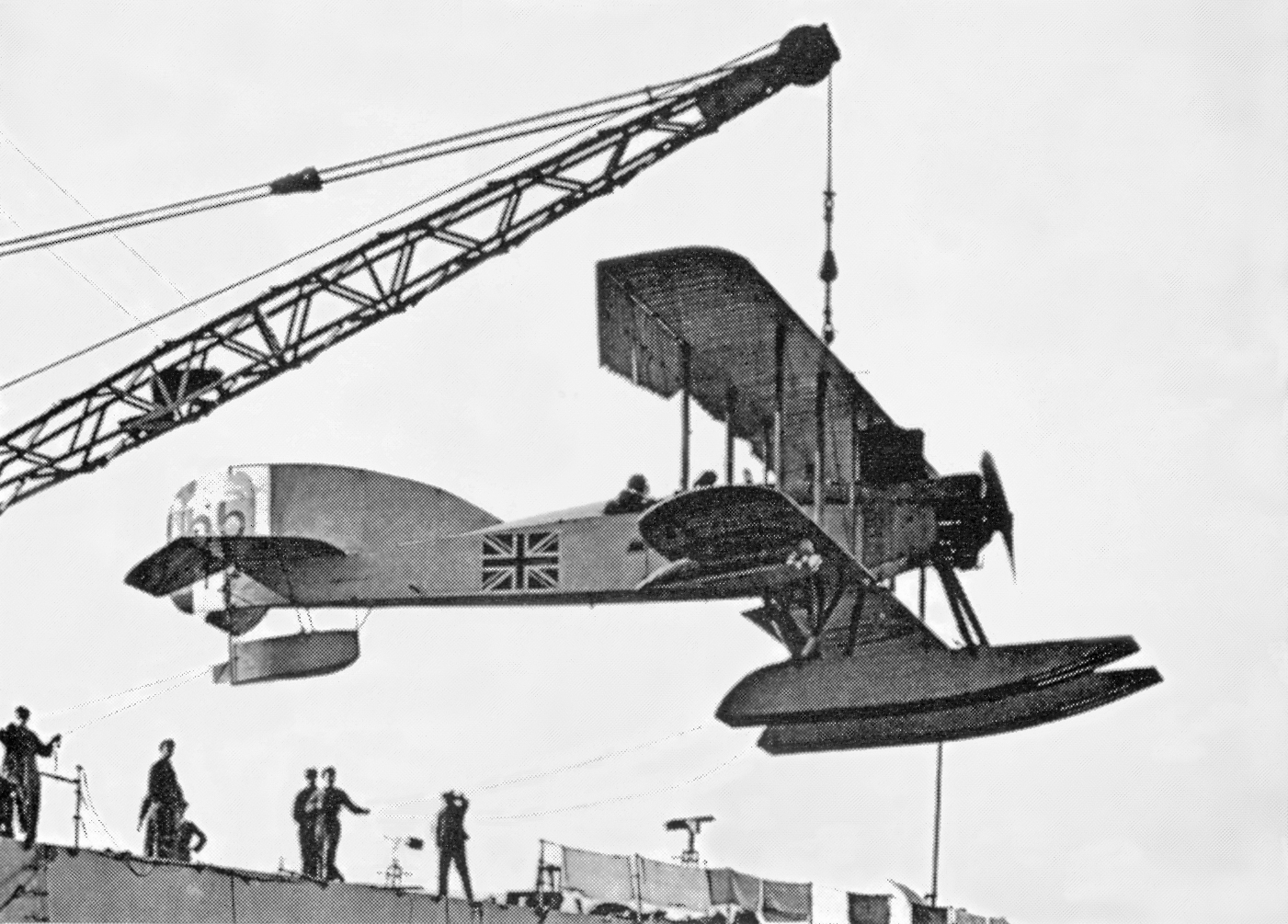
Example of a Short 166

The German High Seas Fleet (Hochseeflotte) stayed in port during the raid and missed an opportunity to defeat an isolated part of the Grand Fleet, even when it became clear that the main force of the Grand Fleet was nowhere near the British flotilla. Even a small force of cruisers would have sufficed to outgun the British ships. The German Naval Staff misunderstood British intentions, having expected an incursion into the German Bight. The Germans knew that the British had been assembling merchant ships to disguise as battleships and battle cruisers. The German Naval Staff thought that these ships were intended to be used as blockships to be sunk in river mouths and estuaries to trap the HSF and expected that the Grand Fleet would accompany the raiders. The Germans received a tip-off on 24 December that the British operation was due the next day and would be of such magnitude that only the HSF would be sufficient to counter it and that this would contravene the ruling by the Kaiser that the fleet was not to be risked.

=== Marine-Fliegerabteilung ===
The Navy Air Department of the Imperial German Navy (Kaiserliche Marine) sent seaplanes and airships to discover the position of the attacking force. The Friedrichshafen FF.19 (seaplane No. 85) stayed aloft for five hours 52 minutes, a remarkable achievement for the period. Another seaplane from Heligoland spotted the British but not having a wireless transmitter, had to return to the island to report. Sighting was also made by the airship L6 but due to a generator failure, reporting was not initially made. The attacking force had been sailing in formation at a speed of 20 kn (37 km/h; 23 mph) but due to boiler difficulties, this speed could not be made by Empress, that lagged astern of the formation and the first combat was against this vessel. Two Friedrichshafen seaplanes attacked with bombs and although one small bomb exploded only 20 ft (6.1 m) off the bow, no damage was done to the ship or crew. Zeppelin L6 attacked with bombs and machine-guns. The crew of Empress attempted to drive the Zeppelin away, initially with rifle fire as their 12-pounder in the stern was blanked by the superstructure. No damage was done to the ship, seaplanes or airship.

=== U-boats ===
Further attacks on the retiring force were attempted by submarines U-20, U-22, and U-30 but the manoeuvres of the British fleet prevented any success. The British force returned to home waters without loss or damage.

== Aftermath ==
=== Analysis ===
In 1994, Paul Halpern wrote that the Cuxhaven raid was an imaginative endeavour, showing the willingness amongst naval and military leaders to adopt new technology and foreshadowed the air-sea battles of the future. It was a boost to British morale, and pointed the way to ways in which aircraft could be made more effective.

The Cuxhaven raid marks the first employment of the seaplanes of the Naval Air Service in an attack on the enemy's harbours from the sea, and, apart altogether from the results achieved, is an occasion of historical moment. Not only so, but for the first time in history a naval attack has been delivered simultaneously above, on, and from below the surface of the water.

— The Editor (Stanley Spooner), Flight, 1915

=== Decorations ===
For their part in the Cuxhaven Raid, Kilner and Edmonds were awarded the Distinguished Service Order (DSO); Chief Petty Officer Mechanic James William Bell and Chief Petty Officer Mechanic Gilbert Howard William Budds were awarded the Distinguished Service Medal (DSM).

== See also ==
- Tondern raid
