= Short Type 827 =

British two-seat reconnaissance floatplane

Short 827 and 830
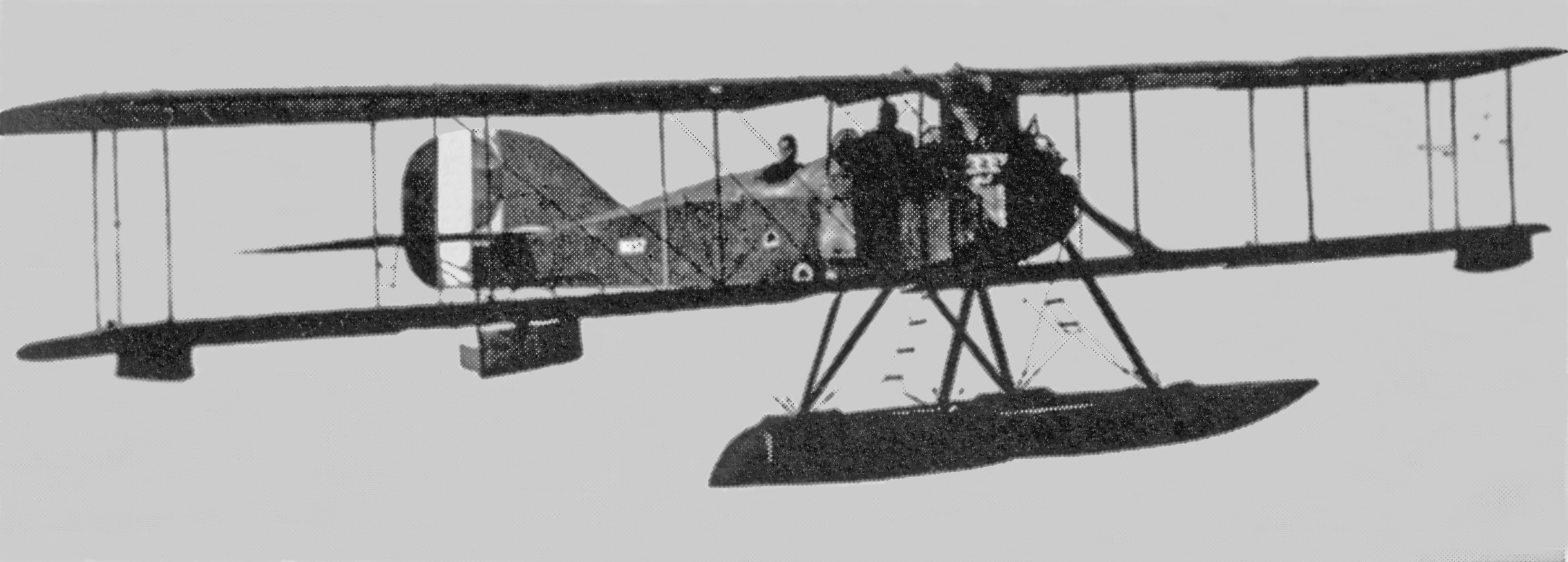
- Short Type 827 (8237), at Lee-on-Solent, 1918, drastically altered with equal-span constant-chord three-bay wings

General information
- Type: Reconnaissance
- National origin: United Kingdom
- Manufacturer: Short Brothers
- Primary user: Royal Naval Air Service
- Number built: 108 (Type 827); 18 (Type 830)

History
- First flight: 1914

The Short Type 827 was a 1910s British two-seat reconnaissance floatplane. It was also known as the Short Admiralty Type 827.

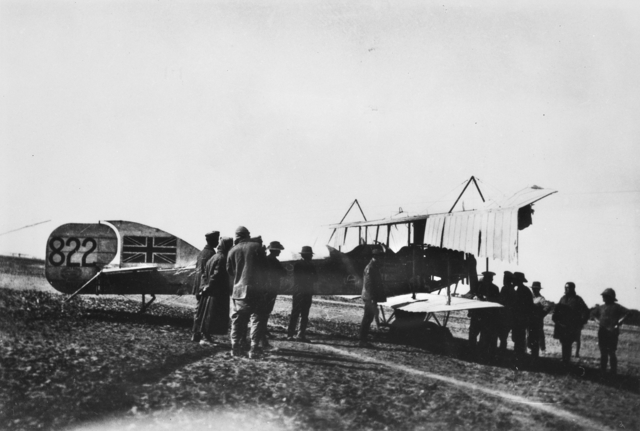
The first production Short Type 827 with members of the Australian Flying Corps

== Design and development ==
The Short Type 827 was a two-bay biplane with unswept unequal-span wings, a slightly smaller development of the Short Type 166. It had a box-section fuselage mounted on the lower wing. It had twin floats under the forward fuselage, plus small floats fitted at the wingtips and tail. It was powered by a nose-mounted 155 hp (116 kW) Sunbeam Nubian engine, with a two-bladed tractor propeller. The crew of two sat in open cockpits in tandem.

The aircraft was built by Short Brothers (36 aircraft,) and also produced by different contractors around the United Kingdom, i.e. Brush Electrical (20), Parnall (20), Fairey (12) and Sunbeam (20).

The Short Type 830 was a variant, powered by a 135 hp (101 kW) Salmson water-cooled radial engine.

== Variants ==
Type 827
Production aircraft with a Sunbeam Nubian engine, 108 built.
Type 830
Variant powered by a 135 hp (100 kW) Salmson 18 built.
S.301
A batch of ten tractor seaplanes, officially listed as Type 830s, with a 140 hp (104 kW) Salmson-Canton-Unné engine, are sometimes described as Short S.301s after the sequence/construction number of the first aircraft. It was a hybrid design, with the wings and fuselage of the Short Type 166, and the straight-edged ailerons and forward observer's position of the Type 830.

== Operators ==
Belgium

- Belgian Air Force

United Kingdom

- Royal Naval Air Service

== Specifications (Type 827) ==
Data from Orbis 1985

General characteristics

- Crew: two (pilot, observer)
- Length: 35 ft 3 in (10.74 m)
- Wingspan: 53 ft 11 in (16.43 m)
- Height: 13 ft 6 in (4.11 m)
- Wing area: 506 sq ft (47.0 m^{2})
- Empty weight: 2,700 lb (1,225 kg)
- Gross weight: 3,400 lb (1,542 kg)
- Powerplant: 1 × Sunbeam Nubian water-cooled V-8 engine, 150 hp (110 kW)

Performance

- Maximum speed: 62 mph (100 km/h, 54 kn)
- Endurance: 3 hr 30 min

Armament

- Guns: 1 x .303 Lewis Gun on flexible mount in rear cockpit
- Bombs: Provision for light bombs on underwing racks

== See also ==
- Short Folder

Related development

- Short Type 166

Related lists

- List of aircraft of the Royal Naval Air Service
- List of flying boats and floatplanes

== Bibliography ==
- Barnes C.H. & James D.N (1989). Shorts Aircraft since 1900. London: Putnam. p. 560. ISBN 0-85177-819-4.
- Bruce, J.M (1956). "The Short Seaplanes: Historic Military Aircraft No 14: Part II". Flight. No. 21 December 1956. pp. 965–968.
- Bruce, J.M (1957). "The Short Seaplanes: Historic Military Aircraft No 14: Part IV". Flight. No. 4 January 1957. pp. 23–24.
- Klaauw, Bart van der (March–April 1999). "Unexpected Windfalls: Accidentally or Deliberately, More than 100 Aircraft 'arrived' in Dutch Territory During the Great War". Air Enthusiast (80): 54–59. ISSN 0143-5450.
