= Salmson water-cooled aero-engines =

Radial piston aircraft engine family

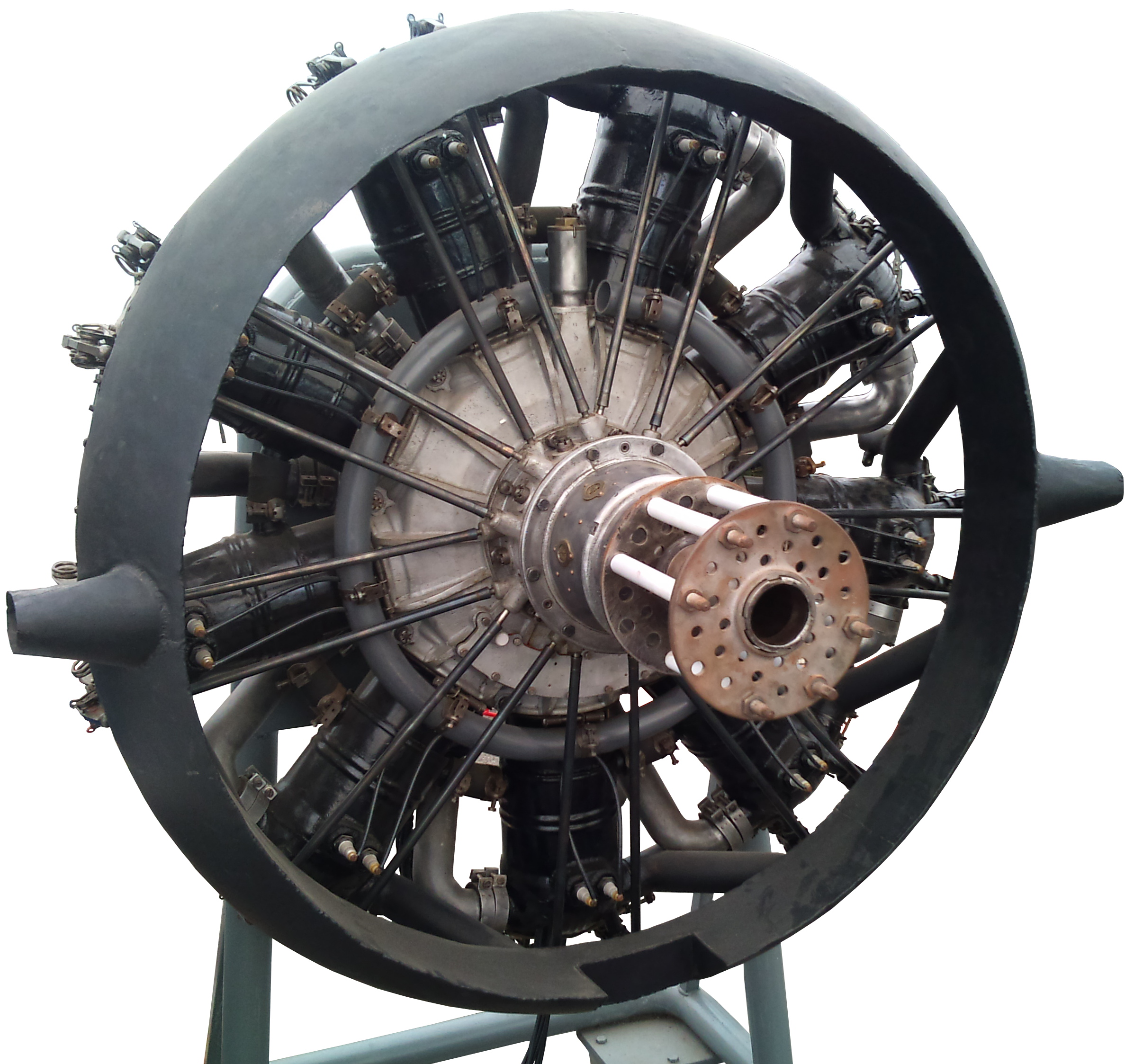
- A Salmson 9Z water-cooled radial engine
- Type: Water-cooled multi cylinder barrel and radial engines
- National origin: France
- Manufacturer: Société des Moteurs Salmson
- First run: 1908

The Salmson water-cooled aero-engines, produced in France by Société des Moteurs Salmson from 1908 until 1920, were a series of pioneering aero-engines: unusually combining water-cooling with the radial arrangement of their cylinders.

== History ==
Henri Salmson, a manufacturer of water pumps, was engaged by Georges Marius Henri-Georges Canton and Pierre Unné, a pair of Swiss engineers, to produce engines to their design. Their initial efforts were on barrel engines, but these failed to meet expectations due to low reliability and high fuel consumption caused by internal friction.

A new 7-cylinder water-cooled radial design was then developed by Canton and Unné. The range was expanded to produce 9-cylinder models, and also two-row 14-cylinder and 18-cylinder engines. By 1912 the Salmson A9 was producing around 120 brake horsepower; while competitive with rival designs from French companies, Salmson, Canton and Unné decided to develop more powerful engines as their rivals were concentrating on engines of lower power.

The engines were produced at Salmson's factory at Billancourt, which was expanded during the First World War, and a second factory was opened at Villeurbanne. The Salmson-(Canton-Unne) series of water-cooled engines were also built by licensees in Russia and in Great Britain at the Dudbridge Iron Works Limited at Stroud in Gloucestershire between 1914 and 1918.

== Applications ==
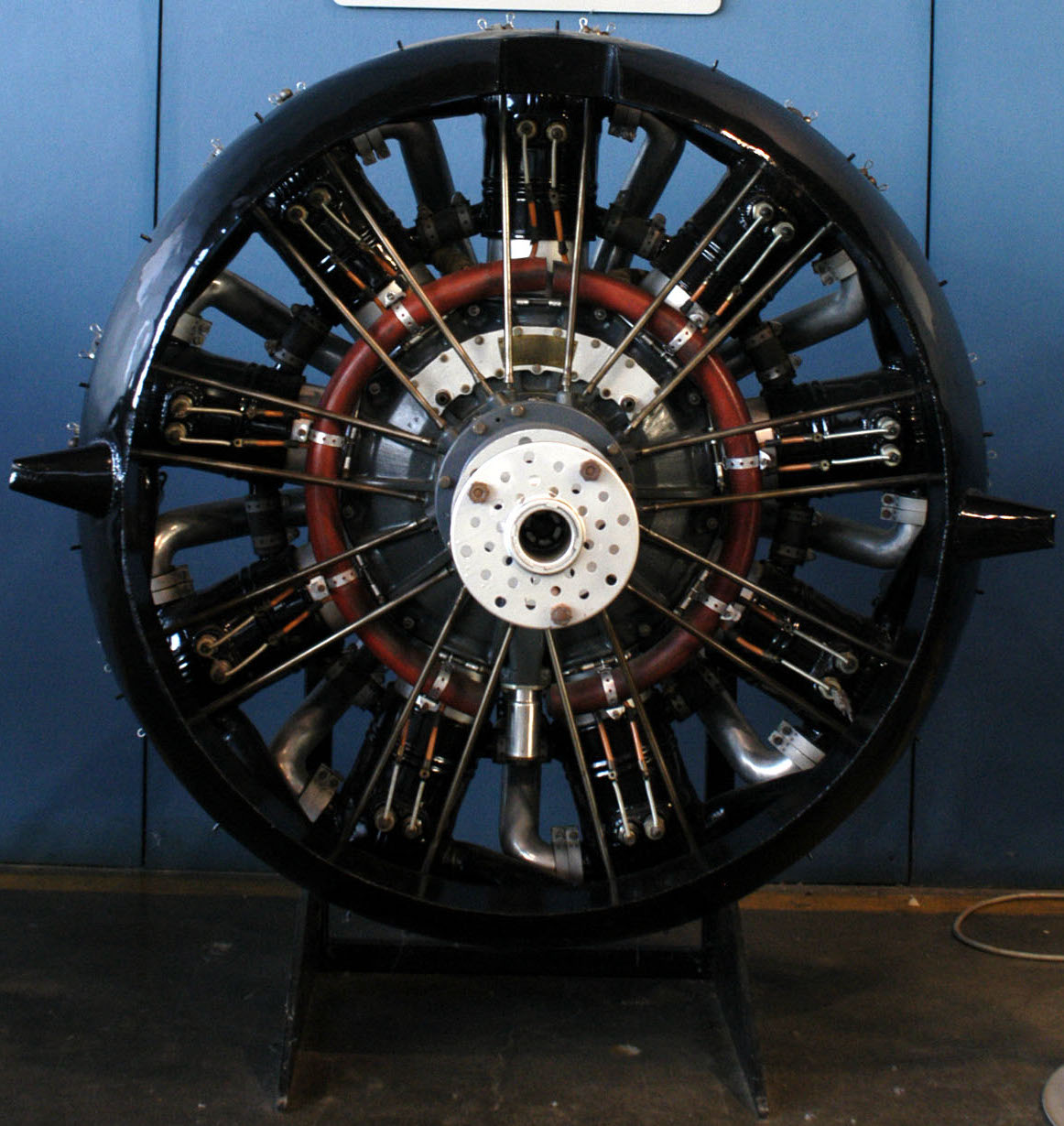
A Salmson 9Z in the National Museum of the United States Air Force

Data from:LA SOCIETE DES MOTEURS SALMSON Aircraft powered by Salmson water-cooled engines included:

Salmson 9A

- Salmson-Moineau S.M.1
- Salmson-Moineau S.M.2

Salmson 9B

- Short S.74
- Short type 135
- Short type 830

Salmson 9C

- Farman 60

Salmson 9M

- Blackburn type L
- Bréguet U2
- Breguet 14 prototype
- Voisin LA 3

Salmson 9P

- Farman HF.27
- Voisin LA 5

Salmson 9R

- Anatra DS
- Lebed 12

Salmson 9Z

- Besson H-5
- Caudron C.23
- Farman HF.30
- Farman 60
- Hanriot HD.3
- Hanriot H.26
- Latécoère 3
- Salmson 2 Berline
- Salmson 2A2
- Vickers Vimy prototype
- Voisin Triplane

Salmson 2M7

- Kennedy Giant
- Sopwith type C
- Sopwith Bat Boat II
- Short type 166
- Sopwith type 860
- Wight Navyplane

Salmson 18Cm

- Hanriot H.25

== Variants and specifications ==
Some sources named the radial versions as Salmson (Canton-Unne) which refers to the Swiss engineers which engaged Salmson to build engines to their designs.

Salmson water-cooled aero-engines produced up to 1918
Name	Cylinders	Year	Bore	Stroke	Capacity	Power	Remarks
Salmson A	2 x 7-cyl barrel	1908	75 mm (2.953 in)	125 mm (4.921 in)	7.7 L (469.88 cu in)	37.285 kW (50 hp) at 800rpm	Barrel engine 1 built bench tests only
Salmson B	2 x 7-cyl barrel	1910	75 mm (2.953 in)	125 mm (4.921 in)	7.7 L (469.88 cu in)	37.285 kW (50 hp) at 800rpm	1 built bench tests only.
Salmson C	2 x 7-cyl barrel	1910	85 mm (3.346 in)	95 mm (3.740 in)	8 L (488.19 cu in)	44.74 kW (60 hp) at 1100rpm	1 built with rotary inlet valves.
Salmson D	2 x 7-cyl barrel	1910	85 mm (3.346 in)	95 mm (3.740 in)	8 L (488.19 cu in)	44.74 kW (60 hp) at 1100rpm	1 built with rotary inlet valves.
Salmson E	2 x 9-cyl barrel	1911	110 mm (4.331 in)	130 mm (5.118 in)	22 L (1,342.52 cu in)	55.93 kW (75 hp)	1 built – timed valves.
Salmson F	2 x 9-cyl barrel	1911	110 mm (4.331 in)	130 mm (5.118 in)	22 L (1,342.52 cu in)	55.93 kW (75 hp) at 1200 rpm	1 built – timed valves.
Salmson K	2 x 7-cyl barrel	1912	85 mm (3.346 in)	105 mm (4.134 in)	11 L (671.26 cu in)	63.4 kW (85 hp) at 1200 rpm	1 built – automatic inlet valves.
Salmson A7	7-cyl radial	1911	120 mm (4.724 in)	140 mm (5.512 in)	11 L (671.26 cu in)	59.65 kW (80 hp) – 74.57 kW (100 hp)	5 built for bench testing.
Salmson A9	9-cyl radial	1912	122 mm (4.803 in)	140 mm (5.512 in)	14.73 L (898.88 cu in)	82 kW (110 hp) – 96.94 kW (130 hp)	30 built – certified to 47 hours running by 1914
Salmson C9	9-cyl radial	1912	150 mm (5.906 in)	180 mm (7.087 in)	28.63 L (1,747.11 cu in)	223.7 kW (300 hp)	1 built for testing
Salmson M7	7-cyl radial	1913	122 mm (4.803 in)	140 mm (5.512 in)	11.5 L (701.77 cu in)	74.57 kW (100 hp) – 85.75 kW (115 hp)	50 built for bench testing.
Salmson 2M7	14-cyl 2-row radial	1913	122 mm (4.803 in)	140 mm (5.512 in)	23 L (1,403.55 cu in)	149.1 kW (200 hp) at 1300rpm	15 built in France 300 built in Great Britain. Powered the Kennedy Giant, Short Type 166, Sopwith Bat Boat II, Sopwith Type C, Sopwith Type 860 and Wight Navyplane.
Salmson 2A9	18 cyl 2-row radial	1913	122 mm (4.803 in)	140 mm (5.512 in)	29.46 L (1,797.76 cu in)	233.7 kW (313 hp) at 1500rpm	1 built for bench testing.
Salmson B9	9-cyl radial	1913	122 mm (4.803 in)	140 mm (5.512 in)	14.73 L (898.88 cu in)	104.4 kW (140 hp)	106 built in Great Britain, 300 built in France. Powered the Short Type 135, Short S.74 et Short Type 830 and Voisin LA 5
Salmson M9	9-cyl radial	1914	122 mm (4.803 in)	140 mm (5.512 in)	14.73 L (898.88 cu in)	89.48 kW (120 hp) – 96.94 kW (130 hp)	500 built in France. Powered the Voisin LA 3, Breguet U2, Blackburn Type L, Breguet 14 prototype.
Salmson P9	9-cyl radial	1915	122 mm (4.803 in)	140 mm (5.512 in)	14.73 L (898.88 cu in)	111.85 kW (150 hp)	300 built in France, 300 built in Russia. Powered the Voisin type LA 5 and Farman HF.27
Salmson R9	9-cyl radial	1915	125 mm (4.921 in)	140 mm (5.512 in)	15.46 L (943.43 cu in)	111.85 kW (150 hp) – 119.3 kW (160 hp) at 1300rpm	50 built in France, 300 built in Russia. Powered the Lebed 12, Anatra DS, and Salmson-Moineau (1917) prototype
Salmson 9Z	9-cyl radial	1917	125 mm (4.921 in)	170 mm (6.693 in)	18.7 L (1,141.14 cu in)	186.4 kW (250 hp) at 1400rpm	a.k.a. Z9 Water-cooled or Z9 – 3000 built in France, 56 built in Great Britain. Powered the Salmson 2A2, Latécoère 3, Farman 60, Voisin Triplane, Caudron C.23 and Vickers Vimy prototype
Salmson 9Za							Variant of the 9Z, powered the Hanriot HD.3
Salmson 9Zm							Variant of the 9Z
Salmson 9Zc							Variant of the 9Z
Salmson CM.9	9					194 kW (260 hp)	powered the Salmson 2 Berline
Salmson 18Z	18-cyl 2-row radial		125 mm (4.921 in)	170 mm (6.693 in)	37.4 L (2,282.29 cu in)	373 kW (500 hp) at 1,600 rpm	
Salmson 18Cm	18	1934	125 mm (4.921 in)	180 mm (7.087 in)	39.760 L (2,426.3 cu in)	410 kW (550 hp) at 1,700 rpm	2-row In-line radial water-cooled version of the 18Z / 18AB

== Specifications (Salmson 9Z) ==
Data from

=== General characteristics ===
- Type: 9-cyl radial engine
- Bore: 125 mm (4.921 in)
- Stroke: 170 mm (6.693 in)
- Displacement: 18.776 L (1,145.78 cu in)
- Dry weight: 214.5 kg (473 lb)
- Designer: Georges Marius Henri-Georges Canton and Pierre Unné

=== Components ===
- Cooling system: Water with radiators

=== Performance ===
- Power output: 186.4 kW (250 hp) at 1550rpm
- Compression ratio: 5.4:1

== See also ==
- Salmson air-cooled aero-engines
- List of aircraft engines

== References and further reading ==
- (in French) La société des moteurs Salmson at Hydro-Retro.Net
- Salmson Z-9 at the Aircraft Engine Historical Society
- Angelucci, Enzo (1983). The Rand McNally encyclopedia of military aircraft, 1914-1980. The Military Press. p. 103. ISBN 0-517-41021 4.
- Hirschauer, Louis; Dollfus, Charles, eds. (1921). L'Année Aéronautique: 1920-1921. Paris: Dunod. p. 131.
