= Wight Seaplane =

Seaplane
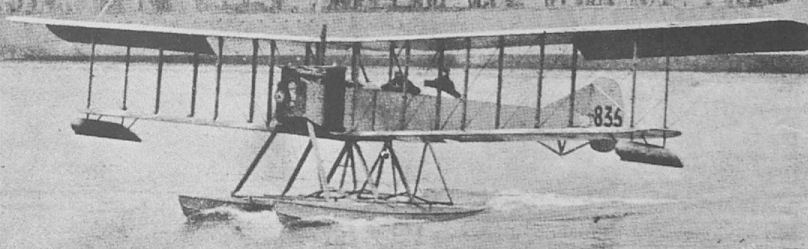
- Wight Type 840 on anti-submarine patrol 1915

General information
- Type: Biplane floatplane
- National origin: United Kingdom
- Manufacturer: J Samuel White & Company Limited (Wight Aircraft)
- Designer: Howard T Wight
- Primary user: Royal Navy
- Number built: 52

History
- Introduction date: 1915
- Retired: 1917

The Wight Seaplane was a British twin-float seaplane produced by J Samuel White & Company Limited (Wight Aircraft). It was also known as the Admiralty Type 840.

== Design and development ==
Designed by Howard T Wright and built by the aircraft department of the shipbuilding company J Samuel White & Company Limited, the Wight Seaplane was a slightly smaller version (61 ft (18.59 m) span) of the Wight Pusher Seaplane. The aircraft was a conventional two-float seaplane with tandem open cockpits and a nose-mounted 225 hp (168 kW) Sunbeam engine. Fifty-two aircraft were built and delivered, and an extra 20 were produced as spares production being undertaken by Portholme Aviation and William Beardmore & Co., Ltd.

== Operational history ==
The Wight Seaplane served with the RNAS at Dundee Felixstowe, Scapa Flow and Gibraltar, being used for anti-submarine patrols between 1915 and 1917.

== Operators ==
United Kingdom

- Royal Navy
  - Royal Naval Air Service

== Specifications (Seaplane) ==
Data from The British Bomber since 1914

General characteristics

- Crew: 2
- Length: 41 ft 0 in (12.50 m)
- Wingspan: 61 ft 0 in (18.59 m)
- Wing area: 568 sq ft (52.8 m^{2})
- Empty weight: 3,408 lb (1,546 kg)
- Gross weight: 4,810 lb (2,182 kg)
- Powerplant: 1 × Sunbeam 225hp V-8 water-cooled piston engine, 225 hp (168 kW)
- Propellers: 2-bladed fixed-pitch propeller

Performance

- Maximum speed: 81 mph (130 km/h, 70 kn)

Armament

- Bombs: 1x 810 lb (367 kg) Whitehead Mk.IX 14 in (356 mm) aerial torpedo or equivalent weight in bombs.

== See also ==
Related development

- Wight Pusher Seaplane
