= Latécoère 3 =

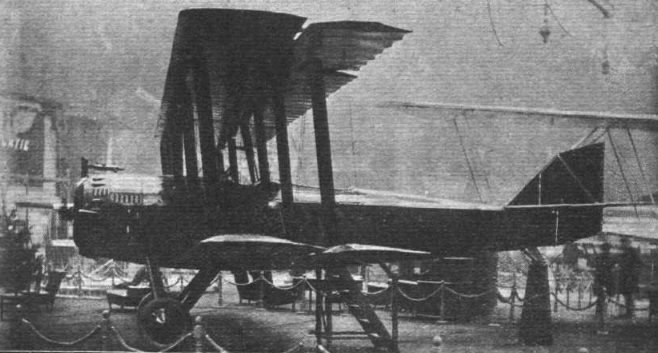

General information
- Type: Two seat prototype for small passenger transport/postal biplane
- National origin: France
- Manufacturer: Les Forges et Ateliers de constructions Latécoère
- Number built: 1

The Latécoère 3 was a French biplane transport; the 1919 prototype was a two-seater but the unbuilt production version would have carried two or three passengers as well as the pilot.

== Design and development ==
Immediately after the end of World War I, Pierre-Georges Latécoère began his career in aviation by building limousine versions of the Salmson 2 and of the more powerful Breguet 14, both French wartime two seat observation aircraft. The limousines replaced the open rear observer's cockpit with seats for two passengers, enclosed in a hump roofed, windowed cabin. They were known as the Limousine Salmson-Latécoère and the Limousine Breguet-Latécoère and both were used in numbers by the new Lignes aeriennes Latécoère.

By the end of 1919 Latécoère had built a new and original design, which appeared at the Paris Aéro Salon in December of that year. Like the Salmson 2, it was a two bay biplane with unstaggered, equal span, constant chord, fabric covered wings fitted with ailerons on both planes and powered by a water cooled Salmson (Canton-Unné) Z9 nine-cylinder radial engine. However, unlike the Salmson 2 the Latécoère had an entirely metal structure, as well as completely redesigned wings of 1.1 m (3 ft 7 in) greater (9%) span and with a 24% increase in wing area. The greater area gave an increase in load from 546 kg (1,200 lb) to 740 kg (1,630 lb) and an improved commercial load of 445 kg (980 lb); the low useful load of the Salmson 2 had been an important limitation. The Latécoère 3's vertical tail was angular, unlike that of the Salmson though similar to the Limousine Salmson-Latécoère. The intention was to provide the Latécoère 3 with a similar limousine type, two or three seat passenger cabin with space for post to be carried at the rear, though this was never built; the Salon machine had two open cockpits with the pilot in front, as on the unmodified Salsmon.

It is not known if the Latécoère 3 was flown but it did not enter production; the small market for small commercial aircraft at this time was dominated by the large numbers of ex-service aircraft available at low prices and the modified Breguet 14 was too cheap for the Latécoère to compete with.

== Specifications ==
Data from Latécoère Les avions et hydravions p.36

General characteristics

- Crew: Two
- Length: 8.25 m (27 ft 1 in)
- Wingspan: 12.85 m (42 ft 2 in) upper and lower wings
- Height: 3.40 m (11 ft 2 in)
- Wing area: 46.25 m^{2} (497.8 sq ft)
- Empty weight: 930 kg (2,050 lb)
- Gross weight: 1,670 kg (3,682 lb)
- Powerplant: 1 × Salmson (Canton-Unné) Z9 9 cylinder, water cooled radial, 190 kW (260 hp) , (260 ch)
- Propellers: 2-bladed wooden

Performance

- Maximum speed: 170 km/h (110 mph, 92 kn) at sea level, 159 km/h (99 mph; 86 kn) at 4,000 m (13,100 ft)
