= Sopwith Type 860 =

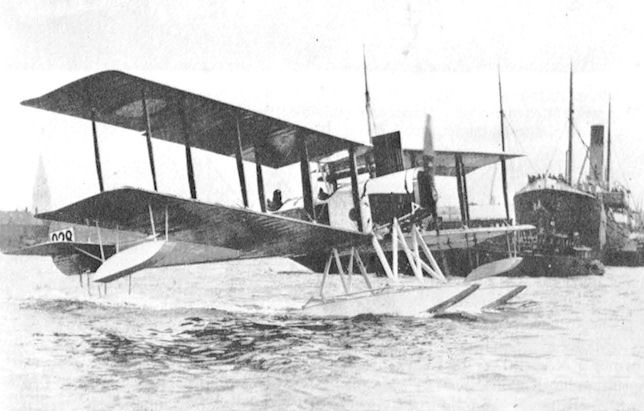
- Type 860 No.938 at Woolston, Southampton

General information
- Type: Torpedo bomber seaplane
- Manufacturer: Sopwith Aviation Company
- Primary user: Royal Naval Air Service
- Number built: 22

History
- Introduction date: 1915
- First flight: 1914
- Retired: 1916

The Sopwith Admiralty Type 860 was a 1910s British biplane seaplane torpedo bomber designed and built for the Admiralty by the Sopwith Aviation Company.

== Design and development ==
First flown in December 1914 the Type 860 was an unswept biplane. The upper wings had a strut braced extension and ailerons were fitted on all four wings. It had twin strut-mounted floats under the fuselage and a float mounted under the tail and each wingtip. Some models were powered by a nose-mounted 200 hp 14-cylinder engine; others used a 225 hp (168 kW) Sunbeam Mohawk engine. Both models utilised a two-bladed propeller. It had two tandem open cockpits and could carry one 810 lb (367 kg) torpedo under the fuselage. The Sopwith Admiralty Seaplane Type 860 was built in two versions. The standard version had wings of equal span; the second version had a lower wing of shorter span. In both versions, the wings were designed to fold. The type remained in service with RNAS until at least 1916.

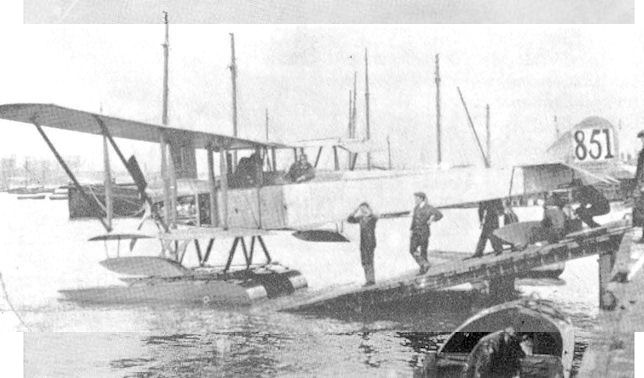
Type 860 No.851 with unequal span wings

== Operators ==
United Kingdom

- Royal Naval Air Service

== Specifications ==
General characteristics

- Crew: 2
- Wingspan: 62 ft 11 in (19.18 m)
- Wing area: 790 sq ft (73.4 m^{2})
- Powerplant: 1 × Salmson 2M7 water-cooled piston engine, 220 hp (160 kW) or 225 hp Sunbeam Mohawk
- Propellers: 2-bladed

Armament
1 x 810 lb (370 kg) 14 inch Whitehead Mk. IX aerial torpedo

== See also ==
Related lists

- List of aircraft of the Royal Naval Air Service
- List of flying boats and floatplanes
