= Blackburn Type L =

Type L
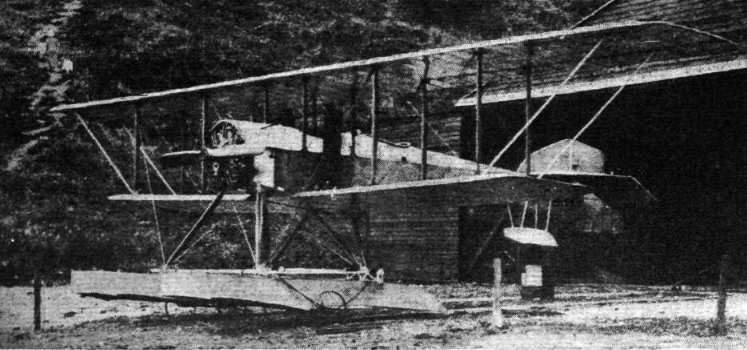

General information
- Type: racing seaplane
- National origin: United Kingdom
- Manufacturer: Blackburn Aeroplane and Motor Co Ltd
- Designer: Robert Blackburn
- Number built: 1

History
- First flight: 1914
- Retired: 1915

The Blackburn Type L was a single-engine, two-seat biplane built for the 1914 Daily Mail Circuit of Britain seaplane race of 1914.

== Development ==
All six of Robert Blackburn's previous aircraft had been monoplanes and had suffered no structural problems, but during 1912 in both the UK and in Europe there had been enough monoplane structural failures for the RFC to ban them from service. There was a move to biplanes which Blackburn followed. The Type L, his first biplane and a seaplane was built specifically as a candidate for the Circuit of Britain Race, sponsored by the Daily Mail with a £5,000 winner's prize.

Assembled at Blackburn's Olympia Works in Leeds (a former skating rink), the Type L was a two-seat tractor seaplane. It had two-bay wings without stagger, the upper plane having a span of 14 ft 6 in (4.4 m) greater than the lower, with outward-sloping struts connecting the two extremities. The upper plane carried long ailerons extending over 70% of the span. The wings and the square-section fuselage were wooden frames with fabric covering, although the fuselage decking was aluminium. The pilot's seat was just behind the wing trailing edge, with the second seat under the wing. Tail surfaces were conventional, apart from the rudder horn balance positioned under the rear end of the fuselage. The floats were attached to the fuselage with six ash struts and separated by a pair of parallel spreader-bars fore and aft. The hydrodynamics of floats was still evolving at the time, and those on the Type L were unusual in having a step close to the nose, followed by an arched, flat-bottomed underside aft to the second step. There was a small float under the tail.

Power was provided by a cowled 130 hp (100 kW) Salmson 9 nine-cylinder radial, licence built by Dudbridge Iron Works Ltd at Stroud. Most unusually for a radial, this type was water-cooled and needed two narrow radiators, one either side of the front seat. There were two fuel tanks in the fuselage.

== Operational history ==
The Circuit of Britain race was due to start from Calshot on 14 August 1914. There were nine competitors, who were on their way to the start when the First World War was declared on 4 August. All the aircraft were impounded by the Admiralty.

The Type L was based at Scalby Mills just north of Scarborough on the English north-east coast, an area attacked during 1914 by the German Navy. Here it was used for offshore reconnaissance. During this time, some modifications were made to it, aimed at cooling and control problems: the engine cowling was removed and the long-span ailerons replaced with much shorter surfaces near the wingtips, protruding well behind the wing trailing edges. A wider-chord propeller was also added. At some point, it carried a .303 in (7.7 mm) machine gun, before being lost in a crash on the cliff top at Speeton early in 1915.

== Specifications ==
Data from Jackson 1968, pp. 93

General characteristics

- Crew: two
- Length: 32 ft 6 in (9.91 m)
- Wingspan: 49 ft 6 in (15.08 m)
- Height: 12 ft 6 in (3.81 m)
- Wing area: 481 sq ft (44.7 m^{2})
- Empty weight: 1,717 lb (779 kg)
- Gross weight: 2,475 lb (1,123 kg)
- Powerplant: 1 × Salmson-Canton-Unné 9-cylinder water-cooled radial. Power at 1,250 rpm , 130 hp (97 kW)

Performance

- Maximum speed: 81 mph (130 km/h, 70 kn)
- Range: 445 mi (715 km, 387 nmi)
- Service ceiling: 1,100 ft (3,350 m)
- Rate of climb: 147 ft/min (0.75 m/s) to 5000ft (1,525 m)
