= Hanriot H.25 =

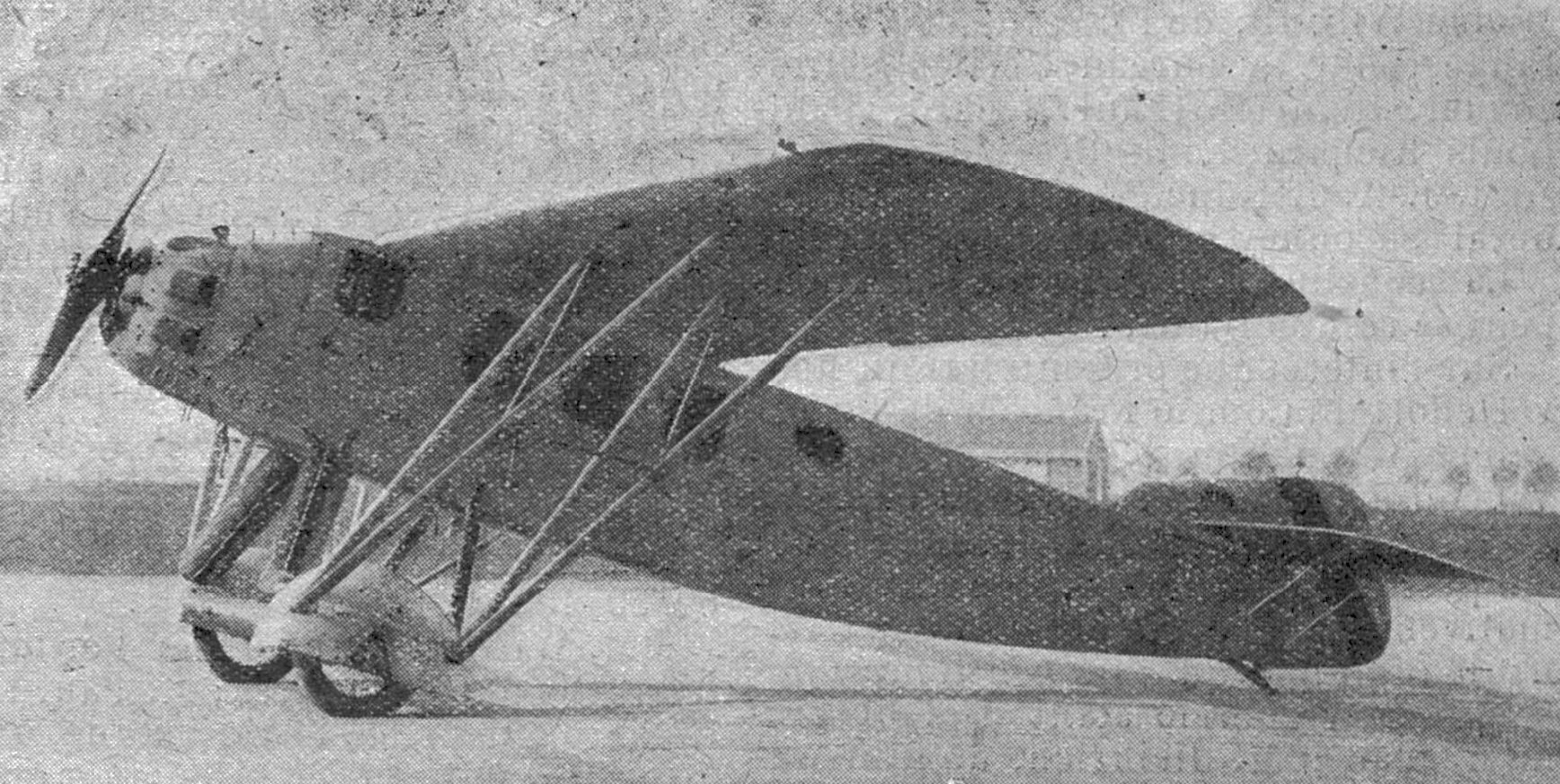

General information
- Type: Six passenger airliner
- National origin: France
- Manufacturer: Aéroplanes Hanriot et Cie
- Number built: 1

History
- First flight: Early 1926

The Hanriot H.25 was a French, single-engined, six passenger airliner built in 1926. Only one was flown.

== Design and development ==
The Hanriot H.25 was a braced, high wing monoplane. It had an all-metal structure, covered everywhere with fabric. Its wing was built in three parts, a central section fixed to the upper fuselage longerons and a pair of outer panels which were braced on each side by two sets of parallel paired, interconnected struts which ran from two well-separated positions on the wing spars to meet on the undercarriage structure. The wing was essentially rectangular in plan apart from slightly angled tops and had constant thickness. Narrow-chord ailerons filled well over half the trailing edge.

It was powered by a 370 kW (500 hp), eighteen cylinder Salmson 18 Cm. This was one of the last, and the most powerful, of Salmson's water-cooled radial engines, with two in-line rows of nine cylinders. It was enclosed in a rounded cowling with caps over the cylinder-heads. Fuel was held in the wing centre-section and two Lamblin radiators were mounted on the undercarriage legs. Behind the engine the fuselage was rectangular in section, defined by light-metal, U-section longerons and cross-frames. The open cockpit was at the wing leading edge, with small side-windows for a better view downwards. Behind the cockpit the cabin seated six passengers, each with their own window. Entry was via a port-side door and there was a disposable emergency ceiling hatch to allow passengers to escape by parachute.

The horizontal tail was mounted on top of the fuselage, braced from the lower fuselage longerons on each side with a pair of parallel struts. Its plan was similar to the wing and the elevators were split, with a cut-out for the deep, broad rudder. The tailplane angle of incidence could be trimmed in flight. The low area fin was broad but unusually low; its angle of incidence could only be adjusted on the ground. The H.28 had conventional, fixed, tailskid landing gear. Its mainwheels, half enclosed by individual semi-circular fairings, were on a single axle and rubber cord shock absorbers enclosed within a streamlined fairing mounted on the lower fuselage longerons by N-form struts and reinforced by the wing bracing struts. The undercarriage track was 3 m (9 ft 10 in).

The date of the H.28's first flight is not known but by mid-May 1926 its development programme was underway at Villacoublay. No more independent reports on the type appear in the French journals and there is no evidence of a second example.

== Specifications ==
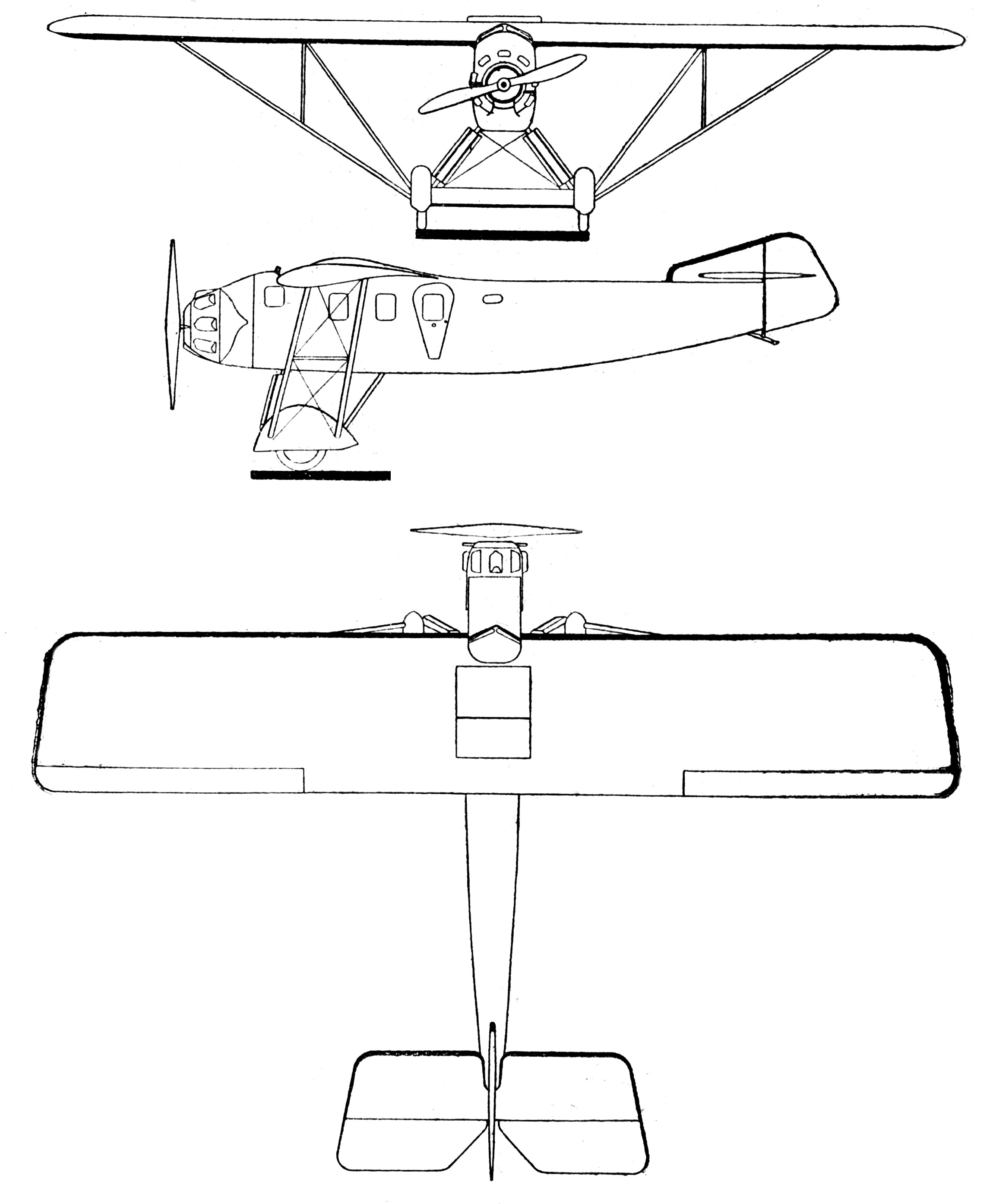
Hanriot H.25 3-view drawing from Les Ailes May 26, 1926

Data from Les Ailes, May 1926

General characteristics

- Crew: one
- Capacity: six passengers
- Length: 12.50 m (41 ft 0 in)
- Wingspan: 17.0 m (55 ft 9 in)
- Height: 3.80 m (12 ft 6 in)
- Wing area: 51 m^{2} (550 sq ft)
- Empty weight: 1,700 kg (3,748 lb)
- Gross weight: 2,600 kg (5,732 lb)
- Fuel capacity: Fuel and oil 300 kg (660 lb)
- Powerplant: 1 × Salmson 18 Cm water-cooled, two row inline radial, 370 kW (500 hp)
- Propellers: 2-bladed

Performance

- Maximum speed: 195 km/h (121 mph, 105 kn) at ground level
- Service ceiling: 4,000 m (13,000 ft)
