= Kennedy Giant =

Giant
- The prototype aircraft

General information
- Type: Heavy bomber
- Manufacturer: Fairey Aviation, Gramophone Company
- Designer: McKenzie-Kennedy
- Primary user: Royal Flying Corps
- Number built: 1

History
- First flight: "hopped" 1917

The Kennedy Giant was a British biplane heavy bomber designed by Kennedy Aeroplanes Ltd. during the First World War. The design was an imitation of works by Igor Sikorsky, with whom the owner of Kennedy Aeroplanes Ltd., C. J. H. Mackenzie-Kennedy, had ostensibly worked prior to setting up the company. The aeroplane was a notorious failure; its size meant that construction had to take place in an open field as none of the hangars near Hayes, Middlesex, where the prototype was assembled, were large enough to house it. For its weight, the aircraft's four engines were inadequate, and the resulting under-powered aircraft could only fly in a straight line once airborne.

Following the unimpressive test flight, the design was cancelled and the prototype was left derelict at Northolt Aerodrome for a number of years.

== Specifications ==
Data from

General characteristics

- Length: 80 ft (24 m)
- Wingspan: 142 ft (43 m)
- Empty weight: 19,000 lb (8,618 kg)
- Powerplant: 4 × Salmson 2M.7 14-cyl. two-row water-cooled radial engines, 200 hp (150 kW) each

Performance

== See also ==
- Sikorsky Ilya Muromets
- Slesarev Svyatogor
