= Dudbridge Iron Works =

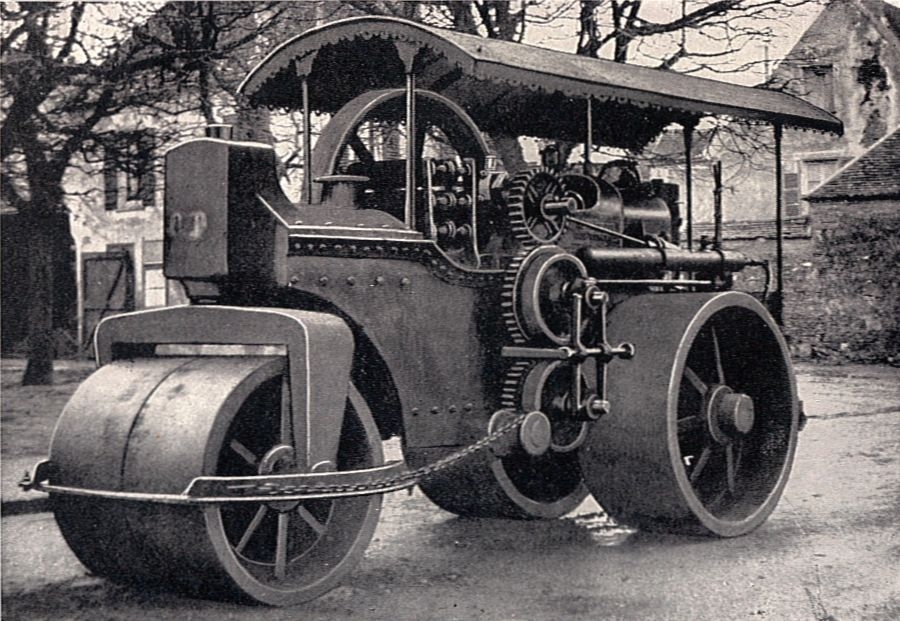
Road roller powered by a Dudbridge oil engine

The Dudbridge Iron Works Limited of Stroud, Gloucestershire, England was a reciprocating engine manufacturer including Salmson water-cooled aero-engines under licence from Salmson in France from 1914 to 1918.

== Bibliography ==
Bullock, Arthur (2009). Gloucestershire Between the Wars: A Memoir. The History Press. ISBN 978-0-7524-4793-3. (Page 168)
