= 1914 in aviation =

This is a list of aviation-related events from 1914.

The outbreak of World War I accelerates all aspects of aviation which in turn changes war in a twofold way. The aeroplane turns the sky into a new battlefield and eliminates the distinction between frontline and hinterland, with the civilian population far behind the frontline also becoming a target. The war results in the deaths of approximately 20,000 flyers, most of them trained pilots.

== Events ==
- The Austro-Hungarian Navy formally creates an air arm.
- Fiat establishes its Società Italiana Aviazione subsidiary, beginning its involvement in the manufacture of aircraft.
- The Yokosuka Naval Arsenal begins to produce seaplanes, the first manufacture of naval aircraft in Japan.
- The Aeromarine Plane and Motor Company is founded in Keyport, New Jersey, with Inglis M. Uppercu as president.

=== January ===
- 1 January
  - The Naval Wing of the Royal Flying Corps is given the responsibility for the operation of all British military airships. The Royal Navy retained control of all British airships until December 1919.
  - The St. Petersburg-Tampa Airboat Line starts services between St. Petersburg and Tampa, Florida, becoming the first airline to provide regular services with heavier-than-air aircraft, with Anthony Jannus conveying passengers in a Benoist XIV flying boat. A.C. Pheil is the first airline passenger.
- 2 January – Riding as a passenger in an airplane piloted by the British aviator Gustav Hamel, Trehawke Davies becomes the first woman to experience an aerobatic loop.

=== February ===
- The Sikorsky Ilya Muromets sets a load-to-altitude record, lifting 16 people to 2,000 metres (6,600 feet).
- 1 February – The Aero Club of America announces plans to sponsor an around-the-world airplane race.
- 3 February – German aviator Bruno Langer sets a new flight endurance record, flying nonstop for 14 hours 7 minutes.
- 7 February – Karl Ingold sets a new world flight endurance record, flying nonstop for 16 hours 20 minutes in an Aviatik biplane. The flight, from Mulhouse to Munich, Germany, covers a distance of 1,700 km (1,100 mi).
- 8–10 February – Berliner, Haase and Nikolai fly 3,053 km (1,896 statute miles) in their free balloon from Bitterfeld to Perm. This record stands until 1950.
- 11 February – Flying an LFG Roland Pfeilflieger biplane, German aviator Bruno Langer attempts to break the flight endurance record Karl Ingold set on 7 February, but falls 20 minutes short, landing at Kreuz after 16 continuous hours in the air.

=== March ===
- 1 March – Pioneer of Argentine aviation Jorge Newbery (b. 1875) is killed in a crash at Estancia "Los Tamarindos" while performing aerobatics prior to an attempt to cross the Andes by air.

=== April ===
- 20 April
  - Howard Pixton wins the Schneider Trophy at Monaco. Pixton averages 139.66 km/h (86.78 mph) over the course in a Sopwith Schneider.
  - Three U.S. Navy aircraft depart Pensacola, Florida on board the battleship USS Mississippi to take part in American military operations at Veracruz, Mexico. They will fly reconnaissance missions until 12 May.
- 25 April – The first combat flight by a U.S. Navy aircraft takes place. It is a flight to observe Mexican positions during the Veracruz Incident.

=== May ===
- The Royal Navy purchases an unfinished merchant ship for a complete redesign as the United Kingdom's first ship designed specifically for aviation activities. She will become the seaplane carrier Ark Royal.
- 8 May – A civilian pilot, René Caudron, makes the first French shipboard takeoff in an airplane from a ramp constructed over the foredeck of the seaplane carrier Foudre, using a Caudron G.3 amphibian floatplane.
- 19 May – Performing aerobatics in a Morane-Saulnier monoplane over the hippodrome at Riga in the Russian Empire, Russian pilot Lydia Zvereva becomes the first woman to execute a loop.
- 23 May – German-born British aviator Gustav Hamel disappears aged 24 over the English Channel while returning from Villacoublay in a new 80 hp Gnome Monosoupape engined Morane-Saulnier monoplane he has just collected, and intended to compete with in the Aerial Derby the same day (postponed).

=== June ===
- 6 June – The third annual Aerial Derby – postponed from 23 May due to poor weather – is held, sponsored by the Daily Mail. Eleven participants fly over a 94-mile (151-kilometer) circuit beginning and ending at Hendon Aerodrome in London with control points at Kempton Park, Esher, Purley, and Purfleet. Walter Brock is the overall winner for the second consecutive year, completing the course in 1 hour 18 minutes 54 seconds in a Morane-Saulnier G with a handicap of 20 minutes 24 seconds. The outbreak of World War I during the summer will prevent the event from being held again until 1919.
- 8–9 June – Flying a Morane-Saulnier monoplane, Eugène Gilbert departs Villacoublay and flies via Peronne, Rheims, Saint-Dizier, Gray, Joigny, Beaune, Vienne, and Nimes to Mirande, where he lands short of his goal of reaching Pau due to fuel exhaustion. He continues on 9 June, taking off from Mirande and flying via Pau, Saint-André-de-Cubzac, Romorantin, Angers, Evreux, and Calais to Villacoublay, where he lands having covered a distance over two days of 2,970 km (1,845 mi) in 39 hours 35 minutes. The flight will win him the 1914 International Michelin Cup for the fastest time of the year over a circuit of about 3,000 km (1,864 mi). It is the last International Michelin Cup awarded until 1921.
- 9 June – Using a ramp constructed over the foredeck of the seaplane carrier Foudre, French Navy Lieutenant de vaisseau (Ship-of-the-Line Lieutenant) Jean de Laborde attempts France's second airplane takeoff from a ship and the first by a French naval aviator, but crashes.
- 20 June – While the Austro-Hungarian airship Militärluftschiff III (or M.III) hovers over Fischamend testing new camera equipment, an Austro-Hungarian Army pilot tries to loop M.III in a Farman biplane. The airplane strikes the top of the airship, tearing a hole and igniting the escaping hydrogen gas. Both aircraft are destroyed, and both men in the airplane and all seven men aboard M.III are killed. It is the end of the Austro-Hungarian airship program.
- 23 June – The first flight of the flying boat America, which businessman Rodman Wanamaker has ordered with a goal of sponsoring the first transatlantic flight, occurs at Hammondsport, New York. The outbreak of World War I five weeks later will prevent the transatlantic attempt from taking place.
- 24 June – At Johannistal, Germany, German aviator Gustav Basser sets a new flight endurance record, flying nonstop for 18 hours 10 minutes.
- 25 June – After his first attempt of the day to fly over 14,505-foot (4,421-meter) Mount Whitney in the Sierra Nevada range in California fails due to strong winds, Silas Christofferson succeeds in his second attempt, setting a U.S. altitude record of 15,728 feet (4,794 metres)
- 30 June – A Sikorsky Ilya Muromets airplane takes off from Saint Petersburg for Kiev for its first long-range test flight, a world record with a distance of some 1,200 km (750 mi) and just one fuel stop.

=== July ===
- 1 July
  - The Naval Wing of the British Royal Flying Corps is separated from the RFC and established as a separate service, the Royal Naval Air Service, under the control of the Royal Navy.
  - The United States Navy establishes its first air department, the Bureau of Aeronautics.
- 6 July – The French aviation pioneer Georges Legagneux is killed while flying over Saumur, France, when he enters a dive, never pulls out of it, and plunges into the Loire.
- 10–11 July – German Reinhold Böhm flies his Albatros-biplane 24 hours and 12 minutes without refueling and nonstop. This one-man-flight record lasts until 1927.
- 11 July – London–Paris return air race won by the American Walter L. Brock.
- 18 July – The United States Congress creates an Aviation Section in the United States Army Signal Corps.
- 22 July – The Austro-Hungarian Navy battleships Erzherzog Franz Ferdinand, Radetzky, and SMS Zrínyi each transport one flying boat from Pola to the Gulf of Cattaro. The following day they carry out a reconnaissance of the border with Montenegro. These are the first operational flights in Europe by naval aircraft.
- 28 July
  - World War I begins as Austria-Hungary declares war on Serbia, following the assassination of Archduke Franz Ferdinand a month earlier.
  - Royal Naval Air Service Squadron Commander Arthur M. Longmore successfully releases a 14-inch (356-mm) torpedo from a Short Admiralty Type 81 floatplane. This may be the first successful aerial launch of a torpedo, although Captain Alessandro Guidoni of Italy's drop of a dummy torpedo from the experimental Pateras Pescara monoplane in "mid-1914" may have been earlier.
- 30 July – Flying the Blériot XI-2 monoplane Ca Flotte, Norwegian aviator Tryggve Gran makes the first crossing of the North Sea by aeroplane, flying 465 km (289 mi) from Cruden Bay, Scotland, to Jæren, Norway, in 4 hours 10 minutes.
- Unknown date – Republic of China uses airplanes to bomb targets in the Bai Lang Rebellion.

=== August ===
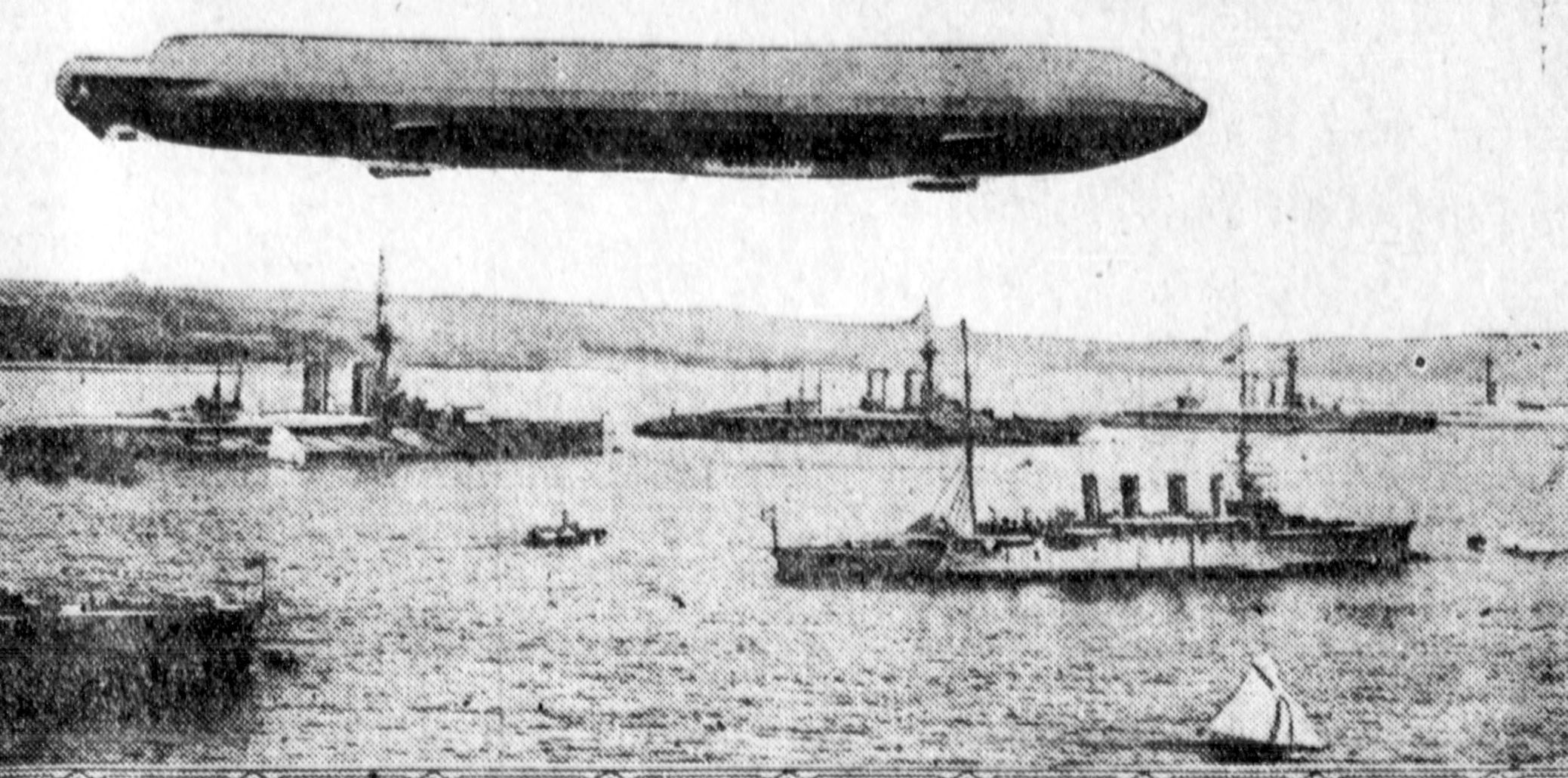
A German dirigible hovering over a British fleet.

- French military aviators "attempted to destroy buildings near Wesel; others have been seen in the district of the Eifel; one has thrown bombs on the railway near Carlsruhe and Nuremberg."
- Imperial German Navy Rear Admiral Paul Behncke, Chief of the Naval Staff, urges that the navy's Zeppelins begin attacks on London, arguing that Zeppelin attacks "may be expected, whether they involve London or the neighborhood of London, to cause panic in the population which may possibly render it doubtful that the war may be continued."
- As World War I breaks out, neutral Italy has 28 combat-ready aircraft and 18 military aircraft in reserve. Italy will join the war on the side of the Allies in May 1915.
- 1 August – The Russian Empire enters World War I with Russia's declaration of war on Austria-Hungary.
- 3 August
  - France and Belgium enter World War I when Germany invades Belgium and declares war on France.
  - The Imperial German Navy leases the cargo-passenger ship Answald for conversion into Germany's first seaplane carrier, SMS Answald, designated Flugzeugmutterschiff I (Airplane Mothership I).
- 4 August – The United Kingdom enters World War I, declaring war on Germany. At the time, the Royal Naval Air Service has 52 seaplanes, of which only 26 are serviceable, with 46 more on order.
- 5 August – The Netherlands decrees that all Dutch military aircraft display an orange disc on each side of the fuselage and on the upper and lower surfaces of the wings.
- 6 August – The first airship lost in combat is the Imperial German Army Zeppelin Z VI. Badly damaged by artillery and infantry gunfire on her first combat mission while bombing Liège, Belgium, at low altitude, she limps back into Germany and is wrecked in a crash-landing in a forest near Bonn.
- 8 August – A French aerial observer is injured by small-arms fire, becoming that nation's first air casualty in a war.
- 9–10 August – Conducting a reconnaissance mission, the French dirigible Fleurus becomes the first Allied aircraft to fly over Germany during World War I.
- 12 August – Lieutenant Robin R. Skene and mechanic R. Barlow crash their Blériot monoplane on the way to Dover, becoming the first members of the Royal Flying Corps to die on active duty.
- 13 August – Twelve Royal Aircraft Factory B.E.2 observation aircraft from No. 2 Squadron, Royal Flying Corps, flying from Dover, become the first British aircraft to arrive in France for the war.
- 14 August – The first true bomber, the French Voisin III, is used in combat for the first time in an attack on German airship hangars at Metz-Frascaty, Germany.
- 17 August – The Imperial Japanese Navy's first aviation ship, Wakamiya, is recommissioned as a seaplane carrier.
- 21 August – Two Imperial Germany Army Zeppelins on their first combat missions become the second and third airships lost in combat after being damaged by French infantry and artillery fire during low-altitude missions in the Vosges mountains. Z VII limps back into Germany to crash near St. Quirin in Lothringen, while Z VIII crash-lands in Badonvillers Forest near Badonvillers, France, where French cavalry drives off her crew and loots her. The loss of three airships on their first combat missions in August sours the German Army on the further combat use of airships.
- 22 August
  - An Avro 504 of the Royal Flying Corps's No. 5 Squadron on patrol over Belgium is shot down by German rifle fire, the first British aircraft ever to be destroyed in action.
  - An early attempt to get a Lewis gun into action in air-to-air combat fails when a Royal Flying Corps Farman armed with one scrambles to intercept a German Albatros and takes 30 minutes to climb to 1,000 feet (300 meters) because of the gun's weight. On landing, the pilot is ordered to remove the Lewis gun and carry a rifle on future missions.
- 23 August – Japan enters World War I, declaring war on Germany.
- 25 August – Flying a Morane-Saulnier Type G monoplane, Imperial Russian Army pilot Pyotr N. Nesterov becomes the first pilot to down an enemy aircraft in aerial combat. After firing unsuccessfully with a pistol at an Austro-Hungarian Albatros B.II crewed by Franz Malina (pilot) and Baron Friederich von Rosenthal (observer), Nesterov rams the Albatros. Both aircraft crash, killing all three men.
- 27 August – The Royal Naval Air Service's famed Eastchurch Squadron arrives in France for World War I service, commanded by Wing Commander Charles Samson.
- 30 August – Paris is bombed by a German aircraft for the first time – by an Etrich Taube flown by Lt Ferdinand von Hiddessen.

=== September ===
- Early September – In a memorandum, First Sea Lord Winston Churchill establishes the policy for the air defense of the United Kingdom. He calls for the use of antiaircraft artillery and searchlights around likely targets; the deployment of aircraft forward in Europe to attack all Zeppelin and other enemy air bases within reach; the interception of enemy aircraft between Dover and London by British aircraft, coordinated by telephone and telegraph; the basing of aircraft at Hendon specifically for the defense of London, with their crews specifically trained and equipped for night-fighting and their operations also coordinated by telephone; a blackout in major cities; and warning the public of the dangers of air attack, precautions against it, and how to take shelter when under air attack.
- 1 September – The Imperial Japanese Navy seaplane carrier Wakamiya arrives off Kiaochow Bay, China, to participate in operations during the siege of Qingdao. It is the first combat deployment of an aviation ship by any country.
- 5 September – During the siege of Qingdao, the Imperial Japanese Navy carries out its first air combat mission. A three-seat Farman seaplane from the Wakamiya bombs German fortifications at Qingdao, China, and conducts a reconnaissance of Kiaochow Bay.
- 16 September
  - The Canadian Aviation Corps is formed.
  - American aviation pioneer Weldon B. Cooke dies in a plane crash at Pueblo, Colorado.
- 22 September – In the first British air raid against Germany in history, Royal Naval Air Service BE.2 aircraft of No. 3 Squadron based at Antwerp, Belgium, attack German airship hangars at Cologne and Düsseldorf, Germany, but fail to inflict damage due to bad weather and the failure of bombs to explode.
- 23 September – In France the British No. 2 Anti Aircraft Section Royal Garrison Artillery, in III Corps, commanded by Lieutenant O.F.J. Hogg became the first anti-aircraft unit to shoot down an aircraft, by firing 75 rounds from a QF 1 pdr Mark II ("pom-pom").
- 27 September – The first French bomber group is formed.
- 28 September – The first report by British observers of German military aircraft using the initial form of the wartime Eisernes Kreuz national markings.
- 30 September –
  - The Wakamiya is damaged by a naval mine and forced to retire from the siege of Qingdao, ending the first combat deployment of an aviation ship in history.
  - The two America prototypes prepared for the Daily Mail sponsored transatlantic contest in August are shipped to the United Kingdom aboard RMS Mauretania for the Royal Naval Air Service, spawning a fleet of aircraft which saw extensive military service during World War I, developed extensively in the process for anti-submarine patrol craft and air-sea rescue.

=== October ===
- The Imperial Japanese Navy auxiliary cruiser Chikezen Maru carries two floatplanes during an unsuccessful search for the Imperial German Navy armed merchant raider Wolf in the Indian Ocean.
- 5 October – Sergeant Joseph Frantz and Corporal Louis Quenault of the French Escadrille VB24 are the first aviators in history to shoot down another aircraft with gunfire, downing a German Aviatik B.II with machine gun fire from their Voisin III over Jonchery, Reims.
- 8 October – In a raid planned by Royal Naval Air Service Wing Commander Charles Samson, two RNAS Sopwith Tabloids set out to attack the Zeppelin sheds at Düsseldorf. One of the aircraft attacks the Cologne railway station instead, but the other, piloted by Flight Lieutenant Reggie Marix, finds his target and destroys a shed holding the Imperial German Army Zeppelin Z IX (or LZ25) as well as Z IX itself. It is the first time that an airplane destroys a dirigible.
- 13 October – The Imperial Japanese Navy attempts air-to-air combat for the first time, as a naval airplane joins three Imperial Japanese Army airplanes in an attempt to attack a German reconnaissance plane during the siege of Qingdao. The German aircraft escapes.
- 26 October – The British Admiralty issues instructions to paint the Union Jack on the underside of the wings on Royal Naval Air Service aircraft.

=== November ===
- The first Imperial German Navy shipboard air operations take place, when the armored cruiser SMS Friedrich Carl embarks two seaplanes with which to scout Russian ports in the Baltic Sea. One is still aboard when Friedrich Carl strikes a mine and sinks on 17 November.
- 1 November – The Ottoman Empire enters World War I when Russia declares war on it.
- 6 November – Aviator Gunther Plüschow is ordered to evacuate the Kiautschou Bay Leased Territory in China using his sole aircraft, a Taube, which however crashes, leaving him to make his own way back to Germany.
- 18 November – The Secretary of State for the German Navy, Admiral Alfred von Tirpitz, advocating massed Zeppelin attacks on London, writes, "The English are now in terror of the Zeppelin, perhaps not without reason...[S]ingle bombs from flying machines are wrong; they are odious when they hit and kill old women, and one gets used to them. If [however] one could set fire to London in thirty places, then what in a small way is odious would retire before something fine and powerful."
- 21 November – Three Royal Naval Air Service Avro 504s based at Belfort, France, conduct history's first long-range strategic bombing raid, attacking German airship sheds on the shore of Lake Constance at Friederichshafen. Carrying four 20-pound (9.1 kg) bombs each, they cause a gas works to explode and badly damage a dirigible, losing one aircraft shot down.
- 27 November – The first air–sea battle in history occurs when Imperial Japanese Navy Farman seaplanes make an unsuccessful attempt to bomb German and Austro-Hungarian ships in Jiaozhou Bay during the siege of Qingdao.

=== December ===
- Upon the conclusion of the siege of Qingdao, Wakamiya returns Japanese naval seaplanes deployed at Qingdao to Japan. The Japanese naval air arm sees no further combat during World War I.
- 10 December – HMS Ark Royal is completed. She is the first ship with an internal hangar enclosed by her hull, and the first with specially designed internal spaces to accommodate aviation fuel, lubricants, ordnance, and spares and machinery required for aircraft maintenance.
- 14 December – A Royal Naval Air Service Avro 504 of the Eastchurch Squadron drops four 16-pound (7.3 kg) bombs on the Ostend-Bruges railway in Belgium.
- 16 December – SMS Glyndwr is the first Imperial German Navy aviation ship to be commissioned. She serves initially as a seaplane pilot training ship.
- 21 December
  - The United Kingdom is bombed by a German aircraft for the first time, when an Etrich Taube drops two bombs near the Admiralty Pier, Kent.
  - Flying a Maurice Farman biplane, Royal Naval Air Service Wing Commander Charles R. Samson conducts history's first night bombing raid, attacking Ostend, Belgium.
- 25 December – HMS Empress, HMS Engadine, and HMS Riviera launch a seaplane attack on the Zeppelin sheds at Nordholz Airbase. It is the first attempt in history to exert sea power on land by means of the air. Fog prevents the aircraft from reaching their target, and only three of the nine aircraft find their way back to their mother ships.

== First flights ==
- Aviatik B.I
- Caudron Type J Marine
- Nieuport 10
- January or February – Caudron Type O

=== January ===
- Sikorsky Ilya Muromets

=== February ===
- 23 February − Bristol Scout

=== June ===
- 23 June − America flying boat

=== July ===
- Avro 510
- Avro 514
- Vickers F.B.5 Gunbus

== Entered service ==
- Aviatik B.I with the Imperial German Flying Corps

== Retirements ==
=== May ===
- Avro Type D
