= Short Admiralty Type 74 =

Admiralty Type 74

General information
- Type: Military reconnaissance biplane seaplane
- Manufacturer: Short Brothers
- Designer: Horace Short
- Primary user: Royal Navy
- Number built: 7

History
- Manufactured: Eastchurch
- Introduction date: 1914
- First flight: 4 January 1914
- Developed from: Short Admiralty Type 42

The Short Admiralty Type 74 was a single-engined biplane tractor seaplane with non-folding wings, which saw service with the Royal Naval Air Service during the First World War.

== Design and development ==
The Type 74 incorporated some of the innovations Horace Short had introduced to the Short Admiralty Type 42, including manganese-steel tube struts instead of wood. In addition to the two main rubber-sprung floats below the fuselage and the single tail float, it also had smaller floats attached below the lower wingtips. Ailerons were mounted on the upper wing only, the latter extending beyond the span of the lower wing. The extensions were braced by diagonal struts to the lower wingtips.

Since it was intended for use as a coastal patrol seaplane operating from coastal stations, there was no requirement for the Type 74 to have folding wings.

The Type 74 was powered by a 100 hp (74.6 kW) Gnome double Omega engine, which provided a maximum flight duration of five hours.

== Operational history ==
In 1913 the Royal Navy ordered seven 100 hp biplane seaplanes from Shorts, which were assigned the company's serial numbers 69-75. The first of these flew on 4 January 1914, piloted by Gordon Bell, Chief Test Pilot at Shorts. He was accompanied on this first flight by Charles Richard Fairey (later Sir Richard Fairey), who left Shorts in 1915 to found the Fairey Aviation company. When this first aircraft was delivered to the Royal Navy air station on the Isle of Grain it received the Navy's serial number 74, so this and the remaining six aircraft from the batch (Navy numbers 74-80) were therefore known as the Admiralty Type 74 according to the rules in use at the time.

Of the seven aircraft, four (including Naval nos. 75 and 79) were dispatched to the air station at Dundee, the other three remaining at the Grain air station. The Dundee aircraft took part in the 1914 Royal Fleet Review off Spithead as part of a contingent of 17 seaplanes and four airships.

== Operators ==
United Kingdom

- Royal Naval Air Service

== Specifications ==
Data from Shorts Aircraft since 1900

General characteristics

- Crew: 2
- Length: 39 ft 0 in (11.89 m)
- Wingspan: 57 ft 0 in (17.37 m)
- Wing area: 580 sq ft (54 m^{2})
- Empty weight: 2,100 lb (953 kg)
- Gross weight: 2,700 lb (1,225 kg)
- Powerplant: 1 × Gnome Monosoupape 9 Type B-2 9-cylinder air-cooled rotary piston engine, 100 hp (75 kW)
- Propellers: 2-bladed fixed-pitch propeller

Performance

- Maximum speed: 65 mph (105 km/h, 56 kn)
- Endurance: 5 hours
