= Short Admiralty Type 166 =

Type 166
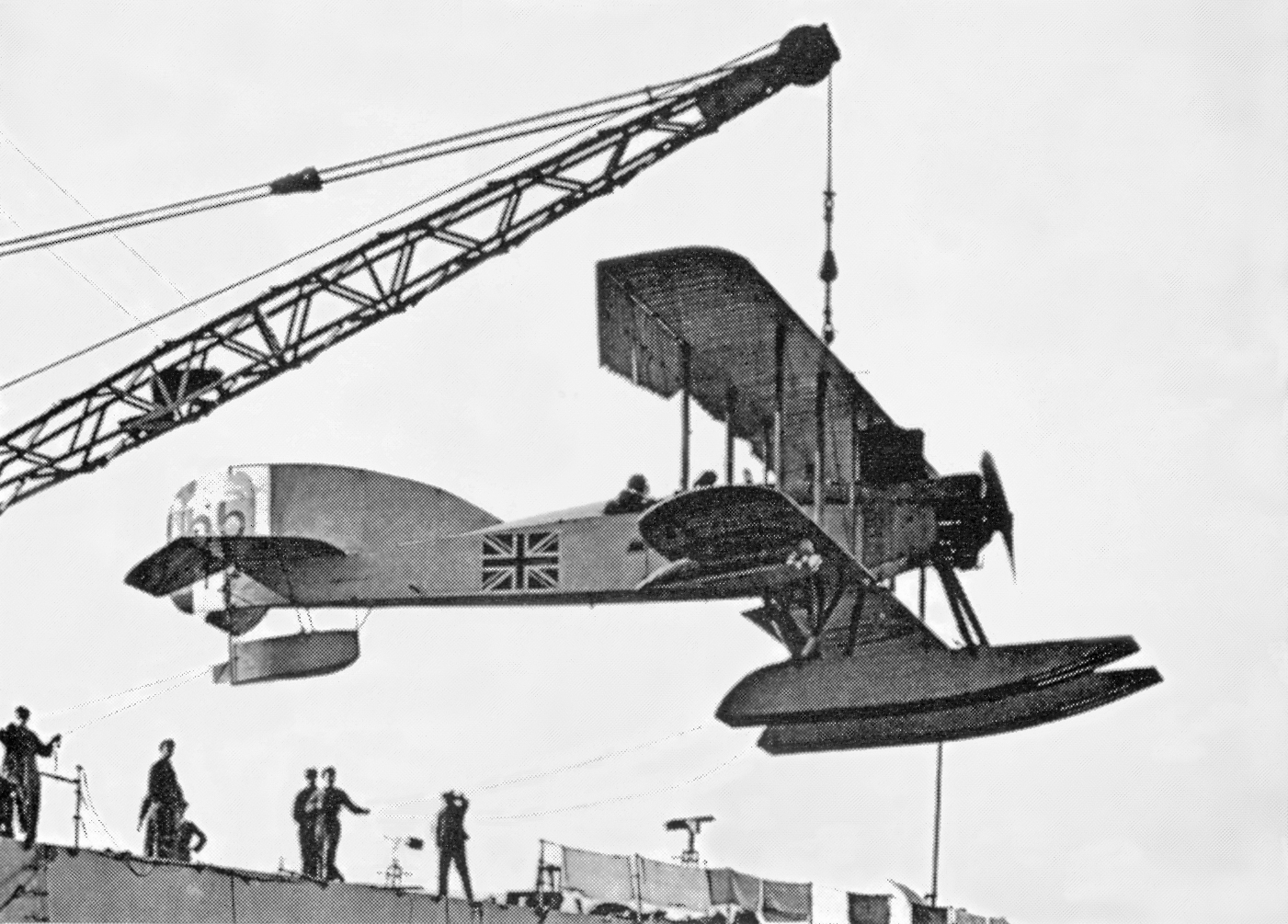
- Short Admiralty Type 166 on HMS Ark Royal, 1916.

General information
- Type: Torpedo-bomber and reconnaissance floatplane
- National origin: United Kingdom
- Manufacturer: Short Brothers
- Primary user: Royal Naval Air Service
- Number built: 26

History
- First flight: 1916

The Short Type 166 was a 1910s British two-seat reconnaissance, bombing and torpedo-carrying folder seaplane, designed by Short Brothers.

== Development ==
The Short Type 166 was designed as a 'folder' aircraft to operate from the Ark Royal as a torpedo-bomber. Six aircraft, known within Shorts as the Type A, were originally ordered before the outbreak of World War I, and were assigned the Admiralty serial numbers 161 to 166. As was normal at the time, the type was designated the Admiralty Type 166, after the naval serial number of the last aircraft in the batch. Sometimes, the aircraft are referred to as the Short S.90 (S.90 was the manufacturer's serial number of the first aircraft, naval serial 161).

The Type 166 was similar to the earlier Short Type 136, but slightly larger, and was designed from the start as a torpedo carrier, although it was never used in that rôle.

== Design ==
The Type 166 was a two-bay biplane with twin wooden pontoon floats, with a water rudder fitted to the tail float, plus a stabilizing float mounted near the wingtip under each lower wing. It was powered by a nose-mounted 200 hp (149 kW) Salmson engine.

A follow-on order for 20 aircraft was assembled by Westland Aircraft at its Yeovil factory. The Westland-built aircraft did not have provision for a torpedo, but could carry three 112 lb bombs, and were fitted to carry radio equipment. There was also a Lewis gun in the rear cockpit, that was operated by the observer.

== Operators ==
Greece

- Hellenic Navy

United Kingdom

- Royal Naval Air Service

== Specifications ==
Data from Westland History, Barnes & James

General characteristics

- Crew: two
- Length: 40 ft 7 in (12.38 m)
- Wingspan: 57 ft 3 in (17.45 m)
- Height: 14 ft 1 in (4.29 m)
- Wing area: 575 sq ft (53.4 m^{2})
- Empty weight: 3,500 lb (1,588 kg)
- Gross weight: 4,580 lb (2,077 kg)
- Powerplant: 1 × Salmson 2M7 14-cyl. 2-row water-cooled radial piston engine, 199.9 hp (149.1 kW)

Performance

- Maximum speed: 65 mph (105 km/h, 56 kn)
- Endurance: 4 hours

== See also ==
Related lists

- List of aircraft of the Royal Naval Air Service
- List of flying boats and floatplanes
