= Short Folder =

Folding wing aircraft by Short Brothers

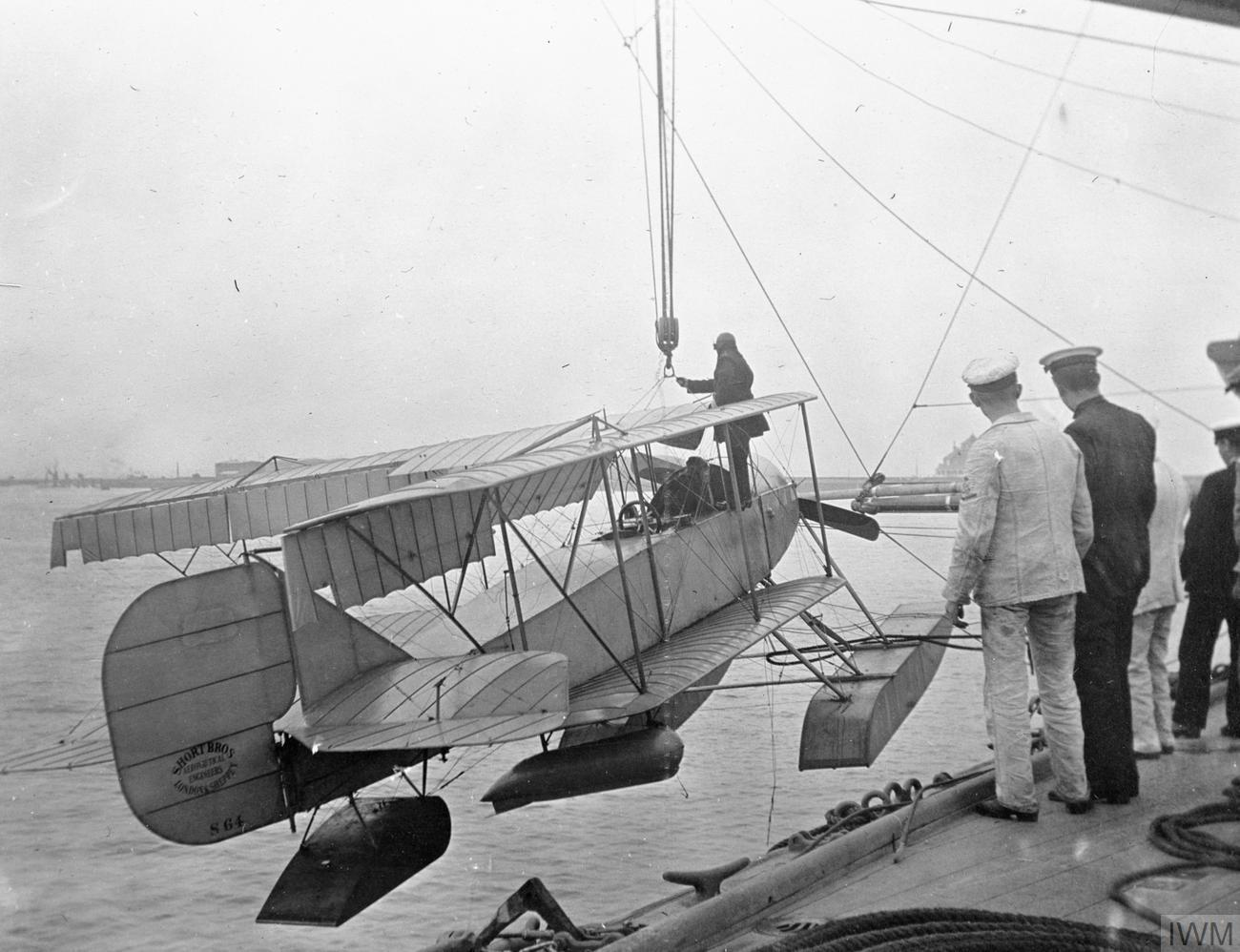
Short Folder in naval service (S.64, RNAS serial no. 81) being hoisted aboard HMS Hermes in July 1913

Short Folder is a generic name often applied to several different Short Brothers' aircraft types designed and built prior to and during World War I. Short Brothers developed and patented folding wing mechanisms for ship-borne aircraft from 1913; the wings were hinged so that they folded back horizontally alongside the fuselage (as shown in the image), reducing the storage space required for stowing them aboard ship.

Shorts produced many "folder" aircraft; in addition large numbers of Shorts' designs were produced by other companies, including Brush Electrical Engineering Co. Ltd., Robey & Co. Ltd., J Samuel White, Frederick Sage & Co. Ltd., S E Saunders Limited, Phoenix Dynamo Manufacturing Company, Supermarine Aviation Works Ltd., Mann, Egerton & Co. Ltd. and Westland Aircraft Works Ltd.

Short Folders saw service in many theatres of World War I, notably in the Cuxhaven Raid in 1914, in the Dardanelles and in the disabling of the SMS Königsberg in East Africa in July 1915. The theatres of war served by the various "folders" ranged from the Arctic Circle through the Mediterranean and Africa to Mesopotamia, although the engines of the time did not perform ideally in hot climates and elevated altitudes.

After World War I, most were retired, although some remained in service with the Greek Navy into the 1920s and with the Estonian Air Force into the 1930s.

== Short Brothers First World War folding-aircraft types ==
(approximate numbers produced in brackets)

- Short S.41 type - experimental prototype (3)
- Short S.63 type - reconnaissance seaplane (4)
- Short Type 81 - reconnaissance/bombing/torpedo-carrying seaplane (5)
- Short Type 166 - reconnaissance/bombing seaplane (26)
- Short Type 184 - reconnaissance/bombing/torpedo-carrying seaplane (936)
- Short Bomber - long-range landplane bomber (83)
- Short Type 827 - reconnaissance/bombing seaplane (108)
- Short Type 830 - reconnaissance/bombing seaplane (18)
- Short 310 - reconnaissance seaplane/torpedo bomber (128)
- Type 320 - reconnaissance seaplane/torpedo bomber (127)

Eight modified Type 830s were produced with a different engine (100 hp Gnome-Monosoupapes instead of the 135 hp Salmson engines)

== Later Short Brothers folding-aircraft types ==
(year of first flight in brackets)

- Short N1B Shirl - shipborne torpedo-bomber (1919)
- Short Sporting Type - commercial biplane floatplane (1919)
- Short SA.1 Sturgeon - prototype anti-submarine aircraft (1946)
- Short SB.6 Seamew - anti-submarine aircraft (1953)

== Bibliography ==
Barnes C.H. & James D.N (1989). Shorts Aircraft since 1900. London: Putnam. p. 560. ISBN 0-85177-819-4.
