= Wight Pusher Seaplane =

Pusher Seaplane
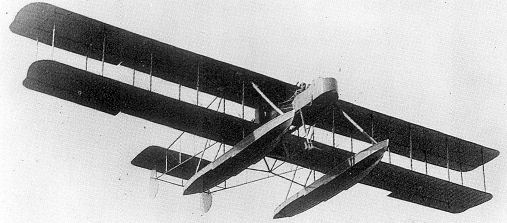
- Wight Pusher Seaplane at the Olympia Exhibition Halls in West London 1914

General information
- Type: Biplane floatplane
- Manufacturer: John Samuel White & Company Limited (Wight Aircraft)
- Primary user: Royal Navy
- Number built: 11

History
- Introduction date: 1914
- First flight: 8 April 1914

The Wight Pusher Seaplane, or Navyplane, was a British twin-float patrol seaplane produced by John Samuel White & Company Limited (Wight Aircraft).

== Design and development ==
Designed by Howard T Wright, the Pusher Seaplane was an enlarged version of the first successful product of the aircraft department of John Samuel White & Company Limited (Wight Aircraft), the Wight Seaplane No.2. The aircraft was an unequal-span pusher biplane with five-bay wings mounted on two long floats. It was powered by a single 200 hp (149 kW) Salmson Canton Unné water cooled radial engine. It was exhibited at the 1914 Olympia Air Show in March that year, and was first flown on 8 April. It exhibited good take-off, climb performance and endurance, with these properties giving rise to orders from both the British Royal Naval Air Service, who ordered three and the German Kaiserliche Marine, who also ordered three. The German aircraft were taken over by the British at the outbreak of the First World War.

Orders for a further seven Improved Navyplane Type A.I followed, these having a stronger airframe, folding wings and an 8 ft (2.4 m) greater wingspan, but retaining the Salmson engine. A further four aircraft were built powered by a 225 hp (168 kW) Sunbeam engine, known as the Improved Navyplane Type A.II.

== Operational history ==
The Navyplanes were used for maritime reconnaissance missions over the North Sea, while four of the Improved Navyplanes were sent to the Dardanelles to serve in the Gallipoli Campaign. The four Sunbeam-powered aircraft proved unsuccessful owing to unreliability of the powerplant, and only saw limited use.

== Operators ==
United Kingdom

- Royal Navy
  - Royal Naval Air Service

== Specifications (Seaplane) ==
Data from The Olympia Aero Show at a Glance

General characteristics

- Crew: 2
- Wingspan: 63 ft 0 in (19.2 m)
- Wing area: 735 sq ft (68.3 m^{2})
- Empty weight: 2,600 lb (1,179 kg)
- Gross weight: 3,500 lb (1,588 kg)
- Powerplant: 1 × Salmson 2M7 14-cyl. 2-row water-cooled radial piston engine, 200 hp (150 kW)

Performance

- Maximum speed: 72 mph (116 km/h, 63 kn)
- Endurance: 6 hours.
- Service ceiling: 9,600 ft (2,900 m)
- Rate of climb: 400 ft/min (2 m/s)
