= List of aircraft (Sh) =

This is a list of aircraft in alphabetical order beginning with 'Sh'.

== Sh ==
=== Shaanxi ===
(Shaanxi Baojii Special Vehicles - China)

- Shaanxi Y-8
- Shaanxi Y-9
- Shaanxi Y-15
- Shaanxi KJ-200
- Shaanxi KJ-500
- Shaanxi KJ-2000

=== Shamrock ===
(Irish Aircraft Co, Sandusky, Ohio, United States)

- Shamrock 3-B
- Shamrock IAC Special

=== Shanghai ===
(China)

- Feilong-1
- Shanghai Y-10

=== Shannon-Buente ===
(James Shannon & Ben E Buente, Evansville, Illinois, United States)

- Shannon-Buente Special

=== Shapley ===
- Shapley Kittiwake

=== Shark.Aero ===
(Shark.Aero s.r.o.)

- Shark.Aero Shark
- Shark.Aero Shark LS
- Shark.Aero Shark UL
- Shark.Aero SportShark

=== Sharp ===
(George E and Loran Sharp, Newhall, California, United States)

- Sharp Meteora

=== Sharp ===
(Jon Sharp)

- Sharp Nemesis
- Sharp Nemesis NXT

=== Sharpe ===
(Graydn L. Sharpe)

- Sharpe SA-1

=== Shavrov ===
(Soviet Union)

- Shavrov Sh-1
- Shavrov Sh-2
- Shavrov Sh-3
- Shavrov Sh-5
- Shavrov Sh-7

=== Shaw ===
()

- Shaw Comet

=== SHBP ===
(Victor Simonet et al.)

- SHBP monoplane

=== Shcherbakov ===
- Shcherbakov Shche-2

=== Shchetinin ===
- Shchetinin M-9
- ShCh M-9
- Shchetinin M-11

=== Sheehan ===
(Wilfred J Sheehan, S Walpole, Maryland, United States)

- Sheehan Parasol

=== Sheffield ===
- Sheffield Skeeter X-1

=== Shelton ===
(Thomas Shelton (aircraft constructor))

- Shelton Flying Wing

=== Shenyang ===
(Shenyang Aircraft Corporation)

- Feilong-1
- Shen Hang-1 Harbin Aviation Polytechnic School
- Hong Zhuan-503 Red Special 红专-503; alternate name for JJ-1
- Shenyang BA-5 J-2s converted to target drones
- Shenyang HU-1 Seagull
- Shenyang HU-2 Petrel
- Shenyang J-2 Chinese-built MiG-15
- Shenyang J-5
- Shenyang J-6 Chinese version of MiG-19
- Shenyang J-8
- Shenyang J-8II
- Shenyang J-10 twin-engine interceptor project; not built
- Shenyang J-11 single-engine lightweight fighter project; not built
- Shenyang J-11 Su-27 built under license
- Shenyang J-13 single-engine fighter project; not built
- Shenyang J-15
- Shenyang J-16
- Shenyang J-35
- Shenyang J-50
- Shenyang JJ-1
- Shenyang JJ-2 Chinese built MiG-15UTI; trainer version of J-2
- Shenyang JJ-5 trainer version of J-5
- Shenyang WZ-9 Divine Eagle
- Shenyang X-5
- Shenyang X-9 Jian Fan
- Shenyang X-10
- Shenyang X-11
- Shenyang Type56 initial name for J-5
- Dongfeng-101 initial name for J-5
- Shenyang F60 designation for F-35 prototype

=== Shenyang/Chengdu ===
(China)

- Shenyang/Chengdu J-5

=== Shenyang Light Aircraft Co. ===
(China)

- HU-1

=== Shepard-Krum ===
(Fred J Shepard & Thomas C Krum, Beaverton OR.)

- Shepard-Krum SC-1 Sportcraft

=== Shepherd ===
(F R Shepherd, Riverbank, California, United States)

- Shepherd Skylark

=== Sheremetyev ===
(Boris Nikolayevich Sheremetyev)

- Sheremetyev ShBM
- Sheremetyev Sh-13

=== Sherpa Aircraft Manufacturing ===
(Sherpa Aircraft Co Inc, Aloha, Oregon, United States. Sherpa Worldwide Inc & Sherpa International Inc.)

- Sherpa Aircraft Sherpa
- Sherpa Aircraft Sherpa 8
- Sherpa Aircraft Sherpa 200
- Sherpa Aircraft Sherpa 300
- Sherpa Aircraft Sherpa 400
- Sherpa Aircraft Sherpa 411
- Sherpa Aircraft Sherpa 500

=== Shigeno ===
(Kiyotake Shigeno)

- Shigeno Wakadori-go

=== Shijiazhuang ===
(Shijiazhuang Aircraft Industry Co.)

- Shijiazhuang Y-5
- Shijiazhuang LE-500 Little Eagle
- Shijiazhuang LE-800
- Shijiazhuang HO300 Seagull
- Shijiazhuang Qingting 5
- Shijiazhuang Qingting 5A
- Shijiazhuang Qingting 5B
- Shijiazhuang Qingting 6

=== Shin Meiwa/ShinMaywa ===
(Japan)

- Shin Meiwa UF-XS technology demonstrator
- Shin Meiwa KJT-1
- Shin Meiwa Tawron
- Shin Meiwa PS-1
- Shin Meiwa US-1
- ShinMaywa US-2

=== Shinn ===
((Clifford) Shinn Engr Co, Santa Ana, California)

- Shinn 2150

=== Shirato ===
(Shirato Hikoki Kenkyusho – Shirato Aeroplane Research Studio)

- Shirato Asahi-go
- Shirato Anzani (Ground Taxi-ing) Trainer
- Shirato Iwao-go
- Shirato Takeru-go (a.k.a. Tamura Tractor or Ichimori Tractor)
- Shirato Kauru-go
- Shirato 16
- Shirato 20
- Shirato 25 Kuma-go
- Shirato 26
- Shirato 28
- Shirato 31
- Shirato 32
- Shirato 37
- Shirato 38
- Shirato 40

=== Shirlen ===
(Roy L Shirlen, Winston-Salem, North Carolina, United States)

- Shirlen Big Cootie

=== Shneider ===
(Fred P. Shneider, 1020 E 178 St, New York, United States)

- Shneider I
- Shneider II
- Shneider 1910 Curtiss pusher

=== Shober ===
(William C Shober, Brookeville, Maryland. c.1973: Shober Aircraft Enterprises, Gaithersburg, Maryland, United States)

- Shober Willie II

=== Shores ===
(Boyd J Shores, Pasadena, California, United States)

- Shores S-1

=== Short Brothers ===
(United Kingdom)

- Short Admiralty Type 74
- Short Admiralty Type 81
- Short Admiralty Type 42
- Short S.81 (1913)
- Short Type 135 (1914)
- Short Type 136 (1914)
- Short Admiralty Type 166
- Short Admiralty Type 184
- Short Type 310
- Short Type 320
- Short Admiralty Type 827
- Short Admiralty Type 830
- Short Biplane No. 1 (1909)
- Short Biplane No. 2 (1909)
- Short Biplane No. 3 (1910)
- Short Bomber
- Short Folder (1913 ff, generic name applied to several types)
- Short Sporting Type (1919)
- Short Tandem Twin
- Short Triple Tractor (S.47)
- Short N.1B Shirl
- Short N.2A Scout
- Short N.2B
- Short N.3 Cromarty
- Short S.27 (construction number)
- Short Improved S.27 (construction number)
- Short S.34 (construction number) ( Dual-control Improved S.27)
- Short S.36 Tractor Biplane (construction number)
- Short S.34 T1 (construction number)
- Short S.38 (1911) (construction number of an Improved S.27, later rebuilt to become new type prototype)
- Short S.39 Triple Twin (construction number)
- Short S.41 Tractor Biplane (construction number)
- Short S.42 monoplane
- Short S.45 T5 (construction number)
- Short S.46 (construction number)
- Short S.47 T4 (construction number)
- Short S.53 Admiralty Type 42 (construction number)
- Short S.54 (construction number)
- Short S.57 (1912) (construction number)
- Short S.60 (construction number)
- Short S.63 Folder Seaplane (construction number)
- Short S.69 (construction number)
- Short S.80 (construction number)
- Short S.81 Gunbus Seaplane (construction number)
- Short S.82 (construction number)
- Short S.87 Type 135 Seaplane (construction number)
- Short S.135 (construction number)
- Short S.301 (140 hp Salmson) Seaplane (construction number)
- Short S.1 Cockle
- Short S.2 (Metal hull for F.5)
- Short S.3 Springbok I 19 April 1923
- Short S.3a Springbok II 25 March 1925
- Short S.3b Chamois
- Short S.4 Satellite
- Short S.5 Singapore I
- Short S.6 Sturgeon
- Short S.7 Mussel
- Short S.8 Calcutta
- Short S.8/8 Rangoon
- Short S.10 Gurnard
- Short S.11 Valetta
- Short S.14 Sarafand
- Short-Kawanishi S.15 KF1
- Short S.16 Scion/Scion II
- Short L.17 Scylla
- Short S.17 Kent
- Short S.18 "Knuckleduster" (also known as Short R.24/31)
- Short S.19 Singapore III
- Short S.20 "Mercury"
- Short S.21 "Maia"
- Short S.22 Scion Senior
- Short Mayo Composite
- Short S.23 Empire C-Class
- Short S.25 Sandringham
- Short S.25 Sunderland
- Short S.26 G-Class
- Short S.29 Stirling
- Short S.30 Empire C-Class
- Short S.31 – Half-scale Stirling
- Short S.32
- Short S.33 Empire C-Class
- Short S.35 Shetland Specification R.14/40
- Short S.36
- Short S.41
- Short S.45 Seaford
- Short S.45 Solent
- Short S.312 Tucano
- Short SA.1 Sturgeon
- Short SA.4 Sperrin
- Short SA.6 Sealand
- Short SB.1
- Short SB.2 Sealand II
- Short SB.3
- Short SB.4 Sherpa
- Short SB.5
- Short SB.6 Seamew
- Short SB.7 Sealand III
- Short SC.1
- Short SC.5 Belfast
- Short SC.7 Skyvan
- Short SD.3-30
- Short 330
- Short 360
- Short C-23 Sherpa
- Short Crusader
- Gnosspelius Gull (1923)
- Short Silver Streak (1920)
- Short Sporting Type
- Short FJX

=== Showa ===
- Showa L2D

=== Showers ===
(Showers-Aero)

- Showers Skytwister Choppy

=== Shriver ===
(Tod Shriver & (?) Dietz, Mineola, New York, United States)

- Shriver 1910 Biplane
