= Short Triple Tractor =

General information
- Type: Experimental aircraft
- National origin: United Kingdom
- Manufacturer: Short Brothers
- Designer: Horace Short
- Number built: 1

History
- First flight: 24 July 1912

The Short S.47 Triple Tractor was one of a series of experimental twin-engined aircraft built by Short Brothers in 1912. It acquired its name because the two engines drove three tractor propellers.

== Design and development ==
The Triple Tractor followed the Tandem Twin and Triple Twin in the series of twin-engined aircraft built by Short Brothers, the intention behind fitting two engines being to produce an aircraft capable of sustaining flight in the event of one engine failing. It was powered by a pair of 50 hp (37 kW) Gnome Double Omega engines mounted in tandem in the extended nose of the aircraft, the front engine driving a single propeller and the other driving a pair of tractor propellers mounted at mid-gap between the wings, using chains. In order to reduce the torque effect of the rotary engines they were arranged to revolve in opposite directions.

The airframe of the Triple Twin was similar to the contemporary S.36, S.41 and S.45 tractor biplanes built by Shorts, being an unequal-span two-seater two-bay biplane, with the square-section fuselage mounted in the gap between the upper and lower wings. The tail surfaces consisted of a rectangular rudder mounted on the sternpost of the fuselage, with a rectangular horizontal stabiliser and split elevator mounted in front of it on top of the fuselage. The crew of two were seated side by side behind the trailing edge of the wings.

== Service history ==
The aircraft was first flown by Frank McClean on 24 July 1912, and after a formal acceptance flight carried out by Lt. C. L'Estrange-Malone, the aircraft was bought by the Admiralty, being given the serial number T.4 at the Eastchurch Naval School. The aircraft performed well, the only problem being the amount of heat generated, earning it the nickname "The Field Kitchen".

== Specifications ==
Data from Barnes 1967, p.87.

General characteristics

- Crew: one
- Capacity: one
- Length: 41 ft 0 in (12.50 m)
- Wingspan: 48 ft 0 in (14.63 m)
- Wing area: 500 sq ft (46 m^{2})
- Powerplant: 2 × Gnome Omega 7-cylinder air-cooled rotary piston engine, 50 hp (37 kW) each
- Propellers: 2-bladed

Performance

- Maximum speed: 60 mph (97 km/h, 52 kn)
- Endurance: 6.5 hours
