= Short S.27 =

Early British Military biplane made by the Short Brothers

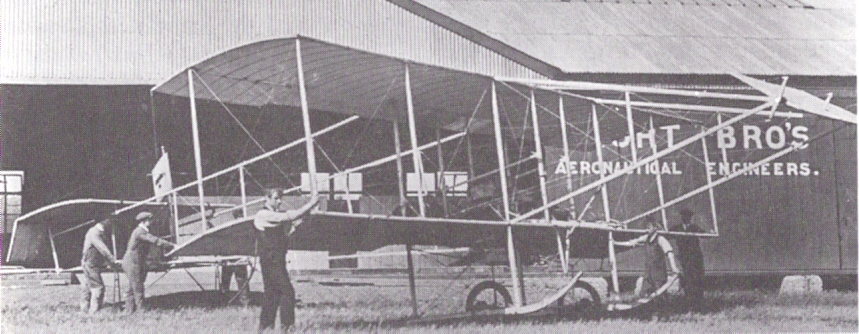
- Short S.27

General information
- Type: Training and experimental
- National origin: United Kingdom
- Manufacturer: Short Brothers
- Primary user: Royal Naval Air Service

History
- First flight: 1910

The Short S.27 and its derivative, the Short Improved S.27 (sometimes called the Short-Sommer biplane), were a series of early British aircraft built by Short Brothers. They were used by the Admiralty and Naval Wing of the Royal Flying Corps for training the Royal Navy's first pilots as well as for early naval aviation experiments. An Improved S.27 was used by C.R. Samson to make the first successful take-off from a moving ship on 9 May 1912.

== Design and development ==
=== S.27 ===
In May 1910 Shorts started construction of four examples of an aircraft designed by Horace Short based on the successful Farman III pusher configuration biplane. Four examples were built, being given the airframe numbers S.26, S.27, S.28 and S.30. S.26 was built for Francis McClean and had a 40 hp (30 kW) Green engine, this engine also being used for S.28, built for J.T.C. Moore-Brabazon. S.27 was built for Cecil Grace and had a 60 hp (45 kW) E.N.V. type F engine. S.29 was built as a reserve airframe. Since Grace flew his machine at a large number of aviation events, the design became generally known as the Short S.27.

The aircraft was an equal span pusher biplane with a monoplane tailplane and an elevator mounted on booms forward of the wings, the elevator being extended outboard of the supporting booms. Single-acting ailerons were fitted to both upper and lower wings. The Green engined aircraft had a single rudder mounted underneath the tailplane, while Grace's E.N.V. engined example had an additional rudder mounted above it. The undercarriage was simpler than Farman's design, and consisted of a pair of wheels mounted on an axle attached to the skids: supplementary tailskids were attached to the ends of the tail booms.

=== Improved S.27 ===
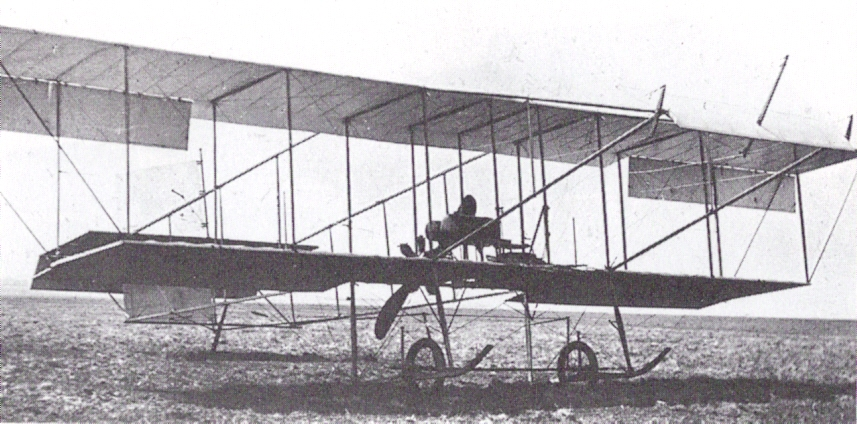
An Improved S.27 series aeroplane with extended upper wing.

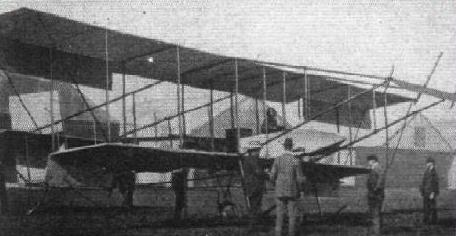
An Improved S.27 with nacelle for the pilot and passenger.

The S.27 served as the basis of various Shorts aircraft which followed. These differed from the S.27 in having strut-braced extensions to their upper wings, increasing the upper wingspan by 12 feet 3 inches (3.73 metres), a strengthened wing structure, and a reduced span front elevator without the sections outboard of the booms. They were powered by a 50 or 70 hp (37 or 52 kW) Gnome rotary engine. One (S.35) was built with a nacelle for the pilot and passenger, seated in tandem: a similar nacelle was later fitted to S.34. Some were built with dual controls for instructional purposes. Many of the aircraft built were later extensively rebuilt, in effect becoming different types.

== Operational history ==
The date of the first flight by an aircraft of the type is not on record, but the issue of Flight dated 4 June 1910 carried a photograph of the aircraft and an article which records that several successful flights had been made by Cecil Grace, referring to the aircraft as No.27. Both S.26 and S.27 were flying by 19 June 1910. S.26 was flown by G.C. Colmore, a complete novice who, after twenty minutes of taxying trials, completed two and a half circuits of the airfield before having to land because of trouble with the engine. The following day he succeeded in qualifying for his pilot's licence, the fifteenth awarded by the Royal Aero Club.

On 20 June Grace set a new British altitude record in S.27, reaching a height of 1,180 ft (360 m), and later that month flew it at the Midland Aero Club meeting held at Dunstall Park, Wolverhampton between 27 June and 2 July 1910. Here he made what was judged the most spectacular flight of the meeting, remaining aloft for nearly half an hour and reaching an altitude of over 500 ft (150 m).

Later, S.29 was completed for Cecil Grace with a 60 hp (45 kW) E.N.V. engine in order to make an attempt to win the Baron de Forest Prize for the longest flight to be made in an all-British machine from the United Kingdom to a destination in mainland Europe before the end of 1910. Grace made his attempt on 22 December 1910, starting from Dover. He succeeded in crossing the English Channel, but landed near Calais due to poor visibility. Later that day he took advantage of an improvement in weather conditions to attempt to fly back to Dover, but after take-off encountered severe fog, and misjudged his course. He was sighted by the North Goodwin lightship, and a coastguard at Ramsgate reported hearing the sound of an aircraft engine some distance offshore, but no further trace of Grace or his aircraft were found.

In late 1910 McClean, who was about to take part in an expedition to Fiji and Tasmania to observe a solar eclipse offered to loan two aircraft to the Admiralty for them to be used to train naval officers to fly, and Cecil Grace offered his services as an unpaid instructor. After Grace's death George Cockburn offered to replace him. These offers were accepted, and from the 200 volunteers Lieutenants Charles R. Samson, R. Gregory, and Arthur M. Longmore from the Royal Navy and Lieutenant E. L. Gerrard of the Royal Marine Light Infantry were selected. They reported for flight training at Eastchurch airfield on 1 March 1911 and earned their wings in six weeks. In October 1911, the Royal Navy purchased the two aircraft and established the Naval Flying School, Eastchurch, at Eastchurch airfield.

Besides being used for training, S.27 and Improved S.27 aircraft also were used in various early naval aviation experiments. The most famous example was one of the two belonging to the Naval Flying School, Eastchurch, with the manufacturer's number S.38, which achieved a number of aviation firsts over a period of a few months in 1911 and 1912.

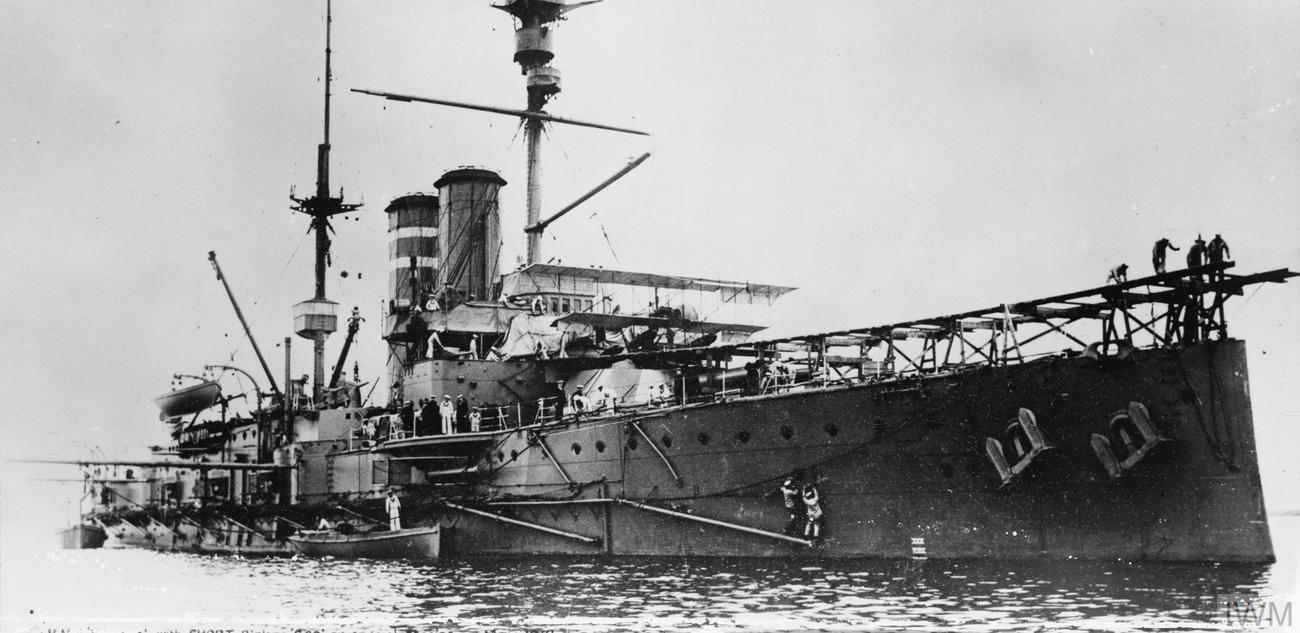
No.38 perched on the foredeck runway installed on HMS Hibernia, shortly before Commander Charles Samson piloted it on the world's first aircraft take-off from a moving ship on 9 May 1912.

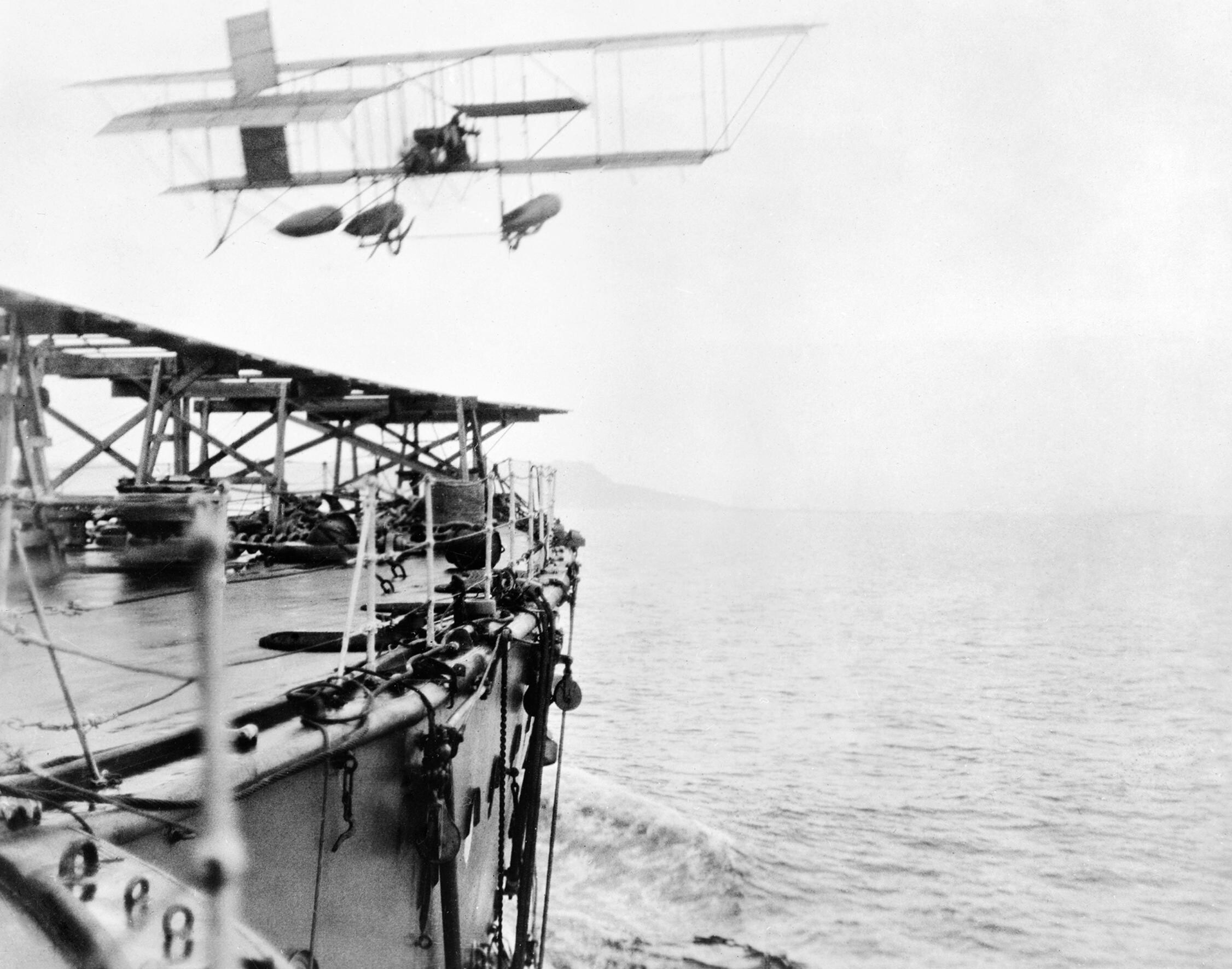
Commander Samson's historic take-off from HMS Hibernia. The three streamlined air bags used for flotation are clearly visible.

In 1911, Lieutenant Longmore and Oswald Short installed streamlined air bags on the undercarriage struts and under the tail of Improved S.27 No. 38 to enable the aircraft to land on water. On 1 December 1911, Longmore used the aircraft to become the first person in the United Kingdom to take off from land and make a successful water landing when he landed in the river Medway off Sheerness, after which No.38 was brought ashore and flown back to Eastchurch. A flying-off platform was constructed over the foredeck and forward 12-inch (305 mm) gun turret of the pre-dreadnought battleship HMS Africa, and on 10 January 1912 Samson, piloting No.38, used the platform while Africa was anchored off Sheerness to make the United Kingdom's first successful aeroplane take-off from a ship. The platform was later transferred to the battleship HMS Hibernia.

S.38 was one of four naval aircraft to take part in the 1912 Fleet Review at Weymouth, the others being a Short S.41 tractor biplane, a Deperdussin monoplane and a Nieuport monoplane. It was flown by Samson (now promoted to the rank of Commander) and Lieut. Gregory. A convincing display of the possibilities of naval aviation was made in the presence of King George V, including a demonstration of the use of aircraft for spotting submerged submarines and the dropping of a 300 lb (140 kg) dummy bomb by Gregory. On 9 May, the second day of the review, Samson flew No.38 off Hibernia, now fitted with the ramp, while the ship was under way, the first time that this had been done. Afterwards the ramp was again transferred, this time to the battleship HMS London, and Samson repeated the feat on 4 July.

Another very public display of the aircraft was made by McClean on 10 August 1912, when "remembering an appointment in Town", he flew S.33, equipped with floats, from Eastchurch to Westminster, flying up the Thames. Unable to gain enough height to fly over Tower Bridge, he flew between the bascules and the upper walkway of the bridge, and then flew under the remaining bridges before alighting at Westminster, skimming the water at Blackfriars Bridge and Waterloo Bridge. This exploit did not amuse the authorities, and for his return journey he was obliged to taxy the aircraft down the Thames as far as Shadwell Basin, where on attempting take off the aircraft sideslipped, damaging one of the floats: the aircraft was returned to Eastchurch by road.

Two examples fitted with dual controls, S.43 and S.44, were supplied to the newly established Central Flying School at RAF Upavon in July 1912, where they were still in service in late 1914.

== Variants ==
=== S.38 ===
Airframe number S.38 was an Improved S.27, used by the RNAS. On 9 July 1912, it was damaged while being hoisted aboard HMS London. It was returned to Shorts, and rebuilt with extensive modifications. The modified aircraft became the basis of a new type, the Short S.38.

=== Short Triple Twin ===
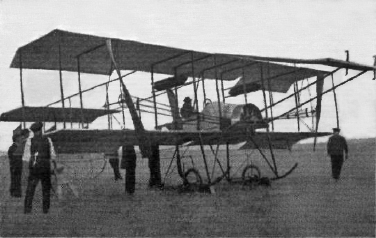
The "Triple Twin"

Shorts airframe number S.39 was given to an experimental twin-engined aircraft based on the Type S.27, the Triple Twin. This was powered by two 50 hp Gnome Omega engines, one in the front of the nacelle driving a pair of tractor propellers mounted on the interplane struts, with the chain drive to the left-hand propeller crossed so that the front propellers revolved in opposite directions, and the second engine mounted behind the trailing edge of the lower wing driving a pusher propeller. As first built and flown the wings were of equal span, with trailing edge ailerons fitted to both upper and lower wings. It was first flown by McClean on 18 September 1911 and bought by the Admiralty in June 1912, being given the serial number T.3.

A number of modifications were subsequently made to the aircraft. In December 1911 the upper wings were extended and the fuel capacity was increased: the extensions were removed in February, and fitted to the Tandem Twin. In October both upper and lower wings were extended, giving it a wingspan of 50 ft (15 m), and the top wing was later further extended, giving it an upper span of 64 ft (20 m).

In early 1913 the S.39 was completely rebuilt as a single-engined pusher without a front elevator and a similar tail unit to the production Short S.38, with balanced rudders. In this form it was referred to as the Admiralty Type 3, and had a rather better performance than a standard Type 38. Its top speed was 65 mph (105 km/h) and ceiling was over 9,000 ft (2,700 m). It was among the aircraft used in France by the RNAS in the early months of the First World War, being used as a communications aircraft.

=== Short Tandem Twin ===
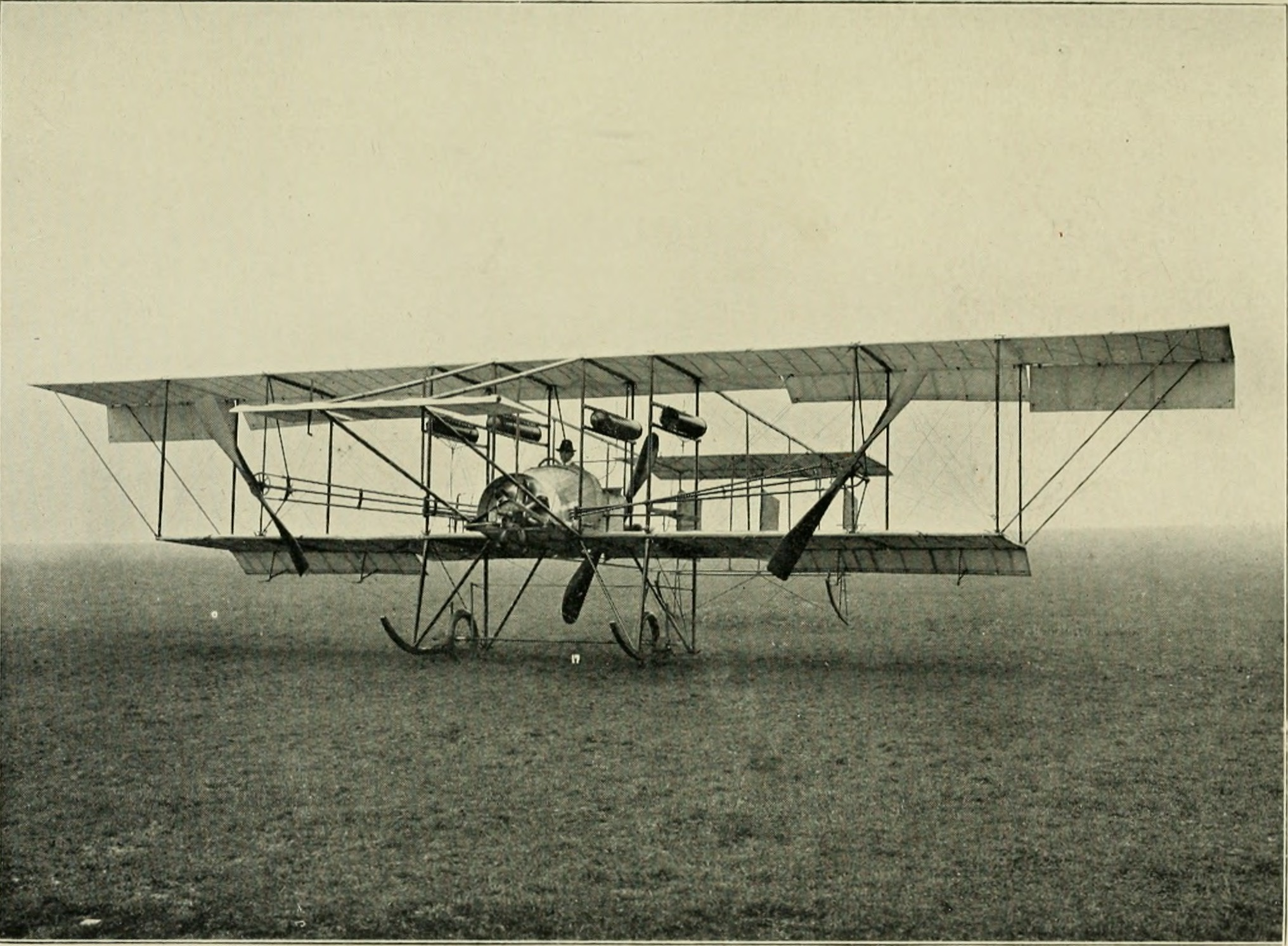
Tandem Twin

The Tandem Twin was another early example of a twin engine aircraft. It was built for Francis McClean, using parts of S.27. fitted with a short nacelle on top of the lower wing with a 50 hp (37 kW) Gnome Omega at either end, access to the cockpit being via a hole in the nacelle floor. Tail surfaces were modified by the addition of an extra pair of rectangular rudders above the tailplane. It was first flown by McClean on 29 October 1911. with equal-span wings: extensions were later fitted to the upper wing. The aircraft suffered from stability problems due to insufficient aileron control and unpredictable variations caused by the rear propeller working in the wake of the front one. It was lent to the RNAS for pilot training and was eventually crashed by Samson. The aircraft was given the nicknames the Vacuum Cleaner and the Gnome Sandwich.

=== Short S.32 (modified) ===
In 1913 Frank McClean and J.H. Spottiswoode determined to undertake an aerial expedition up the Nile. Realising that this would require an aircraft with a low wing loading McClean got Shorts to build him an aircraft which was largely a rebuild of S.32 but possibly incorporated components from S.33 and S.34. The resultant machine had an extra bay added to the wings and the overhanging extensions were enlarged, bringing the wingspan up to 70 ft 6 in (21.49 m). The aircraft was also given an elongated nacelle with the front elevator mounted on an upswept outrigger on its nose and paired rudders were fitted. The aircraft retained the original 70 hp (52 kW) Gnome Lambda. However its performance was disappointing and McClean had a new design, the Short S.80, built. The airframe was subsequently further modified, principally by removing the extended wings, to convert it into a Type 38.

== List of individual aircraft ==
(Reference:)

- S.26 Initially Green engined and built for McClean, becoming No.3 in his fleet list. Flown by Lt. G.C. Colmore to gain his aero club certificate, the first issued to a naval officer. After a crash at the Lanark aviation meeting in August 1910 it was rebuilt with reduced span front elevator and a 50 hp Gnome, and was used by McClean to gain his Aero Club certificate on 19 September. Lent to the Navy for flight training at Eastchurch, where it acquired the nicknames The Dud and The Owd Bitch
- S.27 Owned by Cecil Grace. After his death bought by McClean (Fleet No.11) and fitted with a Gnome engine. Used for training naval pilots at Easthurch and later rebuilt to become the Tandem Twin.
- S.28 Green engine, initially owned by Moore-Brabazon, then sold to McClean (Fleet No.5) and fitted with a 50 hp Gnome. Used for training purposes at Eastchurch. Crashed & rebuilt as S.38
- S.29 Powered by an E.N.V engine and fitted with extended upper wings and other modifications for Cecil Grace, who lost his life in the aircraft on 22 December 1910 in an attempt to win the Baron de Forest prize.
- S.32 Built for Frank McClean (Fleet No.8.). Fitted with side by side seating and dual control. Used by the Territorials for flight training. Later rebuilt with 70 ft span, and renumbered No.14. Later presented to the Admiralty, (No.904) rebuilt as a Type 38, flown by the Navy as No. 904, and used for flight training at Hendon.
- S.33 Built for Frank McClean (Fleet No.13). Later fitted with floats, and renumbered 13A. The aircraft used by McClean to fly through Tower Bridge.
- S.34 Long Range version, "Naval Biplane No. 3". Bought by the Admiralty and became "No. 1 Biplane" and later "B1" and then "T1" and then "1"
- S.35 Built for Maurice Egerton, 4th Baron Egerton, with a nacelle. 50 hp Gnome, ailerons on top wing only. Damaged in a landing accident on 13 January 1912 and probably rebuilt as a Triple Twin.
- S.38 Built for the RNAS a replacement for S.28. 70 hp Gnome. Notably flown by C.R. Samson to make the first take off from a moving ship. Later substantially rebuilt to effectively become the prototype of a new design, the Short S.38 Type, keeping number RNAS2.
- S.39 The Triple Twin, later rebuilt as the Admiralty Type 3
- S.43 Dual control, used by RFC for flight training at Upavon.
- S.44 As above.

== Nomenclature ==
In the period before the First World War Short Brothers did not assign type designations to their aircraft, which instead had individual airframe numbers, prefixed by the letter 'S'. Type numbers were given retrospectively, generally using the airframe number of the first aircraft of the type. In addition those aircraft originally owned by Frank McClean were given individual numbers by him, and aircraft operated by the Admiralty had a naval serial number: this system underwent a number of changes.

After the First World War Shorts began giving aircraft a Design Index number, S.1 being given to the Short Cockle.

== Replica ==
There is a non-flying replica of an S.27 on display at the Fleet Air Arm Museum at RNAS Yeovilton In 1971 a replica was produced of the 1910 Short S.29 using a 60 hp ENV V-8 engine. The example was displayed at the Old Rhinebeck Aerodrome in the United States.

== Operators ==
United Kingdom

- Royal Naval Air Service

== Specifications (Improved S.27) ==
Data from Barnes 1967, p.70

General characteristics

- Crew: 2
- Length: 42 ft 1 in (12.83 m)
- Wingspan: 46 ft 5 in (14.15 m)
- Wing area: 517 sq ft (48.0 m^{2})
- Empty weight: 1,100 lb (499 kg)
- Gross weight: 1,540 lb (699 kg)
- Powerplant: 1 × Gnome Omega 7 cylinder air-cooled rotary engine, 50 hp (37 kW)

Performance

- Maximum speed: 48 mph (77 km/h, 42 kn)
- Wing loading: 3 lb/sq ft (15 kg/m^{2})

== See also ==
Related lists

- List of aircraft of the Royal Naval Air Service
