= George Cyril Colmore =

English aviator

- Born: 14 September 1885; Hathern, Loughborough, Leicestershire, England
- Died: 23 June 1937 (aged 51); Cirencester, Gloucestershire, England
- Military career
- Allegiance: United Kingdom
- Branch: Royal Naval Air Service; Royal Air Force
- Rank: Squadron Commander

George Cyril Colmore (1885–1937) was an English aviator and the first Royal Naval Air Service officer to gain a Royal Aero Club Aviators Licence.

== Military career ==
Colmore was born at Hathern, Leicestershire on 14 September 1885 and in 1901 he enrolled, aged 15, as an Officer Cadet at the Thames Nautical Training College (also known as HMS Worcester) in Dartford, Kent. In 1910, at his own expense, he joined the Royal Aero Club and learned to fly at the Royal Naval Flying School, Eastchurch. On 21 June 1910 he received Aviators Certificate No. 15 flying a Short biplane. Following his success the RAeC approached the Admiralty offering to train further naval aviators.

In 1917 Colmore was promoted Squadron Commander in command of the Wormwood Scrubs Royal Naval Air Station.

== Family ==
Colmore married Phyllis Isobel Fellowes (died 1963), daughter of the late Captain Peregrine Fellowes on 25 January 1911 at St Peter's Church, South Kensington although the couple divorced in May 1921 on grounds of adultery; they had two children.
