= Short S.80 =

General information
- Type: Seaplane
- National origin: United Kingdom
- Manufacturer: Short Brothers
- Designer: Horace Short
- Number built: 1

History
- First flight: 2 October 1913

The Short S.80 was an early British floatplane built by Short Brothers for Frank McClean to undertake an aerial expedition up the Nile to investigate the cataracts between Aswan and Khartoum. After a successful flight to Khartoum it was returned to England, where it was used for training by the RNAS. When built it was the largest successful aircraft that had been constructed in Britain. It was also known as the Short Nile Pusher Biplane Seaplane.

== Development ==
Realising that operation in the hot climate of Egypt would require an aircraft with a low wing-loading, McClean got Shorts to modify one of his Short S.27 biplanes by fitting it with extended wings. This proved underpowered, and Shorts, therefore, constructed a new aircraft for McClean, using a 160 hp (120 kW) Gnome Double Lambda two-row rotary engine. Of similar configuration to the modified S.27, the S.80 was an unequal-span three-bay pusher biplane, with a nacelle mounted on the lower wing to accommodate pilot and passengers in two pairs of side-by-side seats, with the engine behind them driving a pusher propeller. The nacelle was extended forward to carry a front-mounted elevator mounted on upswept outriggers, and the empennage, consisting of a high-mounted tailplane and elevator with a pair of rudders mounted below, was carried on wire-braced wooden booms behind the wings. A pair of rectangular-section unstepped floats were mounted below the wing, supplemented by a pair of airbags mounted at the end of each lower tailboom.

== Operational history ==
The S.80 was first flown by Gordon Bell on 2 October 1913, and on 19 November a weight carrying trial was made, in which it was flown with five passengers. It was then dismantled and shipped to Alexandria aboard the SS Corsican Prince.

=== The Nile Expedition ===
After reassembly at the Naval Dockyard in Alexandria, McClean, Alec Ogilvie, Horace Short and the expedition mechanic Gus Smith flew the 255 mi (410 km) to Cairo on 2 January 1914. This was the limit of the aircraft's range, and Spottiswoode had to establish a set of fuel dumps at 120 mi (190 km) intervals along the planned route. Once this had been done the party set off for Upper Egypt, arriving at Aswan on 15 January. Problems were encountered with overheating of the rear row of cylinders, and on taking off from Aswan the performance fell off so badly that after forty miles McClean returned to Aswan, taxiing most of the way. On reaching Aswan it was found that four cylinders needed to be replaced. After these had been sent from Paris the expedition resumed on 16 February, when the 192 mi (309 km) flight to Wadi Halfa was made. After two days rest they started the next stage, which followed the course of the Nile round the Great Bend in order to see the second, third and fourth cataracts: this was interrupted by an encounter with a violent dust-storm, which forced McClean to land, damaging one wingtip. After this was repaired the flight continued to Merowe and then to Abu Hamed. On leaving Abu Hamed an oil-pump failed: a landing was made on the river and the aircraft was taxied to Shereyk, where the party waited until a spare pump could be sent. However, soon after leaving Shereyk both oil-pumps failed, and in the resulting emergency landing near Gananita Island a float and the tail-booms were damaged. A ten-day delay followed, and on 14 March they flew to Atbara: the next day Kabushia was reached, where a connecting rod broke, extensively damaging the engine, which was sent back to the railway workshops at Atbara. The repaired engine was fitted by 22 March, when the final stage to Khartoum was completed. After a day of giving joy-rides the aircraft was then dismantled and sent back to England.

=== Subsequent history ===
On its return to England the S.80 was largely rebuilt, with new wings and tailbooms and a tailplane of reduced chord. The front elevator was deleted, and the nacelle was modified to a side-by side two-seater layout with dual controls, the space formerly occupied by the other two seats now being used for the fuel tank. On 1 August 1914 McClean flew the aircraft to the Isle of Grain and presented it to the Admiralty, where it was re-engined with a 100 hp (75 kW) Gnome Monosoupape driving a four-bladed propeller and fitted with a fixed fin, half above and half below the tailplane, and given Admiralty number 905. Since it was underpowered it could not take off from calm water in low wind conditions, and was used for taxiing practice by pilots converting from landplanes.

== Specifications ==
Data from Barnes 1967, p.70

General characteristics

- Crew: 1
- Capacity: 3
- Length: 33 ft 9 in (10.29 m)
- Wingspan: 67 ft (20 m)
- Wing area: 540 sq ft (50 m^{2})
- Empty weight: 2,200 lb (998 kg)
- Gross weight: 3,600 lb (1,633 kg)
- Powerplant: 1 × Gnome Double Lambda 14-cylinder two-row air cooled rotary, 160 hp (120 kW)
- Propellers: 2-bladed

Performance

- Maximum speed: 60 mph (97 km/h, 52 kn)

== See also ==
Related development

- Short S.81
