= Short Sporting Type =

Single-engined biplane seaplane

Sporting Type Seaplane

General information
- Type: Commercial folder biplane seaplane
- National origin: United Kingdom
- Manufacturer: Short Brothers
- Designer: Francis Webber
- Number built: 3

History
- Introduction date: 1920
- First flight: 10 December, 1919
- Retired: 1924

The Short Sporting Type Seaplane was a single-engined biplane seaplane which first flew in 1919, Shorts' first post-World War I aircraft. Originally designed to a Royal Air Force (RAF) specification issued during the war for two training seaplanes, three aircraft were produced as a commercial venture. Only the first was sold, the other two being cannibalised for parts and then scrapped in 1924.

This design is often referred to as the Short Shrimp although this name was applied only to the first Sporting Type.

== Design ==
The Sporting Type was designed to meet RAF specification number RAF XXXII. It was a four-seat, single-engined biplane with twin wooden floats mounted on wire-braced struts below the fuselage. It had two cockpits, the forward cockpit for the pilot and a passenger sitting in tandem, the other for two passengers sitting abreast; the rear cockpit could also function as cargo room, increasing the aircraft's operational flexibility. The fuselage was of semi-monocoque plywood construction with a fabric fairing.

The upper and lower wings were of equal span and chord; on the first aircraft (named Shrimp) the lower wing had a slight dihedral, while the upper wing was flat. On the two later aircraft, both wings had equal dihedral. All three were fitted with folding wings (which Shorts had developed and patented in the years 1913 -1915).

In plan view, the twin-mainfloats, like those of the Short N.2B, were square-fronted with a slight increase in beam from front to rear, while the stern tapered to a point like a mitred arch. They had a concave bottom (the edges were protected by metal strips) and a sharp step at approximately 3/4 length; a tailfloat was fitted to the fuselage below the conventional tailplane. Attached to the rear of the tailfloat was a taxying rudder, with an additional drop-plate which improved steering on water, and which, thanks to the hinged mounting at the forward end, would rise up into its recess in the tailfloat on contact with the ground when beaching. Wingtip floats were deemed unnecessary. A detail drawing, which appeared in Flight Magazine in 1920, showed the empennage and tailfloat assembly, including the hinged rudder drop-plate.

There was also provision for the attachment of beaching wheels: Each float had a watertight transverse tube, to which a mainwheel could be fitted, and there was a socket for a detachable swivelling tailwheel at the rear of the tailfloat, just forward of the taxying rudder. A side view photograph of the Sporting Type (taken at Olympia in July 1920), showing the port beaching-wheel in place, was published in Flight Magazine.

== Development ==
The first of the three Sporting Types, (Shrimp), was powered by a Beardmore 160 hp (119 kW) engine. Registered G-EAPZ, it was first flown on 10 December, 1919 by test pilot J.L. Parker. Shortly afterwards it was bought by the Australian Lebbeus Hordern, who learned to fly in it. Having had the Beardmore engine replaced by the 230 hp (172 kW) Siddeley Puma, he shipped it to Australia in 1921, where it was reregistered as G-AUPZ in June 1922 (later VH-UPZ). The Shrimp was used in two surveys of the coast of New Guinea, during which a film was made which was later shown in the UK under the name "Pearls and Savages". It crashed in Sidney Harbour in January 1923 and was written off.

The two further Sporting Types remained unnamed. The second was fitted first with the Puma engine and flew for the first time on 28-07-1920, after having been displayed in the same month at London's Olympia exhibition centre. It was found by Parker to have greater lateral stability than the Shrimp, due to the dihedral on both wings. Following an accident in September of the same year, the Puma was replaced by a 300 hp (224 kW) Hispano-Suiza engine. The third aircraft, which first flew on 21-01-1921, was fitted with the Puma engine. Neither aircraft was sold and both were taken out of service and cannibalised for engines and instruments before being scrapped in 1924.

== Specifications (with Siddeley Puma engine) ==
Data from Barnes & James 1989, pp.159-162.

General characteristics

- Crew: 2
- Capacity: 2 passengers
- Length: 36 ft 9 in (11.20 m)
- Wingspan: 44 ft 6 in (13.56 m)
- Wing area: 510 sq ft (47 m^{2})
- Gross weight: 3,554 lb (1,612 kg)
- Powerplant: 1 × Siddeley Puma 6-cylinder water-cooled inline piston engine, 230 hp (170 kW)

Performance

- Maximum speed: 95 mph (153 km/h, 83 kn)
- Range: 270 mi (430 km, 230 nmi)

== See also ==
Aircraft of comparable role, configuration, and era

- Short N.2B
