= Shavrov Sh-7 =

Soviet civil transport aircraft

Sh-7
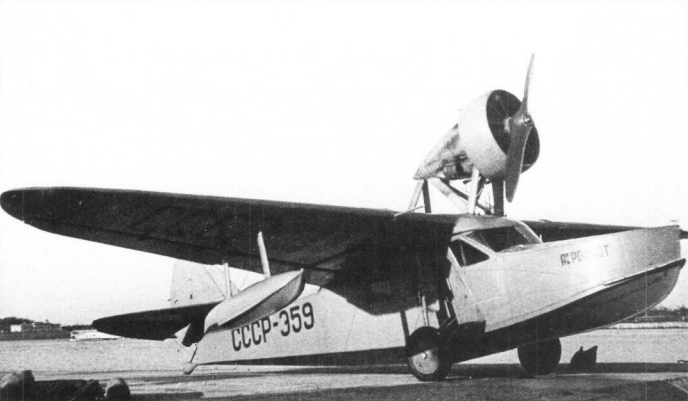

General information
- Type: Civil transport amphibious aircraft
- National origin: Soviet Union
- Manufacturer: Shavrov
- Designer: Vadim Shavrov
- Number built: 1

History
- First flight: 16 June 1940

The Shavrov Sh-7 was a Soviet civil transport amphibious aircraft designed by Vadim Shavrov. Although it was ordered into production for Aeroflot, the start of the Great Patriotic War resulted in only a single prototype being built.

== Design and development ==
The Sh-7 was an amphibious flying boat with a cantilever monoplane wing mounted high on the fuselage. It had a crew of two and a cabin for four passengers. Its single MG-31F engine was strut-mounted above the wing, driving a two-bladed propeller. The prototype first flew on 16 June 1940 and by the end of the year it was decided to put the type into production. The start of the Great Patriotic War in June 1941 halted production and the prototype was then used to carry freight and passengers between Saratov and Astrakhan for a few months.

== Specifications ==
Data from The History of Soviet Aircraft from 1918

General characteristics

- Crew: 2
- Capacity: 4 passengers
- Length: 9.4 m (30 ft 10 in)
- Wingspan: 13 m (42 ft 8 in)
- Wing area: 23.30 m^{2} (251 sq ft)
- Empty weight: 1,230 kg (2,712 lb)
- Gross weight: 1,900 kg (4,189 lb)
- Powerplant: 1 × MG-31F , 246 kW (330 hp)

Performance

- Maximum speed: 218 km/h (136 mph, 118 kn)
- Range: 920 km (497 mi, 432 nmi)
- Service ceiling: 2,960 m (9,710 ft)

== See also ==
Related lists

- List of flying boats and floatplanes
