= Sheffield Skeeter X-1 =

Skeeter X-1

General information
- Type: Single-seat lightweight homebuilt aircraft
- National origin: United States
- Manufacturer: Sheffield Aircraft Limited
- Designer: Kenneth Sheffield
- Number built: 1

History
- First flight: April 1970

The Sheffield Skeeter X-1 is an American single-seat lightweight homebuilt aircraft designed and built by Kenneth Sheffield of Littleton, Colorado. Designed for amateur construction only the prototype was built.

== Design and development ==
Kenneth Sheffield set out to design a low-cost, easy-to-build aircraft. He included folding wings, a simple structure and powered it with a Volkswagen air-cooled engine. Design was started in 1966 and by April 1970 the Skeeter X-1, registered N117 had flown. The Skeeter X-1 is a parasol strut-braced monoplane with a welded steel fuselage. The fuselage is covered in wood and metal in the cockpit area but the aft-structure is uncovered and the pilot sits in an open cockpit. The two-spar wings fold for transportation, and they have ailerons, but no trim tabs or flaps. The wooden tail is strut and wire braced and fabric covered, and the landing gear is a fixed tailwheel type with a steerable tailwheel. The Skeeter X-1 was designed to me powered by any converted Volkswagen engine from 50 to 72 hp (37 to 54 kW), the prototype had a 72 hp (54 kW) Volkswagen converted motor-car engine driving a two-bladed fixed pitch tractor propeller designed by Sheffield.

The Skeeter X-1 was registered by the Federal Aviation Administration in the experimental homebuilt category and the company planned to sell plans and finished propellers to customers but only the prototype appears to have been built.

== Specifications ==
Data from Jane's All the World's Aircraft 1973-74

General characteristics

- Crew: 1
- Length: 13 ft 6 in (4.11 m)
- Wingspan: 22 ft 0 in (6.71 m)
- Height: 6 ft 0 in (1.83 m)
- Wing area: 90 sq ft (8.36 m^{2})
- Empty weight: 500 lb (227 kg)
- Gross weight: 780 lb (354 kg)
- Powerplant: 1 × Volkswagen converted motor-car engine , 72 hp (54 kW)

Performance

- Maximum speed: 85 mph (136 km/h, 74 kn)
- Stall speed: 42 mph (67 km/h, 36 kn)
- Range: 160 mi (257 km, 140 nmi)
- Service ceiling: 11,000 ft (3,350 m)
- Rate of climb: 600 ft/min (3.0 m/s)
