= Sharpe SA-1 =

SA-1

General information
- Type: Homebuilt aircraft
- National origin: United States
- Designer: Graydn L. Sharpe

History
- Introduction date: 1957

The Sharpe SA-1 is an American single seat homebuilt aircraft.

== Design and development ==
The SA-1 is a single place conventional landing gear-equipped mid-wing aircraft developed in 1957. The wing is constructed from a cut-down Luscombe 8. The landing gear is from a J-3 Cub.

== Specifications (SA-1) ==
Data from Air Progress

General characteristics

- Crew: 1
- Powerplant: 1 × Continental A65 horizontally opposed piston aircraft engine, 65 hp (48 kW)

== See also ==
Aircraft of comparable role, configuration, and era

- Bowers Fly Baby
