= Shirato Iwao-go =

Iwao-go

General information
- Type: ciivil floatplane
- National origin: Japan
- Manufacturer: Shirato Aeroplane Research Studio
- Number built: 1

History
- First flight: 3 March 1916

The Shirato Iwao-go was Japan's first civil seaplane. It was a single engine biplane floatplane and performed well enough to give a number of exhibition flights.

== Design and development ==
The Iwao-go was designed soon after Otogiiro Itoh's Shirato ''Asahi-go'' landplane and shared some of its characteristics. Iwao-go translates to Rock, via the Japanese word Iwa (岩) plus -go (type). It was a wood-framed biplane, with more than two bays defined by parallel, tall interplane struts to the forward and rear wing edges. There were no cabane struts but the innermost interplane struts were close to the fuselage. Its straight-edged wings were fabric covered; both upper and lower wings carried generous ailerons. It is not known if the upper wing had greater span than the lower, as it did on the Asahi-go.

Its fuselage was flat-sided with rounded upper decking ahead of the open cockpit, placed behind the wing trailing edge; there was a central, shallow cut-out in the upper edge to improve the pilot's upward field of view and the large interplane gap provided a good forward view. The 60 hp (45 kW) Indian rotary engine was, as in many rotary installations, shrouded above and on its sides, though open below to drain lost oil downwards.

Each of the Iwao-go's floats were mounted on a pair of V-struts to the wing near the bottom of the interplane struts with another, single strut to the engine mounting.

== Operational history ==
Construction began on 28 January 1916. Just over a month later, on 1 March, Einosuke Shirato took it on its first flight. Exhibition flights began a fortnight later with a flight from Lake Suwa. Unfortunately, after the Iwao-go hit a log on Lake Biwa a newspaper which had sponsored the event took Shirato to court for failing provide it. They settled out of court but in doing so ownership of the seaplane passed to one of Shirato's assistants. He soon lost interest in it, bringing its brief career to an end.

== Specifications ==
Data from Japanese Aircraft 1910-1941

General characteristics

- Crew: one
- Length: 7.50 m (24 ft 7 in)
- Wingspan: 11 m (36 ft 1 in)
- Wing area: 29 m^{2} (310 sq ft)
- Empty weight: 400 kg (882 lb)
- Powerplant: 1 × Hendee Indian nine cylinder rotary, 45 kW (60 hp)
- Propellers: 2-bladed
