= Short Biplane No. 3 =

Short Biplane No.3

General information
- Type: Experimental aircraft
- National origin: United Kingdom
- Manufacturer: Short Brothers
- Designer: Horace Short
- Number built: 1

History
- Introduction date: 1910
- First flight: 1910

The Short No.3 Biplane was an early British aircraft built by Short Brothers in the late 1900s.

== History ==
The Short No.3 biplane was a follow-on to the company's earlier Short Biplane No.2. The aircraft was ordered by Royal Navy officer Frank McClean on August 3, 1909, and delivered in mid-1910. Although the wingspan is known, the exact configuration and powerplant arrangement are unknown. However, even before completion and flight-testing, the No.3 biplane was judged to be obsolete.

== Specifications ==
General characteristics

- Crew: one
- Wingspan: 30 ft 0 in (9.14 m)

Performance
