= Short Brothers =

Aerospace manufacturer in Northern Ireland

Short Brothers plc
- Industry: Aerospace
- Founded: Battersea, 1908
- Fate: Acquired by Spirit AeroSystems
- Headquarters: Belfast, Northern Ireland
- Key people: David Keith-Lucas
- Revenue: £810 million (2006)
- Operating income: £69 million (2006)
- Net income: £48 million
- Number of employees: 5,330

Short Brothers plc, usually referred to as Shorts or Short, was an aerospace company based in Belfast, Northern Ireland. Since December 8, 2025, the facility is known as Short Brothers - A Boeing Company. Shorts was founded in 1908 in London, and was the first company in the world to make production aeroplanes. It was particularly notable for its flying boat designs manufactured into the 1950s.

In 1943, Shorts was nationalised and later denationalised, and in 1948 moved from its main base at Rochester, Kent, to Belfast. In the 1960s, Shorts mainly produced turboprop airliners, major components for aerospace primary manufacturers, and missiles for the British Armed Forces.

Shorts was primarily government-owned until being bought by Bombardier in 1989 and, in 2007, was the largest manufacturing concern in Northern Ireland. In November 2020, Bombardier sold its Belfast operations to Spirit AeroSystems. Following a deal to split Spirit Aerosystems' assets, Boeing became the main owner of the Belfast site in December 2025; production facilities relating to Airbus aircraft are leased out to Airbus.

The company's products include aircraft components, engine nacelles and aircraft flight control systems for Bombardier Aerospace, Boeing, Rolls-Royce Deutschland, General Electric and Pratt & Whitney.

== History ==
=== Early years ===
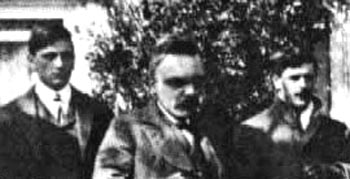
Left to right: Oswald (1883–1969), Horace (1872–1917), and Eustace Short (1875–1932) at Mussell Manor 1909

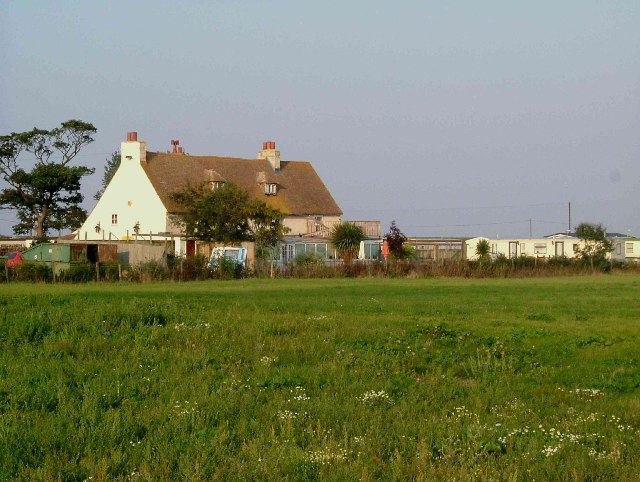
Muswell Manor, the Royal Aero Club clubhouse

The Short Brothers business started in 1897 when Eustace Short (1875–1932) bought a second-hand coal gas filled balloon, and, with his brother Oswald, started a company to develop and manufacture balloons. In 1900, the two brothers visited the 1900 Paris Exposition ('World's Fair'), where they saw the balloons of Édouard Surcouf (of Société Astra), who had developed a method of constructing truly spherical balloons.

In 1902, the brothers started offering balloons for sale. They manufactured the balloons at Hove, Sussex, in premises above the acoustic laboratory run by a third brother, Horace (2 July 1872 – 6 April 1917). In 1903, when Horace left to work on steam turbine development with Charles Parsons, Eustace and Oswald moved their workshop to rented accommodation in London, then again to railway arches in Battersea, conveniently situated next to Battersea gas-works.

In 1905, they won a contract for three balloons for the British Indian Army. The quality of their work impressed Colonel James Templer, superintendent of the Royal Balloon Factory, who introduced the brothers to Charles Rolls. Rolls commissioned them to build him a large balloon to compete in the 1906 Gordon Bennett Cup balloon race. More orders soon followed from other members of the Aero Club of Great Britain (later Royal Aero Club).

In 1908, on hearing reports from Aero Club members who had seen the Wright brothers' demonstrations of their aircraft at Le Mans in France, Oswald Short reportedly said to Eustace, "This is the finish of ballooning: we must begin building aeroplanes at once, and we can't do that without Horace!" Oswald succeeded in persuading Horace to leave his job with Parsons, and in November 1908 they registered their partnership under the name Short Brothers. Two orders for aircraft were soon received, one from Charles Rolls, who ordered a glider, and the other from Francis McClean, a member of the Aero Club who later bought several more aircraft from Short Brothers, and also acted as an unpaid test-pilot. At the end of 1908 Horace started work on the two designs, and in early 1909 construction was started of McClean's aircraft, the Short No.1 biplane. In March 1909 it was exhibited, without its fabric covering, at the first British Aero Show held at Olympia. The brothers had obtained the British rights to build copies of the Wright design.

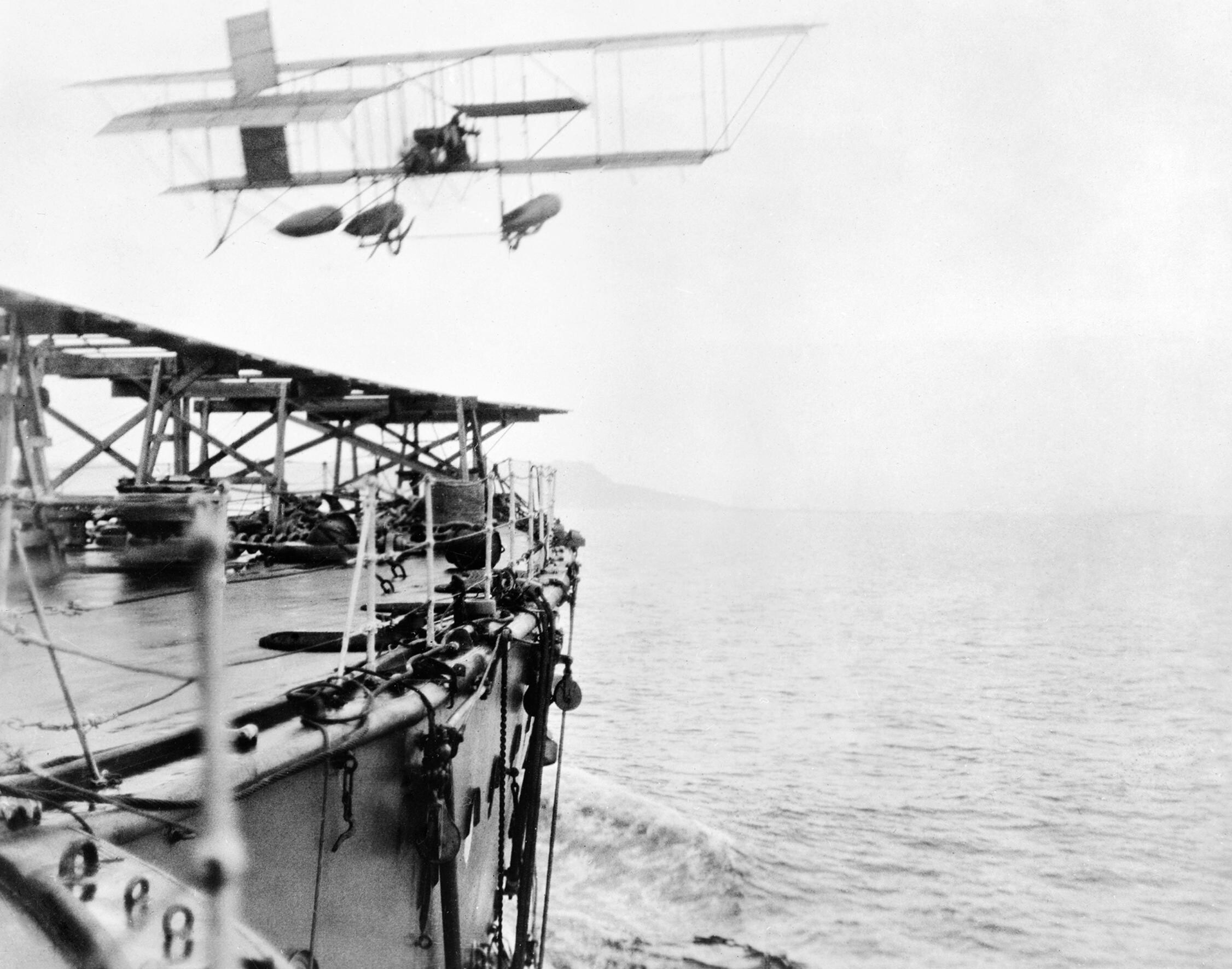
Commander C. R. Samson making the first take-off from a moving ship, May 1912

In February 1909, Shorts started construction of a new workshop on unobstructed marshland at Leysdown, near Shellbeach on the Isle of Sheppey. This had been acquired by the Aero Club for use as a flying ground, together with Mussell Manor (now known as "Muswell Manor"), which became its clubhouse. Construction of an initial batch of six aircraft was started immediately. Short Brothers thus became the first aircraft manufacturing company in the world to undertake volume production of an aircraft design. Here the Dunne D.5, the first tailless aircraft, was also built under contract. In 1910 the Royal Aero Club and Short Brothers moved to a larger and less marshy ground at Eastchurch, about 2.5 mi (4.0 km) away. At this time the Royal Aero Club had offered the Admiralty the use of the flying field and Frank McClean had agreed to act as an instructor, so beginning a close association between Short Brothers and the Naval Air Service, whose first pilots were trained using Short S.27 pusher biplanes.

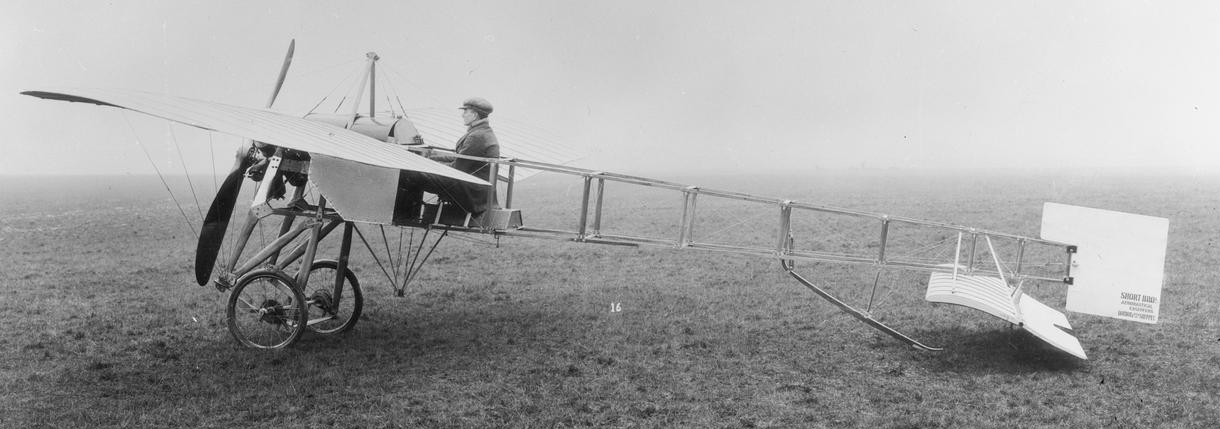
Short monoplane. Short Brothers first attempt at a monoplane, 1911

In 1911, Shorts built one of the world's first successful twin-engine aircraft, the Triple Twin. Construction started on a long series of naval aircraft floatplanes, starting with the Short S.26. In 1913, Gordon Bell became Shorts' first professional test pilot: he was succeeded by Ronald Kemp in 1914. Kemp could not handle the volume of flight testing and development alone and, by 1916, other pilots were employed on a freelance basis. One of these was John Lankester Parker. In 1918 Parker succeeded Kemp as Shorts' Chief Test Pilot, a post he was to occupy for the next 27 years. In 2013 a statue of the brothers was unveiled in memory of their contribution to early aviation, by local artist Barbara Street to stand on the site of the Aero Club clubhouse at Muswell manor.

=== First World War ===
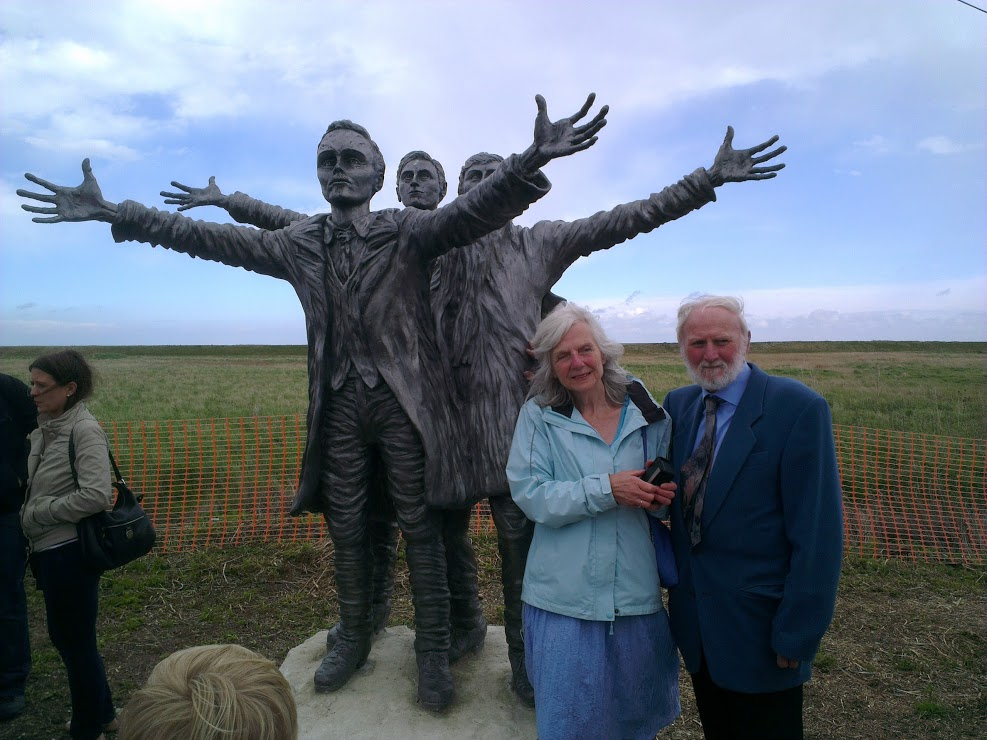
Short Brothers Statue at the site of their aero club (Musswell Manor, Isle of Sheppey)

By the outbreak of World War I Shorts were already building a variety of aircraft. Production really started to expand during the war, for example for the Short Admiralty Type 184 (or simply "Short S.184"). On 15 August 1915, during the Battle of Gallipoli, a Short S.184 was the first aircraft to attack a ship with a live torpedo. Flying from HMS Ben-my-Chree, piloted by Flight Commander Charles Edmonds, it hit a Turkish supply ship in the Dardanelles. In terms of number built, the S.184 was Shorts' most successful pre-Second World War aircraft: over 900 were produced, many under licence by other manufacturers. A landplane version of the S.184 was also sold to the Royal Flying Corps as the Short Bomber.

During the First World War, Shorts were among the manufacturers of two flying boats, the F.3 and F.5, designed by John Porte at the Seaplane Experimental Station, Felixstowe. When the war ended, some 50 of these were being built at Rochester.

==== Expansion at Rochester ====
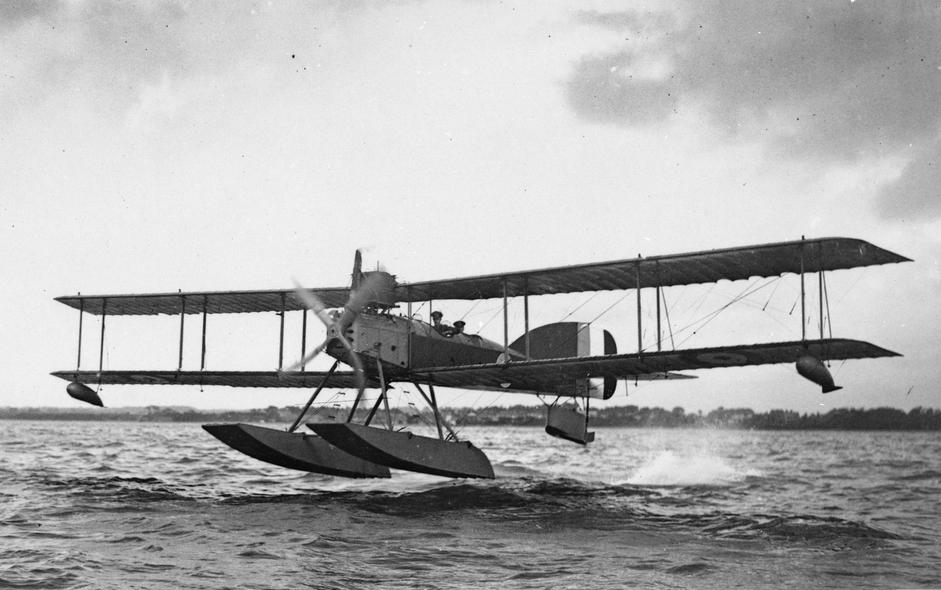
Short 184 floatplane

Due to the company's success, and the increasing number of seaplanes being produced, larger premises with ready access to the sea were needed. At that time, seaplanes were taken by road to Queenborough, then loaded onto lighters to be taken to the RNAS seaplane station on Isle of Grain to be launched and tested. In 1913, an 8.4 acre (3.4 hectare) plot of land by the river Medway about 20 miles (32 km) away at Borstal, near Rochester, Kent, was purchased from Charles Willis (a local councillor), and the planning and construction work started. By early 1915, the first facility of what was to become known as the Seaplane Works was completed: No.1 Erecting Shop. As this and the No.2 and No.3 shops became available, the workforce moved from the Eastchurch factory. No.3 shop was completed in 1917. A long concrete slipway was constructed from the centre-line of No.3 Erecting Shop to enable aircraft of up to 20 tons weight to be launched even at low tide.

==== Airships at Cardington ====
In 1916, Short Brothers was awarded a contract to build two large dirigible airships for the Admiralty. As part of the contract, a loan was provided to enable the company to purchase a site near Cardington, Bedfordshire, on which to build airship construction facilities. As a result, the company concentrated on the construction of heavier-than-air aeroplanes in the Isle of Sheppey/Rochester area, and balloons and dirigibles at Cardington. A housing estate built by the company near Cardington to house its employees still bears the name Shortstown. In 1919, the name of the company was changed to Short Brothers (Rochester and Bedford) Ltd., but nationalisation the same year ended the Short brothers' involvement with the company, which became the Royal Airship Works.

=== 1920s and 1930s ===
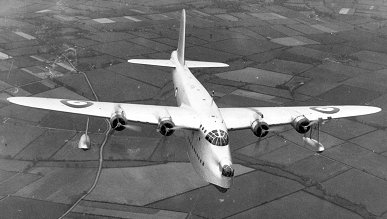
Short Sunderland, operated by the RAF and Commonwealth during the Second World War

During the immediate post-war years the economic climate was difficult for the aircraft industry in the United Kingdom. Shorts survived without reducing the company's workforce by diversifying into areas such as building lightweight bus and tram bodies. During the 1920s and 1930s, flying boats were favoured for long-range civil aviation, because their operation did not rely on the existence of suitable airfields, which were not widespread at the time. Shorts took to the flying boat market, and in 1924 constructed a 350 ft (110 m) testing tank for testing hull and float designs. Shorts designed the floats used for the Supermarine S.4 and Gloster III seaplanes entered by the United Kingdom for the 1925 Schneider Trophy race. Alan Cobham's de Havilland DH.50 (G-EBFO) was also fitted with Shorts floats at Rochester. On 30 June 1926, Cobham then started a flight to Australia from the Medway. Two de Havilland Giant Moths were fitted with Shorts floats at Rochester, and the first was flown in June 1928; both were delivered to Western Canada Airlines Ltd.

In 1924, Shorts produced the first of a series of three designs known as the Singapore. In 1927, the Singapore I was used by Sir Alan Cobham, when he, his wife, and crew made a survey of Africa which covered about 23,000 miles. Shorts then started design work on the Short Calcutta, based on the Singapore layout but larger and more powerful, which began service with Imperial Airways in August 1928. By April 1929 two more had been added to the fleet, and they operated passenger-preferred coastal routes from Genoa to Alexandria by way of Athens, Corfu, Naples, and Rome. Several Calcuttas were used on shorter routes, and were instrumental in permitting long-range airline services between outposts of the British Empire. Shorts followed the production of four Calcuttas with the larger Kent, following with a series of still larger aircraft designs such as the Short Empire, the first of which was launched on 2 July 1936. The Empire was commissioned off the drawing board by Imperial Airways (later BOAC), to operate the UK's Empire Airmail scheme.

A year later Shorts won a British government defence contract for the Sunderland military patrol flying boat. Sharing a similar design, but incorporating some aerodynamic and hydrodynamic advances, and a more rounded top of the fuselage that incorporated several gunner's positions. Dreaded by U-boats, it was claimed by the British propaganda people that the Germans called it "The Flying Porcupine" (Fliegendes Stachelschwein in German), although no evidence supports their contention. In 1933, Shorts opened a new factory at Rochester Airport, which was becoming increasingly important for the landplanes the company was producing. The Eastchurch premises was closed in 1934, and in the same year Shorts purchased the engine manufacturer Pobjoy, which had moved to Rochester Airport to be near Shorts and had collaborated on its latest designs.

On 5 July 1937, a Short Empire was used by Imperial Airways for the first westbound transatlantic service from Foynes, Ireland to Newfoundland.

=== First moves to Belfast ===
In 1936, the Air Ministry established a new aircraft factory at Belfast, and created a new company Short & Harland Ltd, owned 50% each by Harland and Wolff and Shorts. The first products of the new factory were 50 Bristol Bombays followed by 150 Handley-Page Hereford bombers.

Shorts work on seaplanes eventually culminated in the Short Sandringham and Short Seaford, both based on the Empire/Sunderland boats. These flying boats had enough range to operate as a transatlantic airliner, but largely served the post-war Empire (Commonwealth) market, in competition with 4-engined land planes such as modified Avro Lancasters, Avro Lancastrian and Avro York.

Tasman Empire Airways Limited (TEAL) operated the Coral Route from New Zealand to Fiji, the Cook Islands and Tahiti in the South Pacific, with Short Solent flying boats up to 1960.

=== Second World War ===
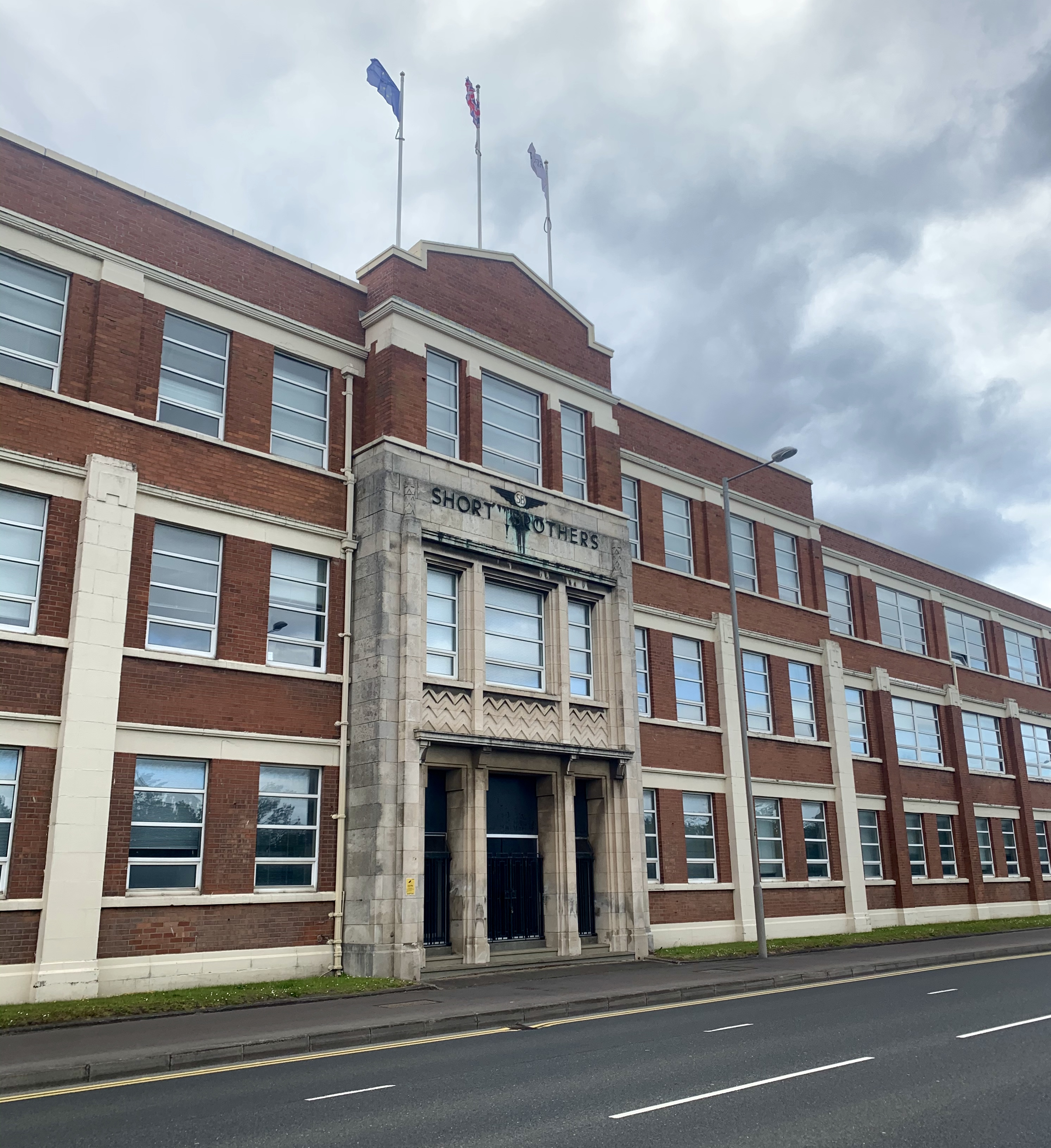
Short Brothers HQ in Belfast, constructed in 1941

During the Battle of Britain, the Rochester factory was heavily bombed by the Luftwaffe, and several Stirlings and other aircraft were destroyed, and during Easter week of 1941, Belfast and the aircraft factory were subjected to the worst single air-raid the UK had seen outside London. To prevent raids from limiting production, satellite factories near Belfast were operated at Aldergrove and Maghaberry, producing 232 Stirlings between them. Underground tunnels were created at Rochester that housed production of components such as engine gauges, and compasses. A temporary Short's factory was established at White Cross Bay, Windermere, that produced 35 Sunderland Mark IIIs. Austin Motors at Longbridge, Birmingham also produced over 600 Stirlings, and Blackburn Aircraft produced 240 Sunderlands at its shadow factory in Dumbarton, Scotland.

During the Second World War, the Short Sunderland was an effective anti-submarine patrol bomber operated by RAF Coastal Command in the Battle of the Atlantic, the Mediterranean, in Asia and the south Pacific because of its availability, endurance and weapon load. It also carried out air-sea rescue operations. In the absence of sufficient Sunderlands, Australia impressed Qantas-Imperial Short Empire flying boats into military service, and used these successfully especially on reconnaissance missions in the Timor Sea area.

A much enlarged transatlantic development of the Empire, the S.26 G-Class was developed, but only three completed before the war resulted in further production being cancelled.

Short's work on the Sunderland also won it the contract for the Short Stirling four-engine bomber-transport for the RAF. This was essentially a land-based Sunderland, however its use of a now outdated thick-section, low aspect ratio wing to facilitate it going into service quickly limited climb and ceiling, and design decisions, such as the use of cells for individual bombs limited its long term usefulness as a heavy bomber when it proved incapable of carrying the newer larger bombs that didn't fit in the cells. As it was intended as a stopgap pending the delivery of the Handley Page Halifax and Avro Manchester bombers, it followed the RAF tradition of also being a transport aircraft, with a cabin useful for troops and cargo, in which role it was used once the Halifax and Avro Lancaster were available in large enough numbers. Attempts by Shorts to sell improved versions to the RAF were ignored, not least over concerns regarding Oswald's leadership and alcoholism.

In 1944, the Short Shetland, a high-speed, long-range, four-engined flying-boat, was built (with Saunders-Roe providing the wings and detail design work), but the project was abandoned shortly after the end of the war, however conversions and developments of the Sunderland entered service as transports, starting during the war with the Hythe, which was a demilitarised Sunderland with the turrets faired over, then the post-war Sandringham, which refined the shape to eliminate the turret mountings, and finally by the definitive Solent, with an enlarged tail and more powerful engines and other refinements derived from the stillborn wartime Seaford, which was to have been the penultimate Sunderland development.

In 1943, the Government nationalised Short's under Defence Regulation 78. Oswald Short, who had resigned as Chairman in January of that year, remained as Honorary Life President.

=== Postwar ===
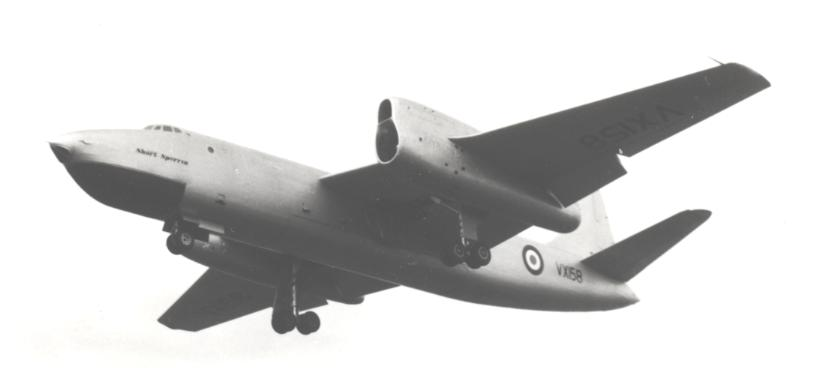
Short Sperrin Gyron test bed (lower port engine) at Farnborough SBAC Airshow, September 1955

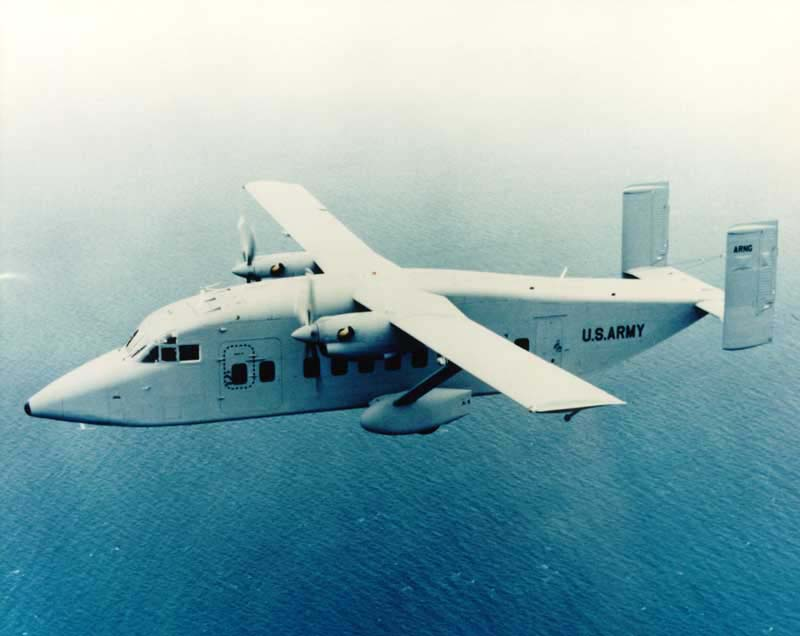
US military version of the Shorts 330, the company's most successful modern aircraft after the Shorts 360

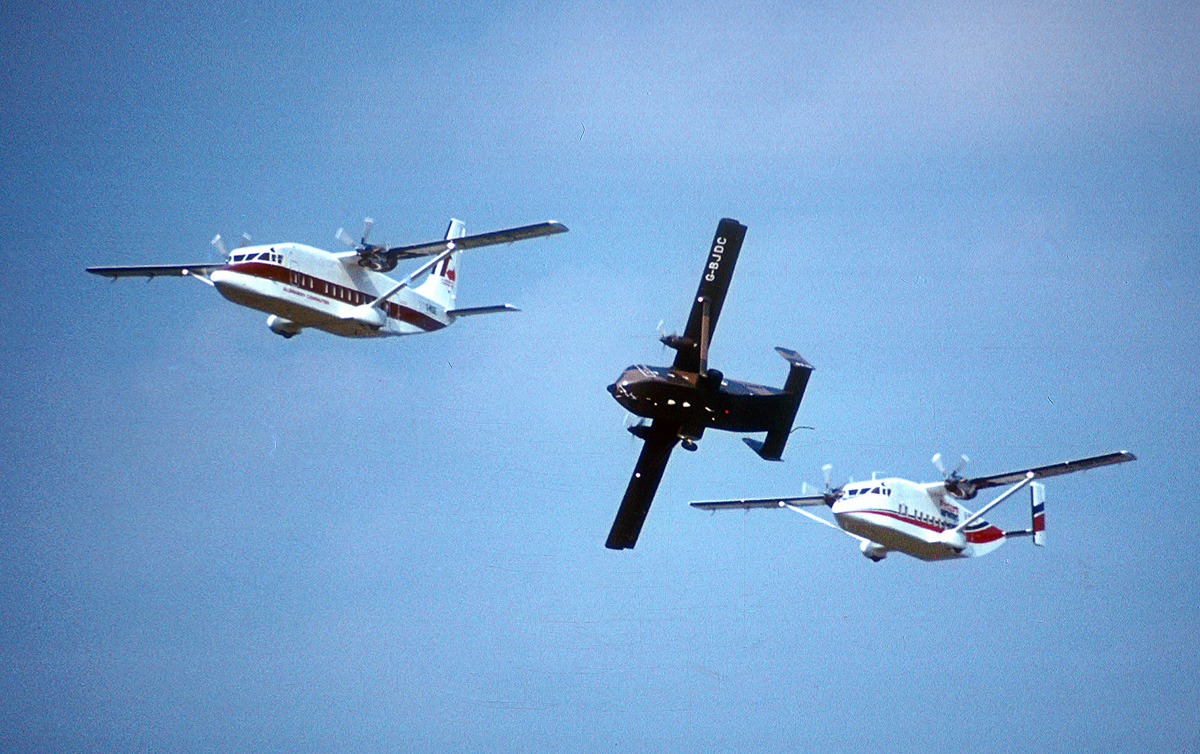
A Short 360, Short Skyvan and Short 330 at the 1982 Farnborough Airshow.

The cancelled Short FJX regional jet

By 1947, all of Shorts other wartime factories had been closed, and operations concentrated in Belfast. In 1948, the company offices followed, and Shorts became a Belfast company in its entirety. In the meantime, in 1947, Short Brothers (Rochester and Bedford) Ltd. had merged with Short and Harland Limited to become Short Brothers and Harland Limited, with Oswald Short remaining as Life President.

In the 1950s, Shorts was involved in much pioneering research, including designing and building the VTOL Short SC1, the Short SB5 and the Short SB.4 Sherpa. Shorts built the Short Sperrin, a backup jet engine bomber design in case the V bomber projects failed, and the Short Seamew, a cheap-to-produce anti-submarine reconnaissance and attack aircraft intended for the Royal Navy Volunteer Reserve squadrons, but the Sperrin was not needed and the RNVR squadrons disbanded. In the 1950s, Shorts also received sub-contracts to build 150 English Electric Canberras, and on 30 October 1952, the first of those made its maiden flight. Of these types, Shorts delivered 60 Canberra B.2s, 49 Canberra B.6s and 23 Canberra P.R.9s, the remaining 18 being cancelled by the Government in 1957. Further work was involved in the conversion of time-expired Canberra B.2s into unmanned radio-controlled missile target aircraft. Two prototypes and 10 production Canberra U.10s were produced, followed by six improved Canberra U.14s. These aircraft were controlled from the ground by VHF radio, and were equipped to provide feedback on their own performance, as well as that of the missiles aimed at them. As early as 1953, Shorts became involved with pioneering the development of electronic analogue computers, to assist with the design of increasingly complex aircraft.

In 1954, the Bristol Aeroplane Company became a 15.25% shareholder in Shorts, and the company used the injection of funds to set up a production line for the Bristol Britannia turbo-prop airliner, known in the press as The Whispering Giant. Although it was originally intended that 35 Britannias should be built by Shorts, a shortage of work at Bristol led to this number being reduced. Eventually, 15 Britannias were completed by Shorts; five sets of Britannia components were sent to Filton and used on the continued production there of Britannias.

In the 1960s, Shorts found a niche for a new short-haul freighter aircraft and responded with the Short SC.7 Skyvan. The Skyvan is most remembered for its box-like, slab-sided appearance and rectangular twin tail units, but the aircraft was well loved for its performance and loading. It served almost the same performance niche as the de Havilland Twin Otter, and the Skyvan proved more popular in the freighter market due to the large rear cargo door that allowed it to handle bulky loads with ease. Skyvans can still be found around the world today.

The heavy lift freighter Short SC.5 Belfast flew for the first time in 1964. Only 10 were built for the Royal Air Force. In the 1970s, Shorts entered the feederliner market with the Shorts 330, a stretched modification of the Skyvan, called the C-23 Sherpa in USAF service, and another stretch resulted in the more streamlined Shorts 360, in which a more conventional central fin superseded the older H-profiled twin fins.

In 1988, the proposed development was announced of a regional jet seating 44 passengers and to be called the FJX. The aircraft would have been a competitor to the Bombardier CRJ100 that was also in development at the time, but the FJX was cancelled after Short Brothers' sale to Bombardier.

=== Loyalist paramilitaries ===
In 1987 loyalists working at Shorts erected loyalist flags and bunting to intimidate the Catholic workers. The loyalist workers went on strike after management removed the loyalist flags from the shop floor.

In April 1989, three Northern Irish men, Noel Little, Samuel Quinn and James King, were arrested in Paris and later convicted of "arms trafficking and associating with criminals involved in terrorist activities." They were accused of having stolen missile parts and documents related to Shorts' products. Also arrested were arms dealer Douglas Bernhardt and a South African diplomat.

In 1993 a Catholic sub-contractor at Shorts was shot dead and five others injured in a loyalist attack on a mini-bus full of Catholic workmen in an attack to discourage Catholics from taking jobs at Shorts.

=== Belfast City Airport ===
In 1937, Shorts established an airfield in central Belfast, beside the factory. This became Sydenham Airport and, from 1938 to 1939, was Belfast's main civilian airport. During the Second World War, the airfield was requisitioned by the Royal Navy. Shorts continued to use the airfield until production of complete aircraft ceased, despite Nutts Corner, a former RAF base, becoming Belfast's main airport (Nutts Corner was itself superseded in 1963 by Aldergrove). In 1983, following interest from airlines and customers, the airfield was opened for commercial flights as Belfast Harbour Airport (later Belfast City Airport (BCA), now George Best Belfast City Airport). Following major capital investment, Bombardier sold BCA for £35 million in 2003.

=== Bombardier ===
In 1977, the company changed its name back to Short Brothers, and in 1984 it became a public limited company in preparation for privatisation. The government announced the sale of Shorts to Bombardier on 7 June 1989 for £30 million. As part of the sale, the government agreed at the insistence of Chancellor John Major to write off £390 million of the company's accumulated losses and inject another £390 million to recapitalise the group and cover current and future losses, capital investment and training. Bombardier beat a bid from General Electric Company and Fokker. Messerschmitt-Bölkow-Blohm had withdrawn before final offers were submitted. The sale was finalised on 4 October 1989.

In 1993, with the company under the chairmanship of Roy McNulty, Bombardier Shorts and Thomson-CSF formed a joint venture, Shorts Missile Systems, for the design and development of very short-range, air defence missiles for the UK Ministry of Defence and armed forces worldwide using expertise dating back to the 1950s. In 2000, Thomson-CSF bought Bombardier's 50% share to become the sole owner of Shorts Missile Systems, renaming it Thales Air Defence in 2001.

=== Spirit AeroSystems ===
On 31 October 2019, Bombardier announced the sale of its aerostructures activities to Spirit AeroSystems. The sale closed in November 2020 following regulatory approval and a renegotiated price due to the effect of the COVID-19 pandemic. In 2024, Boeing and Airbus agreed to split Spirit Aerosystems' assets.

=== Short Brothers - A Boeing Company ===
On December 8, 2025, Spirit Aerosystems was acquired by Boeing, and the Belfast site started operating as an independent subsidiary branded as Short Brothers, a Boeing Company. Boeing took on 2400 of the site's 3500 staff. The portion of the site handling activities for Airbus aircraft is leased to Airbus, and the corresponding staff hired by Airbus. The Short Brothers - A Boeing Company now make aerostructures including primary structures, flight controls, nacelles and thrust reversers as well as structure for military defense systems and they also perform Maintenance, Repair, and Overhaul (MRO) of aircraft.

== Legacy ==
In 2025, the Short brothers were honoured as aviation pioneers with a Blue Plaque in St Ann's Well Gardens, Hove.

== Aircraft ==
Year of first flight in parentheses. Some of the early aircraft are designated using the Short sequence or constructors number which should not be confused with the similar type designations started at S.1 in 1924. Since becoming part of Bombardier Aerospace in 1989, focus is aerospace components rather than individual aircraft models, missiles or drones.

=== 1900–1909 ===
- Short Biplane No. 1
- Short Biplane No. 2 (1909)
- Short Biplane No. 3

=== 1910–1919 ===
- Avro 504K licence production at Belfast by Harland and Wolff
- De Havilland DH.6 licence production at Belfast by Harland and Wolff
- De Havilland DH.9 licence production at Rochester
- Dunne D.5 (1910)
- Short S.27 (1910)
- Short Tandem-Twin (1911, 2 × rotary engines for F. McClean)
- Short S.34 (Long range S.27)
- Short S.36 (1912)
- Short S.38 (1912)
- Short S.39 Triple-Twin (1911)
- Short S.41 (1912)
- Short S.42 monoplane
- Short S.45 (1912)
- Short S.46 (1912) Twin-engined tractor/pusher monoplane, nicknamed the Double Dirty
- Short S.47 Triple-Tractor (1912, 2 × 50 hp rotary driving tractor propellers)
- Short Folder (1913 ff.)- generic name applied to a number of different types.
- Short Admiralty Type 3 - Final rebuild of the Tandem Twin, similar to a Type S.38, one only.
- Short Admiralty Type 42
- Short Admiralty Type 74
- Short Admiralty Type 81 (1913) folding-wing tractor floatplane.
- Short S.80 The Nile pusher floatplane.
- Short S.81 (1913) experimental pusher gun-carrier.
- Short Admiralty Type 135 (1914) 1-off folding-wing floatplane
- Short Admiralty Type 136 (1914) 1-off folding-wing floatplane
- Short Admiralty Type 166 (1914)
- Short Admiralty Type 184 (1915)
- Short Bomber (1915)
- Short Type 827 (1914)
- Short Type 830 (1914)
- Short 310 (1916)
- Short Type 320 (1916)
- Short F.3 Felixstowe (1917)
- Short F.5 Felixstowe (1918)
- Short N.1B Shirl (1918)
- Short N.2A (1917)
- Short N.2B (1917)
- R31 (airship) (1918)
- Short Sporting Type (1919)

=== 1920–1929 ===
- Short Silver Streak (1920)
- Short N.3 Cromarty (1921)
- Gnosspelius Gull (1923)
- Short S.1 Cockle (1924)
- Short S.2 (1924)
- Short S.3 Springbok (1923)
- Short S.3a Springbok (1925)
- Short S.3b Chamois (1927)
- Short S.4 Satellite (1924)
- Short S.5 Singapore I (1925)
- Short S.6 Sturgeon (1927) (Biplane)
- Short S.7 Mussel (1926)
- Short S.8 Calcutta (1928)
- Short S.10 Gurnard (1929)
- Short Crusader (1927)

=== 1930–1939 ===
- Short S.8/8 Rangoon (1930)
- Short S.11 Valetta (1930)
- Short S.12 Singapore II (1930)
- Short S.17 Kent (1931)
- Short S.14 Sarafand (1932) (originally known as the Short R6/28)
- Short-Kawanishi S.15 KF1
- Short S.16 Scion/Scion II (1933)
- Short S.18 Knuckleduster (1933)
- Short L.17 Scylla (1934)
- Short S.19 Singapore III (1934)
- Short S.20 Mercury (1937 Short Mayo Composite)
- Short S.21 Maia (1937 Short Mayo Composite)
- Short S.22 Scion Senior (1935)
- Short S.23 Empire Flying Boat (1936)
- Short S.25 Sunderland (1937)
- Short S.25 Sandringham (a post-war derivation of the Sunderland)
- Short S.26 G-Class (1939)
- Short S.27 Civet - project - not built (1936)
- Short S.30 Empire Flying Boat (1938)
- Short S.31 (Half-scale Stirling) (1938)
- Short S.32
- Short S.29 Stirling (1939)
- Bristol Bombay (1939) licence production
- Handley Page Hereford licence production

=== 1940–1949 ===
- Short S.33 Empire Flying Boat (1940)
- Short S.35 Shetland 1 (1944)
- Short S.45 Seaford (1944)
- Short S.45 Solent (1946)
- Short S.38 SA1 Sturgeon (1946)
- Short S.39 SA2 Sturgeon
- Short Nimbus (1947)
- Short S.40 Shetland 2 (1947)
- Short S.41 (1946) - Design proposal for a naval fighter to specification N.7/46. No built.
- Short SB3 Sturgeon
- Short SA6 Sealand (1948)

=== 1950–1959 ===
- Short S.42 SA4 Sperrin (1951)
- Short S.43 SA5 (project only)
- Short S.48 SA9 (glider - project only)
- Short SB1 (1951)
- Short SB5 (1952)
- Short SB.4 Sherpa (1953)
- Short SB6 Seamew (1953)
- Short SB7 Sealand III
- Short SC1 (1957)
- English Electric Canberra sub-contract
- Bristol Britannia sub-contract

=== 1960–1989 ===
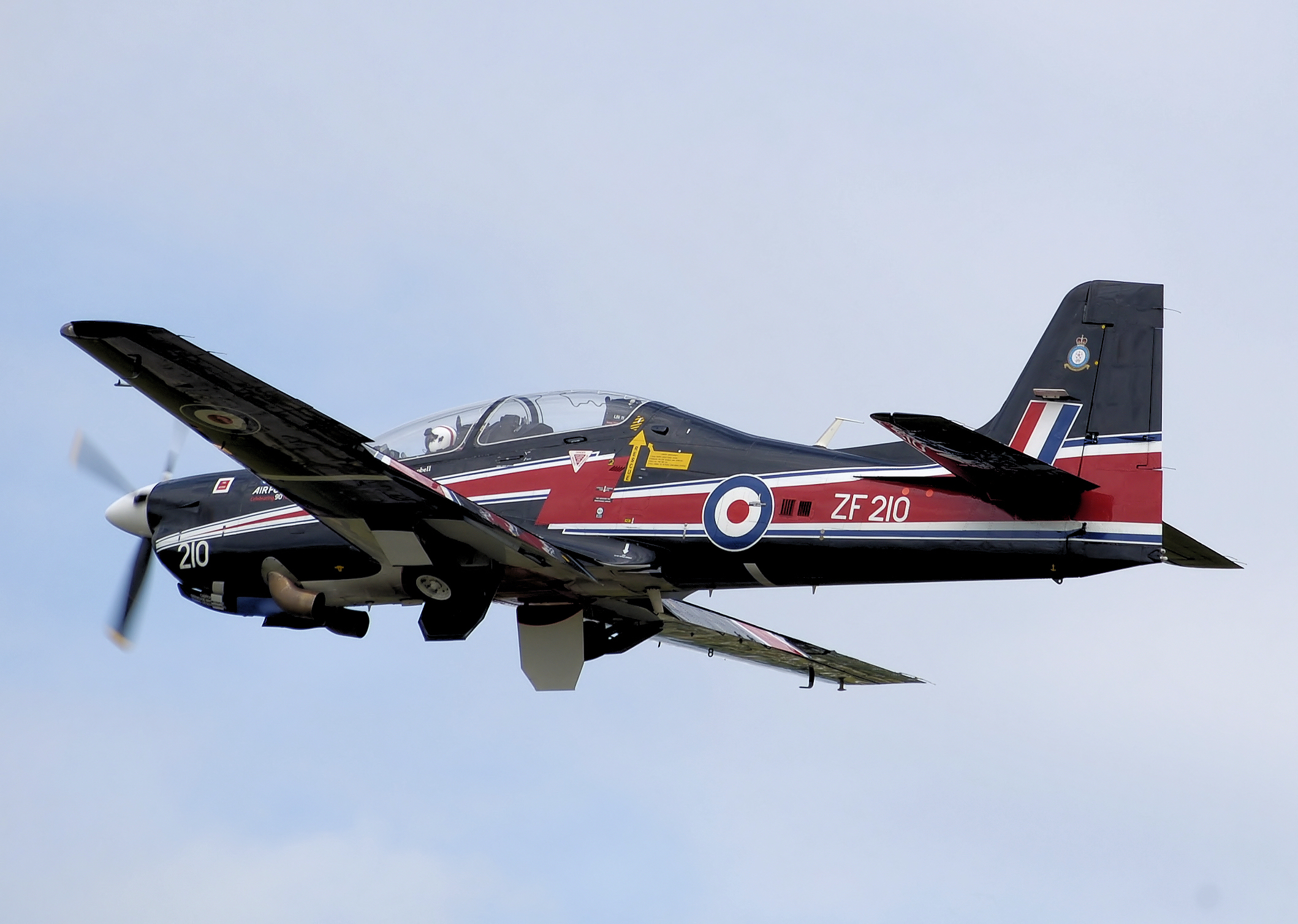
Royal Air Force Short 312 Tucano in special colours as the RAF's 2008 display aircraft

- Short SC9 Canberra (1961)
- Short SD1 Canberra (1961)
- Short SC7 Skyvan (1963)
- Short SC5 Belfast (1964)
- Short 330 (1974)
- Short 360 (1981)
- Short C-23 Sherpa (1985)
- Short 312 Tucano (1986, last aircraft design prior to becoming part of Bombardier Aerospace in 1989)

=== Airships ===
- R31-class airship Two built; R31 and R32 (1918)
- R38 (ZR-2) (1921)

=== Missiles ===
Shorts' missile division, which evolved into Shorts Missile Systems (1993–2000, then sold), produced surface-to-air missiles.

Year of first use by a military in parentheses.

- Seacat – shipboard short-range surface-to-air missile (1962)
- Tigercat – land-based, trailer-mounted version of Seacat (1967)
- Blowpipe – soldier portable (1975)
- Javelin – soldier portable (post-Blowpipe, pre-Starburst)
- Starburst – soldier portable (1989)
- Starstreak – soldier portable (1997)

=== Rotorcraft ===
- Cierva C.14

=== UAVs and drones ===
Test and trial programs from the 1960s and 1970s.

- Shorts MATS-B
- Shorts Skeet
- Short Skyspy
- Shorts SD.2 Stiletto - The Stiletto was the American AQM-37 Jayhawk target drone, built under licence in the United Kingdom. (Launched from Short SD1 Canberra)

== Chief test pilots ==
- Francis McClean (honorary) until 1912
- Gordon Bell 1912–1914
- Sydney Pickles 1913 (Acting CTP during Bell's absence following a crash at Brooklands)
- Ronald C. Kemp 1914–1918
- John Lankester Parker 1918–1945
- Geoffrey Dyson 1945–1946
- Harold Piper 1946–1948
- Tom Brooke-Smith 1948–1960
- Denis Tayler 1960–1969
- Donald Burn Wright 1969–1976
- Lindsay Cummings
- Allan Deacon
- Graham Andrews
- Jack Eaton 1984–present

== Armoured vehicles ==
- Shorland Armoured Car
- Shorland S600

== See also ==
- Aerospace industry in the United Kingdom
- Canadair
- de Havilland Canada
- Learjet
- Bombardier Aerospace
- Oswald Short
