= Short Valetta =

1930s British passenger monoplane

S.11 Valetta
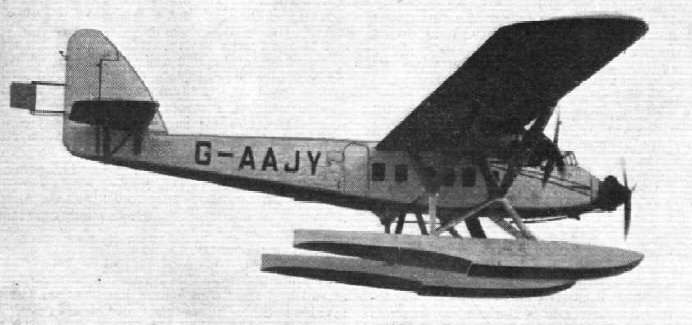

General information
- Type: Passenger monoplane
- National origin: United Kingdom
- Manufacturer: Short Brothers
- Number built: 1

History
- First flight: 21 May 1930

The Short S.11 Valetta was a 1930s British passenger monoplane designed and built by Short Brothers at Rochester.

== Development ==
The Valetta was designed and built for the Air Ministry to enable comparisons between a floatplane/landplane and a flying boat. The Valetta was a monoplane powered by three Bristol Jupiter XIF engines and first flown on 21 May 1930 as a floatplane. It had room for two crew and 16 passengers. In July 1931 it left Rochester on an African survey flight flown by Sir Alan Cobham, it returned to Rochester in September 1931 after flying 12,300 miles. The aircraft last flew as a floatplane in November 1931 and was converted to a landplane. It then underwent trials with Imperial Airways and the Air Ministry before being withdrawn from use and used by the Royal Air Force as an instructional aircraft at RAF Halton.

== Short Valetta (Floatplane) ==
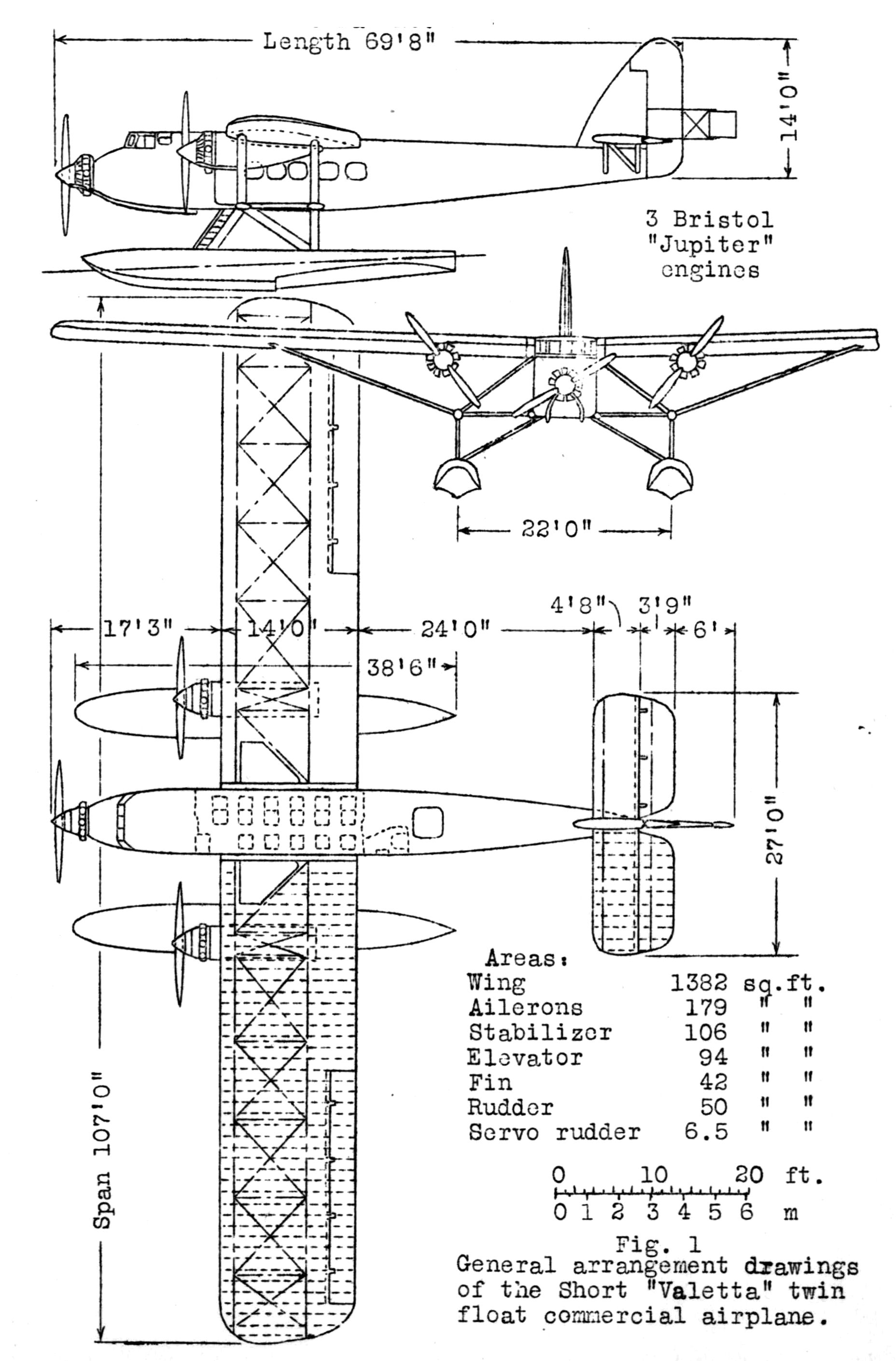
Short Valetta 3-view drawing from NACA Aircraft Circular No.125

Data from Jackson, A.J. and Flight

General characteristics

- Crew: two
- Capacity: 16 passengers
- Length: 70 ft 5 in (21.47 m)
- Wingspan: 107 ft 0 in (32.62 m)
- Width: 27 ft 0 in (8.23 m)
- Height: 14 ft 0 in (4.28 m)
- Wing area: 1,382 sq ft (128.39 m^{2})
- Empty weight: 14,535 lb (6,593 kg)
- Gross weight: 22,400 lb (10,180 kg)
- Powerplant: 3 × Bristol Jupiter XIF , 525 hp (392 kW) each

Performance

- Maximum speed: 135 mph (217 km/h, 117 kn)
- Cruise speed: 105–110 mph (168–177 km/h, 91–96 kn)
- Range: 520 mi (835 km, 450 nmi)
- Service ceiling: 16,000 ft (4,877 m)
- Rate of climb: 850 ft/min (4.32 m/s)

== Short Valetta (landplane) ==
Data from Jackson, A.J. and Flight

General characteristics

- Crew: two
- Capacity: 16 passengers
- Length: 70 ft 5 in (21.47 m)
- Wingspan: 107 ft 0 in (32.62 m)
- Width: 27 ft 0 in (8.23 m)
- Height: 14 ft 0 in (4.28 m)
- Wing area: 1,382 sq ft (128.39 m^{2})
- Empty weight: 14,535 lb (6,593 kg)
- Gross weight: 21,850 lb (9,940 kg)
- Powerplant: 3 × Bristol Jupiter XIF , 525 hp (392 kW) each

Performance

- Maximum speed: 138 mph (222 km/h, 120 kn)
- Cruise speed: 105–110 mph (168–177 km/h, 91–96 kn)
- Range: 520 mi (835 km, 450 nmi)
- Service ceiling: 14,800 ft (4,511 m)
- Rate of climb: 880 ft/min (4.47 m/s)

== See also ==
Related lists

- List of flying boats and floatplanes
