= Shavrov Sh-5 =

Sh-5

General information
- Type: Aerial mapping amphibian flying-boat
- National origin: Soviet Union
- Manufacturer: Shavrov
- Designer: Vadim Borisovich Shavrov
- Number built: 1

History
- First flight: 19 March 1934

The Shavrov Sh-5 was a Soviet civil amphibian flying-boat designed by Vadim Borisovich Shavrov as a photographic platform for aerial mapping. By the time it flew it was an outdated design and the type did not enter production.

== Design and development ==
A special committee convened to investigate the use of special aircraft for photographic survey concluded that it was desirable. To fulfil the requirements Shavrov designed the Sh-5 amphibian as a large aircraft designed to carry cameras aa well as all the equipment and crew to develop and print the images. The committee envisaged two versions; the FS-1 landlplane and the FS-2 flying boat, (FS - Foto Samolyet – Photographic aircraft), the latter requirement was fulfilled by the Sh-5 amphibian as built in the former Richard OKB factory, GAZ-28 (GAZ - Gosudarstvenny Aviatsionnyy Zavod – state aviation plant/factory).

The Sh-5 was a cantilever high-wing monoplane amphibian flying-boat. Designed as a camera platform with glazed cabin areas it could also carry 12 passengers. It was powered by two 480 hp (358 kW) Shvetsov M-22 engines, (developed from license built Gnome-Rhône GR9ASB / Bristol Jupiter VI), mounted in nacelles, supported by struts, above the wing roots. It had a boat shaped fuselage bottom with a retractable landing gear and outrigger floats. Although the design work started in 1929 construction was slow, the prototype fitted with a skid landing gear first flew on 19 March 1934. With the use of military aircraft, particularly the Tupolev R-6 for aerial mapping and the fact it had become an outdated design by the time it had first flown meant the type did not enter production.

== Variants ==
FS-1
Landplane version, not built.
FS-2
Flying boat version, not built
Sh-5
The amphibious aircraft designed by Shavrov and built at GAZ-29 to fulfil both roles. The sole prototype was in flight test when a main undercarriage strut failed. The aircraft was not repaired and later scrapped.

== Specifications (Sh-5) ==
Data from

General characteristics

- Crew: Flight crew + 12 passengers / survey crew
- Length: 15 m (49 ft 3 in)
- Wingspan: 24 m (78 ft 9 in)
- Wing area: 73.1 m^{2} (787 sq ft)
- Airfoil: MOS-27 16%
- Empty weight: 3,470 kg (7,650 lb) (FS-1 landplane 3,150 kg (6,945 lb)
- Gross weight: 5,000 kg (11,023 lb)
- Fuel capacity: 500 kg (1,102 lb) fuel and oil, (FS-1 landplane 800 kg (1,764 lb)
- Powerplant: 2 × Shvetsov M-22 9-cyl air-cooled radial piston engines, 360 kW (480 hp) each
- Propellers: 2-bladed bladed ground adjustable metal propellers

Performance

- Maximum speed: 213 km/h (132 mph, 115 kn)
- Range: 800 km (500 mi, 430 nmi) (FS-1 landplane 500 km (311 mi))
- Service ceiling: 4,900 m (16,100 ft)
- Time to altitude: 1,000 m (3,281 ft) in 5 minutes
- Take-off distance: - 250 m (820 ft) / 16 seconds
- Landing distance: - 240 m (787 ft) at 80 km/h (50 mph)

== See also ==
Related lists

- List of flying boats and floatplanes
