= Short Satellite =

Satellite
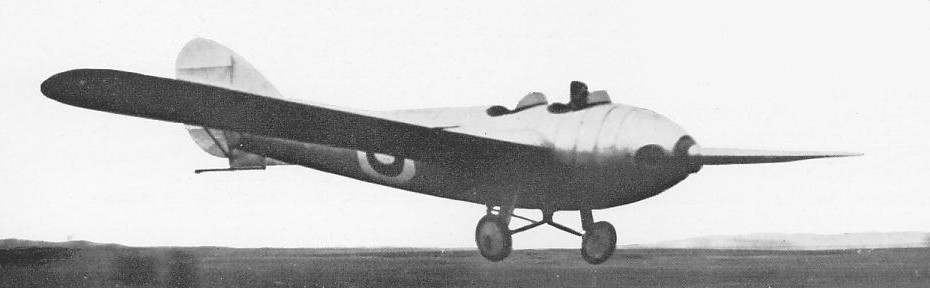

General information
- Type: two-seat monoplane
- Manufacturer: Short Brothers
- Primary user: Short Brothers
- Number built: 1

History
- Introduction date: 1924
- First flight: 10 September 1924
- Retired: 1926

The Short S.4 Satellite was a small British two-seater sporting monoplane, produced in 1924 to take part in the Air Ministry's Two-Seater Light Aeroplane competition on 27 September of that year.

== Design ==
Design began in July, with only weeks available before the competition, so the monocoque fuselage was of conventional design, with wooden box spars; the ribs however were of duralumin, as were the tailplane, elevators, fin and rudder. The cantilever wings had a span of 34 ft (10.3 m) and they, the tail and the fuselage were fabric-covered. The Satellite was fitted initially with an ungeared Bristol Cherub engine, with which it had a top speed of 70 mph (110 km/h) without a passenger.

== History ==
The aircraft was initially fitted with an ungeared Bristol Cherub engine at the Air Ministry's Two-Seater Light Aeroplane competition at Lympne in 1924, where the Satellite was flown by the company's chief test pilot J. Lankester Parker. The engine delivered insufficient power to fly with a passenger, so the Satellite, along with nine of the other 18 entrants, failed to meet the competition's success criteria. It was fitted with a tuned version of the Cherub within the week and on 4 October took part in the Grosvenor Cup race, completing the course and finishing in seventh place. It was later fitted with a geared Cherub II, later still with an ABC Motors Scorpion Mk. II engine, both of which greatly improved its performance. As a result of violent wing flutter experienced at 90 mph (140 km/h), the wingspan was reduced by 2 ft (0.61 m); this solved the problem and no flutter was experienced even at dives of up to 120 mph.

The Satellite was sometimes irreverently referred to as "Parker's Tin Kettle" because he frequently flew the aircraft.

== Specifications ==
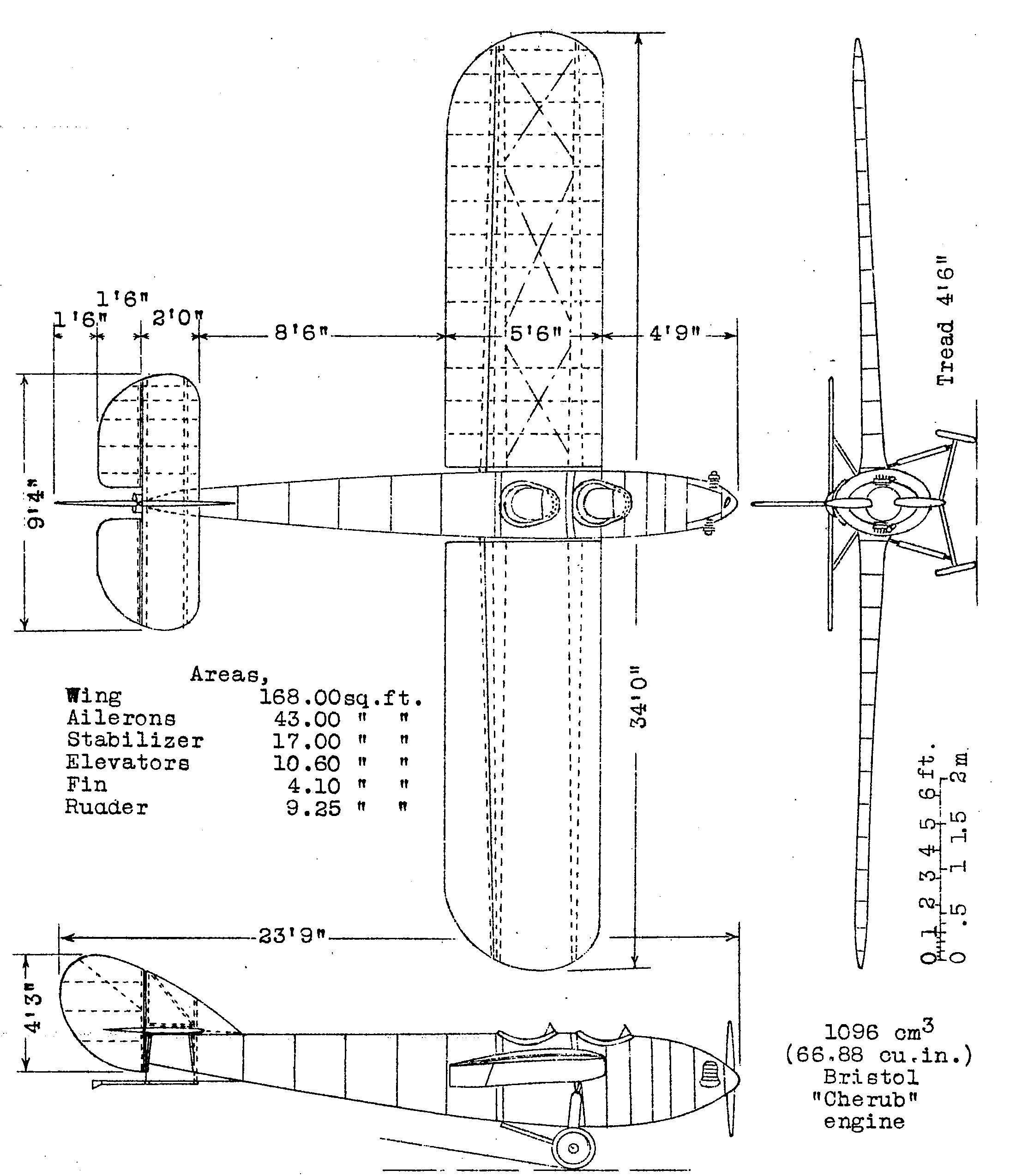
Short Satellite 3-view drawing from NACA-TM-289

Data from

General characteristics

- Crew: one
- Capacity: one
- Length: 23 ft 9 in (7.24 m)
- Wingspan: 33 ft 10 in (10.3 m)
- Wing area: 168 sq ft (15.6 m^{2})
- Empty weight: 640 lb (290 kg)
- Gross weight: 1,060 lb (481 kg)
- Powerplant: 1 × Bristol Cherub 2-cyl. air-cooled horizontally-opposed piston-engine, 33 hp (25 kW)

Performance

- Maximum speed: 72 mph (116 km/h, 63 kn)
