= Shavrov Sh-3 =

General information
- Type: Light transport amphibian aircraft
- National origin: Soviet Union
- Manufacturer: Shavrov
- Status: Project abandoned 1936
- Number built: 1 (90% complete)

The Shavrov Sh-3 was a Soviet project for a single-engined light amphibious aircraft designed by Vadim Shavrov for the transport role. The programme was abandoned as the prototype was nearing completion.

== Specifications ==
General characteristics

- Length: 7.80 m (36 ft 7 in)
- Wingspan: 14.00 m (46 ft 11 in)
- Wing area: 24 m^{2} (258.33 sq ft)
- Empty weight: 720 kg (1,587 lb)
- Gross weight: 1,070 kg (2,359 lb)
- Powerplant: 1 × Cirrus Hermes , 89 kW (120 hp)

== See also ==
Related lists

- List of flying boats and floatplanes
