= Short No.1 biplane =

Short No.1
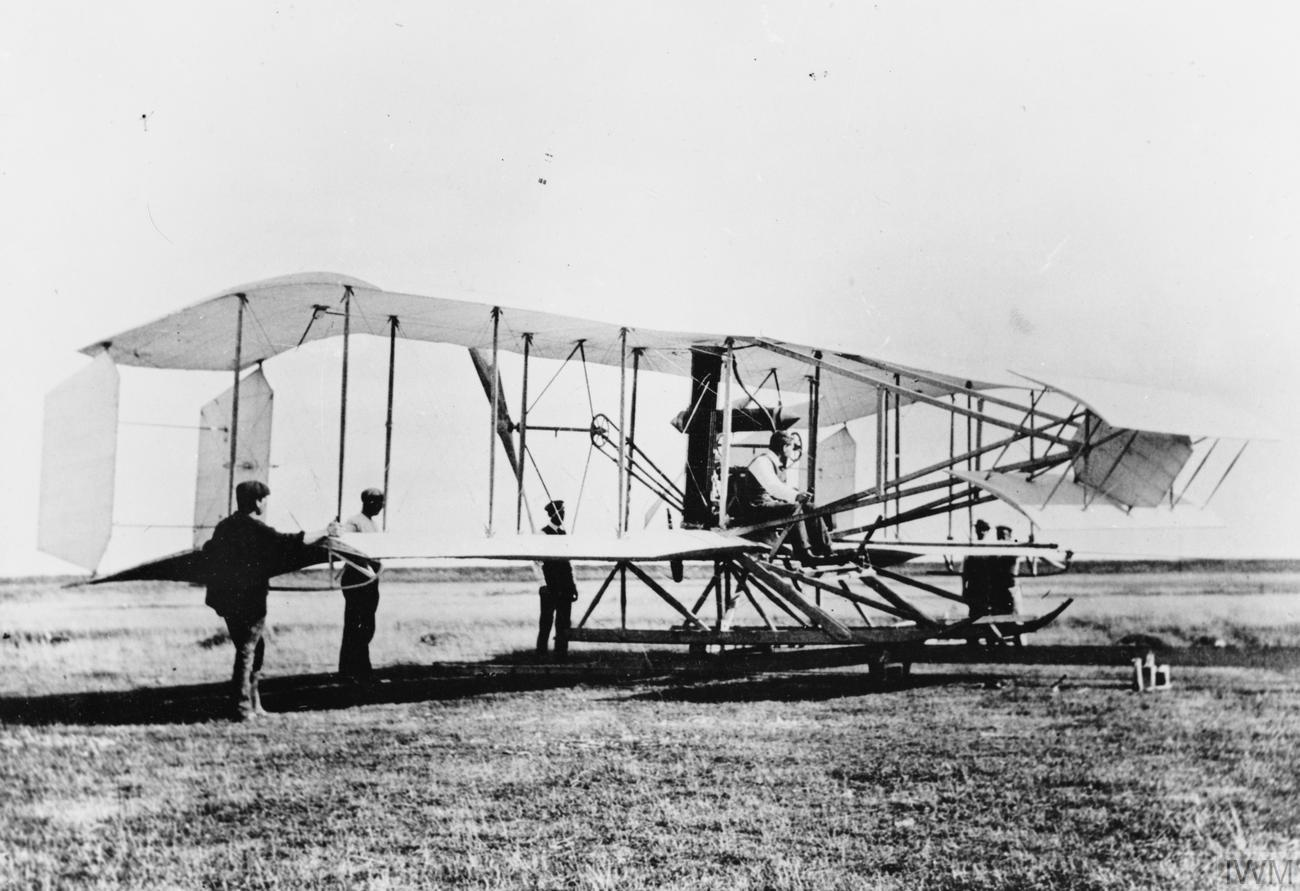

General information
- Type: Experimental aircraft
- National origin: United Kingdom
- Manufacturer: Short Brothers
- Designer: Horace Short
- Number built: 1

History
- Introduction date: 1909

The Short No.1 biplane was an early British aircraft built in 1909 by Short Brothers. Although it never flew, it was notable for being the first aircraft designed by Horace Short.

== Design and development ==
The Short No.1 was built for Francis McClean, who had seen Wilbur Wright's flight demonstrations at Le Mans in France. McClean, a keen astronomer, had to leave on an expedition to observe a solar eclipse in China, but wrote to Horace Short, whom he had only met once, asking him to build him an aeroplane. Horace Short began design work in November 1908, and construction of the aircraft was started at Short Brothers' Battersea workshop in early 1909. The uncovered airframe was exhibited in March at the 1909 London Aero Show at Olympia.

The aircraft was a three-bay biplane with a biplane elevator and central fin mounted on two pairs of converging booms in front. The chord of the outer bay of each wing was extended aft to form flexible extensions to effect lateral control: between the tips of these extensions, four balanced rudders were pivoted. The undercarriage consisted of a pair of ash skids extending forward, almost as far as the elevators. No wheels were fitted, as it was intended to use a launching rail for takeoff. Apart from the skids, the entire airframe was built of spruce, and was covered with Continental brand rubberised fabric. The engine, originally intended to be a version of the Wright's vertical 4-cylinder engine made by Bariquand et Marre, drove a pair of pusher propellers, mounted slightly above mid-gap using a chain drive. This was arranged so that both propellers revolved in the same direction, since crossing them to make them revolve in opposite directions might have infringed patents held by the Wright brothers.

Work continued at the newly established Short Brothers works on the Isle of Sheppey, and was complete upon McClean's return from China. The Bariquand et Marre engine was not yet available, so a 30 hp (22 kW) engine taken from a Nordenfelt car was installed. However, at more than 600 lb (270 kg) in weight, when a first attempt at flight was made in September, the engine failed to propel the machine even as far as the end of the launching rail. The Bariquand et Marre engine arrived in October, and McClean made three attempts at flight on 2, 3 and 6 November, almost succeeding in becoming airborne, but on the last attempt he applied full up-elevator, and the machine stalled and fell back on the launch rail, breaking the undercarriage and propellers: it was not repaired. McClean's next aircraft was a copy of the Wright Model A built under license by Short Brothers.

== Specifications ==
Data from Barnes 1967, p.43

General characteristics

- Crew: one
- Length: 24 ft 7 in (7.49 m)
- Wingspan: 40 ft (12 m)
- Wing area: 576 sq ft (53.5 m^{2})
- Gross weight: 1,200 lb (544 kg)
- Powerplant: 1 × Bariquand et Marre 4-cylinder inline water-cooled, 30 hp (22 kW)
- Propellers: 2-bladed laminated spruce made by Shorts, 10 ft (3.0 m) diameter
