= Short Cockle =

S.1 Cockle
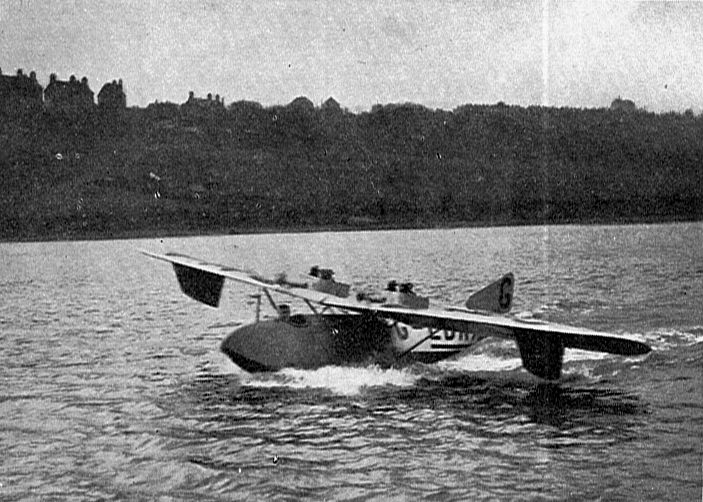
- Cockle on the River Medway, Rochester in 1924 - original fin

General information
- Type: Sport flying boat
- National origin: United Kingdom
- Manufacturer: Short Brothers
- Number built: 1

History
- First flight: 7 November 1924

The Short S.1 Cockle was a single-seat sport monoplane flying boat, with a novel monocoque duralumin hull. It was underpowered and so did not leave the water easily, but it proved that watertight and corrosion-resistant hulls could be built from metal.

== Development ==
From about 1921, Oswald Short had been thinking about the construction of seaplane floats and flying boat hulls made from metal, specifically duralumin, rather than the traditional wood. The latter always suffered from water retention and did not last well in the tropics. He assembled a team, including C. P. T. Liscomb who had extensive experience with that alloy to look into the hydrodynamics and corrosion characteristics of such hulls, and by 1924 was looking out for an opportunity to apply their results. It came with an Australian order for an aircraft suitable for fishing trips around Botany Bay, which Short proposed should be a small flying boat. It was named the Stellite and was the first aircraft to have a Short's design index number, S.1. When it was built and registered as G-EBKA the Air Ministry objected to the name on the reasonable grounds that the Short Stellite might well be confused with the Short Satellite, built at much the same time; it was therefore renamed the Short S.1 Cockle. It was the smallest flying boat ever built at that time. A contemporary source claimed it to be "the first light seaplane to be built [in the United Kingdom] and possibly in the world" and the first British all-metal flying boat.

The Cockle was an all-metal aircraft apart from the fabric-covered flying surfaces. The hull was a duralumin monocoque structure with a concave V-shaped planing bottom incorporating two steps, the main one near the centre of gravity. These steps were external to the monocoque to prevent step damage leading to water leakage into the hull. The top of the hull was rounded, with a single-seat open cockpit near the nose. The wings had steel spars and were mounted on the top of the fuselage, with pairs of bracing struts to the chines. The wings carried full-span ailerons which could be drooped together, flap-like, for landing. There were stabilising floats near the wingtips in trouser-like fairings. The two engines were mounted on top of the wing at about mid-chord, the twin-bladed propellers being driven via long extension shafts to the leading edge. Originally the Cockle had a shallow triangular fin and rudder, but this was later extended upwards to a curved and slightly pointed profile which more than doubled the area, to cope better with single-engine flying. A tube ran transversely across the hull just above the main step, into which the axle of a pair of ground-handling wheels could be inserted.

Deterred from using 32 hp (24 kW) Bristol Cherub flat-twin engines owing to vibration problems, the Cockle began with a pair of V-twin Blackburne Tomtits. Ungeared and so limited to the maximum 2,400 rpm of the propellers, the Tomtits could produce only 16 hp (12 kW). It is not surprising that, when it came to the first flight, the Cockle was underpowered. Before the aircraft was complete the bare hull (always Short's main concern) was floated for a day in April 1924 and found to be satisfactorily watertight. Attempts to get it off the water began in September, but did not succeed until 7 November 1924, with its wing at a higher angle of incidence and its pilot lightly dressed. It has been suggested that it flew only because the atmospheric pressure was exceptionally high that day.

Given the poor performance, it is not surprising that the Australian customer declined delivery. In January 1925 the fin and rudder modifications were made and in March there were unsuccessful attempts to get certification. In July it went on loan to the Air Ministry at Felixstowe, with the serial N193. It was not easy to get into the air, but John Parker, Short's test pilot gave a demonstration in September. Despite the performance limitations, the aircraft impressed because of its corrosion resistance. In August 1926 the Cockle was returned to Short Brothers and re-engined with a pair of geared-down Cherubs. It flew several times in June and July before being purchased by the Air Ministry and returned to Felixstowe. It flew at least one more time, again with Parker as pilot, thereafter being used for corrosion testing.

Though not a successful flyer, the Cockle gave Short Brothers valuable experience in building metal hulls for flying boats. Their first large hull, the Short S.2 metal replacement for the wooden hull of a Felixstowe F5 was started at the same time as that of the Cockle, but the smaller hull progressed faster and the solution to problems encountered with it transferred to the S.2. The S.2 experience led on to the successful Singapore and Short Calcutta of 1926 and 1928.

== Specifications (Cherub) ==
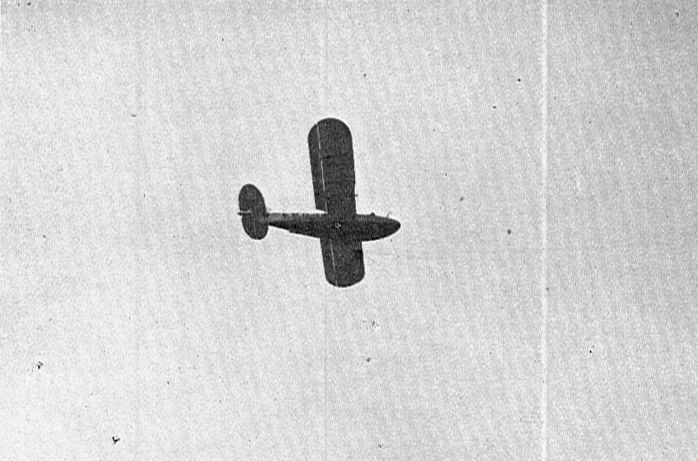

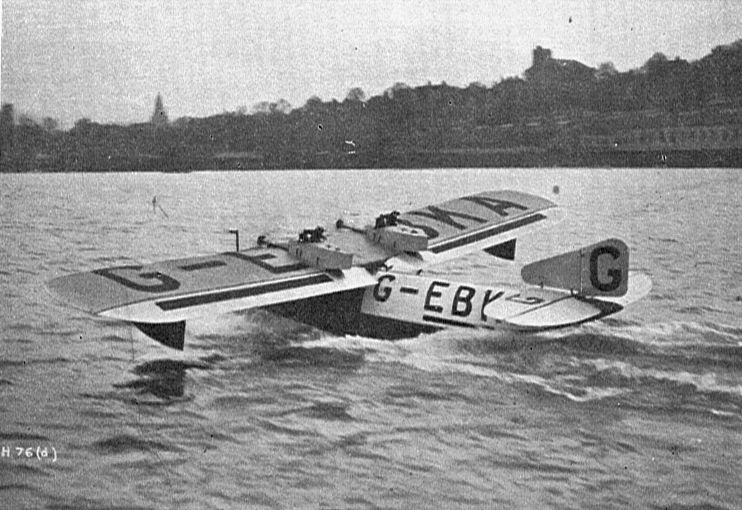
Cockle in 1924 with original fin

Data from

General characteristics

- Crew: one
- Length: 24 ft 8 in (7.52 m)
- Wingspan: 36 ft 0 in (10.97 m)
- Wing area: 210 sq ft (20 m^{2})
- Empty weight: 880 lb (399 kg)
- Gross weight: 1,205 lb (547 kg)
- Powerplant: 2 × Bristol Cherub flat twin, 32 hp (24 kW) each

Performance

- Maximum speed: 73 mph (117 km/h, 63 kn)

== See also ==
Related lists

- Short Mussel
- List of flying boats and floatplanes

== Bibliography ==
- Barnes, C.H. (1989). Shorts Aircraft since 1900. London: Putnam Publishing. ISBN 0-87021-662-7.
- "The Short All-Metal Light Flying Boat: Two 696 c.c. Blackburne Engines". Flight. Vol. XVI, no. 799. 17 April 1924. pp. 220–223.
