= Short S.81 =

S.81
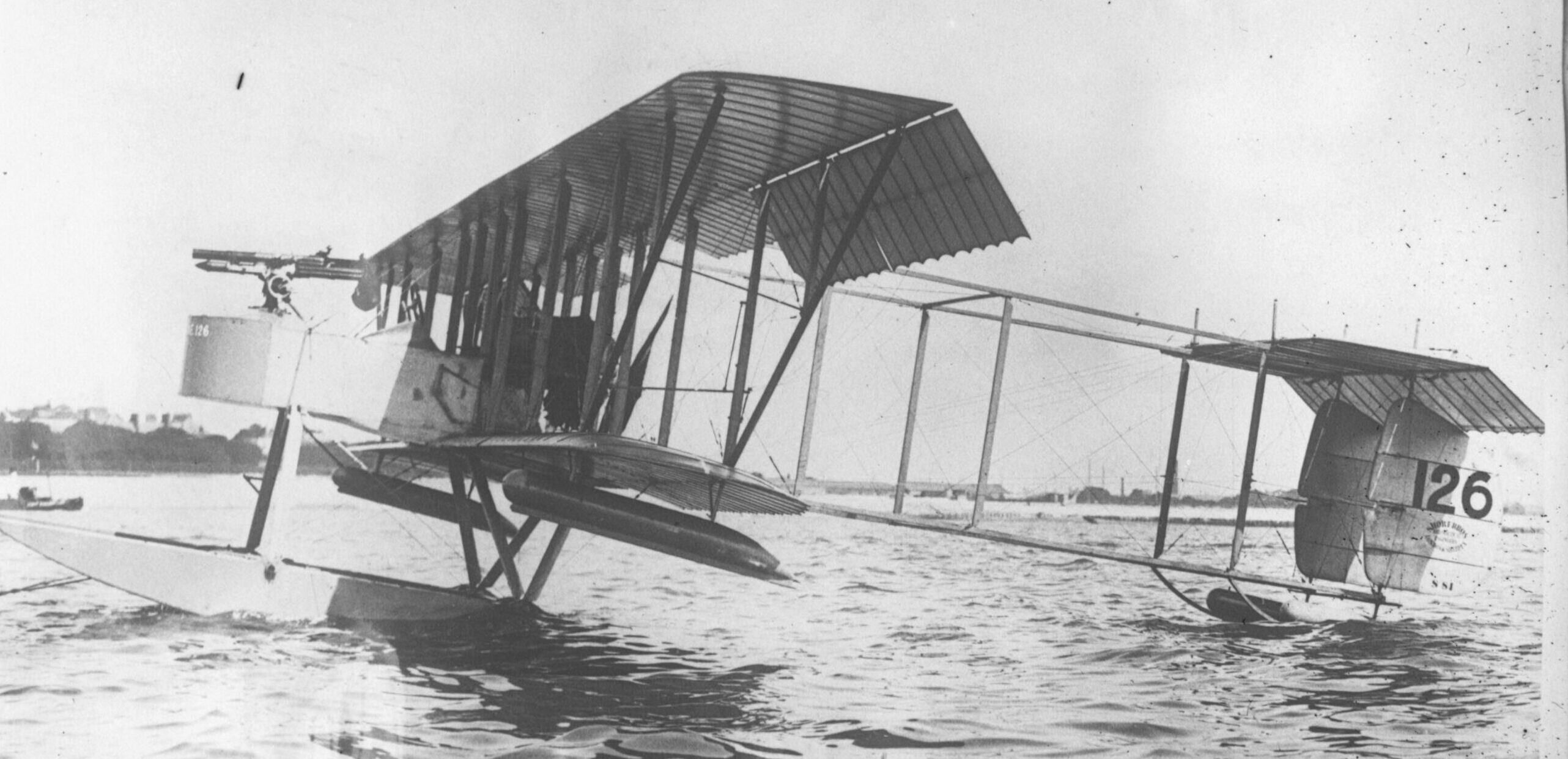

General information
- Type: Gun-carrying Seaplane
- National origin: United Kingdom
- Manufacturer: Short Brothers
- Primary user: Royal Naval Air Service
- Number built: 1

History
- Introduction date: 1914
- First flight: 1914
- Retired: 1915

The Short S.81 was an experimental British gun-carrying pusher biplane seaplane, ordered from Short Brothers by the British Admiralty in 1913 for use by the Royal Naval Air Service.

The seaplane, manufacturers serial number S.81, was built at Eastchurch and allocated the military serial number 126. S.81 was delivered to Calshot on 25 May 1914 and accepted by the Navy on 2 June 1914. It had three-bay wings with overhanging upper wings, and was powered by a 160 hp (119 kW) Gnome rotary engine. It was first fitted with a 1½ pounder (37 mm) semi-automatic Vickers quick-firing gun in July 1914. Tests with this gun showed that recoil was severe, with claims that firing the gun would induce a stall. It was fitted with a number of different guns for trials, testing a six-pounder (57 mm) Davis gun (an early recoilless gun) in 1915. In 1915 it had a dynamo and searchlight fitted. No longer needed for trials, it was deleted from the inventory in October 1915.

== Specifications ==
Data from The British Fighter since 1912

General characteristics

- Crew: two
- Wingspan: 67 ft 0 in (20.42 m)
- Wing area: 540 sq ft (50 m^{2})
- Empty weight: 2,200 lb (998 kg)
- Gross weight: 3,600 lb (1,633 kg)
- Powerplant: 1 × Gnome rotary engine, 160 hp (120 kW)

Performance

- Maximum speed: 60 mph (97 km/h, 52 kn) at sea level

Armament

- Guns: 1 × 1½ pounder Vickers gun

== Operators ==
United Kingdom

- Royal Naval Air Service

== See also ==
Related lists

- List of aircraft of the Royal Naval Air Service
