= Short N.2B =

Prototype British patrol seaplane of the First World War

N.2B

General information
- Type: Reconnaissance aircraft
- National origin: United Kingdom
- Manufacturer: Short Brothers
- Number built: 2

History
- First flight: December 1917

The Short N.2B was a prototype British patrol seaplane of the First World War, designed and built by Short Brothers. A single-engined biplane intended to replace Short's successful Type 184, only two were built, the Fairey III being preferred.

== Development and design ==
In 1917, the British Admiralty released Specification N.2B for a long-range patrol seaplane to replace the Short Type 184 in Royal Naval Air Service (RNAS) service. The Short Brothers' response to this specification, designated Short N.2B was a single-engined, unequal span biplane with two-bay folding wings. While Short's wanted to fit a Rolls-Royce Eagle engine, this was rejected by the Admiralty owing to an expected shortage of these engines, with the Sunbeam Maori substituted.

Eight prototype Short N.2Bs were ordered together with competing aircraft from Fairey (the Fairey III). The first prototype flew in December 1917. When it was tested at the Marine Experimental Aircraft Depot on the Isle of Grain in February 1918, it showed performance no better than the Short 184 with the same engine. While modification with a different propeller and attempts to reduce drag did improve performance, the Fairey III was preferred, being ordered into production in versions powered by both the Maori and Eagle engines, with only the first two prototype Short aircraft being built.

In May 1919, Shorts modified the second prototype with an Eagle engine salvaged from the modified Short N.1B Shirl Shamrock, which had crashed during an attempt to cross the Atlantic, the revised aircraft showing greatly improved climb rate but with speed only increased by 8 mph (13 km/h). The Maori was reinstated, and the second prototype delivered to the Royal Air Force in January 1920.

== Specifications (Maori engine) ==
Data from British Aeroplanes 1914-18

General characteristics

- Crew: two
- Length: 40 ft 2 in (12.24 m)
- Wingspan: 55 ft 2 in (16.81 m)
- Height: 13 ft 9 in (4.19 m)
- Wing area: 678 sq ft (63.0 m^{2})
- Empty weight: 3,280 lb (1,488 kg)
- Gross weight: 4,911 lb (2,228 kg)
- Fuel capacity: 70 imp gal (84 US gal; 320 L)
- Powerplant: 1 × Sunbeam Maori water-cooled V12 engine, 275 hp (205 kW)

Performance

- Maximum speed: 92 mph (148 km/h, 80 kn) at sea level
- Endurance: 4.5 hr
- Service ceiling: 10,600 ft (3,200 m)
- Time to altitude:
  - 4 min 50 s to 2,000 ft (610 m)
  - 40 min 35 s to 10,000 ft (3,050 m)

Armament

- Guns: 1x 0.303 in (7.7 mm) Lewis gun on scarff ring mount on rear cockpit
- Bombs: 2x 230 lb (105 kg) bombs under rear fuselage

== See also ==
Aircraft of comparable role, configuration, and era

- Fairey III

Related lists

- List of aircraft of the Royal Naval Air Service
