= Salmson =

French engineering company

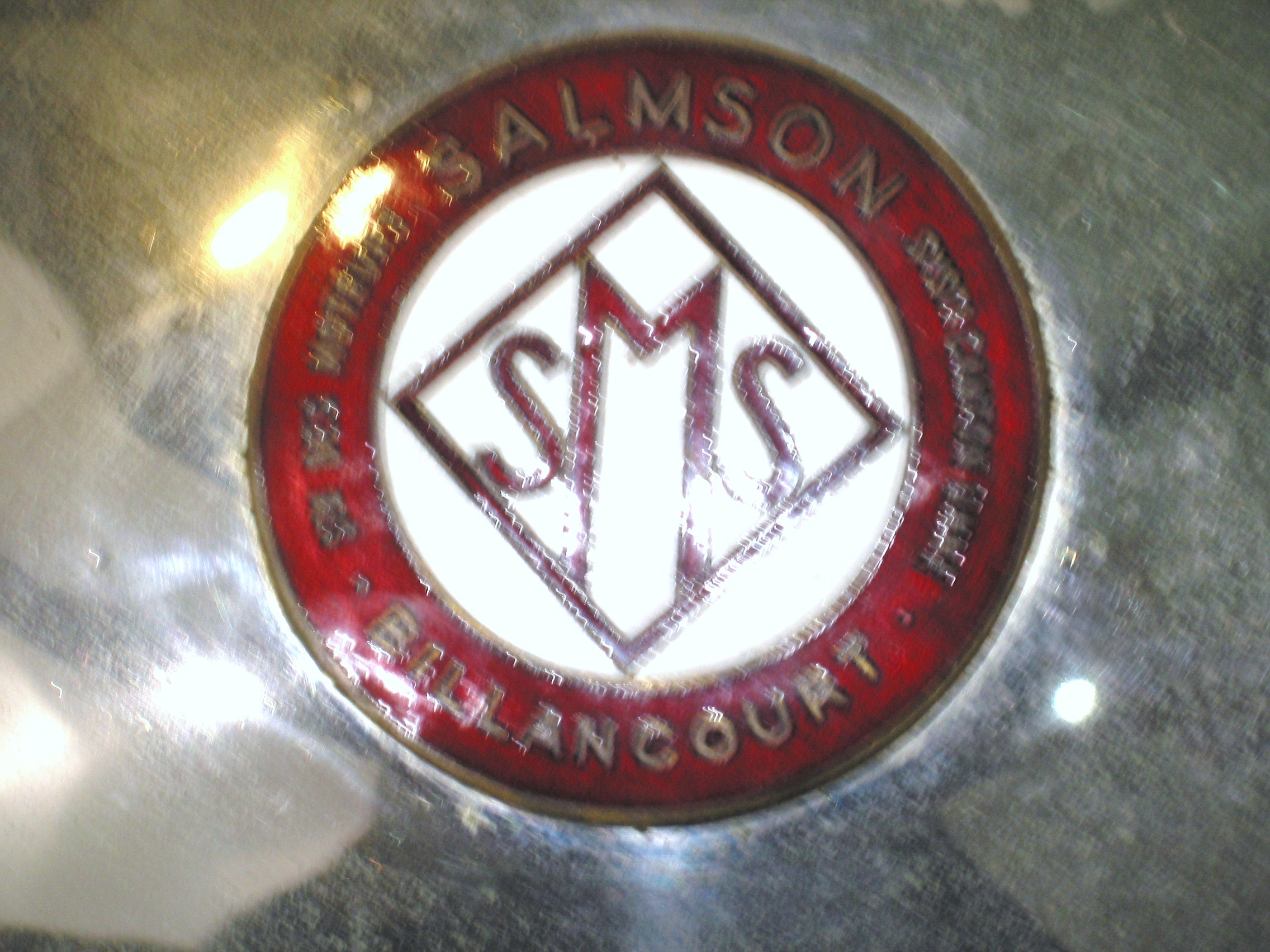
- Industry: Manufacturing
- Founded: 1890
- Founder: Émile Salmson
- Headquarters: Boulogne-Billancourt (France)
- Products: Aircraft; Automobiles

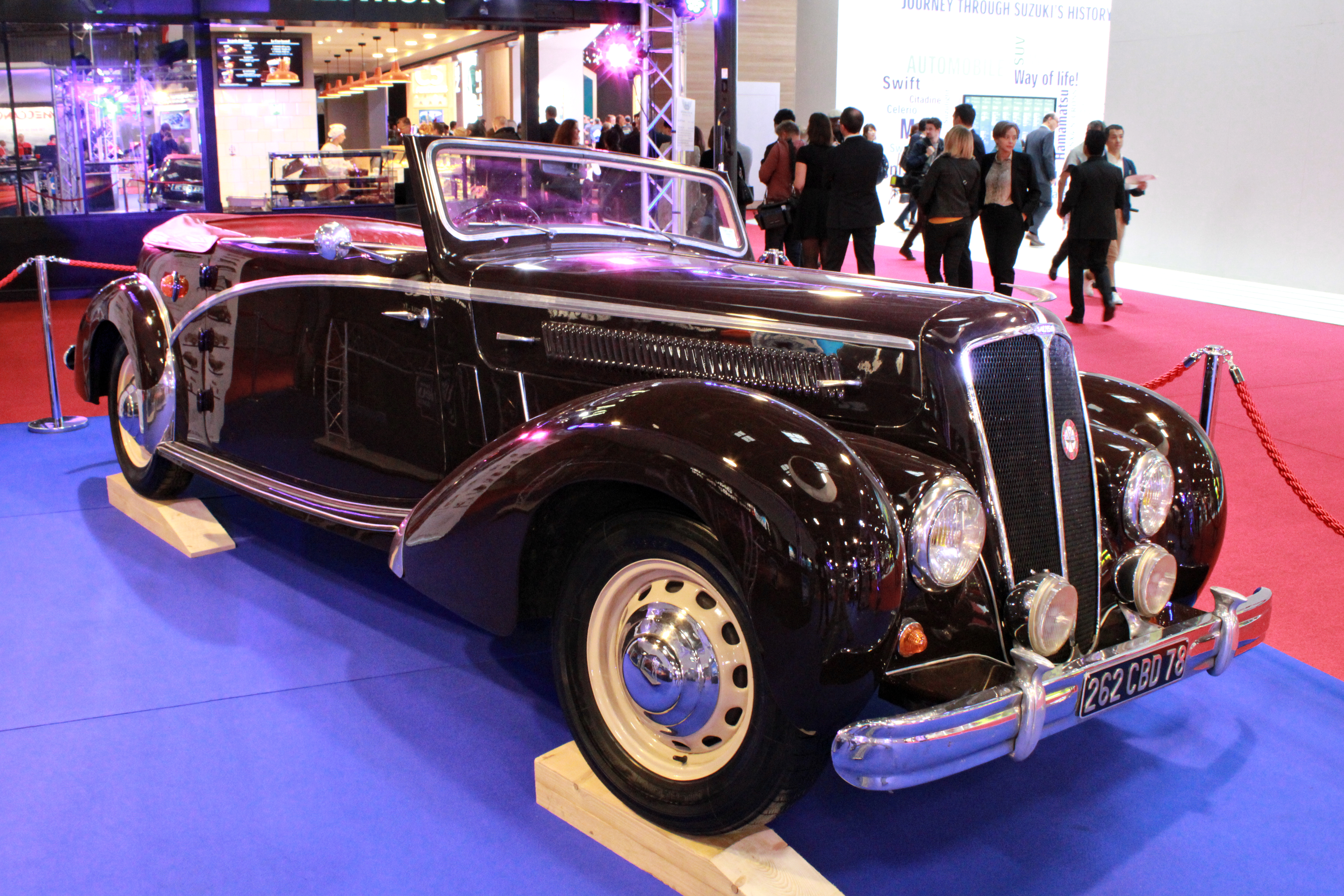
Salmson S4E

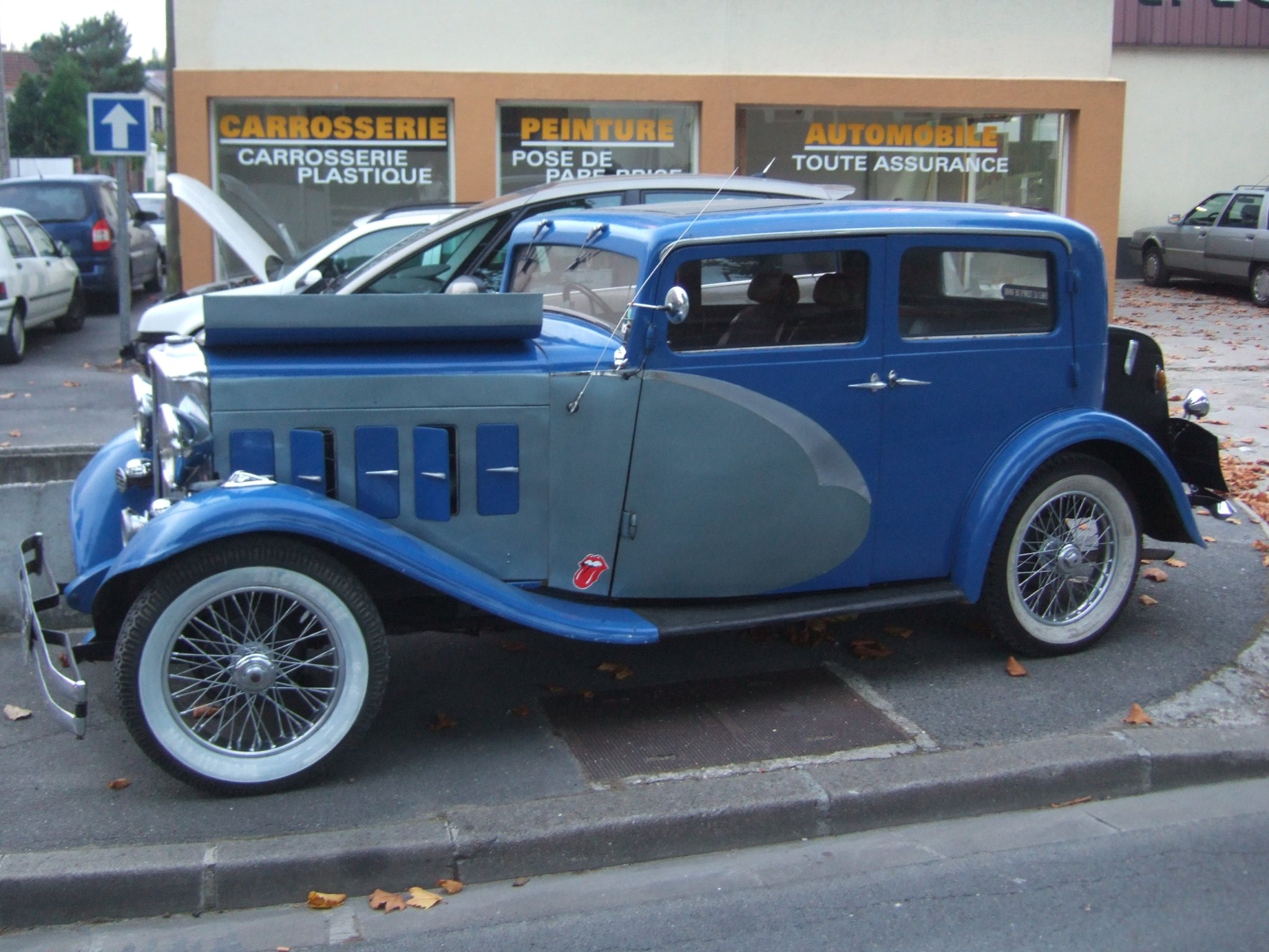
Salmson S4C

Salmson is a French engineering company. Initially a pump manufacturer, it turned to automobile and aeroplane manufacturing in the 20th century, returning to pump manufacturing in the 1960s, and re-expanded to a number of products and services in the late 20th and into the 21st century. It is headquartered in Chatou and has production facilities in Laval. It has subsidiaries in Argentina, Italy, Lebanon, Portugal, South Africa and Vietnam.

== History ==
It was established by Émile Salmson (1858-1917) as Emile Salmson, Ing. as a workshop in Paris (1890), making steam-powered compressors and centrifugal pumps for railway and military purposes. Subsequently, joined by engineers George Canton and Georg Unné, it was renamed Emile Salmson & Cie, building petrol-powered lifts and motors (1896).

The company became one of the first to make purpose-built aircraft engines, starting before World War I and continuing into World War II.

After World War I the company looked around for other work and started making car bodies and then complete cars.

Car production finished in 1957.

Focus also moved back to pump production and the facilities moved to Mayenne in 1961. The firm was bought by ITT-LMT in 1962 then by Thomson in 1976 and by Wilo in 1984.

Its headquarters today are in Chatou.

== Aircraft manufacture ==
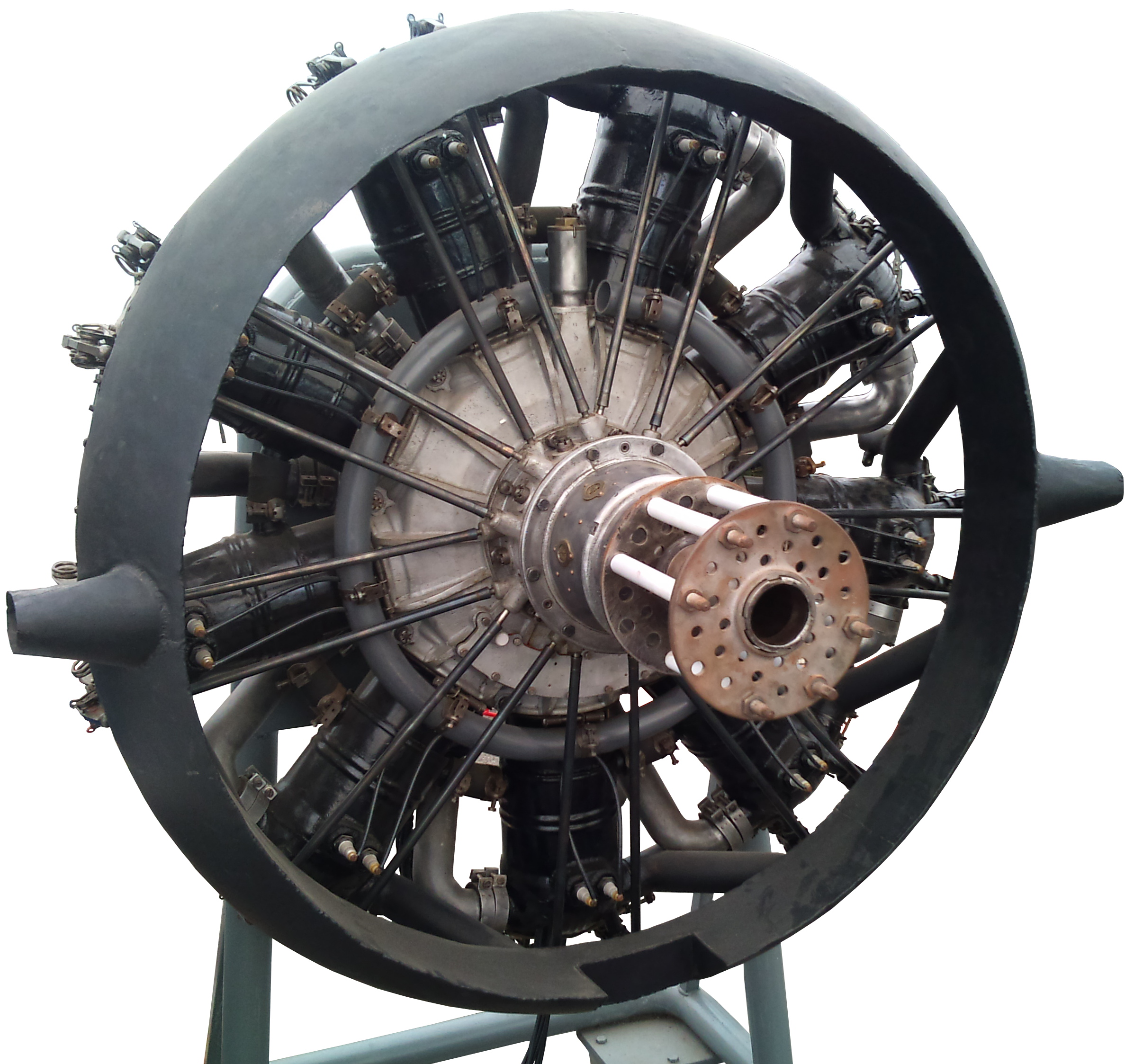
Salmson 9Z

It moved to Billancourt and manufactured the Salmson 9 series of air- and water-cooled radial engines. During World War I Salmson made its first complete aeroplanes, mainly the two-seat fighter/reconnaissance plane, the Salmson 2A2. These were used in combat by both the French and the American Expeditionary force. The company also designed a prototype of a single seat scout/fighter, the Salmson 3, but this was not produced in large quantities.

Salmson aircraft were also used for air mail to India in (1911).

Aeroplane manufacturing moved to Villeurbanne near Lyon.

Two world records were set by Maryse Bastié, who flew Le Bourget to Moscow (1931).

=== Aircraft ===
- Hanriot HD.3
- Hanriot H.26
- Hanriot H.31
- Hanriot H.33
- Salmson-Moineau A92H
- Salmson-Moineau S.M.1
- Salmson-Moineau S.M.2
- Salmson 1 A.3 (3-seat Artillery Spotter)
- Salmson 2 A.2 (2-seat Artillery Spotter)
- Salmson 2 Berline (Transport version of 2 A.2)
- Salmson 2 de l'Aéropostale
- Salmson 3 C.1 (Single-seat fighter)
- Salmson 4 Ab.2 (ground attack aircraft;)
- Salmson 5 A.2 (2-seat Artillery Spotter)
- Salmson 6 A.2 (2-seat Artillery Spotter)
- Salmson 7 A.2 (2-seat Artillery Spotter)
- Salmson 16 A.2 (2-seat Artillery Spotter)
- Salmson D-1 Phrygane (1934)
- Salmson D-2 Phrygane
- Salmson D-3 Phryganet
- Salmson D-4 Phrygane Major
- Salmson D-6 CriCri (1936)
- Salmson D-7 CriCri Major
- Salmson D-21 Phrygane
- Salmson D-211 Phrygane
- Salmson D-57 Phryganet

=== Aero engines ===
Aero engines produced up to 1917 are shown in the following table:

Name	Cyl.	Year	Bore	Stroke	Capacity	Power	Remarks
A	2 × 7-cyl barrel	1908	75 mm (2.953 in)	125 mm (4.921 in)	7.7 L (469.88 cu in)	37.285 kW (50 hp) at 800 rpm	Barrel engine 1 built bench tests only
B	2 × 7-cyl barrel	1910	75 mm (2.953 in)	125 mm (4.921 in)	7.7 L (469.88 cu in)	37.285 kW (50 hp) at 800 rpm	1 built bench tests only – water-cooled.
C	2 × 7-cyl barrel	1910	85 mm (3.346 in)	95 mm (3.740 in)	8 L (488.19 cu in)	44.74 kW (60 hp) at 1,100 rpm	1 built with rotary inlet valves – water-cooled.
D	2 × 7-cyl barrel	1910	85 mm (3.346 in)	95 mm (3.740 in)	8 L (488.19 cu in)	44.74 kW (60 hp) at 1,100 rpm	1 built with rotary inlet valves – water-cooled.
E	2 × 9-cyl barrel	1911	110 mm (4.331 in)	130 mm (5.118 in)	22 L (1,342.52 cu in)	55.93 kW (75 hp)	1 built – timed valves – water-cooled.
F	2 × 9-cyl barrel	1911	110 mm (4.331 in)	130 mm (5.118 in)	22 L (1,342.52 cu in)	55.93 kW (75 hp) at 1,200 rpm	1 built – timed valves – water-cooled.
K	2 × 7-cyl barrel	1912	85 mm (3.346 in)	105 mm (4.134 in)	11 L (671.26 cu in)	63.4 kW (85 hp) at 1,200 rpm	1 built – automatic inlet valves – water-cooled
A7	7-cyl radial	1911	120 mm (4.724 in)	140 mm (5.512 in)	11 L (671.26 cu in)	59.65 kW (80 hp) – 74.57 kW (100 hp)	5 built for bench testing – water-cooled
A9	9-cyl radial	1912	122 mm (4.803 in)	140 mm (5.512 in)	14.73 L (898.88 cu in)	82 kW (110 hp) – 96.94 kW (130 hp)	30 built – certified to 47 hours running by 1914
C9	9-cyl radial	1912	150 mm (5.906 in)	180 mm (7.087 in)	28.63 L (1,747.11 cu in)	223.7 kW (300 hp)	1 built for testing
M7	7-cyl radial	1913	122 mm (4.803 in)	140 mm (5.512 in)	11.5 L (701.77 cu in)	74.57 kW (100 hp) – 85.75 kW (115 hp)	50 built for bench testing – water-cooled
2M7	14-cyl 2-row radial	1913	122 mm (4.803 in)	140 mm (5.512 in)	23 L (1,403.55 cu in)	149.1 kW (200 hp) at 1,300 rpm	Water-cooled – 15 built in France 300 built in Great Britain. Powered the Kennedy Giant, Short Type 166, Sopwith Bat Boat II, Sopwith Type C, Sopwith Type 860 and Wight Navyplane.
2A9	18 cyl 2-row radial	1913	122 mm (4.803 in)	140 mm (5.512 in)	29.46 L (1,797.76 cu in)	233.7 kW (313 hp) at 1500 rpm	1 built for bench testing – water-cooled
B9	9-cyl radial	1913	122 mm (4.803 in)	140 mm (5.512 in)	14.73 L (898.88 cu in)	104.4 kW (140 hp)	Water-cooled – 106 built in Great Britain, 300 built in France. Powered the Short Type 135, Short S.74 et Short Type 830 and Voisin LA 5
M9	9-cyl radial	1914	122 mm (4.803 in)	140 mm (5.512 in)	14.73 L (898.88 cu in)	89.48 kW (120 hp) – 96.94 kW (130 hp)	Water-cooled – 500 built in France. Powered the Voisin LA 3, Bréguet U2, Blackburn Type L, Breguet 14 prototype.
P9	9-cyl radial	1915	122 mm (4.803 in)	140 mm (5.512 in)	14.73 L (898.88 cu in)	111.85 kW (150 hp)	Water-cooled – 300 built in France, 300 built in Russia. Powered the Voisin type LA 5 and Farman HF.27
R9	9-cyl radial	1915	125 mm (4.921 in)	140 mm (5.512 in)	15.46 L (943.43 cu in)	111.85 kW (150 hp) – 119.3 kW (160 hp) at 1,300 rpm	Water-cooled – 50 built in France, 300 built in Russia. Powered the Lebed 12, Anatra DS, and Salmson-Moineau (1917) prototype
9Z	9-cyl radial	1917	125 mm (4.921 in)	170 mm (6.693 in)	18.7 L (1,141.14 cu in)	186.4 kW (250 hp) at 1,400 rpm	a.k.a. Z9 Water-cooled – 3000 built in France, 56 built in Great Britain. Powered the Salmson 2A2, Farman 60, Voisin Triplane, Caudron C.23, Hanriot H.26 and Vickers Vimy prototype
9Za	9-cyl radial						Variant of the 9Z, powered the Hanriot HD.3
9Zm	9-cyl radial						Variant of the 9Z
9Zc	9-cyl radial						Variant of the 9Z
CM9	9-cyl radial					194 kW (260 hp)	powered the Salmson 2 Berline
Salmson 18ZA	18-cyl radial					373 kW (500 hp)	powered the Hanriot H.33
Salmson 18ZC	18-cyl radial					373 kW (500 hp)	powered the Hanriot H.31

=== Salmson post World War One engines ===
In common with several other French aero-engine manufacturers Salmson named their engines with the number of cylinders then a series letter in capitals followed by variant letters in lower-case. Engines not included in the 1932 table are listed here:

3 Ad
5 Ac
5 Ap-01
5 Aq-01
6 Ad
?
6 TE
6 TE.S
7 Aca
7 Aq
7 M
7 Om

8 As
9 AB
9 ABa
9 ABc
172 kW (230 hp)
9 Az
9 A2c
9 M
9 Nd
131 kW (175 hp)
9 P

9 Y
11 B
12 C
W-12
18 AB
18 Cm
18 Z

- Salmson 11 B
- Salmson 12 C W-12
- Salmson 18 Ab
- Salmson 18 Cm
- Salmson 18 Z

Salmson-Szydlowski SH18

Salmson air-cooled engines available in 1932 are tabled here:

Name	Cyl.	Year	Bore	Stroke	Capacity	Power	Weight
7 AC	7-cyl radial		100 mm (3.937 in)	130 mm (5.118 in)	7.150 L (436.32 cu in)	78 kW (105 hp) at 1,800 rpm	Weight 130 kg (287 lb)
9 AD	9-cyl radial		70 mm (2.756 in)	86 mm (3.386 in)	2.979 L (181.79 cu in)	33.56 kW (45 hp) at 2,000 rpm	Weight 68 kg (150 lb)
9 ADb	9-cyl radial		70 mm (2.756 in)	86 mm (3.386 in)	2.979 L (181.79 cu in)	41 kW (55 hp) at 2,200 rpm	Weight 74 kg (163 lb)
9 ADr	9-cyl radial		70 mm (2.756 in)	86 mm (3.386 in)	2.979 L (181.79 cu in)	48.5 kW (65 hp) at 2,700 rpm	Weight 79 kg (174 lb)
9 AC	9-cyl radial		100 mm (3.937 in)	130 mm (5.118 in)	9.189 L (560.75 cu in)	96.94 kW (130 hp) at 1,800 rpm	Weight 170 kg (375 lb)
9 NC	9-cyl radial		100 mm (3.937 in)	140 mm (5.512 in)	9.9 L (604.14 cu in)	111.85 kW (150 hp) at 1,800 rpm	Weight 155 kg (342 lb)
9 NCt	9-cyl radial		100 mm (3.937 in)	140 mm (5.512 in)	9.9 L (604.14 cu in)	126.77 kW (170 hp) at 1,800 rpm	Weight 165 kg (364 lb)
9 AB	9-cyl radial		125 mm (4.921 in)	170 mm (6.693 in)	18.765 L (1,145.11 cu in)	186.4 kW (250 hp) at 1,700 rpm	Weight 265 kg (584 lb)
9 NA	9-cyl radial		140 mm (5.512 in)	160 mm (6.299 in)	22.140 L (1,351.07 cu in)	246 kW (330 hp) at 1,800 rpm	Weight 292 kg (644 lb)
9 NAs	9-cyl radial		140 mm (5.512 in)	160 mm (6.299 in)	22.14 L (1,351.07 cu in)	41 kW (55 hp) at 1,800 rpm	Weight 315 kg (694 lb)
18 AB	18-cyl 2-row radial		125 mm (4.921 in)	180 mm (7.087 in)	39.76 L (2,426.30 cu in)	410.1 kW (550 hp) at 1,700 rpm	Weight 150 kg (331 lb)
18 ABs	18-cyl 2-row radial		125 mm (4.921 in)	180 mm (7.087 in)	39.76 L (2,426.30 cu in)	484.7 kW (650 hp) at 1,700 rpm	Weight 465 kg (1,025 lb)

== Car manufacture ==
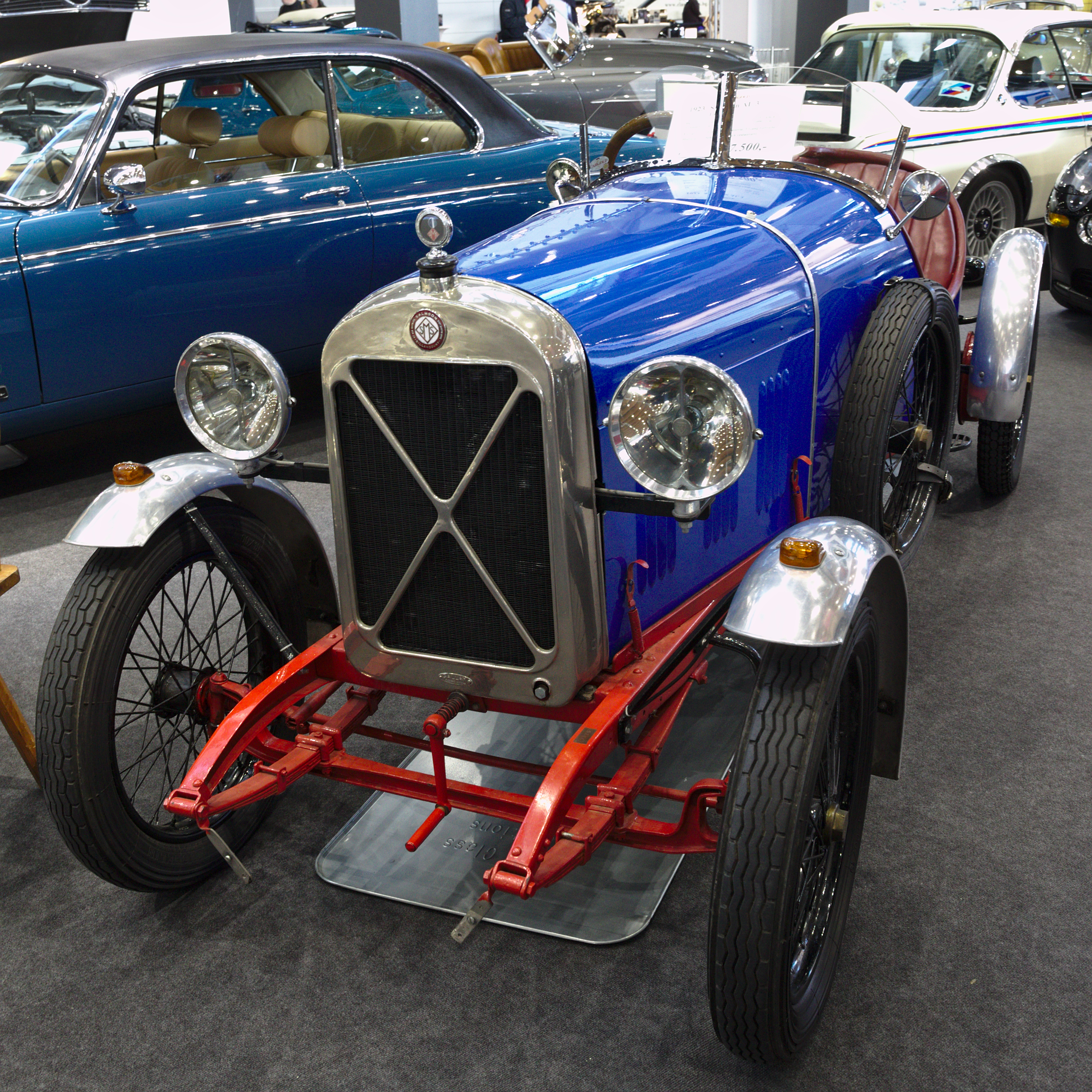
Salmson AL3 1923

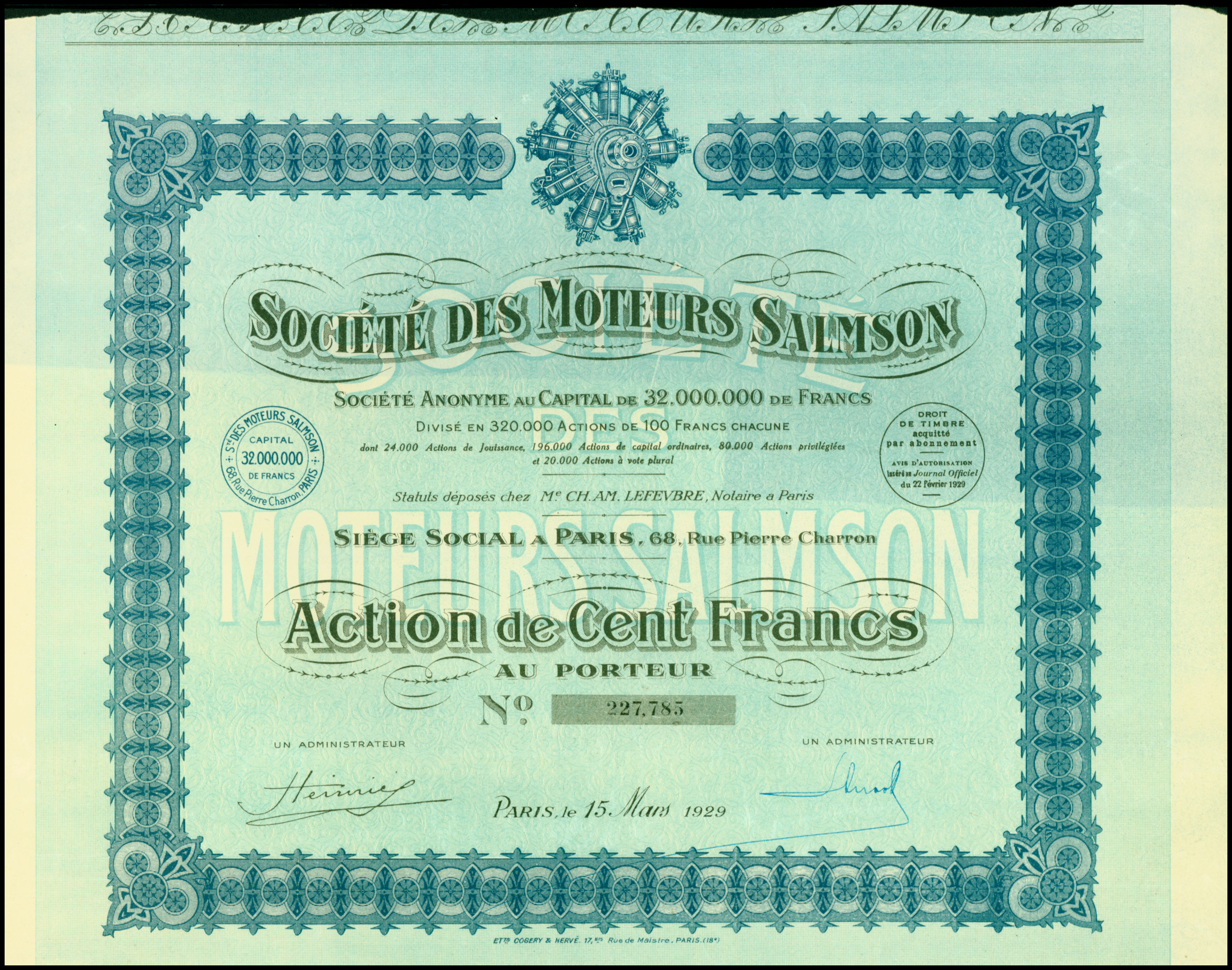
Share of the Soc. des Moteurs Salmson, issued 15. March 1929

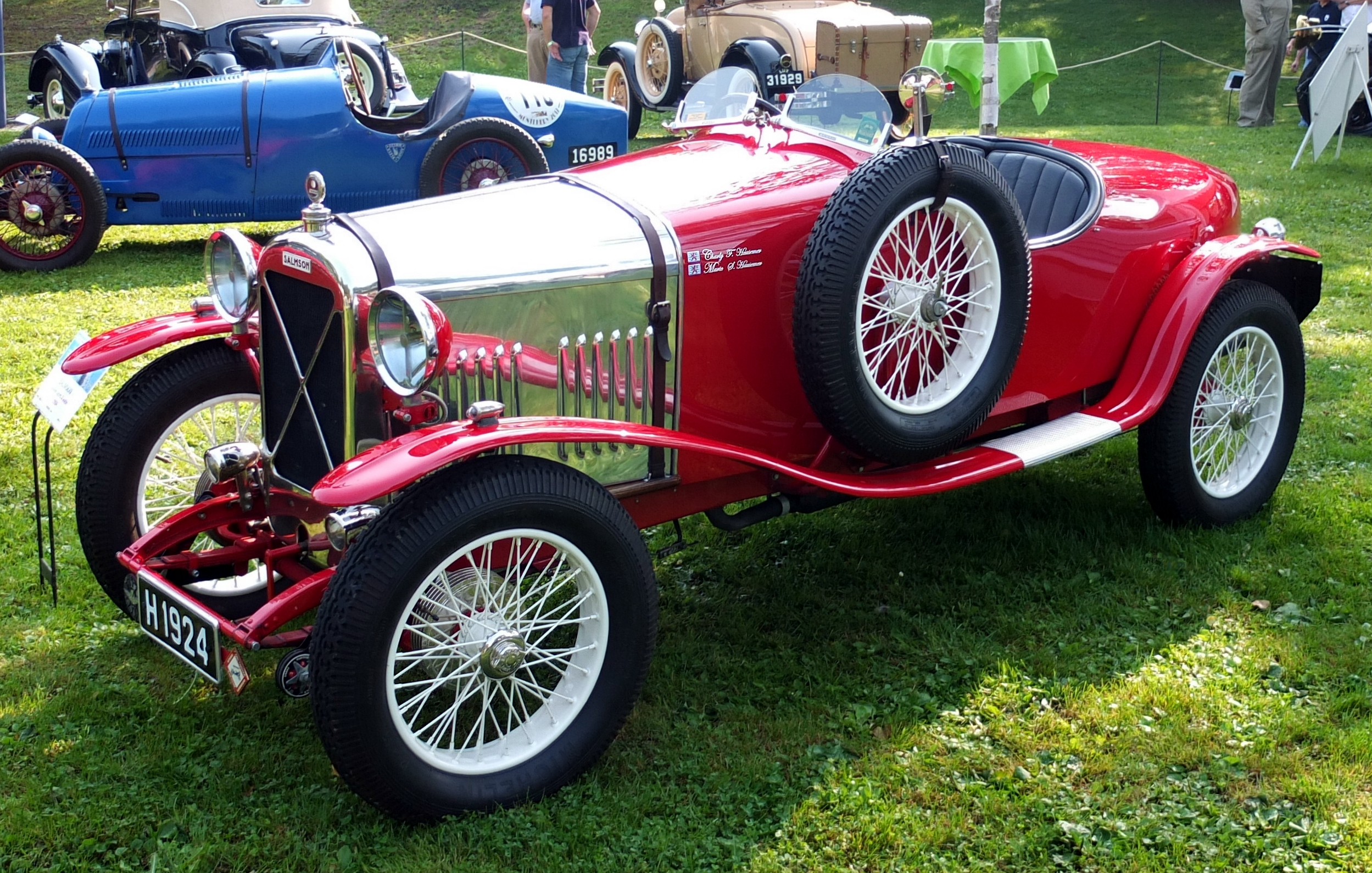
Salmson Grand Sport 1924

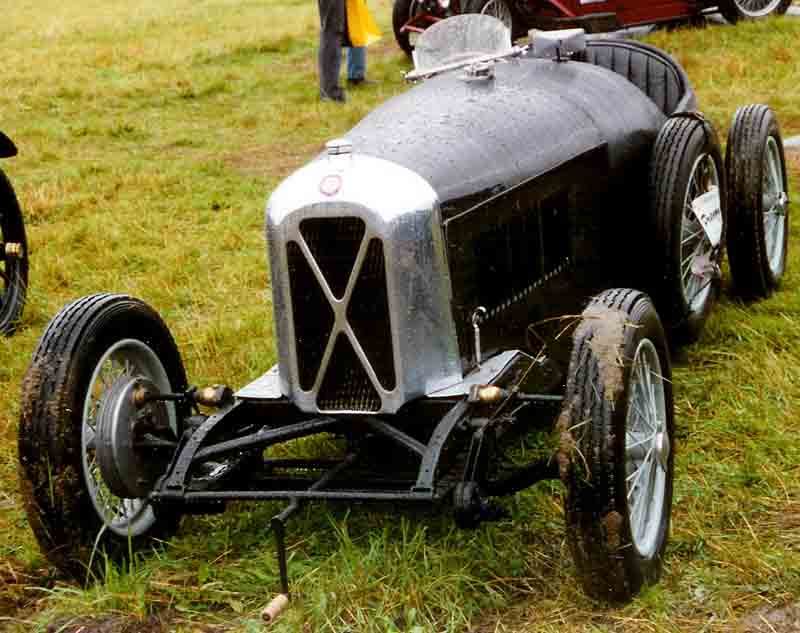
Salmson Grand Prix 1927

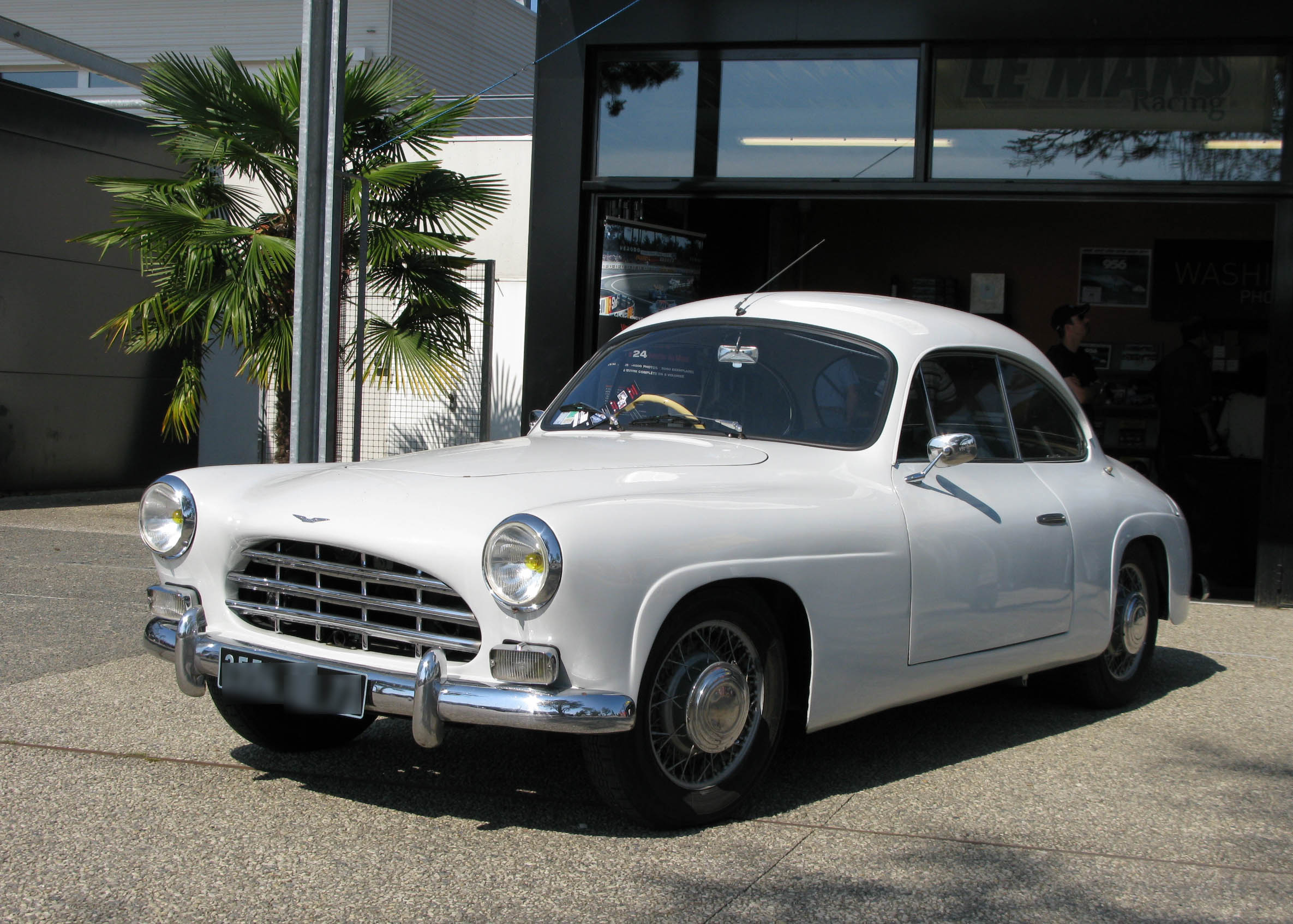
The Salmson 2300S turned out to be the company's last car.

The Billancourt factory became the car manufacturing plant directed by Emile Petit. As the firm had no direct car design expertise they started by building the British GN cyclecar under licence, displaying six cars at the 1919 Paris Salon.

In 1922 the car part of the business became a separate company, named Société des Moteurs Salmson.

The first Salmson car proper used a four-cylinder engine designed by Petit with unusual valve gear: a single pushrod actuated both inlet and exhaust valves pushing to open the exhaust and pulling to open the inlet. This was used in the AL models from 1921. Later the same year the company built its first twin-overhead-cam engine, which was fitted to the 1922 D-type, although most production at first used the pushrod engine.

Models included:

=== Early models ===
- AL (cyclecar, 1920)
- D-type (1922)
- VAL3 (1922)
- AL3 (1923)
- GSC San Sebastian
- Gran Sport (GS, 1924–30)
- 2ACT (1926)

Salmson won 550 automobile races and set ten world records (1921–28) before closing the racing department in 1929.

=== S-series models ===
The S-series cars took over from the D-type, starting in 1929 and becoming a long lived series.

- S4 (1929–32)
- S4C (1932)
- S4D (1934)
- S4DA (1935–38)
- S4-61 (1938–51)
- S4E (1938–51)

=== Post-War ===
- 2300 Sport Coupe (1953 to 1957)

After World War II the Salmson Typ S4E and Salmson Type S4-61 were re-introduced. Initially, as before the war, they were in most respects mutually indistinguishable from the outside apart from the slightly longer nose on the Type S4-E. The Type S4-61 retained its four-cylinder in-line 1,730 cc engine. The standard body was a four-door sedan/saloon, 4510 mm in length for the four-cylinder car and 4610 mm with the larger engine. As well as the sedan/saloon there was a four-seater two-door coupe version of the S4-61 although this variant represented barely 10% of the post-war S4-61‘s total sales. A few two-door cabriolets were produced.

In October 1947 a substantially updated body appeared for the Type S4-E, featuring more flamboyant wheel arches and lowered headlights, now set into the body work rather than perching above the front wings. The revised frontal treatment also quickly found its way onto the coupé and cabriolet variants, making the 13CV (2312cc) S4-E easier to distinguish from the 10 CV (1730cc) S4-61 than hitherto. Like France's other luxury car makers, Salmson sales suffered from a government taxation policy that penalised cars with large engines and a French economy which during the five-year period from 1945 to 1950 resolutely failed to show significant signs of growth. Overall volumes were depressed. Nevertheless, the 336 cars produced in 1948 – split between the 10CV and 13CV cars in a ratio of approximately 2:1 – did provide grounds for cautious optimism when compared to the 1947 volume of just 143 cars built.

In 1950 a new car arrived in the shape of the Randonnée E-72. Car sales nevertheless continued to be slow in the postwar market. The company's passenger car production reached a postwar peak of 1,162 in 1950, but by 1952 had slumped to just 89. The company had been kept going by its aircraft engine sales, although the factory had to close for a period.

A new car, the 2300 S, was shown in 1953 and it took part in the 1955, 1956 and 1957 Le Mans 24-hour races

After bankruptcy in 1953, all activities ended in 1957 and Renault bought the factory.

== See also ==
- British Salmson
- List of aircraft engines
