= Salmson 2 =

Military reconnaissance aircraft

Salmson 2 A.2
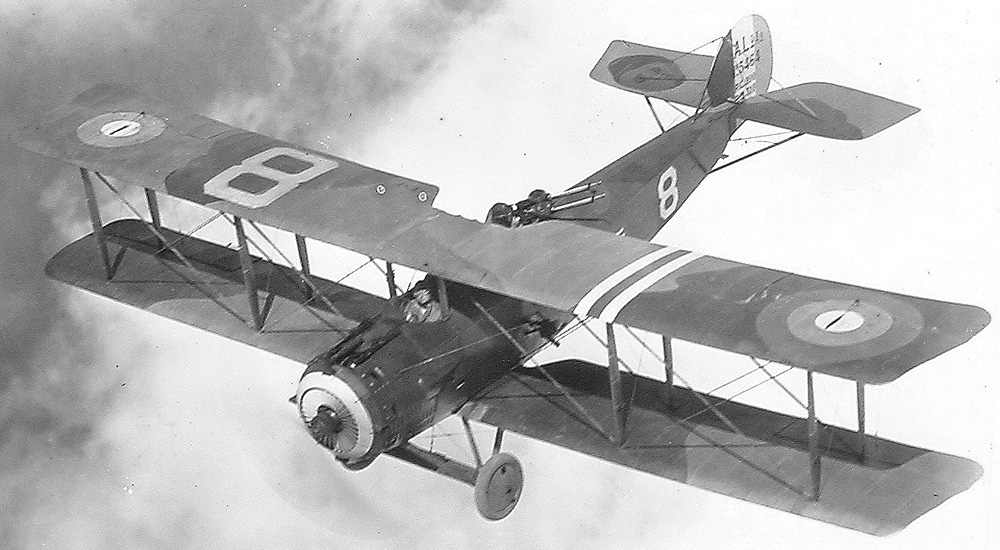

General information
- Type: Reconnaissance biplane
- Manufacturer: Salmson
- Number built: 3,800+

History
- First flight: 1917

The Salmson 2 A.2, (often shortened to Salmson 2) was a French biplane reconnaissance aircraft developed and produced by Salmson to a 1916 requirement. Along with the Breguet 14, it was the main reconnaissance aircraft of the French army in 1918 and was also used by American Expeditionary Force aviation units. At the end of the First World War, one-third of French reconnaissance aircraft were Salmson 2s.

== Design and development ==
During the First World War, the Salmson factory built aircraft engines, generally 9- and later 18-cylinder water-cooled radial engines developed from the Swiss Canton-Unné design, an early stationary radial engine design used for military aircraft. The company's first aircraft was the Salmson-Moineau S.M.1, an unusual three-seat reconnaissance biplane with twin propellers gear-driven from a single Salmson engine mounted sideways in the fuselage but it was not successful although it saw limited production.

The Salmson 2 came from a requirement to replace the Sopwith 1½ Strutter and Dorand A.R. reconnaissance aircraft in the A.2 (tactical reconnaissance) role. Salmson had built the 1½ Strutter under license, and the Salmson 2, while an original design, had more in common with the Sopwith than to the Salmson-Moineau. The aircraft was of conventional construction with a two-bay biplane configuration, powered by the company's own 230 hp (170 kW) Salmson 9Z water-cooled radial engine. Some minor control problems were quickly resolved in early testing, but the main defect of the Salmson 2, shared with the contemporary Airco DH.4, was that the pilot and gunner were widely separated, making communication difficult. Production was ordered after trials on 29 April 1917, and deliveries were underway by October of that year. Around 3,200 Salmson 2s were built in France, 2,200 by Salmson and the remainder by the Latécoère, Hanriot, and Desfontaines, companies. Some of these were Salmson 2 E.2 dual control advanced training (Ecole) aircraft.

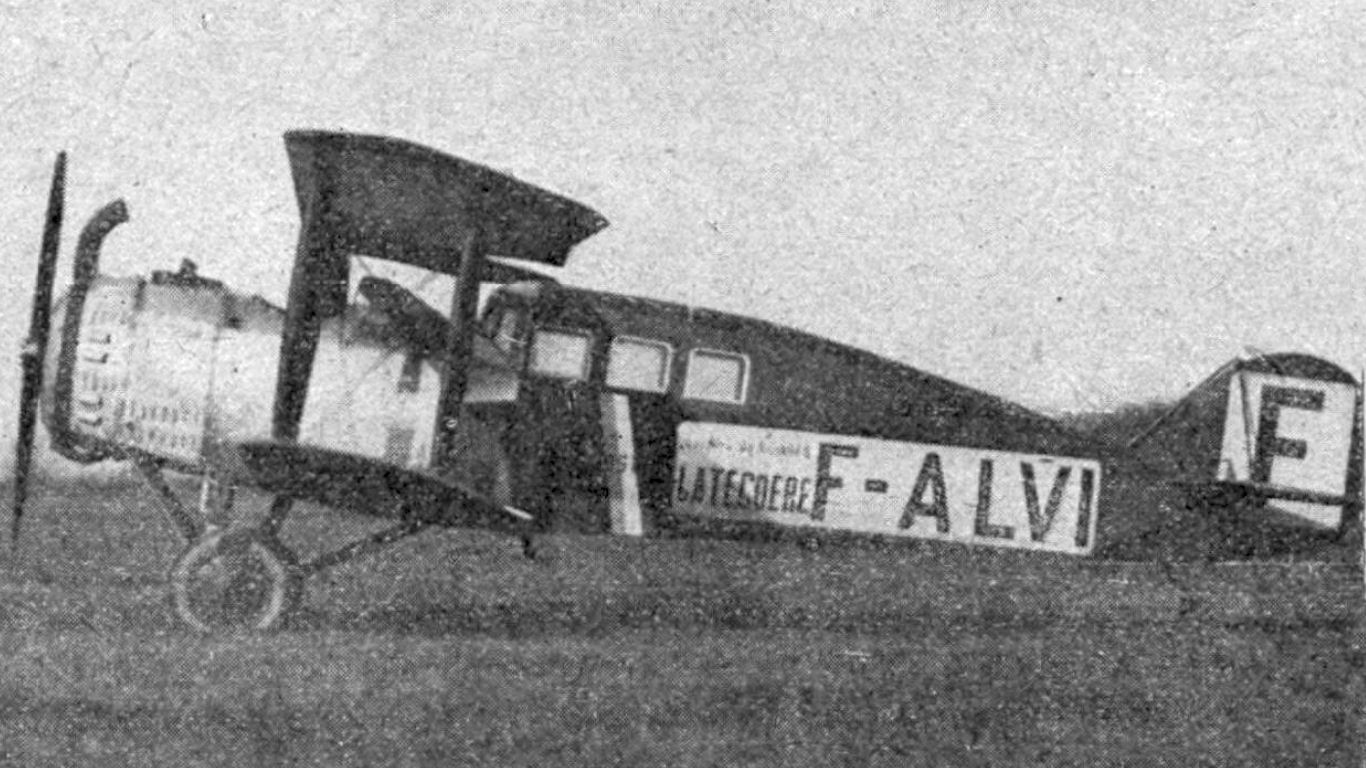
Salmson 2 Limousine photo from L'Aéronautique October 1921

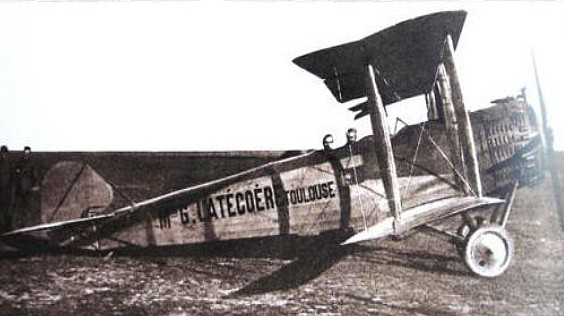
Salmson 2 Berline of Lignes Aeriennes Latécoére, circa 1918

== Variants ==
Developments of the Salmson 2 included:

- Salmson 2 A.2 standard model.
- Salmson 2 E.2 dual control advanced training aircraft.
- Salmson 4 Ab.2 was an enlarged version fitted with armour to meet the ground attack role. Production in 1918 was limited, and was cancelled at the end of the war.
- Salmson 5 A.2 was a modified Salmson 2, with no production.
- Salmson 7 A.2 was a modified Salmson 2. The primary change was that the pilot and gunner were seated back-to-back in a single cockpit. Large scale production was planned, but was cancelled with the end of the war.
- Salmson Limousine ex-military Salmson 2s converted into enclosed civilian passenger aircraft after the First World War.
- Salmson 2 Berline ex-military Salmson 2s converted into open cockpit civilian passenger aircraft after the First World War.
- Kawasaki Army Otsu-1 (乙-1) Reconnaissance Aircraft was a Japanese licence-built Salmson 2 A.2.

== Operational history ==
In addition to its service with the French army, the Salmson 2 served during the First World War with United States air units. Some 700 were purchased, and were generally successful.

Postwar Salmson 2s were purchased by Czechoslovakia, and remained in service until 1924. Others were transferred to Poland, but were withdrawn by 1920, and replaced by Bristol F.2Bs. Japan undertook licensed production as the Army Type Otsu 1, also known as the Kawasaki-Salmson. The number of aircraft built in Japan is unclear; 300 were built by Kawasaki, and the same quantity by the Imperial Japanese Army's Tokorozawa supply depot, although the total number of aircraft produced may have been as high as 1,000.

After First World War, the Salmson 2 A.2 produced by Latécoère were the first aircraft used by French pioneering airmail company Aéropostale.

== Military operators ==
=== Wartime ===
France

- French Air Force

United States

- American Expeditionary Force

=== Post-war ===
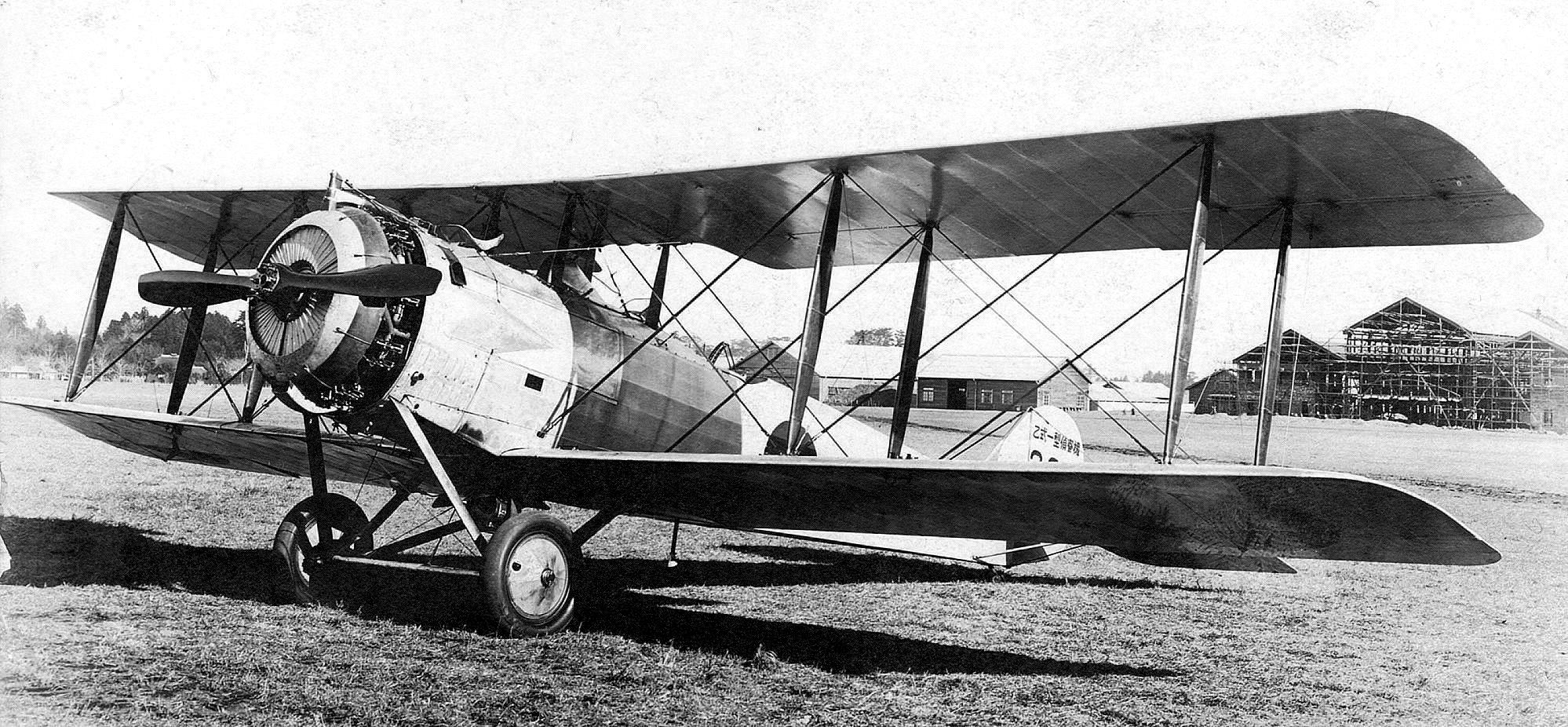
Japanese Otsu-1

Belgium

- Belgian Air Force - One aircraft only.

Czechoslovakia

- Czechoslovak Air Force

France

- French Navy

Japan

- Imperial Japanese Army

Peru

- Peruvian Air Force - One aircraft only.

Poland

- Polish Air Force

Spain

- Spanish Air Force - One aircraft only.

Russia / Soviet Union

- Soviet Air Force

== Aircraft on display ==
- Kakamigahara Aerospace Museum, Kakamigahara, Gifu (replica)
- L'Envol des Pionniers, Toulouse, France (replica)
Replicas

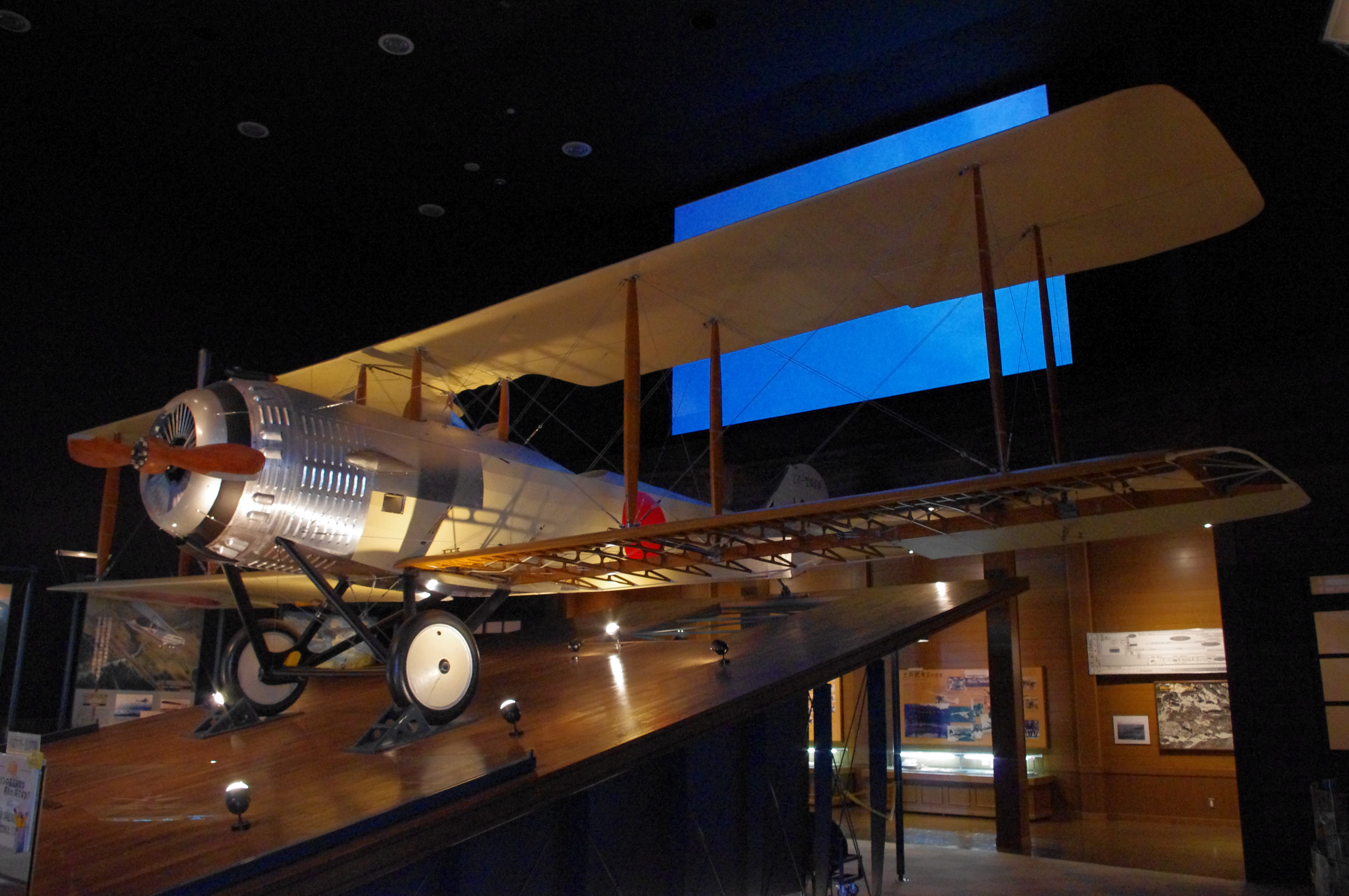
Replica Salmson 2 A.2/Otsu 1 in Japan.

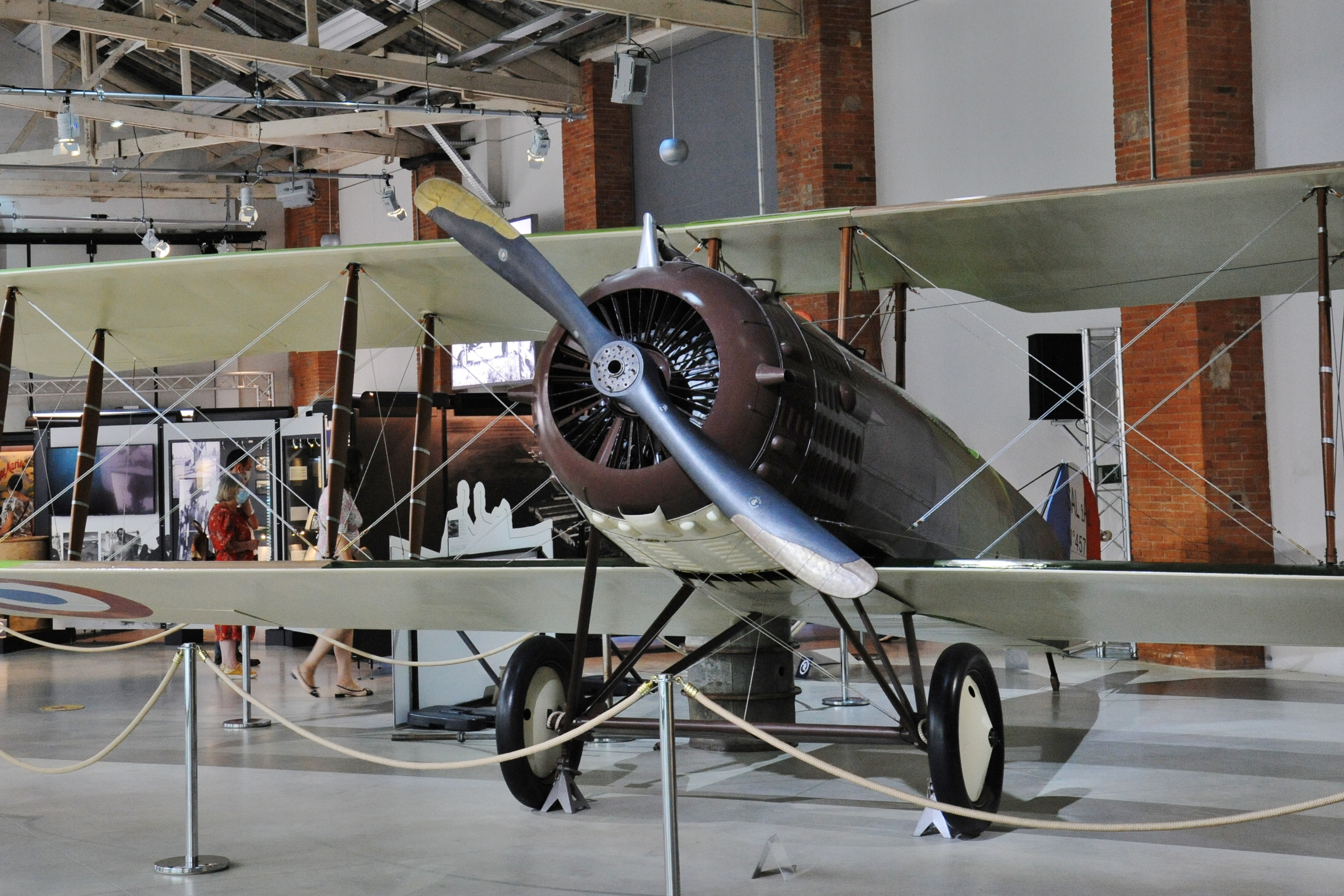
Replica Salmson 2 A.2 in Toulouse, France.

== Specifications ==
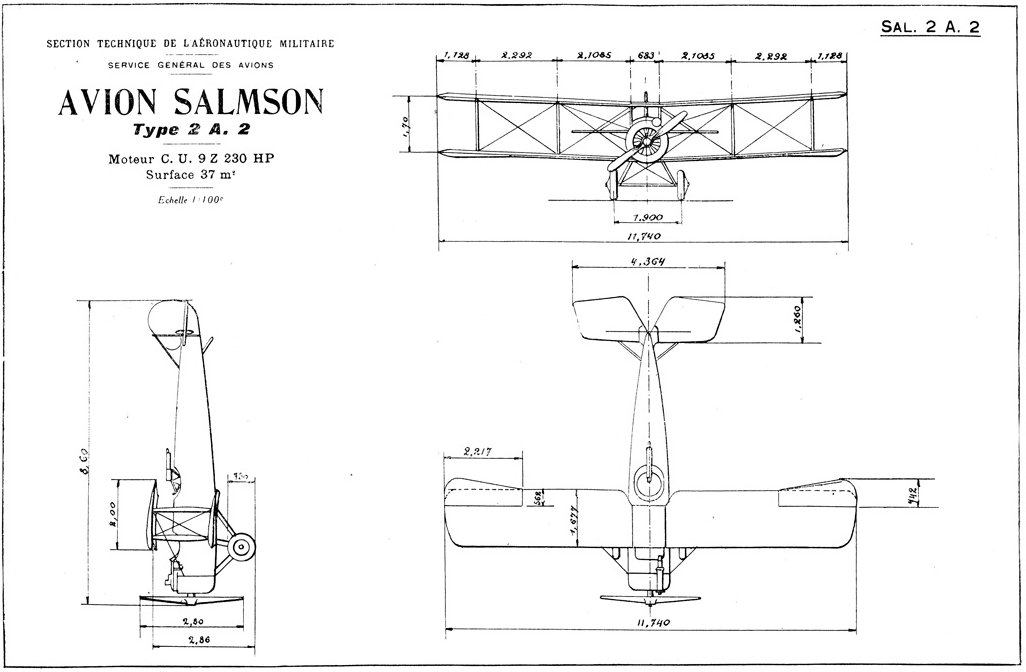
Salmson 2 A.2 drawing

Data from French Aircraft of the First World War

General characteristics

- Crew: 2
- Length: 8.5 m (27 ft 11 in)
- Wingspan: 11.75 m (38 ft 7 in)
- Height: 2.9 m (9 ft 6 in)
- Wing area: 37.27 m^{2} (401.2 sq ft)
- Empty weight: 780 kg (1,720 lb)
- Gross weight: 1,290 kg (2,844 lb)
- Powerplant: 1 × Salmson 9Za 9-cylinder water-cooled radial piston engine, 172 kW (231 hp)
- Propellers: 2-bladed fixed-pitch propeller

Performance

- Maximum speed: 188 km/h (117 mph, 102 kn) at sea level
- Range: 500 km (310 mi, 270 nmi)
- Service ceiling: 6,250 m (20,510 ft)
- Time to altitude: 2,000 m (6,562 ft) in 7 minutes 13 seconds

Armament

- Guns: *
  - 1 × forward synchronized 0.303 in Vickers machine gun
  - 2 × rear, ring-mounted 0.303 in Lewis guns

== Bibliography ==
- Méchin, David (April 2023). "Le Salmson 2A2: Bonne surprise sous l'uniforme, Première partie" [The Salmson 2A2: A Pleasant Surprise under the Uniform, Part 1]. Le Fana de l'Aviation (in French) (641): 62–70. ISSN 0757-4169.
- Méchin, David (May 2023). "Le Salmson 2A2: Le guerrier de retour au civil" [The Salmson 2A2: The Warrior Returns to Civil Life]. Le Fana de l'Aviation (in French) (642): 68–75. ISSN 0757-4169.
- Morareau, Lucien (February 1990). "Histoire de l'Aviation Embarquée en France: La 4^{eme} Flotille, de la reconnaissance au bombardement". Le Fana de l'Aviation (in French) (243): 14–17, 19–21. ISSN 0757-4169.
