= Salmson Phrygane =

French light aircraft of the 1930s

Phrygane
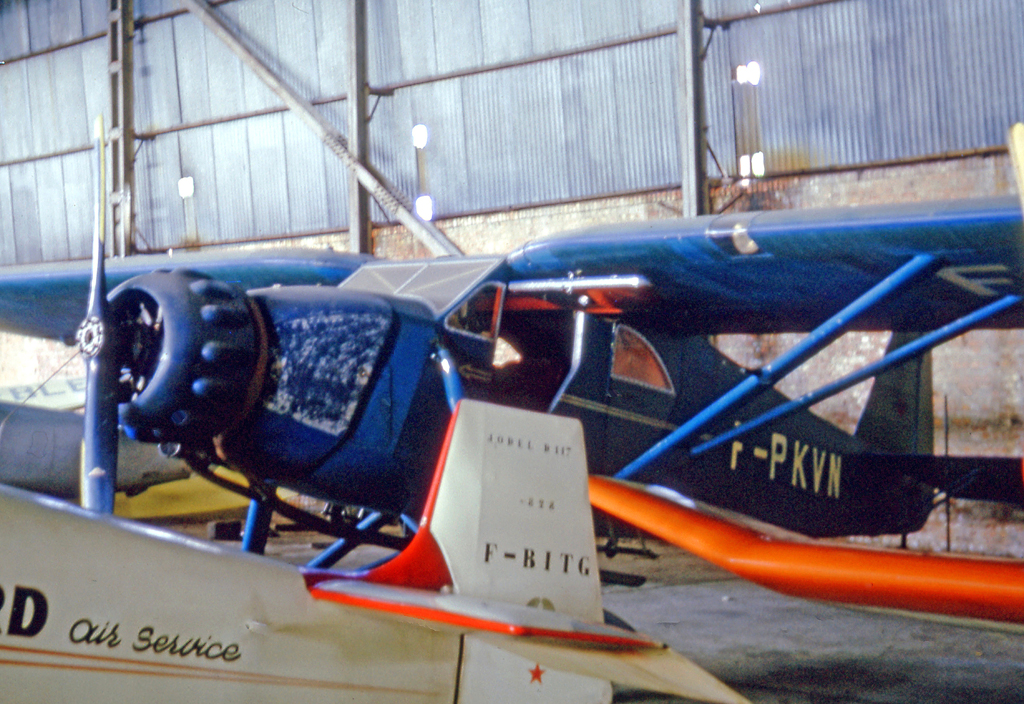
- D-211 Super Phrygane at Lille Lesquin Airport in 1965

General information
- Type: Utility aircraft
- Manufacturer: Salmson, CFA
- Designer: Paul Deville
- Primary user: private pilot owners
- Number built: 30

History
- First flight: 3 October 1933

The Salmson Phrygane ("Caddisfly") was a French light aircraft of the 1930s.

== Design and production ==
The Phrygane was a conventional, high-wing strut-braced monoplane with fixed tailwheel undercarriage and a fully enclosed cabin for the pilot and either two or four passengers, depending on the version. Salmson sold about 25 examples before the outbreak of World War II.

Following the war, Compagnie Française d'Aviation attempted to revive the design, but only four examples were built.

== Operational history ==
The Phrygane was flown by private pilot owners and by aero clubs. Several examples of this aircraft design survived the war and a few postwar modified aircraft were built by CFA. A D-211 was still in service with Avia Nord at Lille Lesquin airfield during July 1965.

== Variants ==
- D-1 Phrygane – prototype with Salmson 7 Aca engine (one built)
- D-2 Phrygane – main production version with Salmson 9Nc engine (23 built)
  - D-21 Phrygane – postwar four-seat version of D2 (one built)
    - D-211 Super Phrygane – final postwar version of 1951 with Salmson 7Aq (one built)
- D-3 Phryganet – two-seat version of 1936 (one built)
  - D-57 Phryganet – postwar version of D3 (one built)
- D-4 Phrygane Major – 1935 version with Salmson 9Nd (one built)

== Specifications (D2) ==
General characteristics

- Crew: one pilot
- Capacity: two passengers
- Length: 7.83 m (25 ft 8 in)
- Wingspan: 11.70 m (38 ft 5 in)
- Height: 2.35 m (7 ft 8 in)
- Wing area: 22.5 m^{2} (242 sq ft)
- Empty weight: 650 kg (1,433 lb)
- Gross weight: 1,100 kg (2,425 lb)
- Powerplant: 1 × Salmson 9Nc , 101 kW (135 hp)

Performance

- Maximum speed: 195 km/h (122 mph, 106 kn)
- Range: 1,000 km (620 mi, 540 nmi)
- Service ceiling: 5,800 m (19,024 ft)
