= René Moineau =

French pilot and engineer (1887–1948)

René Moineau (August 11, 1887 – October 5, 1948) was one of the French pioneers of aviation and an inventor in various branches of aeronautics and fluid mechanics. A pilot and engineer at Bréguet, he designed his own plane, the Salmson-Moineau SM-1, in 1915, then devoted himself to numerous inventions, several patented, including the Moineau pump still used in industry, and the first retractable landing gear (for which he filed the patent in 1918).

== Biography ==
The son of Louis Moineau and Marguerite Moitrier, René Joseph Louis Moineau was born in Lisieux on August 11, 1887. The family was originally from Nièvre and Lorraine. He spent his childhood in Versailles, then in Nancy, where he obtained his science degree in 1906 and the engineering degree from the Institute of Electrotechnics and Mechanics.

From 1909 he built his first biplane gliders, before discovering the free balloon and the hot air balloon; he passed his free balloon pilot's license the same year.

Moineau received his Brevet de pilote (French pilot's licence)- N° 544- in July 1911. In November of that year, he flew for Bréguet in the Concours d'Aviation Militaire de 1911 (Reims Military Aviation Competition, 1911).

Mobilized in August 1914 as a pilot, he was first assigned to the Bréguet 17 squadron (V103). After a stint at the Camp Retranché in Paris, he served in the SFA (Service des Fabrications de l'Aviation).

In 1916 he joined the Salmson establishments and designed the Salmson-Moineau SM-1, an unusual reconnaissance aircraft with its engine placed transversely driving two propellers. Some 150 examples were built.

In 1924, he created his company Avions René Moineau.

He remains best known as the inventor (in 1930) of the progressive cavity pump, which is still known by his name.

He died in Brussels, Belgium on October 5, 1948.

== Bibliography ==
- Jean-Louis Moineau, René Moineau : aviateur et inventeur, Paris, éd. de l'Officine, 2006, 256 p. ISBN 978-2-915680-59-1
- Henri Cholet, Les pompes à cavités progressantes, Paris, IFP, éditions Technip, 1997.
- Louis Bréguet, Louis Bréguet. Trente ans au service de l'aviation, Blondel la Rougerie, 1938.
- Louis Bréguet, Les avions Louis Bréguet. 1908-1938, (s.d.).
- Charles Dolfuss, Henry Boucher, Histoire de l'aéronautique, L'Illustration, 1942.
- Albert Étévé, Avant les cocardes. Les débuts de l'aviation militaire, Lavauzelle, 1961.
- Albert Etévé, La victoire des cocardes, Robert Laffont, 1970.
- Colonel Désiré Lucca, A. de Baillancourt, Création et débuts du Groupe des Escadrilles de Protection du Camp Retranché de Paris. Le Bourget, octobre 1914-février 1915, Le Puy, Les Arts graphiques, 1969.
- Georges Naudet, L'Aéronautique à la Belle Époque, 1976.
- Edmond Petit, Histoire mondiale de l'aviation, Hachette, 1967.
- Edmond Petit, Nouvelle histoire mondiale de l'aviation, Hachette, 1973.
- Service historique de l'armée de l'air, Les Escadrilles de l'aéronautique militaire française : Synthèse et histoire. 1912-1920.
- Georges Villa, Ailes et eux. Croquis et dessins, 1921.
- Bernard Marck, Dictionnaire universel de l'aviation, Paris, Tallandier, 2005, 1129 p. ISBN 2847340602, p. 728.
- Alain Pelletier, « Salmson-Moineau type 1 », Le Fana de l'Aviation, no 303, February 1995, p. 28-33.
- David Méchin, « Le Salmson-Moineau SM 1. Quand un constructeur manœuvrait mieux que son appareil », Le Fana de l'Aviation, no 597, August 2019, p. 68-78.
