= H33 =

H33 may refer to:

- H-33 (Michigan county highway)
- Bell H-33, an experimental American tiltrotor aircraft
- Hanriot H.33, a French biplane
- Highway H33 (Ukraine)
- HMS H33, a Royal Navy H-class submarine
- HMS Vanoc (H33), a Royal Navy V-class destroyer
- Retinal detachment
