= H31 =

H31 may refer to:

- Hanriot H.31, a French biplane fighter aircraft
- HMS Griffin (H31), a Royal Navy G-class destroyer later transferred to the Royal Canadian Navy and renamed HMCS Ottawa (H31)
- HMS H31, a Royal Navy H class submarine
