= Moineau =

Moineau (means "sparrow") is a French surname:

- Jules Moineau (anarchist), anarchist and signatory of the Manifesto of the Sixteen
- Julien Moineau (1903–1980), French road bicycle racer

== See also ==
- Salmson-Moineau (or Salmson-Moineau S.M.1), a French armed three-seat biplane long range reconnaissance aircraft
