= Deffontaines =

Deffontaines is a surname.

== List of people with the surname ==
- Achille Pierre Deffontaines (1858–1914), French general
- Léon Deffontaines (born 1996), French politician

== See also ==
- Desfontaines
