= Reims Military Aviation Competition, 1911 =

Competition used as a trial for potential service aircraft for the French armed forces

The Reims Military Aviation Competition (French: Concours militaire d'aviation) was a military aviation competition held in Reims in October 1911 that was organized by the French Army, with the purpose of trialling the performance of new aircraft for potential use by the French military. Although a number of aeronautical records were beaten during the competition, there were also a number of crashes and fatalities. It began on Friday October 6, 1911.

== Background ==
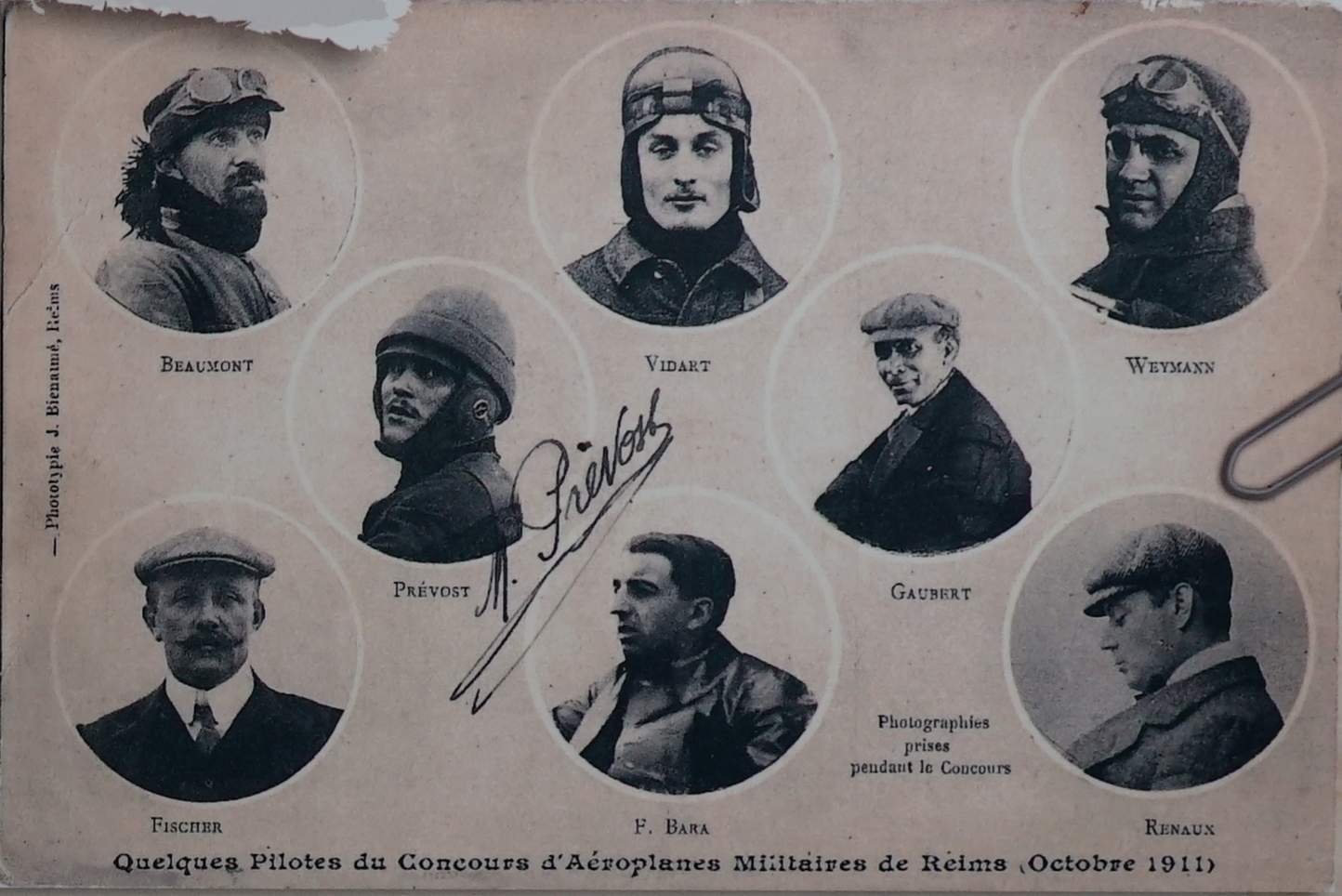
Pilots taking part in the contest

Aircraft manufacturers that exhibited at Le Grand Concours d'Aviation Militaire at Reims in October 1911 hoped to attract orders from the French military. Organized by the French Army, this competition required that the aircraft and engines be fully built in France, and be able to fly without stop on a closed circuit of 300 km with a 300 kg load (not including oil, water and fuel) at a speed of more than 60 km/h. Additionally, they were to be 3-seaters, and be able to take-off and land from unprepared surfaces. The first prize was 700,000 francs plus additional sums for increases in speed over 60 km/h, as well as a commitment by the military to purchase 10 aircraft. The competition attracted the major French aircraft manufacturers of the time, including Blériot, Breguet, Deperdussin, Farman, Hanriot, R.E.P. and Nieuport.

== Results ==
At the conclusion of the Reims military competition of November 1911, results were declared as follows:

1. Charles Weymann with a Nieuport IV G monoplane powered by a 14 cylinder Gnome engine of 100hp. It covered the 300 km course in 2h33min at a mean speed of 117 km/h.
2. René Moineau with a Breguet G 3 biplane powered by a 14 cylinder Gnome engine of 140 hp, 3h09, averaging 95 km/h.
3. Maurice Prévost with a Deperdussin Type B "Sport", powered by a Gnome 100hp engine. Prévost achieved an average speed of 89 km/h.
