= Compagnie Française d'Aviation =

French aircraft manufacturer

Compagnie Française d'Aviation (CFA) was a French aircraft manufacturer of the 1930s and 1940s. It was established in 1936 as a division of the Salmson engine company to handle the mass production of the Cricri light aircraft.

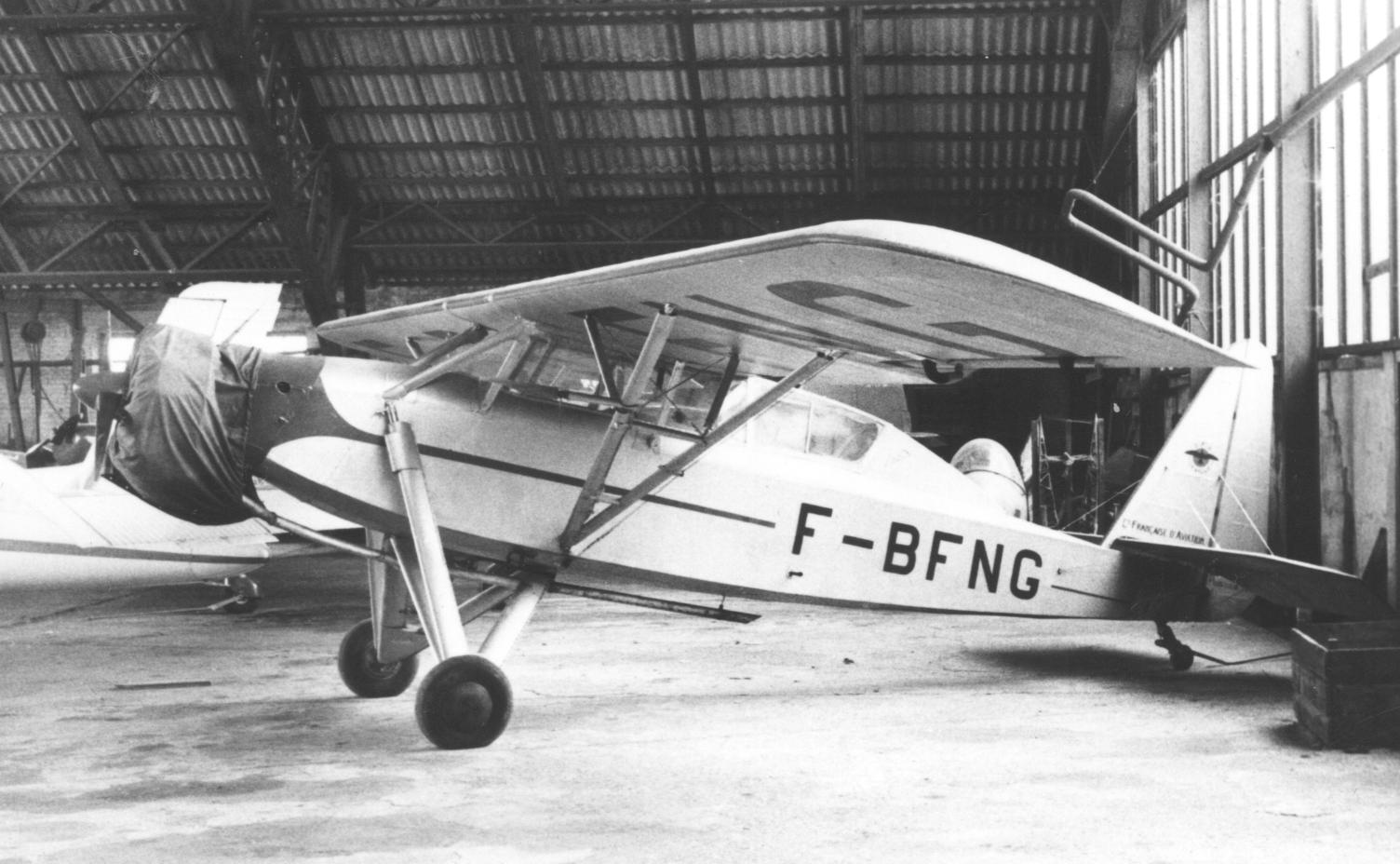
D.7 Cricri Major built by CFA in 1947 at Pontoise airfield near Paris in 1967

Manufacturing was interrupted by World War II, but was revived on a small scale thereafter. By 1951, their CFA D.7 Cricri Major design and its derivatives were thoroughly outdated, and the company was dissolved at this time.
