= Salmson Cricri =

Cricri
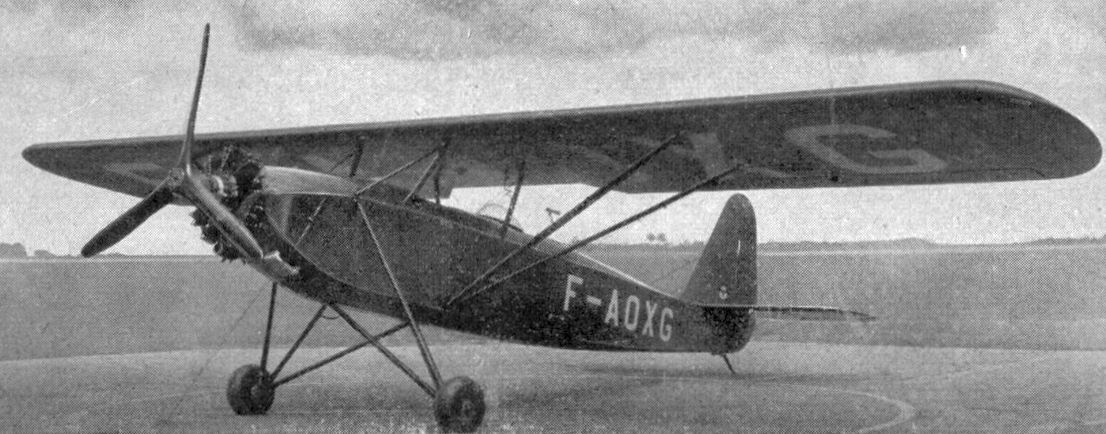

General information
- Type: Recreational aircraft
- Manufacturer: Salmson, CFA
- Designer: Paul Deville
- Number built: 341

History
- First flight: 14 April 1936
- Variants: CFA D.7 Cricri Major

The Salmson Cricri ("Cricket") was a French light aircraft of the 1930s.

== Design and development ==
The Cricri was a conventional, parasol-wing monoplane with fixed tailskid undercarriage and seating in tandem open cockpits for the pilot and passenger.

Although originally intended for recreational flying, the type achieved its greatest success when it was selected by the French government to equip the Aviation Populaire, resulting in sales of over 300 machines. This plane was also used as a trainer and patrol aircraft in the French Air Force.

Following the war, CFA attempted to revive the design as the Cricri Major. This differed from its predecessor mainly in having a more powerful engine and an enclosed cabin. Eventually, only ten examples were built.

== Variants ==
D6 Cricri
(329 built)
D63 Cricri
dedicated flight trainer version (2 built)
CFA D.7 Cricri Major
An enlarged CriCri with enclosed cabin, powered by a 90 hp (67 kW) Salmson 5Aq-01 5-cylinder radial.

== Specifications (D6) ==
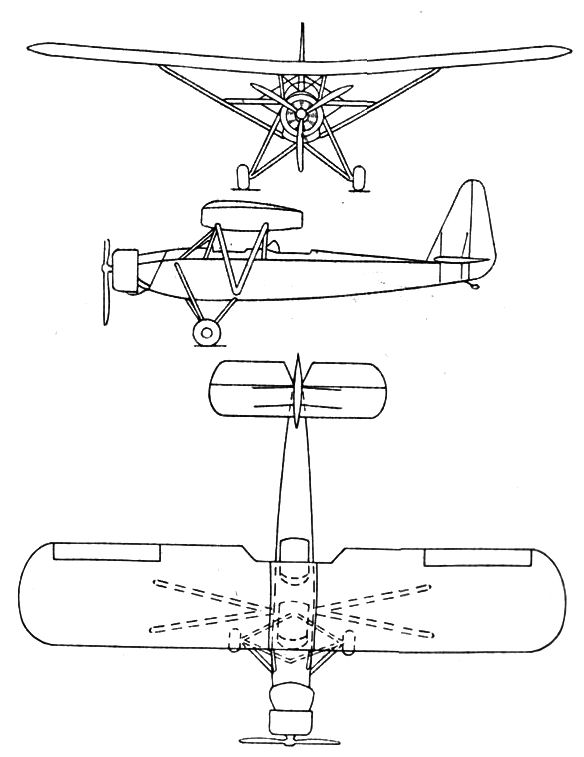
Salmson CriCri 3-view drawing from L'Aerophile February 1938

Data from Aviafrance

General characteristics

- Crew: One pilot
- Capacity: 1 passenger
- Length: 6.89 m (22 ft 7 in)
- Wingspan: 9.66 m (31 ft 8 in)
- Height: 2.18 m (7 ft 2 in)
- Wing area: 16.0 m^{2} (172 sq ft)
- Empty weight: 287 kg (633 lb)
- Gross weight: 575 kg (1,268 lb)
- Powerplant: 1 × Salmson 9 ADr , 45 kW (60 hp)

Performance

- Maximum speed: 150 km/h (94 mph, 82 kn)
- Range: 500 km (310 mi, 270 nmi)
- Service ceiling: 2,450 m (8,040 ft)

== Bibliography ==
- Le Roy, Thierry (November 1997). "Courrier des Lecteurs" [Readers Mail]. Avions: Toute l'aéronautique et son histoire (in French) (56): 2–3. ISSN 1243-8650.
- Taylor, Michael J. H. (1989). Jane's Encyclopedia of Aviation. London: Studio Editions. p. 251.
- Simpson, R. W. (1995). Airlife's General Aviation. Shrewsbury: Airlife Publishing. p. 410.
