= Salmson Randonnée =

French luxury car

Salmson Randonnée G-72
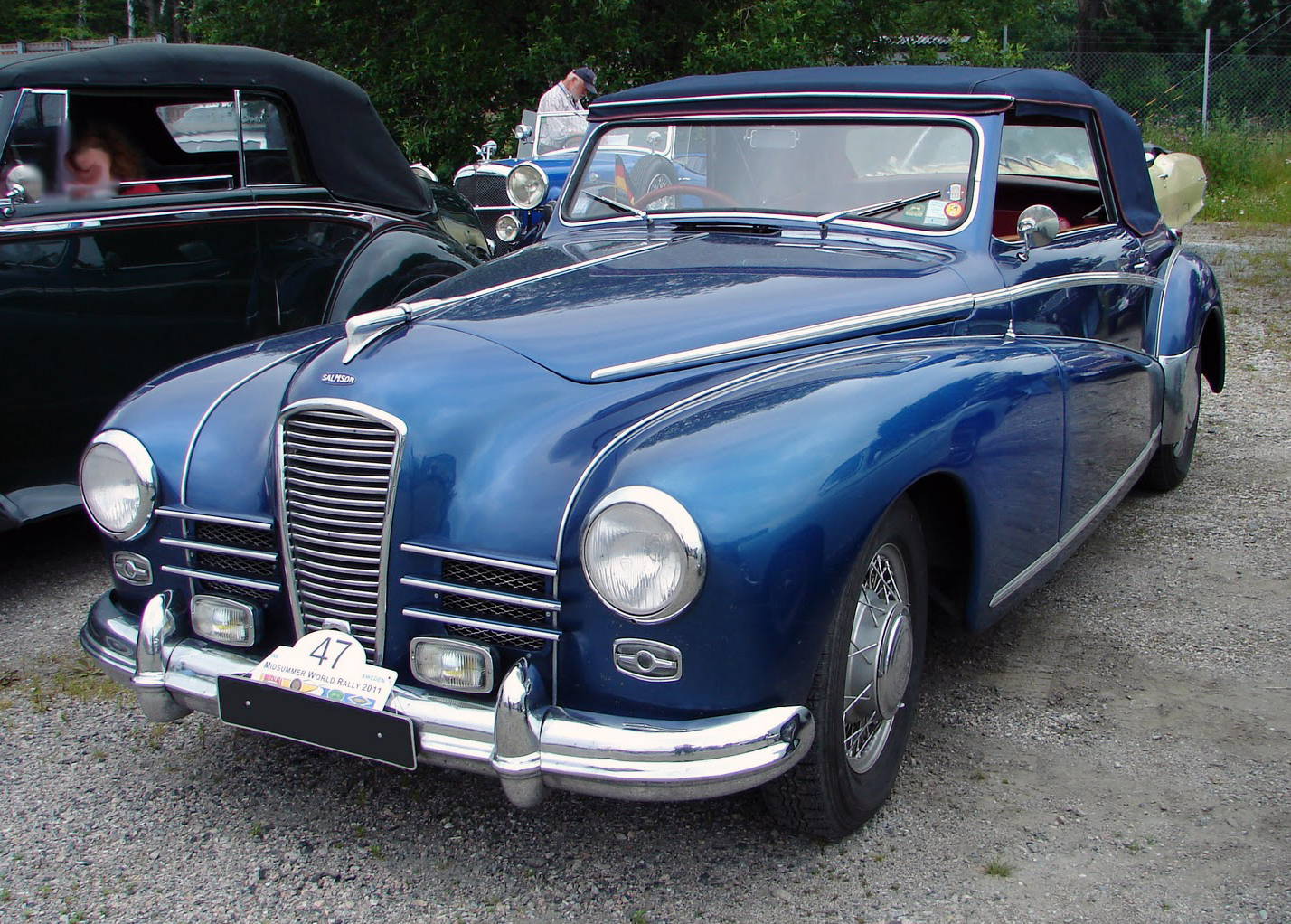

Overview
- Manufacturer: Société des Moteurs Salmson
- Also called: Salmson Randonnée E-72 (1950-1951)
- Production: October 1951-1954; 507 cars
- Assembly: Boulogne-Billancourt

Body and chassis
- Body style: 4 door saloon, cabriolet
- Layout: FR layout

Powertrain
- Engine: 2218 cc straight-4
- Transmission: 4-speed “Cotal”

Dimensions
- Wheelbase: 3,000 mm (120 in)
- Length: 4,610 mm (181 in)
- Width: 1,710 mm (67 in)
- Height: 1,570 mm (62 in)
- Curb weight: 1,350 kg (2,980 lb)

The Salmson Randonnée is a luxury car produced by Société des Moteurs Salmson from Autumn 1950 until 1954. It was introduced as the Randonnée E-72, but in February 1951 this was superseded by the broadly similar Randonnée G-72.

== The engine ==
The alloy inline-four-cylinder engine was of 2218 cc which placed it firmly in the 13CV taxation class. This attracted a high annual taxation charge for owners resident in France. Another unusual feature of the engine, which may have reflected its manufacturer’s expertise in aircraft manufacture, was its twin overhead camshaft.

The body was of wood and metal, resting on a traditional separate chassis.

== The body ==
In 1952 the coachbuilder Esclassan exhibited a special bodied cabriolet version based on the Randonnée but inspired by the General Motors “Le Sabre” dream car. Two cars were constructed but have since been destroyed.

== Commercial ==
Government taxation policy combined with post war austerity to kill off several French auto-makers at this time, and Salmson’s experience was typical. The company produced 1,162 cars in 1950, 817 in 1951 and just 89 in 1952. By the time of the 1952 Paris Motor Show the Randonnée was the only model featured, with two cars crammed onto a very small stand, being either a sedan and a cabriolet, both unchanged since the previous year. By now the company had been obliged to enter into bankruptcy in 1951, only to be rescued by Jacques Bernard in 1952. There were high hopes of a new direction and a better future, but by 1954 the company had been forced out of car making.

== The smaller Randonnée that never appeared ==
French taxation policy strongly discouraged cars with engines sizes of above 2-litres at this time, and Salmson scheduled the appearance at the Paris Motor Show in October 1952 of a car based on the Randonnée but modernised, slightly smaller, and featuring an engine that would place it in the 10CV taxation class. Unfortunately the financial difficulties that the manufacturer was experiencing meant that the 10CV Randonnée, which would have replaced the no longer produced Salmson S4-61 L, never made it to the show, and plans to produce the 10CV car were never implemented.

== Cinema ==
A Salmson Randonnée featured in the 1995 movie Une femme française produced by Régis Wargnier

== Sources and further reading ==
- Salmson. La belle mécanique française, par Claude et Laurent Chevalier, édition E.T.A.I., 2010. ISBN 978-2-7268-8988-6
