= Salmson S4 =

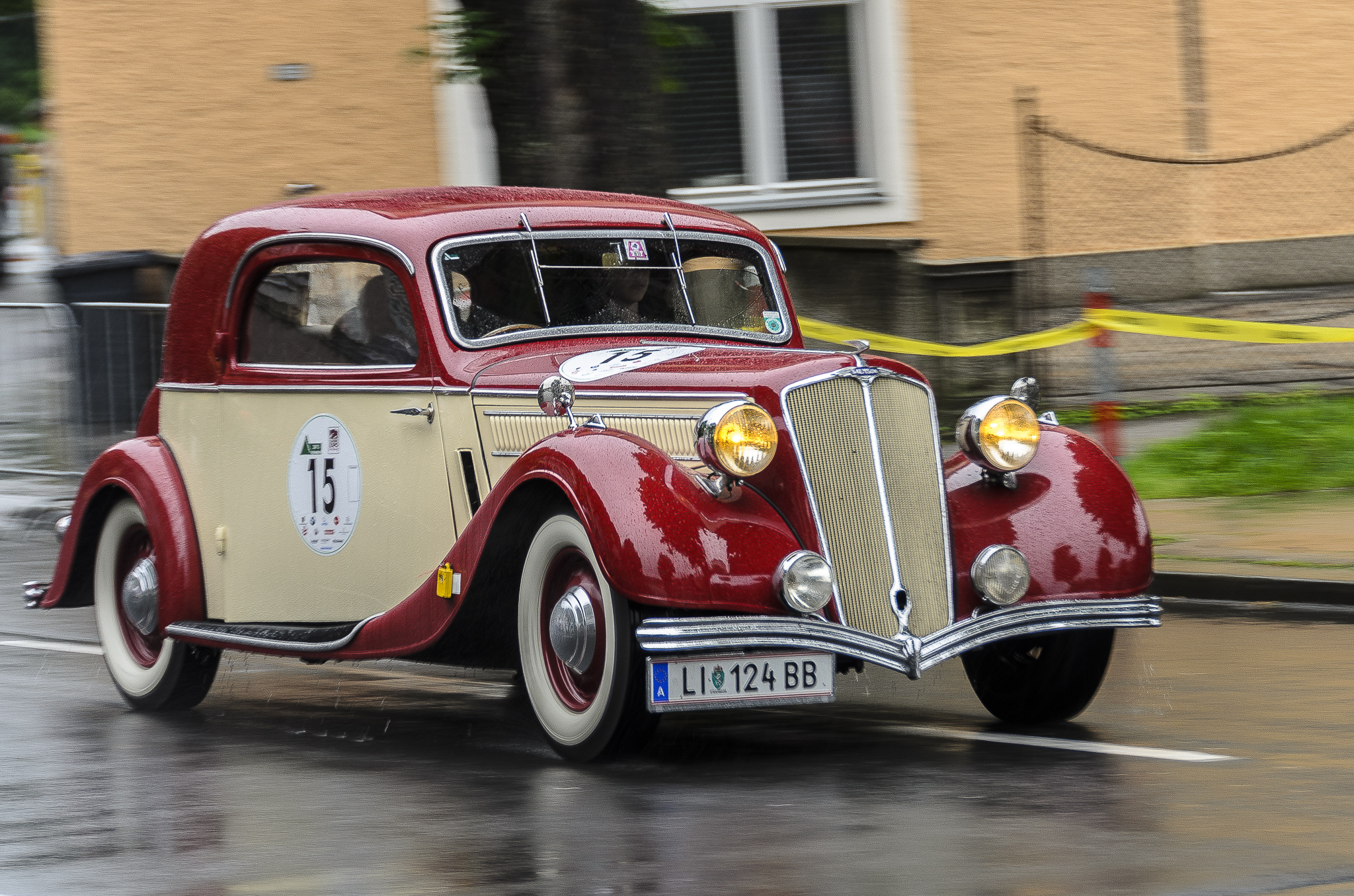
- Salmson S4E

Overview
- Manufacturer: Société des Moteurs Salmson
- Also called: Salmson S4-C (1932–1934); Salmson S4-D (1934–1936); Salmson S4-DA (1936–1939); Salmson S4-61 (1938–1942, 1946–1952); Salmson S4-E (1937–1942, 1946–1951)
- Production: 1932–1942, 1946–1951
- Assembly: Boulogne-Billancourt

Body and chassis
- Body style: Various, including 4-door berline (saloon/sedan), cabriolet, Roadster
- Layout: FR layout

Powertrain
- Engine: 1465 cc twin cam I4 (1932~1934); 1596 cc twin cam I4 (~1934–1936); 1731 cc twin cam I4 (1936–1952); 2312 cc twin cam I4 (1937–1951)
- Transmission: 4-speed "Cotal Preselector transmission" optional from May 1934

Dimensions
- Wheelbase: 2,890 mm (114 in) (S4C: 1932~1934); 2,850 mm (112 in) (S4D: ~1934–1952)); 3,000 mm (120 in) (S4E: 1937–1951))

The Salmson S4 is a mid-size executive-level car introduced as the Salmson S4 C by Société des Moteurs Salmson in Autumn 1932. It was the manufacturer's principal and often sole model for the next twenty years.

The car's 1465 cc four-cylinder engine initially placed it in the 8CV car tax band, which would have placed it alongside lower-priced cars such as the Peugeot 301 and the Renault Monaquatre, but the Salmson's levels of technical sophistication and equipment, as well as its price, indicated that it was intended for a more aspirational clientele than those comparably sized cars. Within a few years the S4's four-cylinder engine had in any event increased in size to a point where the car sat in the 10CV car tax band, which moved the S4 up half a class as well as providing customers with a more convincing level of performance.

The engines grew and the range widened. A 2.3-litre variant, the Salmson S4 E joined the less powerful car (by now itself having evolved into the Salmson S4 DA) in October 1937. The war disrupted production, which probably stopped completely after a major bomb attack conducted by the British on 3 March 1942. Post war production resumed (or continued), albeit at feeble levels, of the four-cylinder (10CV) Salmson S4-61 till April 1952, by which date production of the 13CV Salmson S4 E had already come to an end.

== Origins ==
Salmson had emerged as an automobile manufacturer between 1919 and 1922, having already become well established in the aviation business, initially as an aircraft manufacturer and specialising more recently in aircraft engines. Moving quickly beyond the British designed cyclecars, with which the post-war automobile business had started, during the mid-1920s the manufacturer specialised in small cars with technically advanced features such as a twin overhead camshaft and overhead valves for the car engines.

In October 1928 the manufacturer had staged a surprise at the Motor Show, presenting the "Salmson Type S" with a small 6-cylinder 9 CV engine incorporating, as on Salmson's existing 4-cylinder engines, a twin overhead camshaft. From the outside the car could be distinguished from Salmson's existing four-cylinder cars only by the "Six" logo in the centre of the front grille. The year before the Great Depression may not have been the best time for the manufacturer to push upmarket, and the "Type S" did not sell in huge numbers. It nevertheless can be seen as a precursor to the Salmson S4 that appeared (with a four-cylinder engine) in 1932.

The Salmson S4 both inherited and reinforced the company's strong technical reputation.

== Model evolution ==
=== Salmson S4-C 8CV (1932–1934?) ===
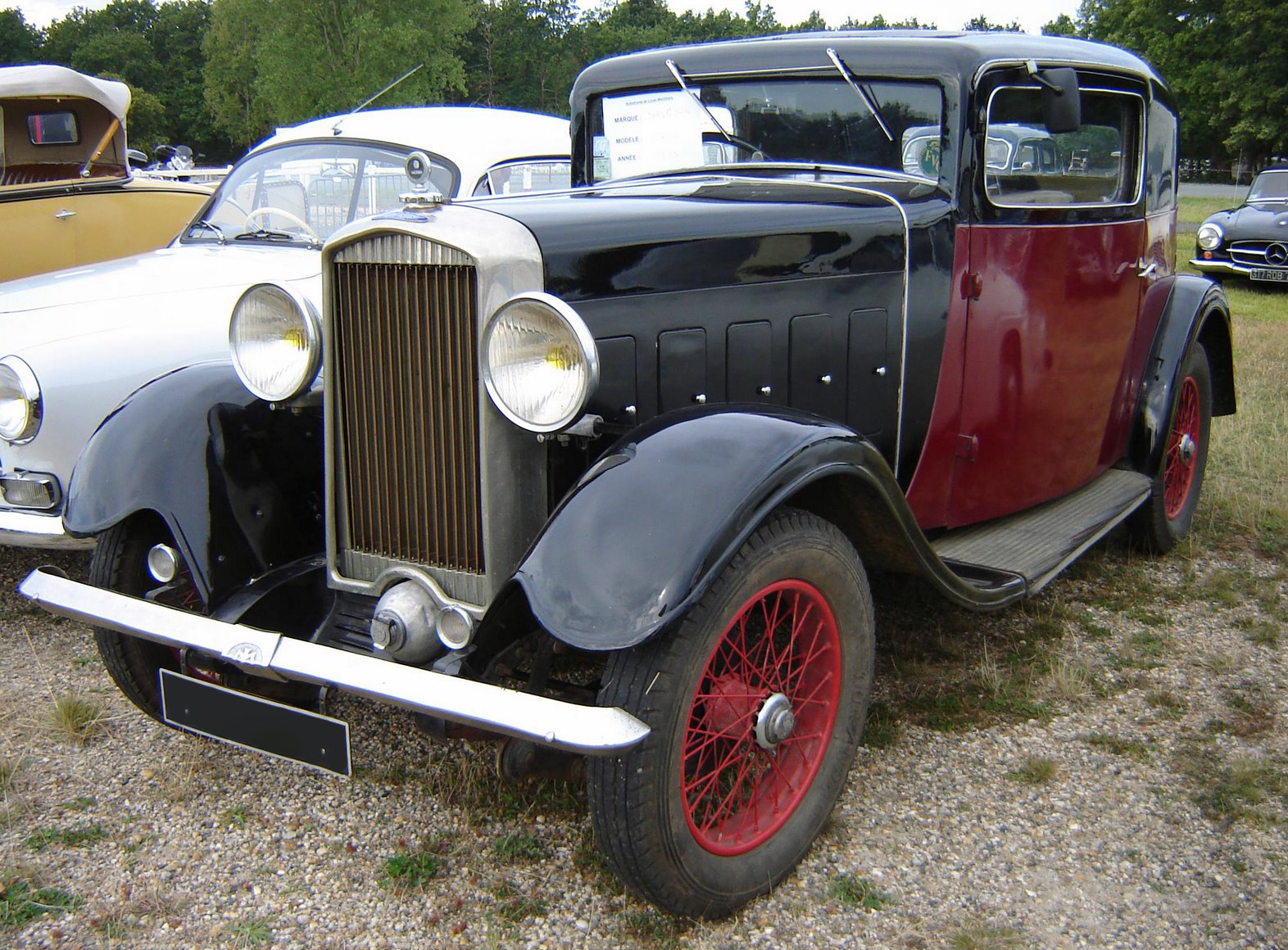
A 1933 Salmson S4C faux cabriolet at Montlhéry

The car was launched in the autumn of 1932 with a 4-cylinder 1465 cc (8CV) engine for which a maximum output of 41 hp (30 kW) at 3,800 rpm was claimed, supporting a listed top speed of 110 km/h (68 mph). The unit was unusual, for the time, in that it incorporated a twin overhead camshaft. It also used a dual-direction magneto coil that doubled as a starter motor, as well as a 12-volt electrical system.

Power passed to the rear wheels using a classic 4-speed manual transmission. However, from May 1934 it became possible to specify, at extra cost, a "Cotal Preselector transmission". Suspension was based on rigid axles front and back with longitudinal leaf springs, semi-elliptic at the front and attached using demi-cantilevers at the back.

At the 27th Paris Motor show in October 1933 the car was priced by the manufacturer at 21,950 francs in bare chassis form. The manufacturer's inventiveness was more apparent under the bonnet than in respect of the body options, which were typically conventional at best: the car incorporated a flat grille at the front, which by 1933 was perceived by some a little old fashioned. The 2,890 mm (114 in) wheelbase chassis was also offered with a selection of standard bodies that included a 2-door "Faux Cabriolet" four-seater body priced at 29,900 francs, a four-seater, two-door "Coach Lumineux" at 30,950 francs, a four-door "Berline" (sedan/saloon) at 31,650 francs, a sports-bodied "Roadster" at 31,450 francs, and a "Cabriolet" at 33,500 francs. Also listed was a "berline alongė" (lengthened sedan/saloon) at 31,950 francs.

=== Salmson S4-D 10CV (1934?–1936) ===
With the Salmson S4 D, likely introduced in 1934, the engine size was increased to 1596 cc. The tax horsepower ratio went up from 8 to 10 CV.

=== Salmson S4-DA 10CV (1936–1938) ===
In October 1936, with several thousand Salmson S4's sold over the previous two years, the manufacturer used the Motor Show to launch a further upgrade. The four-cylinder engine retained its twin overhead camshafts, and the length of the piston stroke was unchanged, but a further increase in cylinder bore (diameter) provided for a further increase in capacity, now to 1731 cc. The cylinder head now featured hemispherical piston heads and centrally positioned spark plugs, which gave the engine a level of responsiveness not normally associated with a 10CV engine. The car shared its place in the 10CV tax band with the recently introduced Peugeot 302. Where comparably bodied versions existed, however, the Salmson S4 DA was nevertheless priced approximately 50% higher than the Peugeot 302: there was evidently no need for Salmson to compete on price with the volume automakers.

By now the S4 had acquired independent front suspension, using a transverse leaf spring. The back wheels were, as before, attached to a rigid axle suspended with longitudinal leaf springs.

At the 30th Paris Motor show in October 1936 the car was offered in bare chassis form at 24,000 francs. A four-seater 2-door "coupė" bodied car was priced at 31,500 francs while the sedan/saloon bodied car – now described not as a "berline" but with the more traditional term "conduite intėrieur" came in at 32,800 francs. As before, the saloon/sedan bodied car had a sedate old fashioned appearance that offered no hint of the modern technology underneath. The "roadster" was priced at 35,500 francs and the four seater cabriolet at 35,900 francs. In every case, the price included a four-speed manual transmission (brought in from Delahaye), but for an extra 1,500 francs customers could specify a "Cotal Preselector transmission".

In the immediate aftermath of the economic depression that hat hit western economies in the aftermath of the 1929 Wall Street crash, price inflation had gone into reverse and the domestic purchasing power of the French currency had begun to increase. The mid 1930s saw renewed economic paralysis in France, however, and during the second half of the decade price inflation returned with a vengeance. The Salmson S4-DA which the manufacturer had adverstized in bare chassis form for 24,000 francs in October 1936 was priced, in January 1938, at 31,200 francs: there were equivalent price increases for cars with bodies fitted.

=== Salmson S4 E 13CV (1937–1951) ===
The star of the Salmson stand at the 31st Paris Motor Show in October 1937 could have been the Salmson S4-E. The car's four-cylinder 2312 cc power unit extended the S4 range upwards, into the 13CV category. In fact, the car was placed at the far end of the stand without fanfare and without any accompanying publicity campaign, so that many visitors to the show likely missed it completely.

The S4-E incorporated the technically advanced features of the S4 DA such as an engine with twin overhead camshaft, hemispherical piston heads with the centrally positioned spark plugs. The chassis featured rack and pinion steering, with independent suspension at the front. However, the front suspension was now refined through the addition of longitudinal torsion bars, an approach probably copied from the Citroën Traction that had appeared the year before. Commentators noted that the new engine and suspension enhancements gave rise to a combination of performance and road-holding that was among the best in class for the time. Another novelty for the S4-E was a hydraulically controlled brake circuit in place of the then conventional mechanical linkage.

The wheelbase was extended by 15 cm (5.9 in). Three standard bodies were offered. The "faux-cabriolet" (rebaptised "coupé" in October 1938) 2-door four seater was listed in October 1937 at 49,800 francs. The Berline, still listed as a "conduite-interieure" bodied car was priced at 50,900 francs. The rear doors on this car were hinged at the back: when two doors on the same side were opened there was no central pillar to impede access. The four-seater cabriolet was priced at 54,800 francs. As on the 4-cylinder S4-DA, customers were able to choose between a classic 4-speed manual transmission and a “Cotal Preselector transmission", but whereas S4 DA customers were expected to pay an extra 2,000 francs for the Cotal option, the Cotal transmission was now offered at no additional cost to S4 E buyers.

=== Salmson S4-61 10CV (1938–1942, 1946–1952) ===
The Salmson S4-61 replaced the S4 DA for 1939. Technically very little changed.

== Second World War ==
The technically sophisticated S4 was too complicated to interest the military and the manufacturer's Billancourt factory was too small to be listed for a switch-over to war production. Production seems to have been drastically scaled back, during the early years of the war, but sources are vague on the extent and nature of any manufacturing activity, which presumably was further inhibited by the British bombing of the plant on 3 March 1942. At the end of the war, however, it was single-seater racing cars based on the chassis of the Salmson S4-61 that were supplied for the activities of the "Union Sportif automobile" which launched a competition driving school in 1945. This venture did not endure beyond 1946, but the Salmson S4-61 did survive the war.

== Postwar ==
Salmson S4 production 1946–1949 (S4-61 and S4-E combined totals):

1946 – 75
1947 – 143
1948 – 336
1949 – 835

In 1946 production of the S4 resumed, and it continued till 1952. Volumes were low, however, reflecting the dire state of the French economy. By 1950 volumes were beginning to recover, and even after the launch of a complementary model it is clear that many of the 817 Salmsons produced in 1951 will have been S4s. However, in 1951 the bank withdrew financial support from the company after which it was placed in a form of administration. Automobile production was run down, with the last S4s produced in April 1952.

== British Salmson ==
The S4-C was also produced by British Salmson as a 12 HP model. Following the Great Depression, Britain left the Gold Standard, which for practical purposes involved a sudden and massive devaluation for the British currency. This boosted the British auto-industry, but it also meant that importing French cars to Britain was no longer profitable.

By the time of the Second World War the British Salmson affiliate had developed local versions of the S4-D as well as a 6-cylinder S6-D (of which there was no French equivalent).

A British Salmson S4-61 cabriolet can be seen in the television series Agatha Christie's Marple in episode 2 of series 1, "The Murder at the Vicarage", at the 9' 39" mark, and subsequently several times in the episode.

== Sources and further reading ==
- Salmson. La belle mécanique française, par Claude et Laurent Chevalier, édition E.T.A.I., 2010.
