= British Salmson =

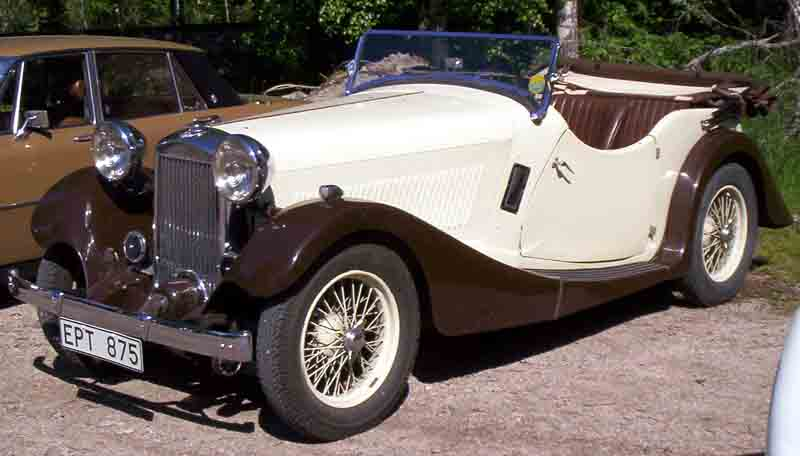
- 1935 British Salmson 12/70 S4C
- Industry: Automotive
- Founded: 1929
- Fate: Defunct
- Headquarters: Raynes Park, London, England
- Products: Aero engines, Cars, Printing machinery
- Parent: Salmson

British Salmson was a British based manufacturer of cars, from 1934 to 1939. An offshoot of the French Salmson company, it was taken over by local management. After producing war supplies during World War II, it ceased car production, moved to Glasgow, Scotland, and produced printing machinery.

== Foundation ==
In 1929, the French Salmson company started a British branch company, Moteurs Salmson in Raynes Park, London, as a radial aero engine maker for the British Empire market. Taken over by British sports car racer Howard Martineau and investors in 1930, they renamed it British Salmson Aero Engines Ltd and continued production under licence.

As aero engine sales proved slow, the company extended the licence deal to include local production of cars from 1934.

== Production ==
=== S4C ===
The British S4C had the same twin-overhead-camshaft, 1471 cc, four-cylinder engine and chassis as its French parent, but the gearbox was updated to include synchromesh on the top two ratios. The coachwork was to a British design and was available in four-door saloon, sports saloon, open tourer and drophead coupé versions bought in from Ranalah or Newns. Two engines were offered, the single carburettor 12/55 and the tuned, twin carburettor 12/70. The latter was claimed to take the car to 80 mph (130 km/h). About 230 are estimated to have been made.

=== S4D ===
In 1937 the engine was enlarged to 1596 cc and the car became the S4D. Hydraulic brakes and transverse spring independent front suspension were fitted. The new car was heavier than the superseded S4C and in spite of the larger engine, there was no significant increase in performance. A curved back saloon and drophead coupé were offered. About 75 were made, production stopping in 1938.

=== S6D ===
The S6D or 20/90 of 1936 to 1939 had no French equivalent. The engine was a six-cylinder unit of 2580 cc, still with twin overhead cams and the car was available as either Sports Saloon, 2-seater sports or drophead coupé. A maximum speed of nearly 90 mph (140 km/h) was claimed. Bendix cable brakes were fitted to the first few cars but later ones had Lockheed hydraulics. About 15 were made up to the outbreak of war.

== World War 2 and beyond ==
At the outbreak of World War II, car production ceased and the company became a general engineering company, producing components and sub-assemblies for other manufacturers.

Car production did not restart after the war, but a few small 31 cc engines for converting bicycles were made. The company eventually moved to Glasgow, Scotland, where they made printing machinery.

== See also ==
- List of aircraft engine manufacturers
- List of car manufacturers of the United Kingdom
