= Hanriot H.26 =

HD.26
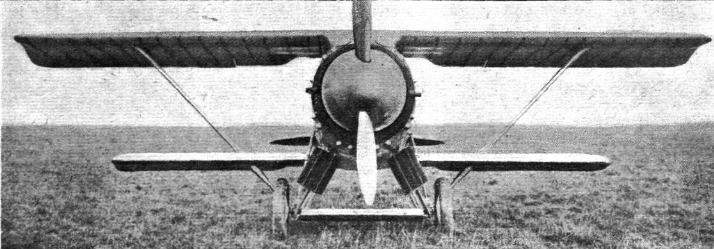

General information
- Type: Single seat shipboard fighter aircraft
- National origin: France
- Manufacturer: Aeroplanes Hanriot et Cie
- Number built: 1

History
- First flight: 1923

The Hanriot H.26 was a French single seat fighter aircraft prototype completed in 1923. Only one was built.

== Design and development ==
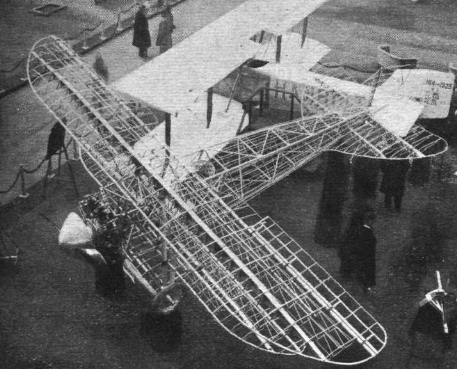
The H.26 before covering at the Paris Aero Show December 1922, with early wings

The H.26 (the first Hanriot fighter that did not use the HD nomenclature, where the D was for their long-standing designer Emile Dupont) was intended for the 1921 C1 (single seat Chasseur or fighter) programme competition. Most participants used the 300 hp (224 kW) V-8 Hispano-Suiza 8F engine, with its low frontal area. Instead, the H.26 used a lower power, 260 hp (194 kW) water cooled Salmson 9Z 9-cylinder radial engine. The H.26 aimed to redress the balance by aerodynamic cleanliness, with few interplane struts, flying wires or exposed cabane struts.

It was an all-metal single bay sesquiplane, fabric covered except for the fuselage ahead of the cockpit. The gap between the wings was small and the stagger marked. The lower wing was conventionally mounted at the bottom of the fuselage and the upper planes, built in separate pieces, braced close to the upper fuselage on short, faired extensions. In section the wings were aerodynamically thick and strongly cambered. There were ailerons only on the upper plane, the plan, structure and bracing of which was greatly altered during 1923. When the H.26 made its first public appearance, at the Paris Aero Show in December 1922, the still uncovered upper wing of the unflown fighter had long, gently curved tips outboard of a straight edged, constant chord central section and had a single main spar. Sixteen months later, after the aircraft had flown, the wings had become rectangular and were built around two spars. The short span lower wing retained its single spar structure throughout but it, too, had curved tips replaced with square. The wing bracing had also changed: originally a bracing wire ran from the rear undercarriage structure upwards and outwards, via the lower to the upper wing. This was replaced by a single, wide chord rigid strut with an aerofoil section and widened at its roots.

The closely cowled radial engine set the diameter of the H.26's short nose and drove a two blade propeller behind a very large diameter domed spinner. The Salmson was initially cooled with a semi-circular Botali radiator to the rear of the engine but this proved ineffective and was replaced with a pair of Chaussons, one on each forward undercarriage leg. The H.26 had a fixed conventional undercarriage with mainwheels on a centrally hinged split axle, enclosed within a lift-contributing wing-like fairing and supported by N-form struts attached to the lower fuselage longerons on each side. Originally, these were reinforced by long vertical struts from the shock absorber attachments to the upper wing central section. These were discarded when the interplane wires were replaced by the faired interplane struts, which extended downwards to the rear undercarriage structure; the tops of the shock absorber struts were relocated to mid-fuselage on the engine mounting.

The pilot's cockpit, with a faired headrest behind it, was at the trailing edge of the upper wing, placed within a small cut-out to improve his limited view. The H.26 had a fuselage built around four metal tube, cross-braced longerons, enclosed within metal formers and stringers to shape it into an oval cross-section. Behind him the fuselage tapered to the broad chord fixed tail surfaces. The mid-fuselage tailplane, which had a strongly swept leading edge, carried round tipped elevators that narrowed inboard. The vertical tail was oval shaped, with a broad chord rudder that ended at the top of the fuselage.

The H.26 was first flown from Orly in 1923. Initially troubled by engine overheating, it proved to have handling problems and a poor view for the pilot; despite the modifications, its test programme was soon abandoned.

== Specifications ==
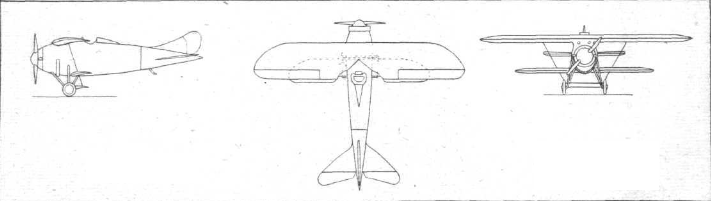
3-view of the H.26 published early 1923, showing early wing plan, wire bracing and a different vertical tail to those of 1924.

Data from Green & Swanborough p.279

General characteristics

- Crew: One
- Length: 7.35 m (24 ft 1 in)
- Wingspan: 9.05 m (29 ft 8 in)
- Height: 2.50 m (8 ft 2 in)
- Wing area: 18.00 m^{2} (193.8 sq ft)
- Empty weight: 820 kg (1,808 lb)
- Gross weight: 1,150 kg (2,535 lb)
- Powerplant: 1 × Salmson 9Z 9-cylinder water-cooled radial engine, 190 kW (260 hp)
- Propellers: 2-bladed

Performance

- Maximum speed: 260 km/h (160 mph, 140 kn) at sea level. All performance figures are the maker's estimates.
- Range: 750 km (470 mi, 400 nmi)
- Service ceiling: 8,500 m (27,900 ft)
