= CFA D.7 Cricri Major =

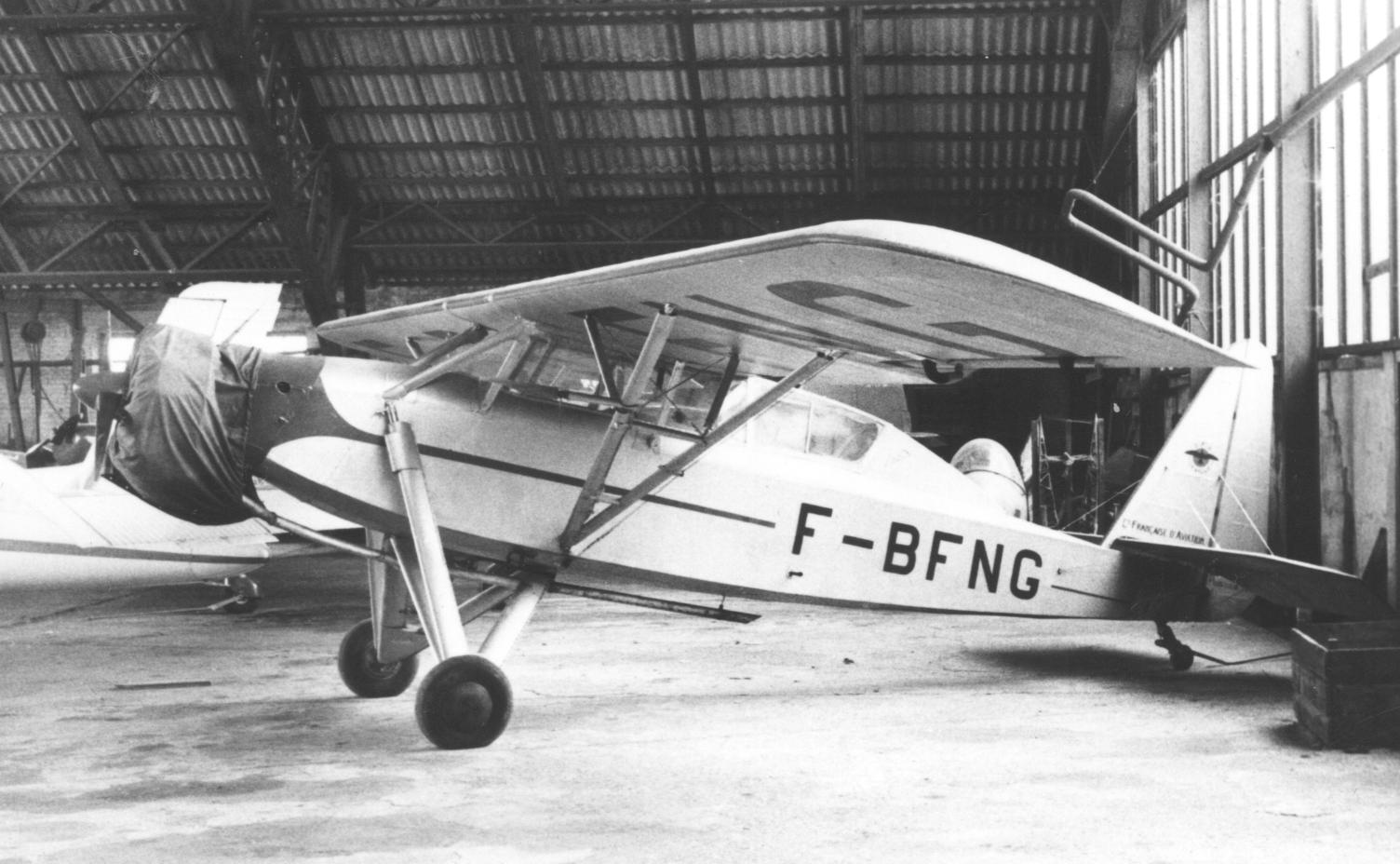
- CFA-built Cricri Major airworthy at Pontoise airfield near Paris in June 1967

General information
- Type: light civil aircraft
- National origin: France
- Manufacturer: Compagnie Francaise d'Aviation
- Primary user: aero clubs and private pilots
- Number built: 10

History
- First flight: 15 March 1949
- Developed from: Salmson Cricri

The CFA D.7 Cricri Major was a French-built light civil aircraft of the 1940s.

== Development ==
The CFA D.7 Cricri Major was a postwar-built light high-wing monoplane with enclosed two-seat tandem glazed cabin and a fixed tail-wheel undercarriage, powered by a Salmson 5Aq-01 radial engine.

== Operational history ==
An initial series of ten Cricri (Cricket) Majors was completed and these were bought by aero clubs and private pilots. The design was rather outdated and no further examples were completed. Four D.7s remained in service in 1956 and one, F-BFNG remained airworthy in 1967. This aircraft has been restored to airworthiness and was operational in 2005.

== Specifications ==
Data from Green, 1956, p.45

General characteristics

- Crew: 1
- Capacity: 1 passenger
- Length: 23 ft 3 in (7.09 m)
- Wingspan: 35 ft 11 in (10.95 m)
- Height: 8 ft 6 in (2.59 m)
- Wing area: 200 sq ft (18.58 m^{2})
- Empty weight: 1,023 lb (464 kg)
- Gross weight: 1,585 lb (719 kg)
- Powerplant: 1 × Salmson 5Aq-01 5-cylinder radial , 90 hp (67 kW)

Performance

- Maximum speed: 93 mph (150 km/h, 81 kn)
- Cruise speed: 80 mph (129 km/h, 70 kn)
- Range: 312 mi (500 km, 271 nmi)
- Service ceiling: 13,120 ft (4,000 m)
