= Desfontaines =

Desfontaines is a surname. Notable people with the surname include:

- François-Georges Fouques Deshayes (known as Desfontaines-Lavallée or Desfontaines, 1733-1825), French writer and playwright.
- Henri Desfontaines (1876-1931), French film director, actor and scriptwriter
- Jean Desfontaines (c. 1658–1752), French Baroque composer
- Pierre Desfontaines (1685-1745), French journalist
- René Louiche Desfontaines (1750-1833), French botanist

== See also ==
- Deffontaines
