= Hanriot H.33 =

H.33

General information
- Type: Two seat fighter aircraft
- National origin: France
- Manufacturer: Avions Hanriot
- Number built: 1

History
- First flight: 1926

The Hanriot H.33 was a French biplane 2-seat fighter aircraft built in 1926, derived from the Hanriot H.31. It was not successful and only one prototype was completed.

== Specifications ==
Data from

General characteristics

- Crew: Two
- Length: 7.56 m (24 ft 10 in)
- Wingspan: 12.58 m (41 ft 3 in)
- Height: 3.50 m (11 ft 6 in)
- Wing area: 38.50 m^{2} (414.4 sq ft)
- Empty weight: 1,122 kg (2,474 lb)
- Gross weight: 1,893 kg (4,173 lb)
- Powerplant: 1 × Salmson 18Ab 18-cylinder 2-row water-cooled in-line radial engine, 370 kW (500 hp)
- Propellers: 2-bladed

Performance

- Maximum speed: 235 km/h (146 mph, 127 kn)
- Range: 580 km (360 mi, 310 nmi)
- Service ceiling: 8,000 m (26,000 ft)

Armament

- Guns: *2 × fixed, forward firing synchronised 7.7 mm (0.303 in) Vickers machine guns in the forward fuselage
- 2 × fixed, forward firing 7.5 mm (0.295 in) Darne machine guns in the port and starboard wings
- 2 x flexibly mounted 7.7 mm (0.303 in) Lewis guns in the rear cockpit
