= Salmson-Moineau S.M.1 =

French reconnaissance aircraft

S.M.1 A3
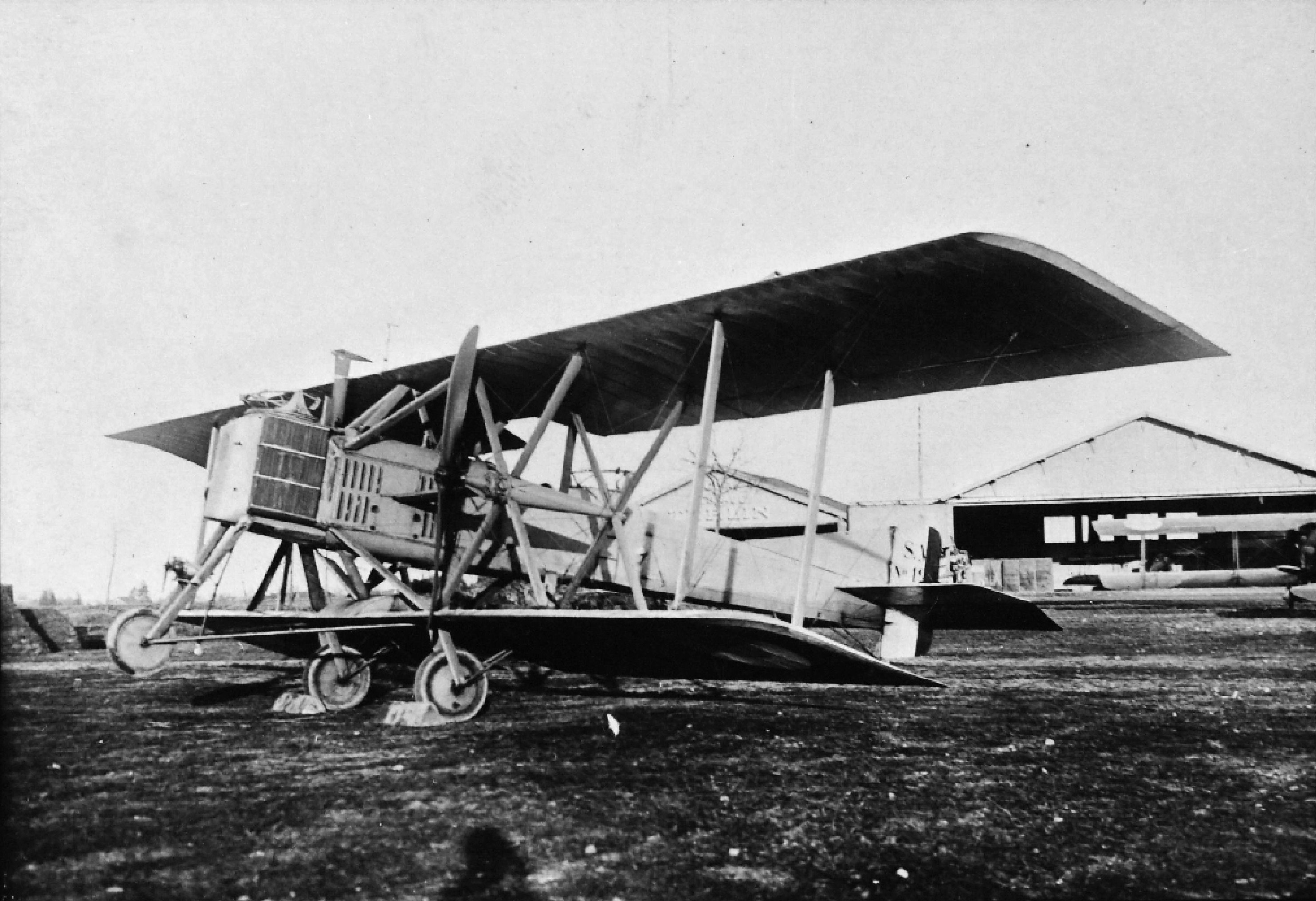

General information
- Type: 3-seater reconnaissance aircraft
- National origin: France
- Manufacturer: Salmson-Moineau
- Designer: René Moineau
- Number built: ca. 155

History
- First flight: 1916

The Salmson-Moineau S.M.1 A3, (later re-designated Salmson Sal. 1 A3), was a French armed three-seat biplane long range reconnaissance aircraft of the First World War designed by René Moineau for the Salmson company.

== Design and development ==
The S.M.1 A3 was developed from 1915 to meet the French military A3 specification, which called for a three-seat long range reconnaissance aircraft with strong defensive armament. The S.M.1 was unconventional, powered by a single Salmson 9A liquid-cooled radial engine mounted in the fuselage powering two airscrews mounted between the wings with a system of gears and drive shafts. This layout was chosen by Moineau to minimise drag. The twin airscrew layout allowed a wide field of fire for the two gunner-observers, one seated in the nose and one behind the pilot. Both gunners operated ring-mounted flexible 37 mm APX cannon built by Arsenal Puteaux. The airframe itself was relatively conventional, the boxy fuselage mounted on a system of struts between the wings. The undercarriage included a nose wheel, intended solely to prevent the aircraft nosing over, and a tail skid.

One aircraft may have been fitted experimentally with a Salmson (Canton-Unne) P.9 engine. A single S.M.2 S2 aircraft, with an additional Salmson 9A engine in the nose driving a conventional tractor airscrew, was tested with poor results, due to inadequate engine cooling, in 1918.

== Operational history ==
The aircraft was tested in early 1916 and was sufficiently successful to receive an order for 100 aircraft although the performance was inferior to the Sopwith 1½ Strutter. In service the S.M.1 was not successful. The nose-wheel undercarriage would collapse if misused and this caused many accidents. The complicated transmission system was difficult to service in the field and the performance of the aircraft was poor. It appears that around 155 S.M.1s were built in total. The type was largely withdrawn from service in 1917 but a small number of aircraft remained in use until late 1918. Some S.M.1s were supplied to the Imperial Russian Air Service, but they were no better liked in Russia.

== Operators ==
France

- French Air Force

Russia

- Imperial Russian Air Service

== Variants ==
S.M.1 A3
The production 3-seat reconnaissance aircraft, powered by a single Salmson 9A2c radial engine laterally mounted in the fuselage driving two propellers via shafts and gearboxes.
S.M.2 S2
An enlarged S.M.1, for the S2 2-seater ground attack role, with extended upper wings with additional bracing, reinforced undercarriage and a second Salmson 9A2c in the nose driving a 2-bladed tractor propeller directly.

== Specifications (S.M.1 A3) ==
Data from

General characteristics

- Crew: 3
- Length: 10 m (32 ft 10 in)
- Wingspan: 17.475 m (57 ft 4 in)
- Height: 3.8 m (12 ft 6 in)
- Wing area: 70 m^{2} (750 sq ft)
- Gross weight: 2,050 kg (4,519 lb)
- Powerplant: 1 × Salmson 9A2c 9-cyl. water-cooled radial piston engine, 180 kW (240 hp)
- Propellers: 2-bladed fixed pitch propellers, one each side driven by shafts via gearboxes

Performance

- Endurance: 3 hours

Armament
