= Hanriot H.31 =

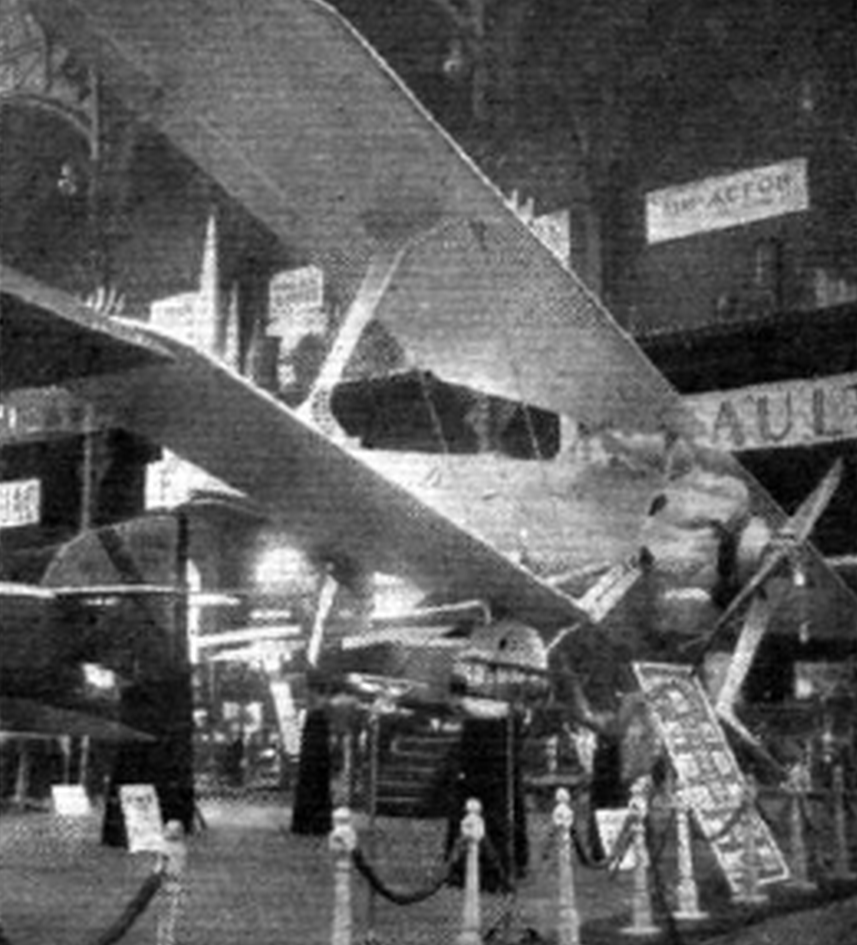
- As yet unflown at the 1924 Paris Aero Show

General information
- Type: Single seat fighter aircraft
- National origin: France
- Manufacturer: Avions Hanriot
- Number built: 1

History
- First flight: 1925

The Hanriot H.31 was a single engine, single seat French biplane fighter aircraft built in 1925 to compete in a government programme. It was not successful and only one prototype was completed.

== Design and development ==
The Hanrot H.31 was designed to participate in the 1923 competitive C1 (single seat Chasseur or fighter) programme, which specified engines in the power range 300-370 kW (400-500 hp). Hanriot selected a 370 kW Salmson 18Cm 18-cylinder double row water-cooled radial engine. This 1923 call attracted an unusually large number of competing designs.

The H.31 was a single bay biplane with straight edged, parallel chord wings with slight sweep and essentially no stagger; the leading edge of the lower wing was marginally behind that of the upper one because its chord was a little less. It also had a slightly smaller span. A single, wide chord, airfoil section interplane strut on each side, with widened roots to lower interference drag, separated the bays; on each side pairs of flying wires and landing wires provided cross bracing between these struts and the fuselage. The wings were built around twin Duralumin box main spars, with metal and wood ribs. There were ailerons on the upper planes. Neither wing was directly fuselage mounted but instead held off by pairs of N-form struts on each side. Those joining the lower wing to the low-mid fuselage were longer than those of the cabane and the lower forward component was itself a close pair. Both upper and lower wings had the common cut-outs to improve the pilot's vision but the H.31 had a forward, full chord slot between the upper wings as well.

The Salmson engine was close cowled with fairings over each cylinder and drove a two blade propeller. It was cooled with an Andre radiator mounted ventrally in the space between the fuselage and the lower wing. The H.31's fuselage was built around four Duralumin tube longerons with triangular cross bracing. Its external oval cross section was produced by longitudinal stringers over formers. The pilot's open cockpit, provided with a small, faired headrest was under the trailing edge of the upper wing. The fuselage tapered only gently to the rear, where a roughly elliptical cantilever tailplane carrying split elevators was mounted on top. The vertical tail was similarly rounded and low, with a rudder that extended down to the keel. The fighter had a fixed conventional undercarriage with mainwheels on a fixed axle, supported by a pair of V-struts attached to the bottom of the lower wing to fuselage struts, and given lateral strength by cross-wire bracing. There was a tailskid.

The H.31 first appeared in public, before its first flight, at the December 1924 Paris Aero Show (Salon de l'Aéronautique). It first flew in 1925. When the twelve competing designs were evaluated by the Section Technique de l'Aéronautique (Technical Section of Aeronautics), the H.31 did not fare well. It was one of the heaviest, and the slowest of all both in level flight and particularly in the climb. The Nieuport-Delage NiD 42 was the competition winner and the H.31 was abandoned.

== Specifications ==
Data from Green & Swanborough p.279

General characteristics

- Crew: One
- Length: 7.58 m (24 ft 10 in)
- Wingspan: 12.00 m (39 ft 4 in)
- Height: 3.62 m (11 ft 11 in)
- Wing area: 34.00 m^{2} (366.0 sq ft)
- Empty weight: 1,287 kg (2,837 lb)
- Gross weight: 1,789 kg (3,944 lb)
- Powerplant: 1 × Salmson 18Cm 18-cylinder 2-row water-cooled in-line radial engine, 370 kW (500 hp)
- Propellers: 2-bladed

Performance

- Maximum speed: 260 km/h (160 mph, 140 kn) at sea level, 207 km/h (129 mph) at 5,000 m (16,405 ft)
- Service ceiling: 8,000 m (26,000 ft)
- Time to altitude: 16.7 min to 5,000 m (16,405 ft)

Armament

- Guns: 4×7.7 mm (0.303 in) synchronised machine guns
