= List of torpedo bombers =

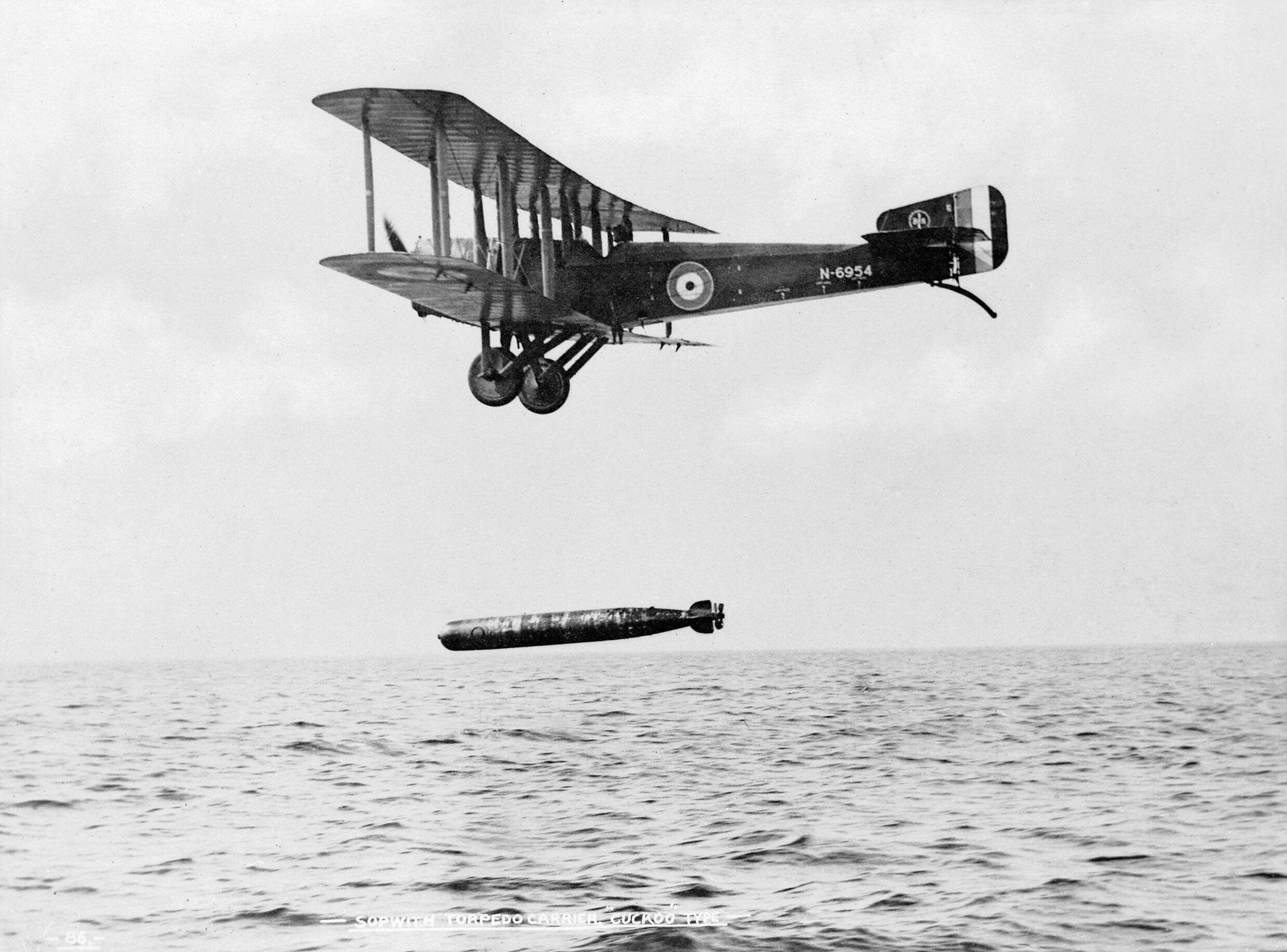
Sopwith Cuckoo dropping torpedo during trials

This is a list of torpedo bomber aircraft, designed or adapted to carry a primary weapon load of one or more aerial torpedoes in an anti-shipping role. It does not include types equipped for the more general anti-submarine warfare (ASW) role.

== Torpedo bombers ==
Type	Country	Class	Date	Status	No.	Notes
AD Seaplane Type 1000	UK		1916	Prototype	2	
Aeromarine 700	US		1917	Prototype	2	
Aichi AB-8	Japan		1933	Prototype	1	
Aichi B7A Grace	Japan		1942	Out of service	114	
Albatros W.3	Germany		1916	Prototype	1	
Albatros W.5	Germany		1916	Out of service	5	
Arado Ar 95	Germany		1936	Out of service	42	
Arado Ar 195	Germany		1937	Out of service	3	
Armstrong Whitworth A.W.19	UK		1934	Prototype	1	
Avro 557 Ava	UK		1924	Prototype	2	
Avro 571 Buffalo	UK		1926	Prototype	1	
Beardmore W.B.VI	UK		N/A	Design only	0	
Blackburn B-3	UK		1932	Prototype	2	
Blackburn B-7	UK		1934	Prototype	1	
Blackburn Baffin	UK		1932	Out of service	97	
Blackburn Beagle	UK		1928	Prototype	1	
Blackburn Blackburd	UK		1918	Prototype	3	
Blackburn Botha	UK		1938	Out of service	580	
Blackburn Cubaroo	UK		1924	Prototype	2	
Blackburn Dart	UK		1921	Out of service	118	
Blackburn Firebrand	UK		1942	Out of service	220	
Blackburn Firecrest	UK		1947	Prototype	3	
Blackburn G.P.	UK		1916	Prototype	2	
Blackburn Kangaroo	UK		1918	Out of service	20	
Blackburn Ripon	UK		1926	Out of service	96	
Blackburn Shark	UK		1933	Out of service	269	
Blackburn Swift	UK		1921	Prototype	1	
Blackburn Velos	UK		1925	Out of service	16	
Bloch MB.175T	France		1939	Out of service	80	
Bloch MB.480	France		1939	Prototype	2	
Blohm & Voss Ha 140	Germany		1937	Prototype	3	
Boeing TB	US		1927	Prototype	3	
Boeing XF8B	US		1944	Prototype	3	Secondary torpedo bomber role.
Borel-Odier Bo-T	France		1916	Out of service		91 ordered, not all built
Brewster SB2A Buccaneer	US		1941	Out of service	771	
Bristol Beaufort	UK		1938	Out of service	2,129	
Bristol Beaufighter	UK		1939	Out of service	5,928	Some variants only.
Bristol Brigand	UK		1944	Out of service	147	
CAC Woomera	Australia		1941	Prototype	2	
CANT Z.506B	Italy		1935	Out of service	324	
CANT Z.1007	Italy		1937	Out of service	660	
Caproni Ca.3	Italy		1916	Out of service	250-300	
Caproni Ca.124	Italy		1937	Prototype	1	
Caproni Ca 314-RA	Italy		1940	Out of service	14	
Caproni Ca.316	Italy		1940	Out of service	14	
Consolidated PBY Catalina	US		1935	Out of service	3,305	
Consolidated PB2Y Coronado	US		1937	Out of service	217	
Consolidated PB4Y-2 Privateer	US		1943	Out of service	739	
Consolidated TBY Sea Wolf	US		1941	Out of service	180	
Curtiss CS/Martin T2M	US		1923	Out of service	83	
Curtiss CT	US		1921	Prototype	1	
Curtiss R-3, R-6 & R-9	US		1915	Out of service	312	
Curtiss XBTC	US		1945	Prototype	2	
Curtiss XBT2C	US		1945	Prototype	9	
De Havilland Mosquito	UK		1940	Out of service	7,781	Number includes all types.
Dewoitine D.750	France		1940	Prototype	1	
Dornier Do D	Germany		1924	Out of service	29	
Dornier Do 22	Germany		1938	Out of service	28	
Dornier Do 217	Germany		1938			Experiments only.
Douglas A-20 Havoc/Boston	US		1939	Out of service	7,478	
Douglas BTD Destroyer	US		1943	Out of service	30	
Douglas BT2D	US		1945	Prototype	1	
Douglas DT	US		1921	Out of service	90	
Douglas T2D	US		1927	Out of service	31	
Douglas XT3D	US		1931	Prototype	1	
Douglas TBD Devastator	US		1935	Out of service	130	
Douglas TB2D Skypirate	US		1945	Prototype	2	
Fairey Albacore	UK		1938	Out of service	800	
Fairey Barracuda	UK		1940	Out of service	2,572	
Fairey G.4/31	UK		1934	Prototype	1	
Fairey Spearfish	UK		1945	Prototype	5	
Fairey Swordfish	UK		1934	Out of service	2,391	
Farman F.165	France		1927	Out of service	40	
Farman F.167	France		1928	Prototype	1	
Farman F.168	France		1928	Out of service	200	
Farman F.268	France		1932	Conversion	1	Converted F.168.
Farman F.270 & 271	France		1933	Prototype	1	
Farman F.368	France		1932	Conversion	1	Converted F.168.
Fiat G.55S torpedo fighter	Italy		1944	Prototype	1	
Fiat RS.14B	Italy		1939	Out of service	188	
Fieseler Fi 167	Germany		1938	Out of service	14	
FMA IA-58 Pucará	Argentina		1969	Prototype	1	Prototype tested during Falklands War.
Focke-Wulf Fw 190 A5/U14	Germany		1943	Prototype	1	
Focke-Wulf Fw 190 A5/U14, F8/U2 and F8/U3	Germany		1944	Prototype	5	
Focke-Wulf Fw 200	Germany			Out of service		
Fokker T.II/FT	Netherlands		1921	Prototype	1	
Fokker T.III	Netherlands		1922	Out of service	5	
Fokker T.IV & IVa	Netherlands		1927	Out of service	42	
Fokker T.VIII-W, -WM, -WC & -L	Netherlands		1938	Out of service	49	
Friedrichshafen FF.35	Germany		1916	Prototype	1	
Friedrichshafen FF.41A	Germany		1917	Out of service	9	
Friedrichshafen FF.53	Germany		1918	Out of service	3	
Gloster Goring	UK		1927	Prototype	1	
Gloster TSR.38	UK		1932	Prototype	1	
Gotha WD.11	Germany		1916	Out of service	12	
Gotha WD.14	Germany		1916	Out of service	69	
Great Lakes XTBG	US		1935	Prototype	1	
Grumman AF Guardian	US		1945	Out of service	389	
Grumman TBF Avenger	US		1941	Out of service	9,839	
Grumman XTB2F	US		N/A	Design only	0	
Grumman XTSF	US		N/A	Design only	0	
Hall XPTBH	US		1937	Prototype	1	
Handley Page H.P.31 Harrow	UK		1926	Prototype	2	
Handley Page H.P.46	UK		1932	Prototype	1	
Handley Page H.P.47	UK		1934	Prototype	1	
Handley Page Hampden	UK		1936	Out of service	1,430	Later role
Handley Page Hanley	UK		1922	Prototype	3	
Handley Page Hare	UK		1928	Prototype	1	
Handley Page Hendon	UK		1924	Out of service	6	
Hansa-Brandenburg GW	Germany		1916	Out of service	c. 20	
Hansa-Brandenburg GDW	Germany		1916	Prototype	1	
Hawker Dantorp	UK		1932	Prototype	2	
Hawker Harrier	UK		1927	Prototype	1	
Hawker Horsley	UK		1925	Out of service	122	
Heinkel HE 7	Germany		1927	Prototype	1	
Heinkel HD 14	Germany		1924	Prototype	1	
Heinkel HD 16	Germany		1928	Out of service	2	
Heinkel He 59	Germany		1931	Out of service	142	
Heinkel He 111 J and H-5/6	Germany		1935	Out of service	6,508	Number includes all types.
Heinkel He 115	Germany		1937	Out of service	138	
Heinkel He 177 A-3/R7	Germany		1939	Out of service	1,169	
Ilyushin DB-3T/Il-4T	USSR		1938	Out of service		
Ilyushin Il-2T	USSR			Out of service		
Ilyushin Il-28T	USSR		1948	Out of service	6,731	Number includes all types.
Junkers G 24/See/G 24g1e	Germany			Experimental	1	
Junkers JuG-1	Germany		1924	Out of service	23	
Junkers Ju 86K T.3	Germany		1936	Out of service	16	Swedish examples only.
Junkers Ju 87 C and D-4	Germany			Prototype		Experimental only.
Junkers Ju 88 A-4/Torp and A/17	Germany			Prototype		
Junkers Ju 188	Germany			Out of service		
Kaiser-Fleetwings XBTK	US		1945	Prototype	5	
Kawanishi H6K Mavis	Japan		1936	Out of service	215	
Kawanishi H8K Emily	Japan		1941	Out of service	167	
KEA L.33 Xelóna	Greece		1938	Out of service	2	
Latécoère 290 series	France		1931	Out of service	35	
Latécoère 298	France		1936	Out of service	121	
Latécoère 299	France		1939	Prototype	2	
Latécoère 302	France		1931	Prototype	3	
Latécoère 440	France		1931	Prototype	2	
Latécoère 550	France		1933	Prototype	1	
Latécoère 582	France		1935	Prototype	1	
Levasseur PL.2	France		1922	Out of service	11	
Levasseur PL.7	France		1928	Out of service	46	
Levasseur PL.14	France		1929	Out of service	30	
Levasseur PL.15	France		1932	Out of service	17	
Levasseur PL.107 & 108	France		1937	Out of service	3	
Lioré et Olivier LeO H-257, 257bis & 258	France		1928	Out of service	87	
Loire-Nieuport 10	France		1939	Prototype	1	
Lockheed Ventura	US		1940	Out of service	2,475	
Lockheed Harpoon	US		1943	Out of service	535	
Lublin R-XX	Poland		1935	Prototype	1	
LWS-5	Poland		N/A	Design only	0	
Martin AM Mauler	US		1944	Out of service	151	
Martin B-26 Marauder	US		1940	Out of service	5,288	Number includes all types.
Martin BM	US		1930	Out of service	32	
Martin MBT/MT	US		1918	Out of service	20	
Martin P4M Mercator	US		1946	Out of service	21	
Martin P5M Marlin	US		1948	Out of service	285	
Martin PBM Mariner	US		1939	Out of service	1,285	
Martin T2M (SC)	US		1923	Out of service	75	
Martin T3M	US		1926	Out of service	124	
Martin T4M	US		1927	Out of service	155	
Martin XT6M	US		1930	Prototype	1	
Messerschmitt Me 410 B-5	Germany		1944	Prototype	1	Experiment only.
Mitsubishi 1MT	Japan		1922	Out of service	20	
Mitsubishi 3MT5	Japan		1932	Prototype	11	
Mitsubishi 3MT10	Japan		1932	Prototype	1	
Mitsubishi B1M	Japan		1923	Out of service	443	
Mitsubishi B2M	Japan		1929	Out of service	206	
Mitsubishi B4M	Japan		1934	Prototype	1	
Mitsubishi B5M Mabel	Japan		1937	Out of service	125	
Mitsubishi G3M Nell	Japan		1935	Out of service	1,048	
Mitsubishi G4M Betty	Japan		1939	Out of service	2,435	
Mitsubishi Ki-67 Peggy	Japan		1942	Out of service	767	
Nakajima B3N	Japan		1933	Prototype	2	
Nakajima B4N	Japan		1936	Prototype	2	
Nakajima B5N Kate	Japan		1937	Out of service	c. 1,150	
Nakajima B6N Jill	Japan		1941	Out of service	1,268	
North American B-25 Mitchell	US		1940		9,984	Some variants only.
Northrop N-3PB	US		1940	Out of service	24	
Parnall G.4/31	UK		1934	Prototype	1	
Piaggio P.108	Italy		1939	Out of service	24	Secondary role
PZL 18	Poland		N/A	Design only	0	
Reggiane Re.2001G/H torpedo fighter	Italy	Variant	1940	Out of service	2	
Reggiane Re.2002 torpedo fighter	Italy		1940	Prototype	1	For trials.
RWD 22	Poland		N/A	Design only	0	
SAAB T 18B	Sweden		1942	Out of service	52	Torpedo bomber used for ground attack.
Savoia-Marchetti S.55	Italy		1924	Out of service	212	
Savoia-Marchetti SM.79 Sparviero	Italy		1934	Out of service	1,350	
Savoia-Marchetti SM.81	Italy		1934	Out of service	535	For trials.
Savoia-Marchetti SM.84	Italy		1940	Out of service	309	
Savoia-Marchetti SM.93	Italy		1944	Prototype	1	
Short Shirl	UK		1918	Prototype	4	
Short Sturgeon S.1 & S.B.3	UK		1946	Prototype	4	
Short Type 81	UK		1913	Out of service	9	
Short Type 166	UK		1916	Out of service	26	
Short Type 184	UK		1915	Out of service	936	First torpedo bomber to sink a ship.
Short Type 310/320	UK		1916	Out of service	127	
SNCAC NC.4-10	France		1939	Prototype	1	
SNCAC NC.1070	France		1947	Prototype	1	
SNCAO CAO.600	France		1940	Prototype	1	
Sopwith Cuckoo	UK		1917	Out of service	232	First purpose-built carrier-based torpedo bomber.
Sopwith Special torpedo seaplane Type C	UK		1914	Prototype	1	
Sopwith Type 860	UK		1914	Out of service	22	
Stout ST	US		1922	Prototype	3	
Supermarine Nanok	UK		1927	Prototype	1	
Supermarine Type 322	UK		1943	Prototype	2	
Tupolev ANT-7 (MR-6)	USSR		1930	Out of service	411	Number includes all variants.
Tupolev ANT-22	USSR		1934	Prototype	1	
Tupolev ANT-41 (T-1)	USSR		1936	Prototype	1	
KR-6T	USSR			Prototype	1	
Tupolev TB-1	USSR		1925	Out of service	218	
Tupolev Tu-2T (ANT-62T)	USSR			Out of service		
Tupolev Tu-14	USSR		1949	Out of service	89	
Tupolev Tu-91	USSR		1955	Prototype	1	
Vickers Type 207	UK		1933	Prototype	1	
Vickers Type 253	UK		1934	Prototype	1	
Vickers Vildebeest	UK		1928	Out of service	209	
Vickers Vimy	UK		1918	Out of service	1	Trials.
Vickers Wellesley	UK		1935	Out of service	177	Role dropped following drop tests.
Vickers Wellington	UK		1936	Out of service	11,461	Number includes all types.
Westland PV-3	UK		1931	Prototype	1	Role dropped.
Westland PV.7	UK		1933	Prototype	1	
Westland Witch	UK		1928	Prototype	1	
Westland Wyvern	UK		1946	Out of service	127	
Wight Twin	UK		1915	Out of service	4	
Yokosuka experimental twin-engined seaplane	Japan		1916	Experimental	1	
Yokosuka B3Y	Japan		1933	Out of service	129	
Yokosuka B4Y Jean	Japan		1935	Out of service	205	
Yokosuka P1Y Frances	Japan		1943	Out of service	1,102	

== See also ==
- List of bomber aircraft
- List of maritime patrol aircraft
