= Type C =

Type C or Type-C may refer to:

== Science and technology ==
- Europlug, a type C power plug
- Niemann–Pick disease, type C
- Type C videotape
- USB-C
- Chromogenic color print, a photographic print sometimes called a "Type-C print" or "C-print"

== Vehicles ==
- Citroën Type C
- Díaz Type C
- Sopwith Admiralty Type C
- Sopwith Special torpedo seaplane Type C
- Type C escort ship
- Type C submarine
- Vickers Type C
- C type Adelaide tram
