= Curtiss CT =

1921 American torpedo bomber aircraft

Curtiss CT-1
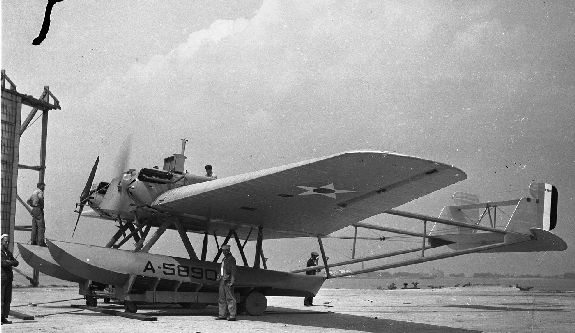
- The CT-1 at the Anacostia Navy Yard

General information
- Type: Torpedo Bomber
- National origin: United States
- Manufacturer: Curtiss Aeroplane and Motor Company
- Designer: Wilbur Gilmore
- Number built: 1

History
- First flight: 9 May 1921

The Curtiss CT-1 (or Curtiss Model 24), a twin engine torpedo bomber mounted on floats, was first flown in 1921.

== Development ==
The US Navy was looking for a new torpedo bomber following a demonstration of sinking a battleship with an aircraft. A specification was announced requiring a twin floatplane that could be sled launched and crane recovered at sea. The aircraft had a maximum span of 65 feet (20 m) which could be broken down into 25 feet (7.6 m) sections for shipboard storage. Prototypes of the Curtiss CT-1, Stout ST-1, Fokker FT-1 and Blackburn Swift F were evaluated at the Anacostia Naval Yard. Curtiss won an initial contract to build nine torpedo bombers on June 30, 1920, but the order was canceled and only one acceptance prototype was built. The aircraft was constructed in Rockaway, New York.

== Design ==
The aircraft had twin booms, twin tails, twin floats and a single cockpit. A turret was placed high above and behind the pilot to have a full 360 degree firing arc. The thick airfoil wings were cantilevered without struts or wires using three spars. The fuselage was made of traditional welded tube frame with the-then new technology of an aluminum skin. The rest of the aircraft was of welded tube with a fabric covering. The engine nacelles were deeply recessed into the wings. Two under-wing Lamblin radiators provided cooling. Engine stands were located for mechanics to work on the aircraft. Single-engine operation resulted in a height loss of 100 ft per minute.

== Operational history ==
The first water taxi tests were performed by Bert Acosta on 2 May 1921 at NAS Rockaway, resulting in larger rudders added for stability. The sheet metal formed motor mounts and tail structure required reinforcement. The engines overheated, and could only fly for 20 minutes at a time.

The aircraft was demonstrated to the US Navy at the Annacostia Naval Yard and at the war college at Fort McNair, Washington, D.C. The aircraft was given the serial number A-5890, and the navy designation CT-1, for "Curtiss" "Torpedo bomber (number one)"-"variant one".

== Specifications Curtiss CT-1 ==
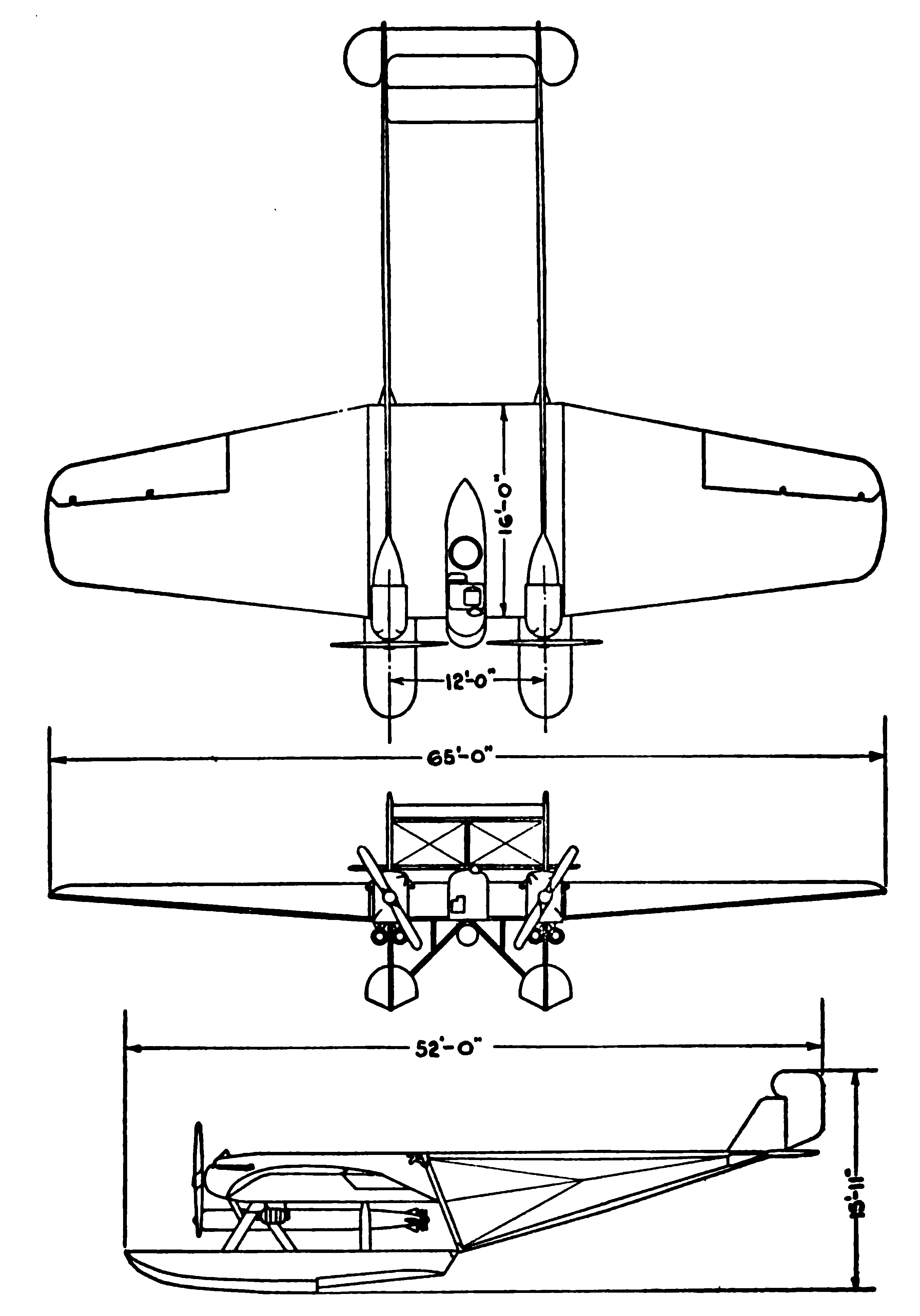
Curtiss CT 3-view drawing

Data from Curtiss Aircraft 1907–1947

General characteristics

- Crew: 3
- Length: 46 ft 0 in (14.02 m)
- Wingspan: 65 ft 0 in (19.81 m)
- Height: 14 ft 6 in (4.42 m)
- Wing area: 830 sq ft (77 m^{2})
- Airfoil: Curtiss C-32
- Empty weight: 7,684 lb (3,485 kg)
- Gross weight: 11,208 lb (5,084 kg)
- Powerplant: 2 × Curtiss D-12 water-cooled V12 engines, 435 hp (324 kW) each
- Propellers: 2-bladed

Performance

- Maximum speed: 93 kn (107 mph, 172 km/h)
- Range: 300 nmi (350 mi, 560 km)
- Service ceiling: 5,200 ft (1,600 m)
- Time to altitude: 10 min to 2,600 ft (790 m)

Armament

- Guns: 1 or 2 Lewis guns

== See also ==
Aircraft of comparable role, configuration, and era

- Douglas DT
- Fokker T.II
- Fokker T.III
- Naval Aircraft Factory PT

Related lists

- List of flying boats and floatplanes
- List of torpedo bombers
