= Albatros W.3 =

W.3
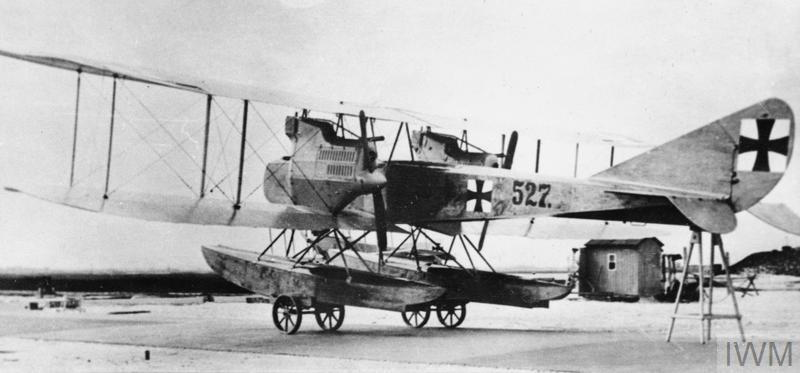
- Rear oblique photo of an Albatros W.III torpedo bomber with axles beneath its floats

General information
- Type: Float plane torpedo bomber
- National origin: Germany
- Manufacturer: Albatros Flugzeugwerke
- Number built: 1

History
- First flight: Before July 1916
- Developed into: Albatros W.5

The Albatros W.3, company designation VT, was a biplane torpedo bomber floatplane prototype, built for the Imperial German Navy during the First World War. Only one was built.

== Design and development ==
The W.3 was designed from the outset as a torpedo bomber, a large two-bay biplane powered by two 150 hp (112 kW) Benz Bz.III engines in pusher configuration mounted on top of the lower wing; these drove two-bladed propellers, The wings had straight leading edges, squared tips and almost constant chord, though the upper trailing edge was complicated by cut-outs for the propellers and by ailerons, fitted only to this wing, which increased in chord outwards. There was no stagger, so each pair of interplane struts was perpendicular to the wing; the forward member of each pair was at the leading edge and the other at mid-chord.

The fuselage was flat sided, with two open, tandem cockpits in the nose ahead of the leading edge and deepest between nose and trailing edge, forming a belly which housed the torpedo. Aft, it became quite slender, with a broad chord, triangular fin and rounded, balanced rudder. Twin floats, only about half as long as the fuselage, were mounted on individual sets of struts to allow torpedo release between them.

One Albatros W.3 was built and supplied to the Imperial German Navy in July 1916. The design was developed into the W.5, five of which were built for the Navy in 1917.

== Specifications ==
Data from German Aircraft of World War I

General characteristics

- Crew: Two
- Length: 13.1 m (43 ft 0 in)
- Wingspan: 22.7 m (74 ft 6 in)
- Powerplant: 2 × Benz Bz.III 6-cylinder water-cooled inline in pusher configuration, 110 kW (150 hp) each
- Propellers: 2-bladed

Performance

- Maximum speed: 133 km/h (83 mph, 72 kn)

Armament

- Guns: 2 × 7.92 mm (0.312 in) machine guns
- Bombs: 1 × Torpedo

== Bibliography ==
- Gray, Peter & Thetford, Owen (1987) [1970]. German Aircraft of the First World War (2nd ed.). Putnam. ISBN 0-85177-809-7.
- Herris, Jack (2017). Albatros Aircraft of WWI: A Centennial Perspective on Great War Airplanes: Volume 3: Bombers, Seaplanes, J-Types. Great War Aviation Centennial Series. Vol. 26. Charleston, South Carolina: Aeronaut Books. ISBN 978-1-935881-49-0.
- Nowarra, Heinz J (May 1980). "Les Premiers Torpilleurs Allemande" [The First German Torpedo Aircraft]. Le Fanatique de l'Aviation (in French) (126): 52–58.
- Schmeelke, Michael (2020). "Torpedo Los!": The German Imperial Torpedo-Flieger. n.p.: Aeronaut Books. ISBN 978-1-953201-17-1.
