= C-type =

C-type may refer to:

- Type C (disambiguation), q.v.
- C data types
- C-type asteroid
- Carbon star (C-type star)
- C-type lectin
- C-type (New York City Subway car)
- Jaguar C-Type (1951 racing car)
