= Fokker T.III =

Single engine floatplane designed in the Netherlands in the early 1920s

T.III
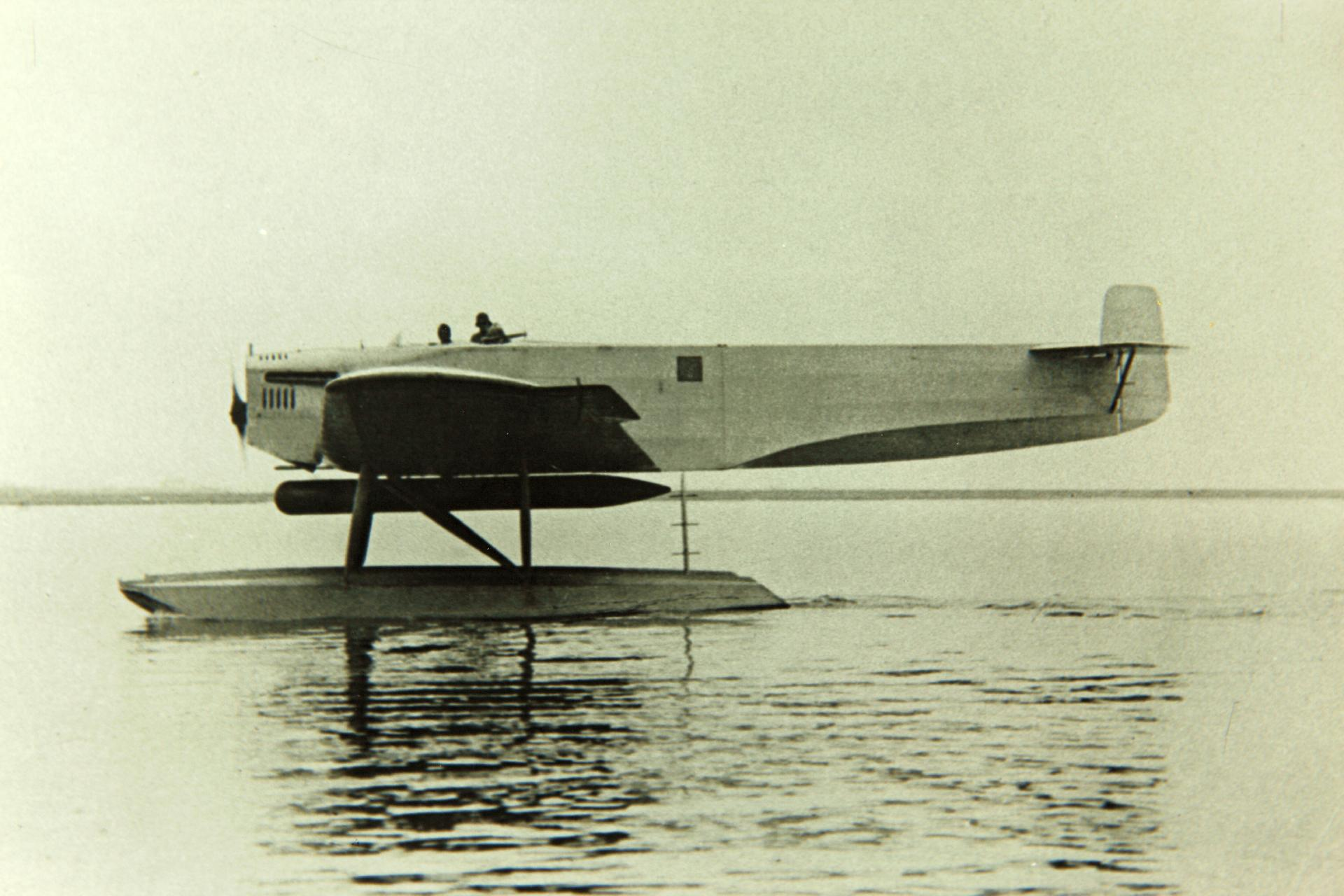

General information
- Type: Torpedo bomber and bomber
- National origin: Netherlands
- Manufacturer: Fokker-Flugzeugwerke
- Primary user: Aviação Naval Portuguesa
- Number built: 5

History
- First flight: Summer 1923

The Fokker T.III or T.3 was a single engine floatplane designed in the Netherlands in the early 1920s as a bomber or torpedo bomber.

== Design and development ==
Fokker's second torpedo bomber was an enlarged development on the T.II from two years before. With a slightly greater span and 30% heavier, it had cockpits for three rather than two, and a larger more powerful W-12 engine in place of the T.IIs V-12. Its floats could be exchanged for a wheeled undercarriage. It first flew in the summer of 1923.

The T.III was a cantilever low wing monoplane with thick section, straight tapered, square tipped wings. Angular overhung ailerons were used. Its fuselage was flat topped and sided and deep from tail to nose. The three crew sat in tandem, separate, open oval cockpits, with the forward two close together over the wing and fitted with dual control. The third cockpit was spaced further away behind the trailing edge and fitted with two machine guns, one on a conventional mounting firing upwards and the other firing downwards through the fuselage underside. The rear cockpit also held the two release levers for 50 kg (110 lb) and for 100 kg (220 lb) bombs. The braced tailplane was mounted on top of the fuselage and carried horn-balanced elevators. In plan the tail was straight tapered and square tipped, with a large cut-out for rudder movement. There were several variations of the vertical tail though in all the rudder was straight edged and balanced. Some had no fin, with the rudder finishing at the keel and with a nick above the fuselage, another similar but with a rudder extension to below the keel and another still with a very short fin and small dorsal fillet but no fin extension.

Several different engines were fitted. A standard engine was a 450 hp (300 kW) Napier Lion water-cooled W-12. An alternative was the 360 hp (270 kW) Rolls-Royce Eagle IX water-cooled V-12 engine. Both drove a four blade propeller. The two engines had similar metal cowlings, differing externally only in the number and position of the exhaust pipes (3×4 on the Lion, 2×6 on the Eagle) and the lower output shaft of the Eagle.

The T.III's alternative undercarriages were both fixed, with the two legs independent of each, avoiding the cross bracing which would have interfered with the bomb or torpedo release. Each mainwheel was on a horizontal axle supported at the outer end by a longitudinal V-strut from the wing underside. There were two more pairs of Vs, one fixed below the wing and the other on the lower fuselage, angled towards each other to support the inner end of the axle. A tailskid completed the undercarriage. The T.III's twin float undercarriage projected just forward of the nose. The floats were mounted on the fuselage by two sets of N-struts, with diagonal transverse bracing between them, on each float. Both wood and aluminium floats were available. Fitting floats added 243 kg (536 lb) to the unladened weight and reduced the maximum speed by 11 km/h (7 mph).

== Operational history ==
Early in 1924 the Portuguese Naval Aviation (Aviação Naval Portuguesa) ordered five T.IIIs to replace their ageing Tellier T.3 flying boats. The first Fokker flew to Portugal at the end of August, though with a stop at Bordeaux after about nine hours flying to rectify fuel problems. It had a wheeled undercarriage and an Eagle engine. Another F.III was crated out but when the remaining three left Schellingwoude one of them, with its crew of two, was lost in fog over the sea near Brest, France.

The Portuguese had originally seen the Fokkers as vehicles for worldwide flight but these did not proceed. The remaining T.IIIs served the Portuguese Navy as reconnaissance aircraft until 1928, when they were replaced by CAMS 37A amphibians.

== Variants ==
T.III
Landplane bomber.
T.IIIW
Floatplane torpedo bomber. Wheels and floats were interchangeable.

== Operators ==
Portugal

- Aviação Naval Portuguesa

== Specifications (Lion engine, landplane) ==
Data from Hegener

General characteristics

- Crew: Three
- Length: 14.08 m (46 ft 2 in)
- Wingspan: 21.20 m (69 ft 7 in)
- Height: 3.39 m (11 ft 1 in)
- Empty weight: 2,331 kg (5,140 lb)
- Gross weight: 3,319 kg (7,317 lb)
- Max takeoff weight: 4,339 kg (9,565 lb)
- Powerplant: 1 × Napier Lion water-cooled W-12, 340 kW (450 hp)
- Propellers: 4-bladed

Performance

- Maximum speed: 169 km/h (105 mph, 91 kn)

Armament

- Two machine guns in rear cockpit.
- At least 3×100 kg (220 lb) and 1×50 kg (110 lb) bombs together.
