= Sopwith Admiralty Type C =

Admiralty Type C

General information
- Type: Torpedo bomber
- National origin: United Kingdom
- Manufacturer: Sopwith Aviation
- Primary user: Royal Navy Air Service
- Number built: 3

History
- Introduction date: November 1914
- First flight: 1914
- Retired: 1916

The Sopwith Admiralty Type C was an early British floatplane designed and built by Sopwith Aviation to drop torpedoes. A single engined tractor biplane floatplane, three were delivered to the Royal Navy in November 1914 but proved unable to lift a torpedo.

== Design and development ==
The Admiralty had ordered a special torpedo carrying biplane (the Sopwith Special torpedo seaplane Type C, serial number 170) in February 1914 and followed it with an order in July 1914 for three similar Type C floatplanes (serial numbers 157, 158 and 159). The specification called for folding wings, bomb gear, a gun and radio. Work started at the Sopwith factory at Kingston-upon-Thames on 5 April 1914 and the three Type Cs, powered by a 200 hp (150 kW) Salmson (Canton-Uneé) piston engine, were completed by October. They went to RNAS Calshot for evaluation in November 1914. The Special, tested that July, had failed to lift a torpedo and the new Type Cs were little better, failing to take off under load: 157 could not get airborne with a 14 in (360 mm) Whitehead torpedo and the other two had similar poor performance. 158 was accepted by the service on 4 February 1915 but it sank following a forced landing a few days later on 8 February. The two survivors, 157 and 159, were withdrawn from service at the end of 1915.

== Operators ==
United Kingdom

- Royal Naval Air Service

== See also ==
Related lists

- List of flying boats and floatplanes
