= Farman F.160 =

F.160 Goliath
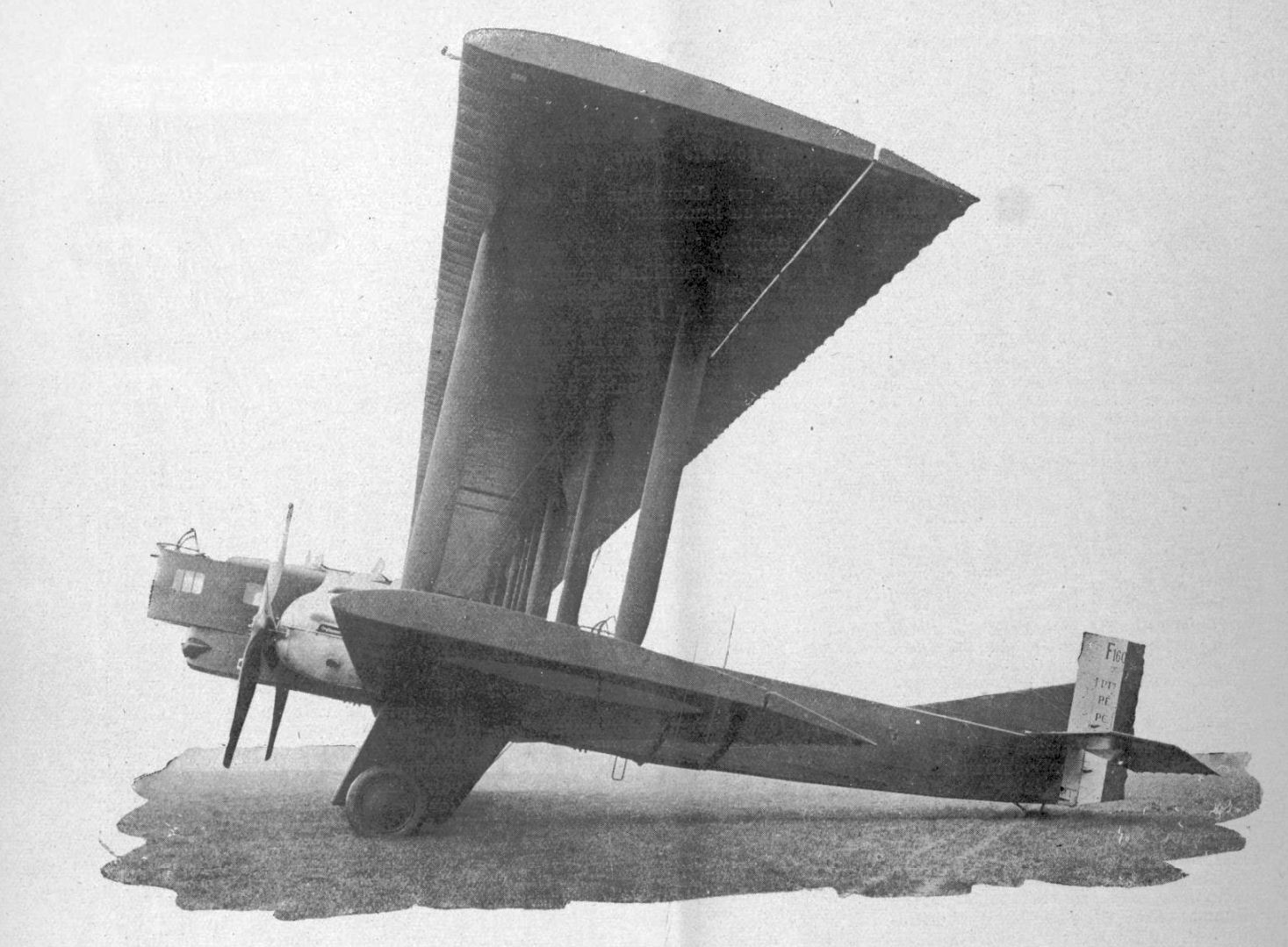
- Farman F.160

General information
- Type: Bomber
- Manufacturer: Farman
- Primary user: Aéronautique Maritime
- Number built: c. 250

History
- First flight: 1928

The Farman F.160 was a heavy bomber aircraft developed in France in the late 1920s. It was essentially an attempt by Farman Aviation Works to modernise its tremendously successful F.60 Goliath design of the immediately postwar years. The most noticeable external difference was the larger tailfin of the new aircraft. Like its predecessor, it was a large three-bay biplane of conventional configuration with unstaggered wings of equal span. Initially conceived as a heavy night bomber, most examples built were float-equipped torpedo bombers for the Aéronautique Maritime, which operated some 40 of the F.165 variant and 200 of the F.168. One of the original F.160 night bombers was exported to Italy, and one to Japan. Plans to develop airliner versions did not progress past the prototype stage.

== Variants ==
F.160
Four-seat night bomber with two 370 kW (500 hp) Farman 12We engines, designated F.160 BN.4 by Aviation Militaire.
F.161
One airliner with 2x 360 kW (480 hp) Gnome-Rhône 9Akx engines and one bomber similar to the F.160, powered by 2x 370 kW (500 hp) Farman 12Wers engines.
F.162
One prototype airliner with 2x 360 kW (480 hp) Gnome-Rhône 9Akx engines.
F.163
Airliner with 2x 280 kW (380 hp) Gnome-Rhône 9Aa engines.
F.165
Seaplane torpedo bomber with 2x Gnome-Rhône 9A or 9Aa engines.
F.166
2x 170 kW (230 hp) Salmson 9Ab engines.
F.167
Seaplane torpedo bomber with 2x 310 kW (420 hp) Gnome-Rhône 9Aa engines.
F.168
Seaplane torpedo bomber with Gnome-Rhône 9Akx engines; main production version, 200 built.
F.169
Improved airliner version with Gnome-Rhône 9Akx engines.
F.268
One F.168 fitted with 2x supercharged 370 kW (500 hp) Salmson 18 Abs engines.
F.269
One F.169 fitted with floats and modified wings as a sesquiplane seaplane.
F.368
One F.168 re-engined with 2x 400 kW (530 hp) Gnome-Rhône 9Kbrs engines.

== Operators ==
France

- French Navy

Italy

- one aircraft only.

Japan

- One aircraft only.

Romania

- Royal Romanian Air Force

== Specifications (F.168) ==
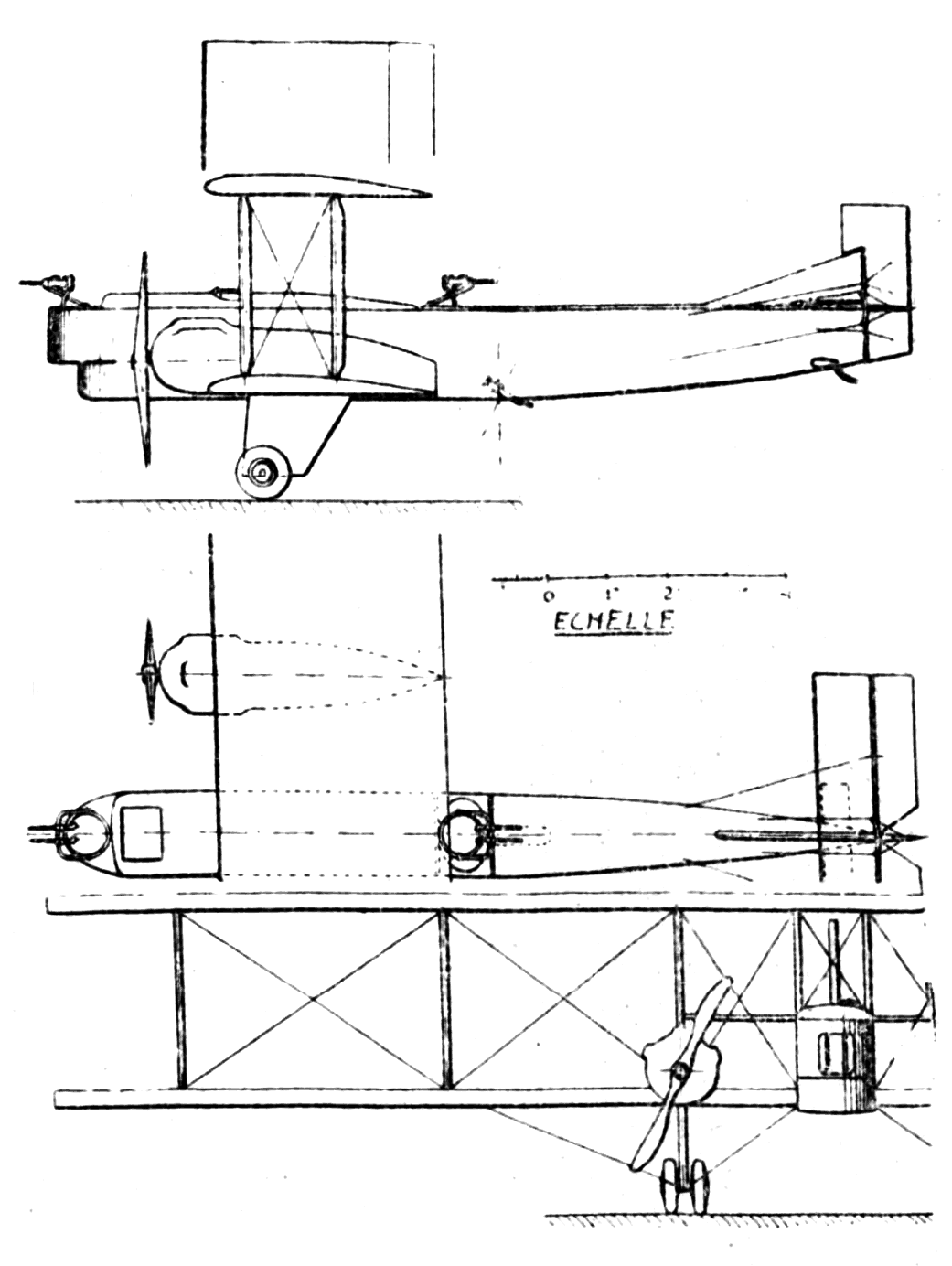
Farman F.160 3-view drawing from L'Aérophile-Salon1926

General characteristics

- Crew: Five
- Length: 15.18 m (49 ft 10 in)
- Wingspan: 26.25 m (86 ft 2 in)
- Height: 6.10 m (20 ft 0 in)
- Wing area: 159.6 m^{2} (11,718 sq ft)
- Empty weight: 4,600 kg (10,140 lb)
- Gross weight: 6,800 kg (14,990 lb)
- Powerplant: 2 × Gnome-Rhône 9Akx , 360 kW (480 hp) each

Performance

- Maximum speed: 174 km/h (108 mph, 94 kn)
- Range: 800 km (500 mi, 430 nmi)
- Service ceiling: 5,000 m (16,400 ft)
- Rate of climb: 2.1 m/s (410 ft/min)

Related lists

- List of Interwar military aircraft
