= Fokker T.II =

Single engine floatplane

T.II
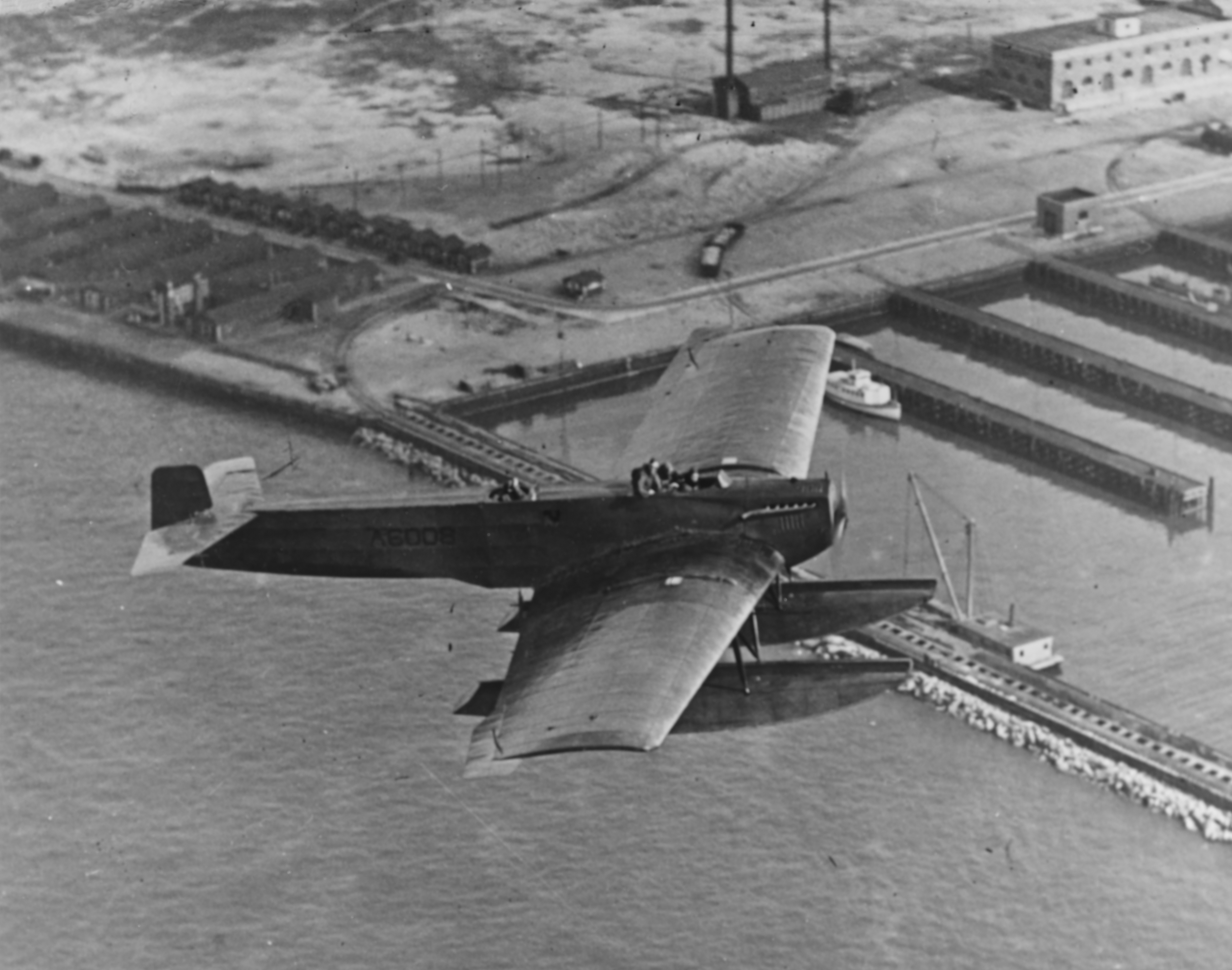

General information
- Type: Torpedo bomber
- National origin: Netherlands
- Manufacturer: Fokker-Flugzeugwerke
- Primary user: US Navy
- Number built: 3

History
- Introduction date: 1922
- First flight: 1921
- Retired: ca. 1926

The Fokker T.II or T.2 (Not to be confused with the Fokker T-2) was a single engine floatplane designed in the Netherlands in the early 1920s as a torpedo bomber. Three were bought by the US Navy who tested them against other aircraft from the US and the UK. The T.IIs did not win further production orders but remained in service for several years.

== Design and development ==
Fokker's T-designation included both bombers and torpedo bombers; the T.II was the first of this series, as the T.I was an unbuilt project. Three were ordered by the US Navy early in 1921 and completed towards the end of that year. Air power enthusiast General Billy Mitchell visited the Fokker works at Veere in early 1922. General Clayton Bissell, traveling with him, was encouraged by Fokker to fly the T.II. He reported it unresponsive to the controls; Fokker responded by having about a meter of the rear fuselage cut out and the structure re-welded, which cured the problem. The three T.IIs were delivered to the US later in 1922, where they were given the designation FT-1 (Fokker torpedo).

The T.II was a cantilever low wing monoplane with straight tapered, square tipped wings. Overhung ailerons were used. The fuselage was flat topped and sided and deep from tail to nose, where a 400 hp (300 kW) Liberty 12A water-cooled V-12 engine drove a two blade propeller. The two crew sat in tandem, separate, open round cockpits over the wing. The tailplane was mounted on top of the fuselage; together, it and the elevators were, like the wings, straight tapered in plan and square tipped. The fin and rudder were quite short but the latter extended to the deep keel. The T.II's twin float undercarriage was about 70% of the aircraft's length, projecting well forward of the nose. The floats were mounted on the fuselage by N-struts, two pairs, with diagonal transverse bracing between them, on each float. There were no transverse interfloat struts, as required by the torpedo dropping role.

The T.II's defensive armament was a single machine gun in the rear cockpit. Its offensive torpedo was mounted externally on the fuselage between the floats.

== Operational history ==
The US Navy conducted comparative tests of several types at their Anacostia base. The competitors in addition to the Fokker were the US Curtiss CT-1, Douglas DT-1, Stout ST-1 and the UK Blackburn Swift F. The Douglas machine won the production order and the Fokkers went into service at the Naval Air Station, Hampton Roads, remaining there until about 1926.

== Variants ==
T.II
Company designation of the torpedo bomber evaluated by the US Navy as the Fokker FT
FT-1
The US Navy's designation for the T.II as delivered.
FT-2
The third aircraft modified by the US Navy.

== Operators ==
USA

- US Navy

== Specifications ==
Data from Wesselink 1982

General characteristics

- Crew: Two
- Length: 15.56 m (51 ft 1 in)
- Wingspan: 19.83 m (65 ft 1 in)
- Gross weight: 3,314 kg (7,306 lb)
- Powerplant: 1 × Liberty 12A water-cooled V-12 engine, 300 kW (400 hp)
- Propellers: 2-bladed

Performance

- Maximum speed: 167 km/h (104 mph, 90 kn)

Armament

- Machine gun in rear cockpit
- Torpedo
