= Vickers Type C =

WWII British bomber

The Vickers Type C was a proposed World War II RAF British bomber. The first proposal for the aircraft (from late 1942) had vertical stabilizers on the tips of the wings, but these were rejected because the design actually caused the plane to become unstable. The second proposal for the plane (from early 1943) had one fin.

The aircraft never entered production.

== Specifications ==
- Length: 95 ft (29 m)
- Wingspan: 210 ft (64 m)
- Height: 11 ft (3.4 m)
- Wing area: 2,900 sq ft (270 m^{2})
- Gross weight: 178,000 lb (80,739 kg)
- Engines: 6 × Bristol Centaurus
- Maximum speed: 382 mph (615 km/h)
- Maximum height: 25,000 ft (7,620 m)
- Guns: 5× 20 mm cannons, 2x 0.5 in machine guns
- Bombs: One 56,000 lb (25,401 kg) bomb
