= Short Admiralty Type 81 =

Series of British two-seat floatplanes

Type 81
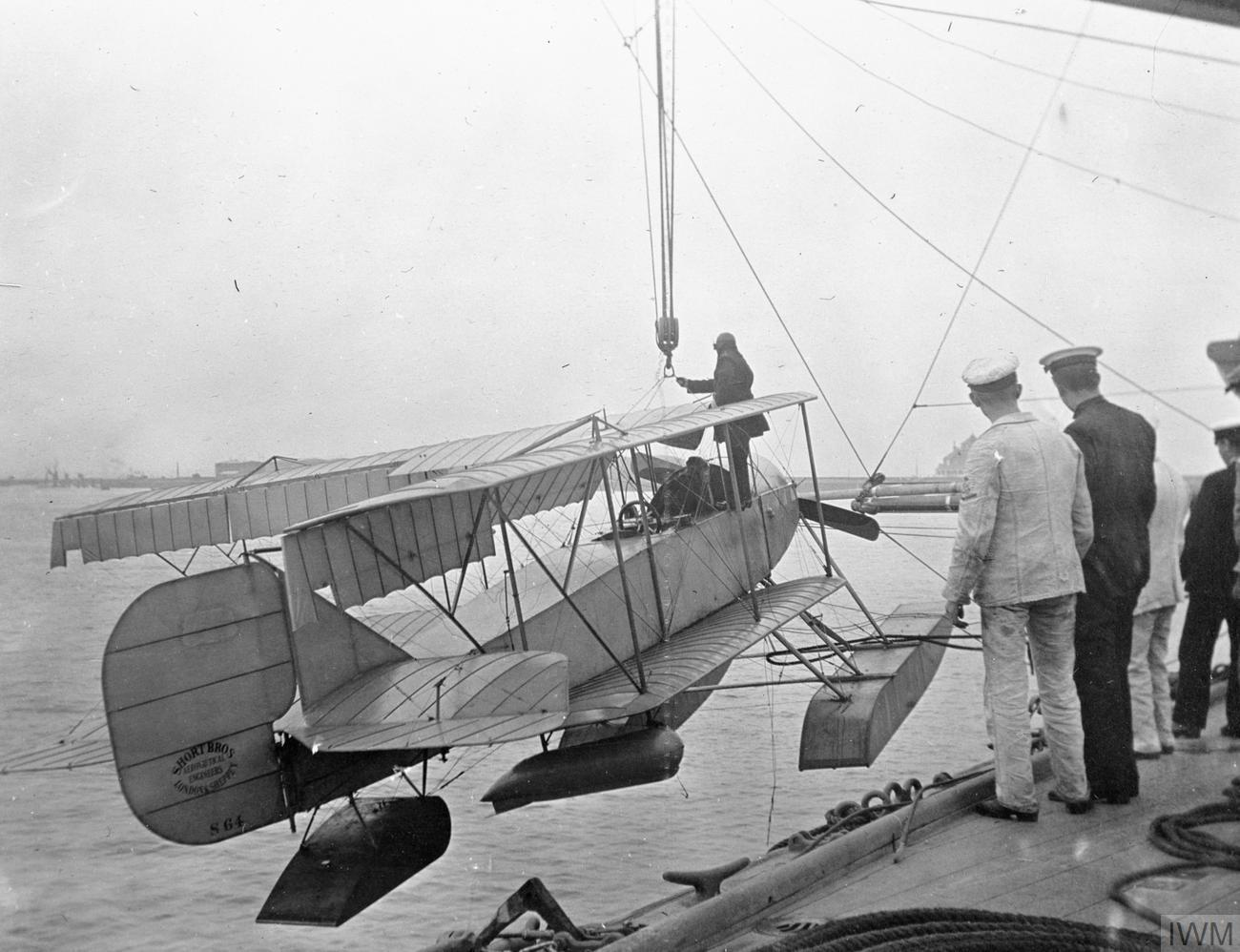
- Short Folder 81 being hoisted aboard the cruiser HMS Hermes

General information
- Type: Floatplane
- National origin: United Kingdom
- Manufacturer: Short Brothers
- Primary user: Royal Naval Air Service
- Number built: 9

History
- Introduction date: 1913
- First flight: July 1913

The Short Admiralty Type 81 was a series of British two-seat floatplanes built prior to the First World War, and used by the Royal Naval Air Service in the early years of the war. They were powered by 160 hp (120 kW) Gnome Lambda-Lambda 14 cylinder two-row rotary engines and had folding wings to aid storage on ship, hence the popular name Short Folder, shared with a number of other seaplanes made by Short Brothers.

== Design and development ==
During 1913, Short Brothers received orders for two new types of floatplanes for the British Royal Naval Air Service (RNAS), a two-bay biplane powered by a 160 hp (120 kW) Gnome Lambda-Lambda twin-row rotary engine, of which two were ordered, and a lighter and less powerful three-bay biplane powered by a 100 hp (75 kW) Gnome Omega-Omega, (the Short Admiralty Type 74) of which seven were ordered.

The first of these to appear was the 160 hp Gnome-powered aircraft, the first of which had the Shorts construction number S.63 and the Royal Navy serial number 81, making its maiden flight in July 1913, piloted by Charles Rumney Samson. It had high aspect ratio wings of uneven span, which were fitted with large ailerons on the upper wings, and folded for storage on board ship. The second 160 hp Folder, serial number 82, followed in March 1914, and was followed by two more (89 and 90 with three-bay wings and an improved wing-folding mechanism as tested by the Short S.41. A further five Folders (119–122, 186), powered by 160 hp Gnomes were delivered in 1914, with longer fuselages and larger three-bay wings of 67-foot (20.4 m) span compared with 56 feet (17.1 m) for the first aircraft). The twin-row Gnomes proved to be unreliable, and were fitted with a large funnel-type exhaust stack above the cowling.

== Operational history ==
The RNAS took delivery of 81 on 17 July 1913, and it was quickly deployed aboard the cruiser HMS Hermes, which had been converted to the first seaplane tender of the Royal Navy, for the 1913 Naval manoeuvres, where it was used for reconnaissance missions, using a radio set to report the position of shipping. An engine failure on 1 August resulted in 81 ditching about 50 miles from Great Yarmouth, but although damaged, it was rescued by the German timber carrier Clara Mennig. The second aircraft 82 took place in the unsuccessful search for the missing submarine HMS A7, while four 160 hp Folders took part in the Spithead Fleet Review in July 1914.

The RNAS took delivery of the Sopwith Special floatplane which was specifically designed to drop a 14-inch torpedo in early July 1914, but it proved unable to take off while carrying the planned weapon (or initially at all), so Squadron-Commander Arthur Longmore, commander of the Calshot seaplane station which was carrying out the torpedo trials, suggested that one of the 160 hp Folders be modified for torpedo dropping. Drawings for torpedo gear were quickly produced by Shorts, and aircraft No. 121, flown by Longmore, carried out the first torpedo drop by a British aircraft on 28 July 1914. (Note: The first torpedo drop from an aircraft in the world was by the Italian Captain Guidoni from a Farman in 1911.) (Note: Some sources suggest that the first torpedo drop was made the previous evening by Shorts test pilot Gordon Bell, although aviation historian J.M Bruce has argued that Longmore did make the first British drop.) Although several other 160 hp Folders were fitted with torpedo gear, the modification was of little practical use, as when carrying a torpedo, it could not carry an observer, and even with only 30 minutes fuel, was badly overloaded.

Following the outbreak of the First World War in August 1914, the Royal Navy purchased three fast cross-channel ferrys for use as seaplane carriers, one of which was HMS Engadine, to which three 160 hp folders were allocated. When Engadine took part in the Cuxhaven Raid on Christmas Day 1914, two of her Folders took off as part of the strike force, one returning to Engadine, and the other ditching near the Royal Navy submarine E11, which recovered its crew.

Three 160 hp folders were sent to Durban in March 1915 to take part in operations against the German cruiser Königsberg, blockaded in the Ruji Delta in German East Africa. The Shorts struggled in the hot and humid conditions of East Africa, being unable to carry any bombload, but were used to carry out reconnaissance of the Königsberg before being replaced in June that year by a Caudron G.III and two Farman F.27s.

== Specifications (RNAS 119–122, 186) ==
Data from Shorts Aircraft since 1900

General characteristics

- Crew: two
- Length: 42 ft 0 in (12.80 m)
- Wingspan: 67 ft 0 in (20.42 m)
- Wing area: 690 sq ft (64 m^{2})
- Empty weight: 3,050 lb (1,383 kg)
- Gross weight: 7,716 lb (3,500 kg)
- Powerplant: 1 × Gnome 14 Double Lambda 2-row 14-cylinder rotary engine, 160 hp (120 kW)

Performance

- Maximum speed: 78 mph (126 km/h, 68 kn)
- Endurance: 5 h
- Time to altitude: 3,000 ft (915 m) in 5 min 30 s

Armament

- Bombs: 4× 112 lb (50 kg) bombs or 1× 810 lb (370 kg) torpedo
