= Sopwith Special torpedo seaplane Type C =

Special torpedo seaplane Type C

General information
- Type: Floatplane torpedo bomber
- National origin: United Kingdom
- Manufacturer: Sopwith Aviation, Kingston upon Thames
- Primary user: Royal Navy Air Service
- Number built: 1

History
- First flight: 19 July 1914
- Retired: January 1915

The Sopwith Special torpedo seaplane Type C was the first British aircraft designed to drop torpedoes. A single-engine biplane floatplane, it flew in July 1914 but proved unable to lift the design load and was soon abandoned.

== Design and development ==
The Admiralty's interest in torpedo delivery by aircraft began in November 1913, expressed by an order placed with Sopwith for a "mock-up" seaplane torpedo carrier, the Sopwith Type TT. This was intended only to taxi, not fly; its trials extended over the following May and June. In February 1914, before trials of the Type TT had begun, this contract was extended to include a second, flying, experimental torpedo carrying seaplane. The resulting Special torpedo seaplane Type C was delivered to RNAS Calshot on 1 July 1914, carrying the RNAS serial number 170.

The Special was a four-bay biplane, with square-tipped, constant-chord, unequal-span wings connected by pairs of parallel interplane struts. The 4 ft (1.2 m) overhangs of the upper wings were braced with an extra pair of interplane struts, leaning outwards and attached to the lower wing at the same points as the outer vertical interplane struts. There were externally interconnected ailerons on both upper and lower wings. The lower wings were attached to the bottom fuselage and the upper ones supported well above the top of the fuselage.

The fuselage was a flat-sided girder structure; the crew occupied tandem cockpits, with the pilot at the rear. The 200 hp (150 kW) Salmson 2M7 water-cooled radial engine was placed just in front of the forward cockpit, close to the wing leading edge, with tall radiators on either side of the fuselage. It drove a two-bladed propeller via a long drive shaft within a markedly tapered nose. The Special had a pair of strut mounted main floats, supplemented with small wingtip and tail floats. The main floats were 16 ft 6 in (5.03 m) long, 2 ft 10 in (0.86 m) in the beam and 2 ft 4 in (0.71 m) deep, spaced 8 ft 6 in (2.59 m) apart. Each float had two sprung connections to its struttage.

The Special's performance turned out to be very disappointing. It was first taxi tested on 6 July 1914 at Calshot but would not take off. It flew for the first time three days later, though with only the pilot aboard and with little fuel. After it became clear that it could not lift its design load, it went back to Sopwith's for wing modifications. It returned to Calshot but was found still unfit for the torpedo dropping role. In November it was modified to carry bombs, but by January it was being broken up. In the meantime, a modified Short Admiralty Type 81 (S.84, RNAS serial 121) had become the first British aircraft to drop a torpedo, on 27 July 1914.

== Specifications ==
Data from British Aircraft Before the Great War

General characteristics

- Crew: 2
- Length: 36 ft 0 in (10.97 m)
- Upper wingspan: 66 ft 0 in (20.12 m)
- Lower wingspan: 58 ft 0 in (17.68 m)
- Height: 12 ft 10 in (3.91 m)
- Wing area: 785 sq ft (72.9 m^{2})
- Empty weight: 3,243 lb (1,471 kg)
- Gross weight: 4,324 lb (1,961 kg) with fuel for 2 hours and torpedo
- Powerplant: 1 × Salmson 2M7 (Canton-Unné) 14-cylinder, 2-row, water-cooled radial, 200 hp (150 kW)
- Propellers: 2-bladed, 9 ft (2.7 m) diameter

== See also ==
Related development

- Sopwith Admiralty Type C

Related lists

- List of flying boats and floatplanes
