= Albatros W.5 =

W.5
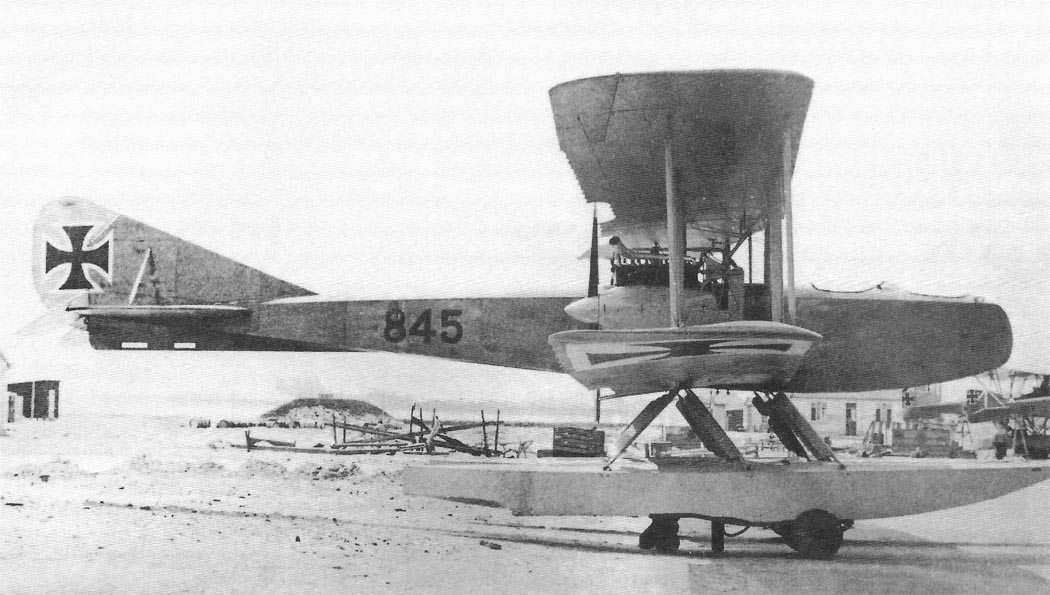

General information
- Type: Torpedo bomber
- Manufacturer: Albatros Flugzeugwerke
- Number built: 5

The Albatros W.5 was a floatplane torpedo bomber used by Germany during World War I. It was a biplane with twin pusher engines.

== Operators ==
German Empire

- Imperial German Navy

== Specifications (W.5) ==
Data from German Aircraft of World War I

General characteristics

- Crew: three
- Length: 13.10 m (43 ft 0 in)
- Wingspan: 22.7 m (74 ft 5 in)
- Height: 4.25 m (13 ft 11 in)
- Gross weight: 3,665 kg (8,080 lb)
- Powerplant: 2 × Benz Bz.III , 112 kW (150 hp) each

Performance

- Maximum speed: 133 km/h (83 mph, 72 kn)
- Range: 490 km (300 mi, 260 nmi)

Armament

- Torpedoes

== Bibliography ==
- Gray, Peter & Thetford, Owen (1987) [1970]. German Aircraft of the First World War (2nd ed.). Putnam. ISBN 0-85177-809-7.
- Herris, Jack (2017). Albatros Aircraft of WWI: A Centennial Perspective on Great War Airplanes: Volume 3: Bombers, Seaplanes, J-Types. Great War Aviation Centennial Series. Vol. 26. Aeronaut Books. ISBN 978-1-935881-49-0.
- Schmeelke, Michael (2020). "Torpedo Los!": The German Imperial Torpedo-Flieger. Aeronaut Books. ISBN 978-1-953201-17-1.
