= Torpedo bomber =

Naval attack aircraft

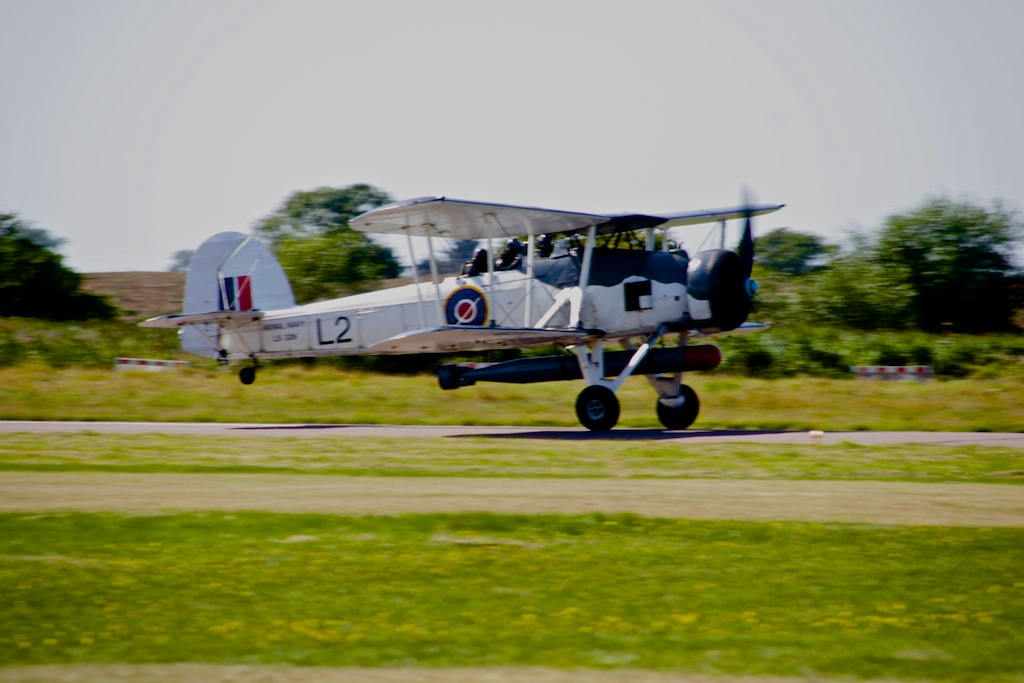
A Fairey Swordfish carrying a dummy torpedo

A torpedo bomber is a military aircraft designed primarily to attack ships with aerial torpedoes. Torpedo bombers came into existence just before the First World War almost as soon as aircraft were built that were capable of carrying the weight of a torpedo, and remained an important aircraft type until they were rendered obsolete by anti-ship missiles. They were an important element in many famous Second World War battles, notably the British attack at Taranto, the sinking of the German battleship Bismarck, the sinking of the British battleship HMS Prince Of Wales and the British battlecruiser HMS Repulse and the Japanese attack on Pearl Harbor.

== Types ==
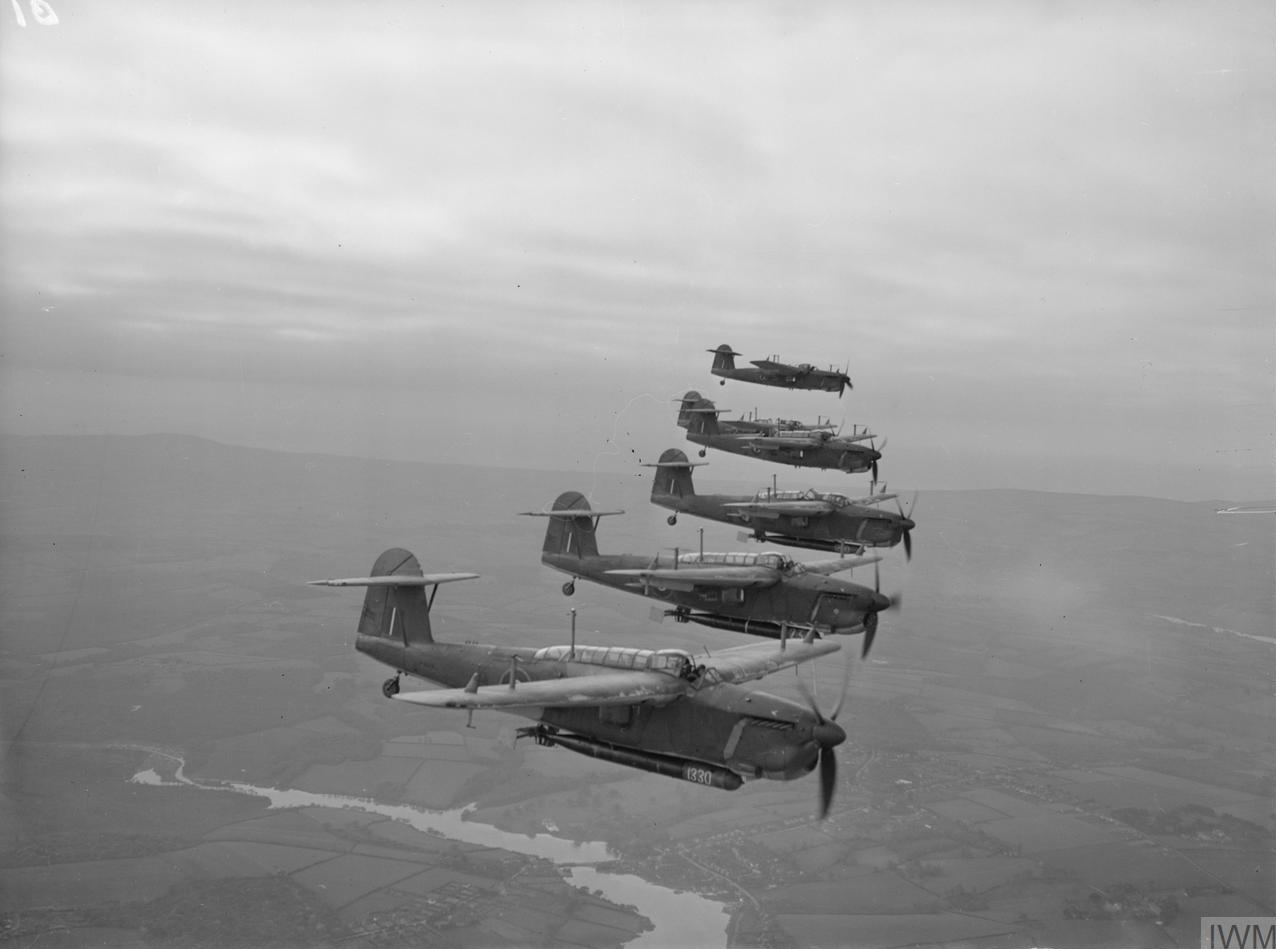
A formation of Fairey Barracudas during World War II

Torpedo bombers first appeared immediately prior to the First World War. Generally, they carried torpedoes specifically designed for air launch, which were smaller and lighter than those used by submarines and surface warships. Nonetheless, as an airborne torpedo could weigh as much as 2,000 pounds (900 kg), more than twice the bomb load of contemporary single-engined bombers, the aircraft carrying it usually needed to be specially designed for the purpose. Many early torpedo bombers were floatplanes, such as the Short 184 (the first aircraft to sink a ship with a torpedo), and the undercarriage had to be redesigned so that the torpedo could be dropped from the aircraft's centerline.

While many torpedo bombers were single-engine aircraft, some multi-engined aircraft have also been used as torpedo bombers, with the Mitsubishi G3M Nell and Mitsubishi G4M Betty being used in the sinking of HMS Prince of Wales and Repulse. Other twin-engine or three-engined aircraft designed or used as torpedo bombers include the Mitsubishi Ki-67, the Savoia-Marchetti SM.79 "Sparviero", the CANT Z.1007, the Bristol Beaufort and Bristol Beaufighter ("Torbeau"), the Junkers Ju 88, the Heinkel He 111, the North American B-25 Mitchell and many others.

Some postwar jet aircraft (such as the Ilyushin Il-28T) were adapted as torpedo bombers in the late 1940s and 1950s. The last known torpedo bomber attack was made by US Navy Douglas A-1 Skyraiders against the Hwacheon Dam during the Korean War. The North Korean Air Force finally retired the world's last operational torpedo bombers in the 1980s.

In a parallel development, many maritime strike aircraft and helicopters have been capable of launching guided torpedoes; however, they are not generally referred to as torpedo bombers because of their vastly greater detection and tracking capabilities, although they remain just as capable of making attacks on surface ships as against submarines.

== History ==
Many naval staffs began to appreciate the possibility of using aircraft to launch torpedoes against moored ships in the period before the First World War. Captain Alessandro Guidoni, an Italian naval captain, experimented with dropping weights from a Farman MF.7 in 1912. which led to Raúl Pateras Pescara and Guidoni developing a purpose-built torpedo bomber from which a 375 lb (170 kg) dummy torpedo was dropped in February 1914 but they abandoned their work shortly afterwards when the aircraft's performance proved inadequate. Admiral Bradley A. Fiske of the United States Navy took out a patent in 1912 for a torpedo carrying aircraft entitled "Method of and apparatus for delivering submarine torpedoes from airships." He suggested that aircraft would attack at night. Winston Churchill, as First Lord of the Admiralty from October 1911 to May 1915, was a strong proponent of naval air power. He established the Royal Naval Air Service in April 1912 and took flying lessons to foster aviation development. Churchill ordered the RNAS to design reconnaissance spotters and torpedo bombers for the Fleet.

=== First torpedo bombers ===
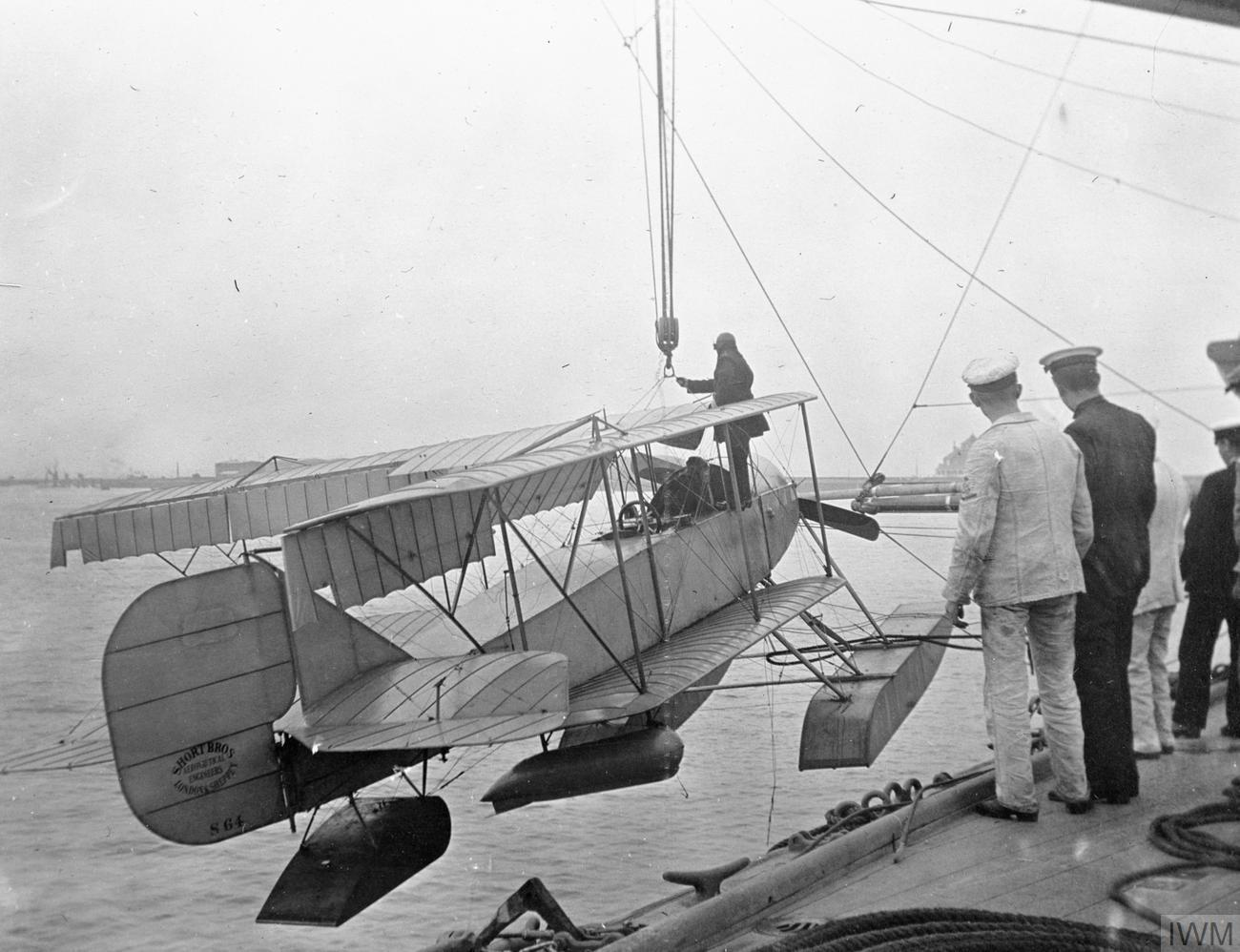
Short Folder 81 being hoisted aboard the cruiser HMS Hermes

The British Admiralty ordered the Short Admiralty Type 81 biplane floatplane as a reconnaissance aircraft. It first flew in July 1913 and was loaded aboard the cruiser HMS Hermes, which had been converted to become the Royal Navy's first seaplane tender. When the rival Sopwith Special, designed from the outset as a torpedo bomber, failed to lift its payload off the water, Shorts converted the Type 81 to carry torpedoes in July 1914, just before the outbreak of the First World War.

On 28 July 1914, Arthur Longmore dropped the first aerial torpedo, a 14-inch (360 mm), 810 lb (370 kg) torpedo, from a Type 81 at the Royal Naval Air Station Calshot. The support wires of the floats were moved to allow the torpedo to be carried above the water and a specially designed quick-release mechanism was used.

The first plane designed from the outset as a torpedo bomber was the five-seat floatplane biplane AD Seaplane Type 1000 or AD1. However, it proved to be a failure. When the prototype built by J. Samuel White from the Isle of Wight first flew in June 1916, it was found to be too heavy and its float struts too weak for operations. Remaining orders were cancelled.

=== First World War ===
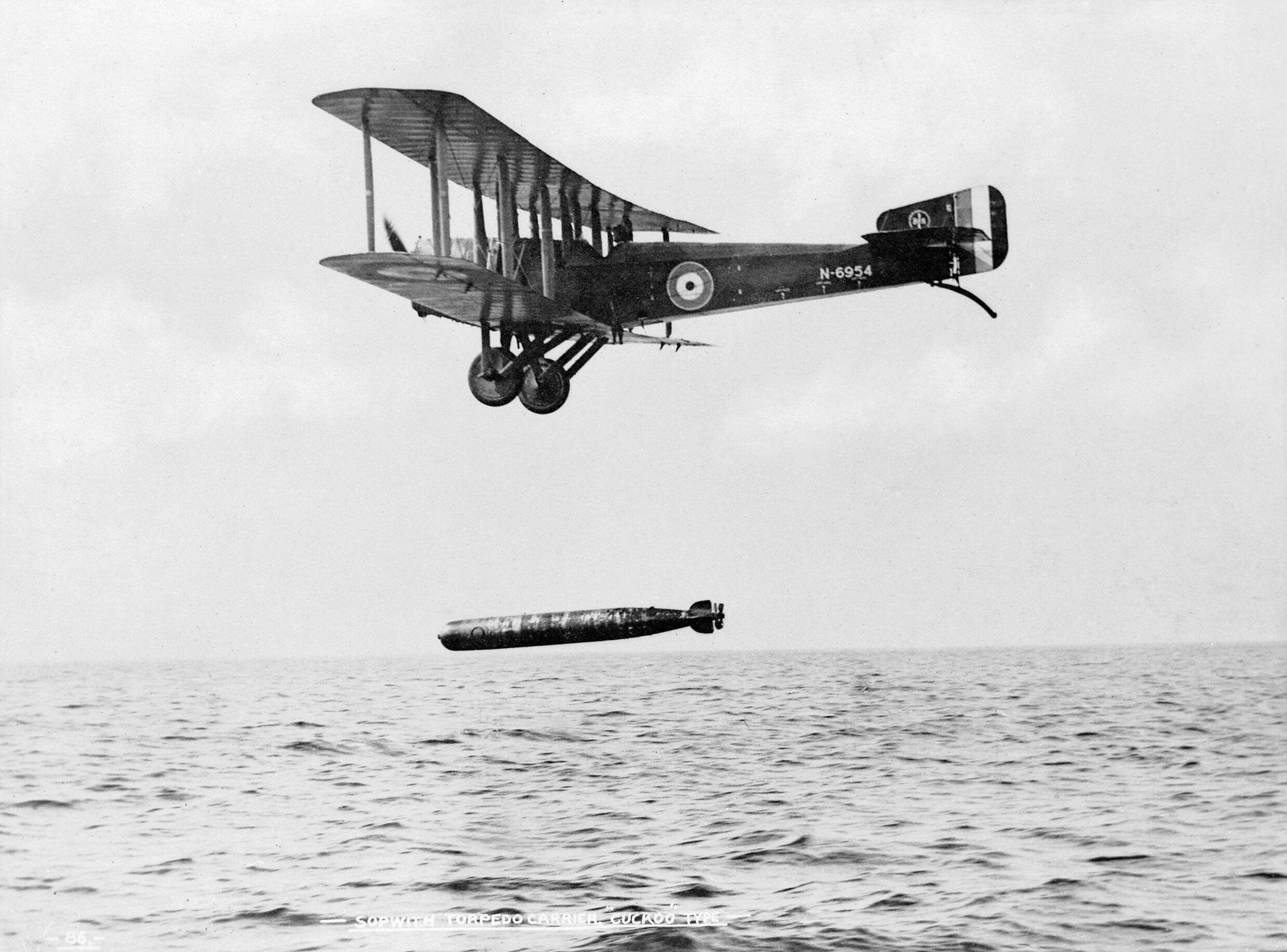
A Sopwith Cuckoo dropping an aerial torpedo during World War I

On 12 August 1915, a Royal Naval Air Service Short 184 floatplane torpedo bomber sank a Turkish merchantman in the Sea of Marmara. It was operating from HMS Ben-my-Chree, a seaplane carrier converted from a ferry. Fitted with an aircraft hangar, Ben-my-Chree was used to carry up to six biplanes with their wings folded back to reduce carrying space.

This was the first ship sunk by air-launched torpedo. Five days later, another ship supplying Turkish forces in the Gallipoli campaign against British, Australian and New Zealand troops was also sunk.

Production of the Short 184 continued until after the Armistice of 11 November 1918, with a total of 936 built by several manufacturers. It served in eight navies, including the Imperial Japanese Navy, which built them under licence.

The first torpedo bomber designed for operation from aircraft carriers was the Sopwith Cuckoo. First flown in June 1917, it was designed to take off from the Royal Navy's new aircraft carriers, but had to land on an airfield as arrester wires, needed to stop an aircraft during landing on a ship, had not yet been perfected. The Admiralty planned to use five carriers and 100-120 Cuckoos to attack the German High Seas Fleet, which had been sheltering in Kiel since the Battle of Jutland in 1916 but when the war ended only 90 Cuckoos had been completed.

The Vickers Vimy twin-engine heavy bomber was designed to bomb German cities in retribution for German air attacks on England. It reached squadrons in France too late to play a role in the First World War. Had the war continued, it would have been deployed as a torpedo bomber.

=== Interwar years ===
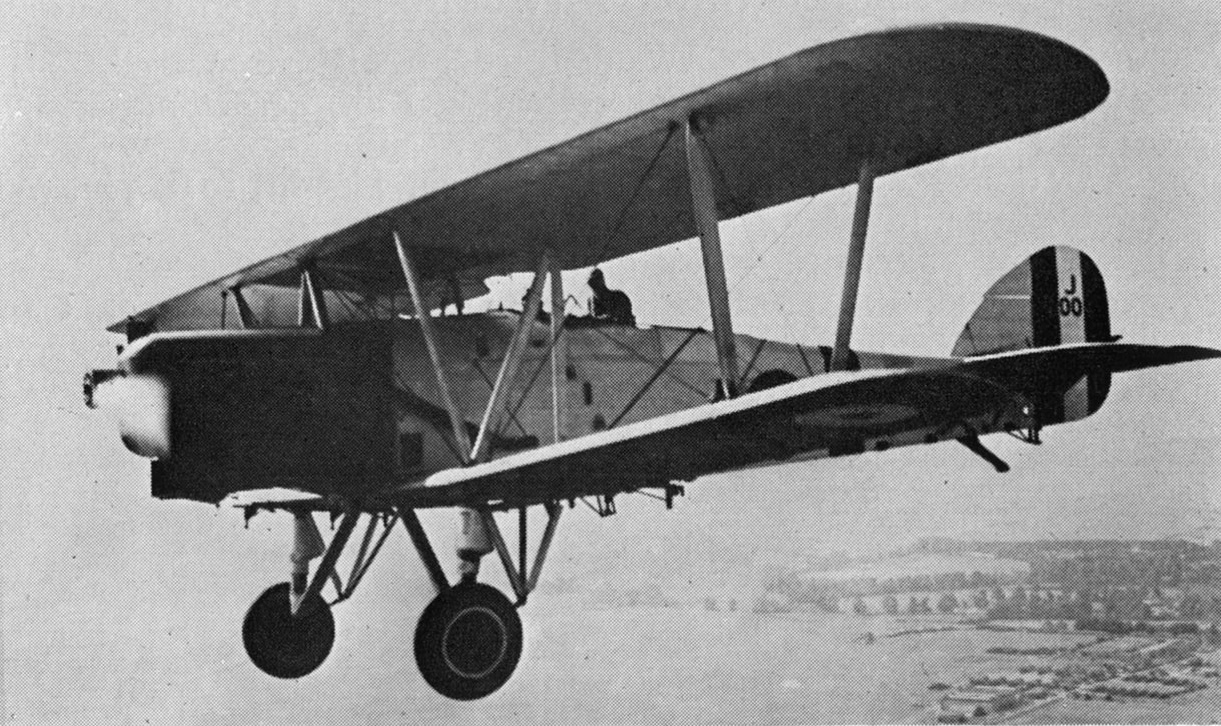
The Hawker Horsley

Of the major maritime nations, only Britain, Japan and the United States developed carrier-borne torpedo bombers after hostilities ceased in Europe. Initially, Japan purchased both ships and aircraft from Britain, as the Imperial Japanese Navy modelled itself on the Royal Navy. Of the three, only Britain and Japan also perceived a need for land-based torpedo bombers, though a number would be developed by other countries. Bordered by oceans against any possible foe, the United States ignored landplane torpedo bomber development.

The first landplane specifically designed as a torpedo bomber was the Hawker Horsley. By the mid 1930s, the torpedo bombers that would start the Second World War were being deployed. The Fairey Swordfish flew first in 1934, the Douglas TBD Devastator and Mitsubishi G3M (Nell) in 1935 and the Nakajima B5N (Kate) and Bristol Beaufort a year after that.

=== Second World War ===
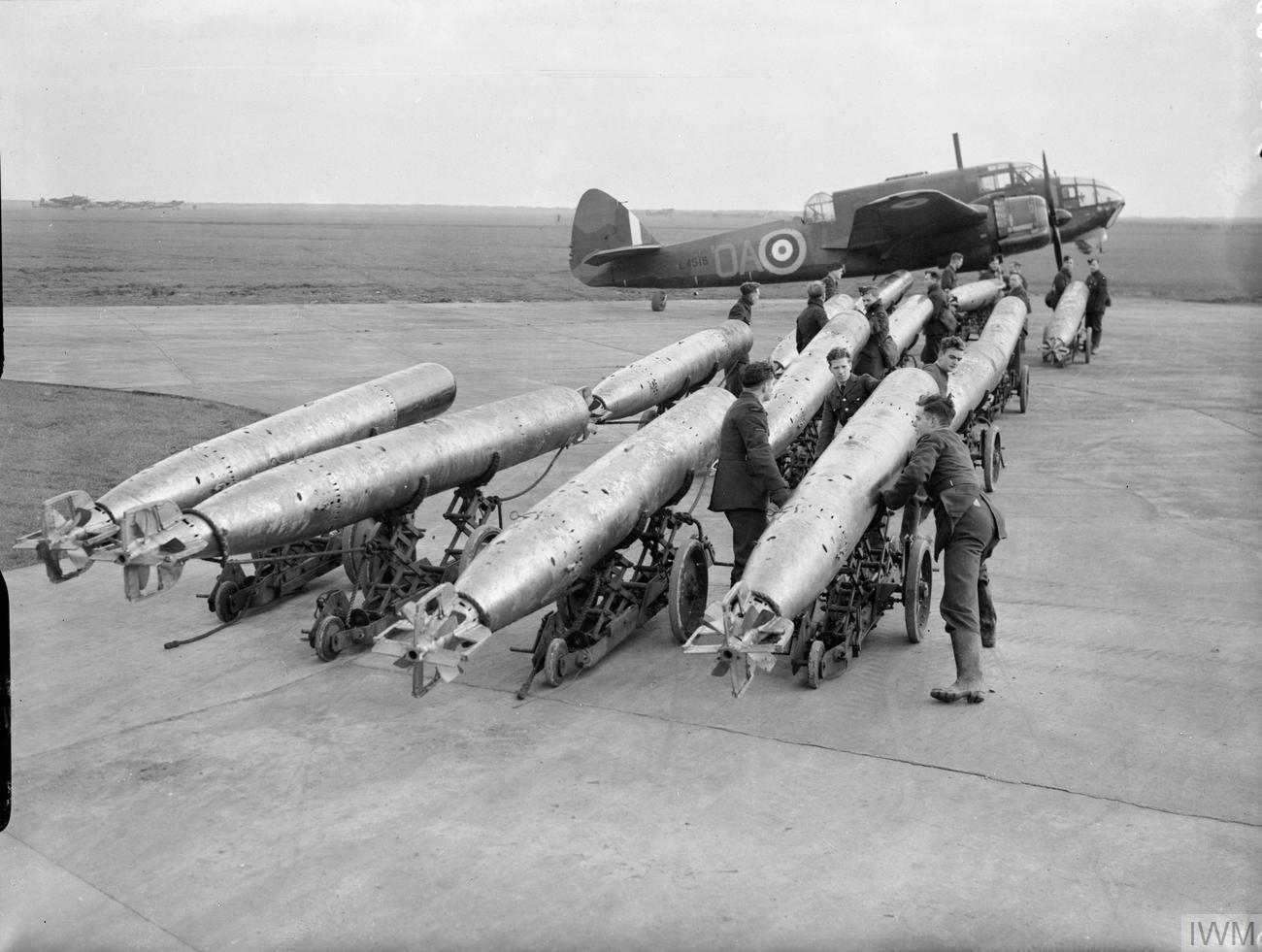
A Bristol Beaufort being loaded with torpedo

Even before the outbreak of the Second World War, the Royal Navy had studied the threat in the Mediterranean posed by the Italian fleet, which had its advance base in the new port of Taranto in the "heel" of Italy. Captain Lumley Lyster of the aircraft carrier HMS Glorious proposed that his Fairey Swordfish torpedo bombers could launch a night attack against Taranto. At that time, the Royal Navy was the only force in the world with this capability. The Swordfish, a three-seat biplane, looked outmoded, but its low stall speed made it an ideal platform for launching torpedoes into the shallow waters of Taranto. The torpedoes were adapted with wire cables attached to their nose and wooden fins at their tail to slow their fall and make a shallow impact with the water, which was only 39 ft (12 m) deep.

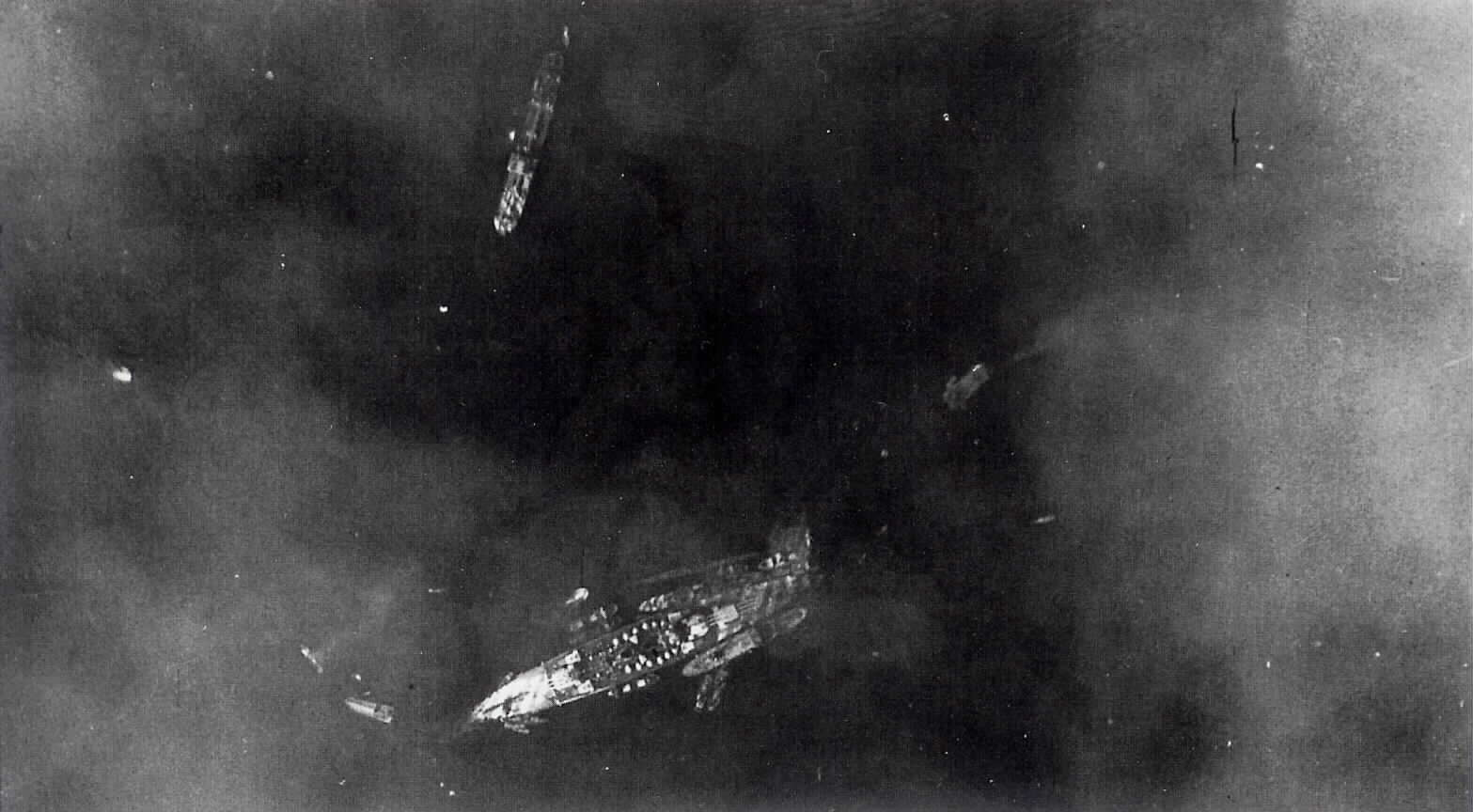
The damaged battleship Littorio after the Taranto attack

On the night of 11 November 1940, 21 Swordfish left the new aircraft carrier HMS Illustrious. Some carried bombs and flares, but the main force carried torpedoes. British decoy maneuvers and the Italians' lack of radar allowed the British to surprise the ill-prepared Italian fleet at anchor in Taranto. Three battleships were put out of action, half of the Italian fleet, for the loss of two Swordfish. Two airmen were killed and two others captured. The next day, the remaining Italian battleships withdrew to Naples, ceding control of the Mediterranean to the British.

On 6 April 1941, a single Bristol Beaufort piloted by Flying Officer Kenneth Campbell attacked the German battleship Gneisenau in Brest harbour in Brittany, where she and her sister ship, Scharnhorst, were sheltering beneath a massive array of anti-aircraft guns. The other five Beauforts on the mission failed to rendezvous due to bad weather. Campbell received a posthumous Victoria Cross for launching his solo torpedo attack, which put Gneisenau out of action for six months.

At 1900 hours on 26 May 1941, fifteen Fairey Swordfish were launched from the Royal Navy's carrier HMS Ark Royal to attack the German battleship Bismarck. Their formation was badly disrupted by heavy clouds and driving rain which resulted in a series of piecemeal attacks. However, two torpedoes hit the Bismarck, one of which jammed the rudder leaving the ship without proper directional control. The next day the Bismarck was sunk by British battleships and cruisers.

In the early hours of 13 June 1941, two Beauforts found the German cruiser Lützow off Norway. The first was mistaken for a Junkers Ju 88 and was able to torpedo the Lützow without return fire, putting her out of action for six months. The second was shot down by defending Messerschmitt Bf 109s.

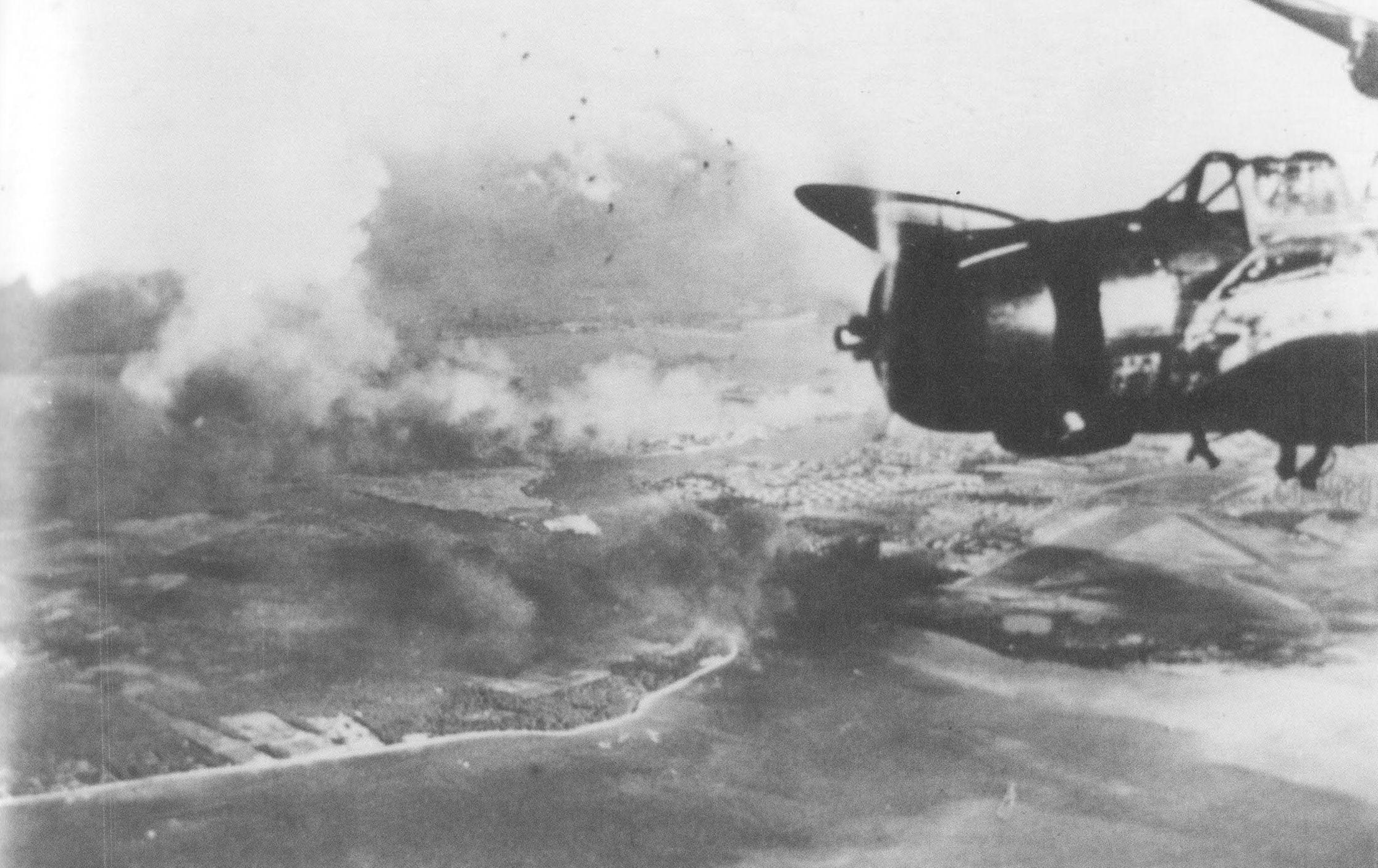
A Japanese B5N from the Kaga attacking Pearl Harbor

In the attack on Pearl Harbor, Admiral Isoroku Yamamoto's fleet of six carriers launched 40 Nakajima B5N2 Kate torpedo bombers on Sunday, 7 December 1941. The Japanese struck the United States Pacific Fleet when it was moored in harbour. The torpedo bombers coordinated their attacks with dive bombers; the combined effort sank or damaged all eight of the battleships which they found moored in Pearl Harbor. The Japanese had studied the attack on Taranto and had practiced dropping specially modified Type 91 torpedoes in the shallow waters of Japan's Inland Sea. The Type 91 torpedo was considerably more capable than any others in the world at that time, being very fast and reliable, as well as allowing a much higher launch speed from a much greater altitude than other types. Only five Kates were lost in the attack. In later months, torpedo bombers were responsible for the sinking of the American aircraft carriers Lexington and Hornet, and damaging Yorktown. During the war, Japanese torpedo bombers (mainly the Nakajima B5N) played a key role in the fatal crippling of the carriers USS Lexington (scuttled as a result of an internal explosion), USS Yorktown (sunk by a Japanese submarine while being towed), and USS Hornet (abandoned and finished off by US and Japanese surface ships).

Three days after the attack on Pearl Harbor, Admiral Sir Tom Phillips was returning to Singapore on board the new battleship HMS Prince of Wales after an unsuccessful attempt to impede Japanese landings in Malaya. His fleet included the First World War battlecruiser HMS Repulse and should also have had the new aircraft carrier HMS Indomitable with a squadron of Sea Hurricanes. But the carrier was delayed for repairs after running aground in the harbour at Kingston, Jamaica. Eight Mitsubishi G3M Nell twin-engine level bombers and 17 Nell torpedo bombers found the two capital ships without air cover in broad daylight. They scored just a single bomb hit on Repulse and a single torpedo hit on Prince of Wales. The torpedo struck where the outer port propeller shaft exited the hull and Prince of Wales took on 2,400 t (2,400 long tons; 2,600 short tons) of water through a ruptured stern gland. The battleship listed 12 degrees to port preventing the starboard side 5.25 inch anti-aircraft guns from depressing low enough to deter more torpedo bombers. A second squadron, this time of Mitsubishi G4M Betty torpedo bombers, now attacked both ships. Repulse had dodged 19 torpedoes by skillful steering, but now G4Ms attacked the bow from both sides and scored another hit. At about this point, Repulse radioed for defensive fighters. A squadron of 10 Royal Australian Air Force Brewster Buffalos arrived an hour later to watch Prince of Wales sink. Repulse had already sunk. Each ship had been hit by four torpedoes out of 49 fired. The Japanese lost four aircraft. Neither G3Ms nor G4Ms carried defensive armament, which had been stripped to extend their range. The presence of modern Allied fighters to defend the two capital ships might have led to a different outcome.

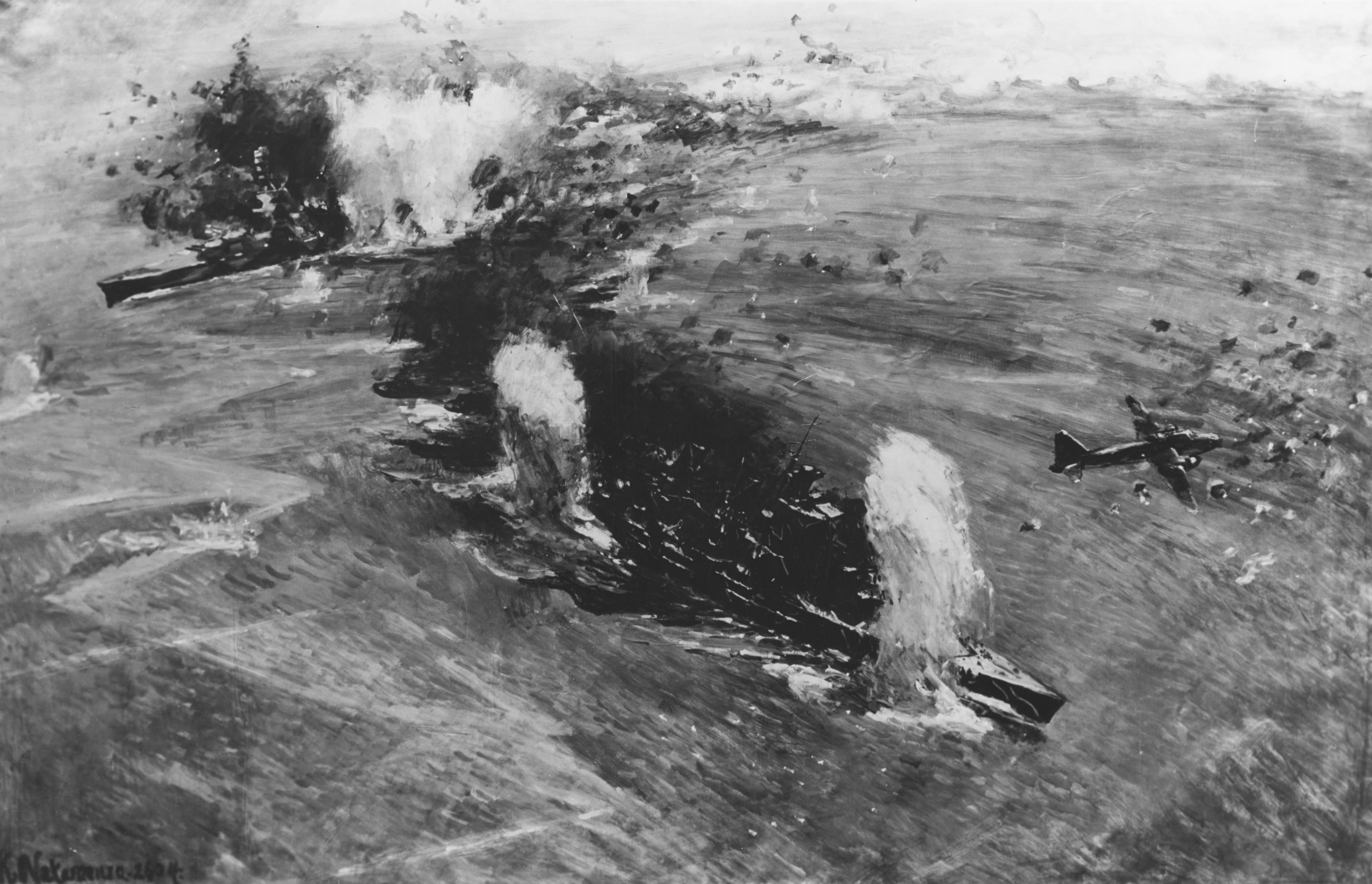
An artist rendition of the sinking of HMS Prince of Wales and HMS Repulse

On 12 February 1942, Bristol Beauforts were dispatched to intercept the German cruiser Prinz Eugen off Trondheim, Norway. Prinz Eugen had accompanied Bismarck into the Atlantic, but returned to Brest. For the first time, the Beauforts were accompanied by Bristol Beaufighters and Bristol Blenheims. In a new RAF tactic, the Blenheims acted as decoys, making pretense torpedo runs, while the Beaufighters, a development of the Beaufort fitted with four 20 mm (0.79 in) cannon, shot up the anti-aircraft gunners. This was intended to give the Beauforts a clear torpedo run. However, none of the 28 Beauforts achieved a hit, and three aircraft were lost.

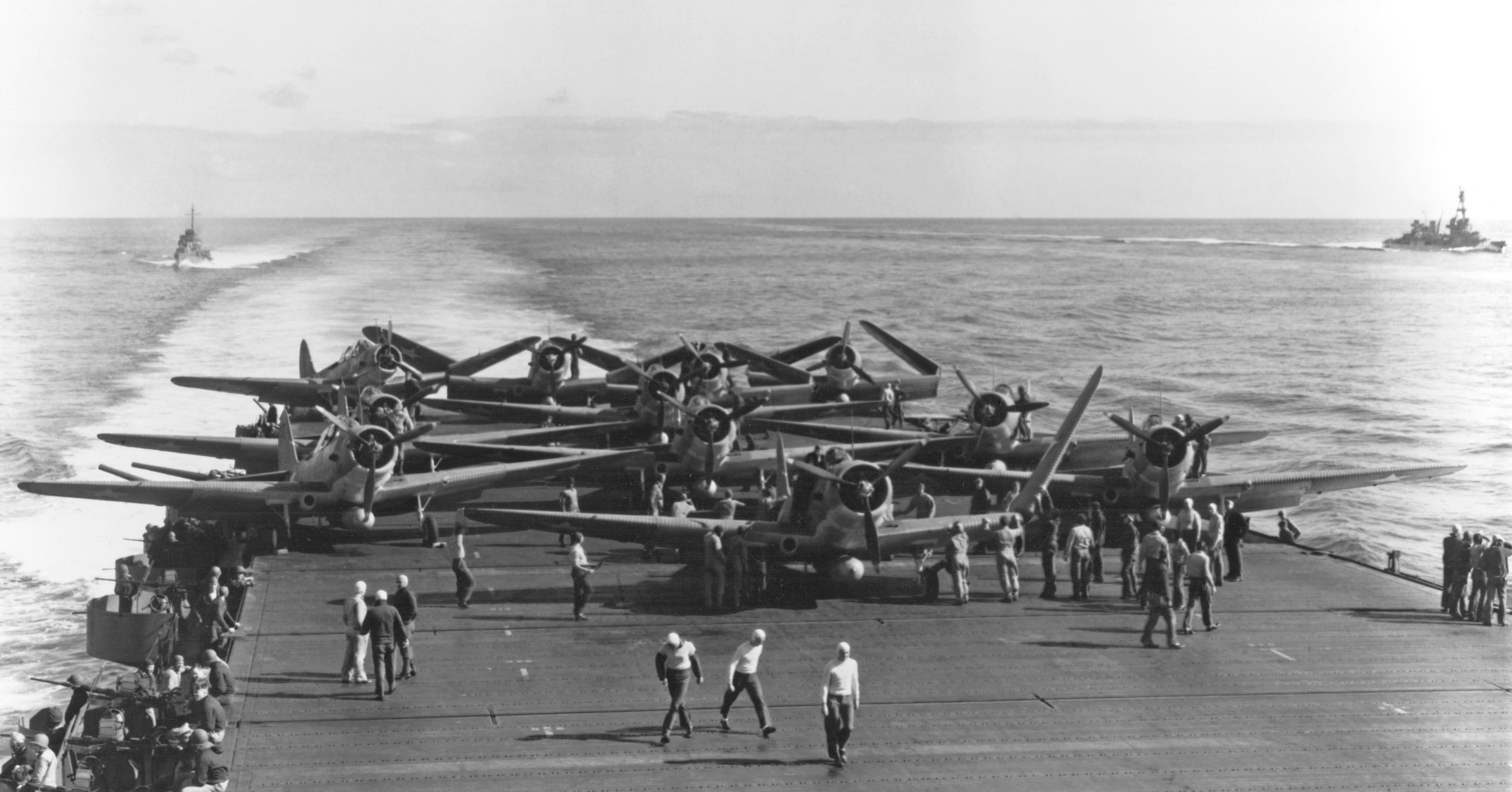
TBD Devastators on USS Enterprise during the Battle of Midway

The United States Navy's standard torpedo bomber in 1942 was the Douglas TBD Devastator, first flown in 1935 and embarked on carriers of the Pacific Fleet in 1937. On 7 May 1942, Devastators sank the Japanese aircraft carrier Shōhō in the Battle of the Coral Sea, but failed to sink the aircraft carrier Shōkaku the next day.

At the Battle of Midway on 4 June 1942, 41 Devastators launched from three American carriers failed to score a single torpedo hit, and only six aircraft returned, as the rest fell to the Mitsubishi A6M Zero combat air patrols and ships' anti-aircraft fire. The attacks had been poorly coordinated, but the Devastator sorties were credited with pulling the defending A6M Zeros out of position, as well as preventing the Japanese carriers from launching their aircraft, so three of the four carriers were caught with their hangar decks full of fueled and armed planes when the American dive bombers struck by surprise. Nonetheless, the Devastator was immediately withdrawn from front-line service. The successor to the Devastator, the Grumman TBF Avenger, arrived too late at Pearl Harbor to be loaded onto carriers for the Battle of Midway. However, six were flown from Midway Island. They fared no better, with five lost without a single hit.

Avengers became more successful as tactics improved and crews became more skilled. On 24 August 1942, 24 Avengers sank the light carrier Ryūjō at the Battle of the Eastern Solomons. At Guadalcanal, Avengers from the Navy and Marine Corps helped to finish off the battleship Hiei, which had lost steering after being damaged the prior night.

Beauforts also had more success when they moved to Malta to attack Italian warships and transport. Flying Officer Arthur Aldridge discovered a convoy guarded by the heavy cruiser Trento early on 14 June 1942 some 200 miles (320 km) east of Malta. As in the attack on Lützow, the Beaufort was mistaken for a Junkers Ju 88, and Aldridge hit Trento with his torpedo; the ship was eventually finished off by the submarine HMS Umbra (P35), which was close by.

At the Battle of the Sibuyan Sea, with little or no Japanese air cover opposing them, US carrier aircraft concentrated most of their attacks against Musashi, sinking her with about 19 torpedoes that caused heavy flooding which disabled her engineering (dive bombers also scored around 17 bomb hits), while an aerial torpedo crippled the heavy cruiser Myōkō, which was never repaired for the remainder of the war.

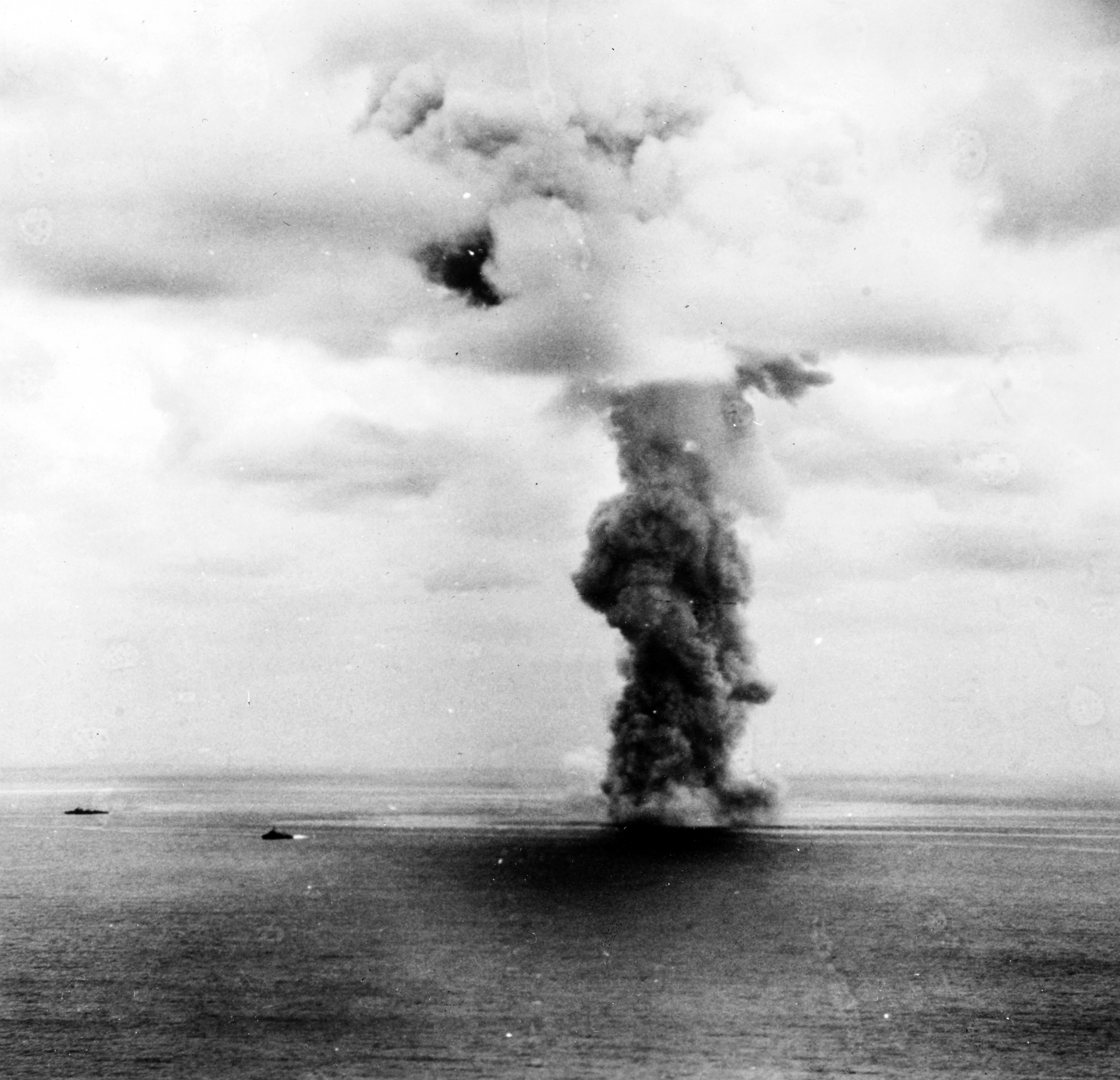
Explosion of the battleship Yamato after being attacked by US Navy aircraft.

Action continued in the Pacific, where the last notable torpedo bomber attack took place on 7 April 1945. Avengers from Yorktown were searching between Okinawa and Honshu for the Japanese battleship Yamato, which was escorted by cruisers and destroyers. Her mission was to run aground on Okinawa to provide floating heavy artillery for the defending troops in the expected Allied seaborne invasion. Her 18.1-inch (460 mm) guns could have created havoc among frail landing craft. Yamato and her sister the Musashi were the largest, most powerful battleships in the world. The squadron led by Lieutenant Tom Stetson found the cruiser, which was the prime target, already sinking, so six planes were detached to attack the Yamato instead. One in which Frederick E. Wicklund was the tail gunner and radar/radio operator became detached from the formation whilst climbing in heavy cloud cover. The pilot, Lieutenant Grady Jean, asked each crewman in turn if they wished to make a solo attack, which was likely to prove suicidal. The crew referred the decision to the skipper, who deftly dodged anti-aircraft fire and 18-inch shell splashes from the Yamato's big guns to release their torpedo. Wicklund had recalled from a briefing that the Yamato had torpedo blisters to a depth of 22 ft (6.7 m), so he crawled back in the fuselage to reset the torpedo's running depth from the 10 ft (3.0 m) preset for the cruiser to 23 ft (7.0 m). He later explained that he heard no command to do this and doubted whether the other five planes had done so. In their case, their torpedoes would have exploded harmlessly against the blisters. A crewman photographed the explosion, in which debris rose to their altitude of 300 feet (90 m). Possibly a torpedo had hit the fuel storage. The Yamato rolled over and sank, with the loss of 90 percent of the crew. The Yorktown lost ten planes and twelve aircrew. All pilots involved in the attack were awarded the Navy Medal and every crewman the Distinguished Flying Cross.

=== Replacement and obsolescence ===
The torpedoes in use during the early 20th century travelled under water at about 40 knots (74 km/h; 46 mph) – a speed easily matched by destroyers and even fast battleships which could make 32 knots (59 km/h; 37 mph). Consequently, a skillful captain could often evade torpedoes. For instance, when HMS Repulse came under attack on 10 December 1941, she avoided 19 torpedoes, before Japanese aircraft attacked simultaneously from both forward quarters.

Caltech developed the 5 in (130 mm) "Holy Moses" High Velocity Aircraft Rocket, with a 24 lb (11 kg) warhead for the US Navy. It was rushed to Europe for use on D-Day and later used by Navy aircraft in the Pacific.

==== Multi-role attack/strike aircraft ====
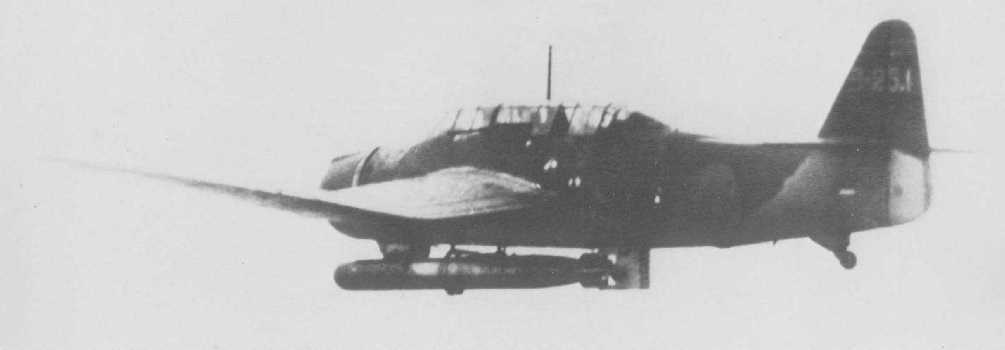
A Japanese B7A Ryusei (Comet) torpedo dive bomber.

By the beginning of the Second World War, aircraft technology had increased to the extent that specialised torpedo bombers were no longer necessary.

Multi-role designs were often adapted from either: single-engined, carrier-based dive-bombers like the Aichi B7A Ryusei, Curtiss SB2C Helldiver and Fairey Barracuda, or; land-based twin-engined light bombers/attack aircraft, such as the Bristol Beaufighter, Douglas A-20C (Boston IIIA), Junkers Ju 88, and Tupolev Tu-2.

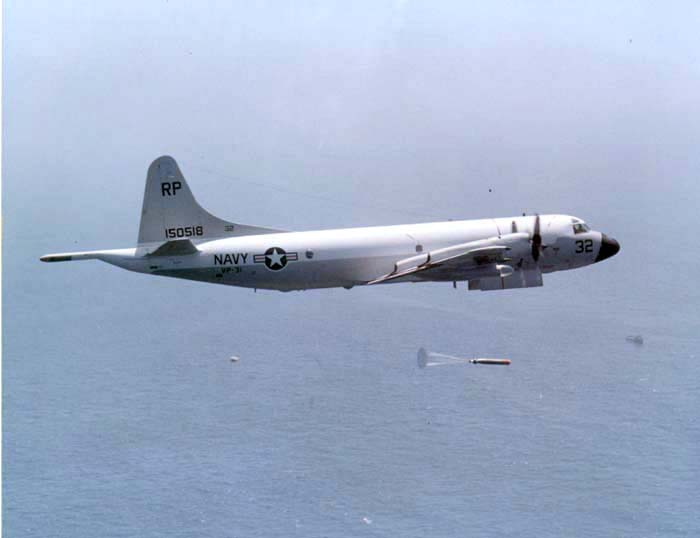
A P-3 Orion dropping an anti-submarine torpedo

As the war progressed, single-seat designs also emerged – omitting the roles of gunner, bombardier/bomb-aimer or observer. This configuration was favoured by the US Navy, in particular, and included the Martin AM Mauler and Douglas A-1 Skyraider, both of which could carry up to three torpedoes. Another concept, the torpedo fighter, also known as the strike fighter, was intended to also have air superiority capabilities – when it was not carrying or had dropped its torpedo. However, the radically differing requirements of these two roles created design constraints that made it difficult for a single design to excel at both. While some torpedo fighters were put into production, such as the Fiat G.55S and Blackburn Firebrand, they seldom launched torpedoes at enemy ships.

From 1946, the US Navy officially discarded its separate designations for dive and torpedo bombers, and introduced a single "Attack" designation, similar to that already used by the USAAF. Conversely, the naval air services of the UK and other Commonwealth countries, persisted with specialised torpedo bombers such as the Grumman Avenger until the early 1960s.

While the importance of air-launched torpedoes declined, relative to anti-ship missiles, during the Cold War and subsequently, they were retained by many air services and are now generally delivered by anti-submarine warfare and maritime patrol aircraft.

== Tactics ==
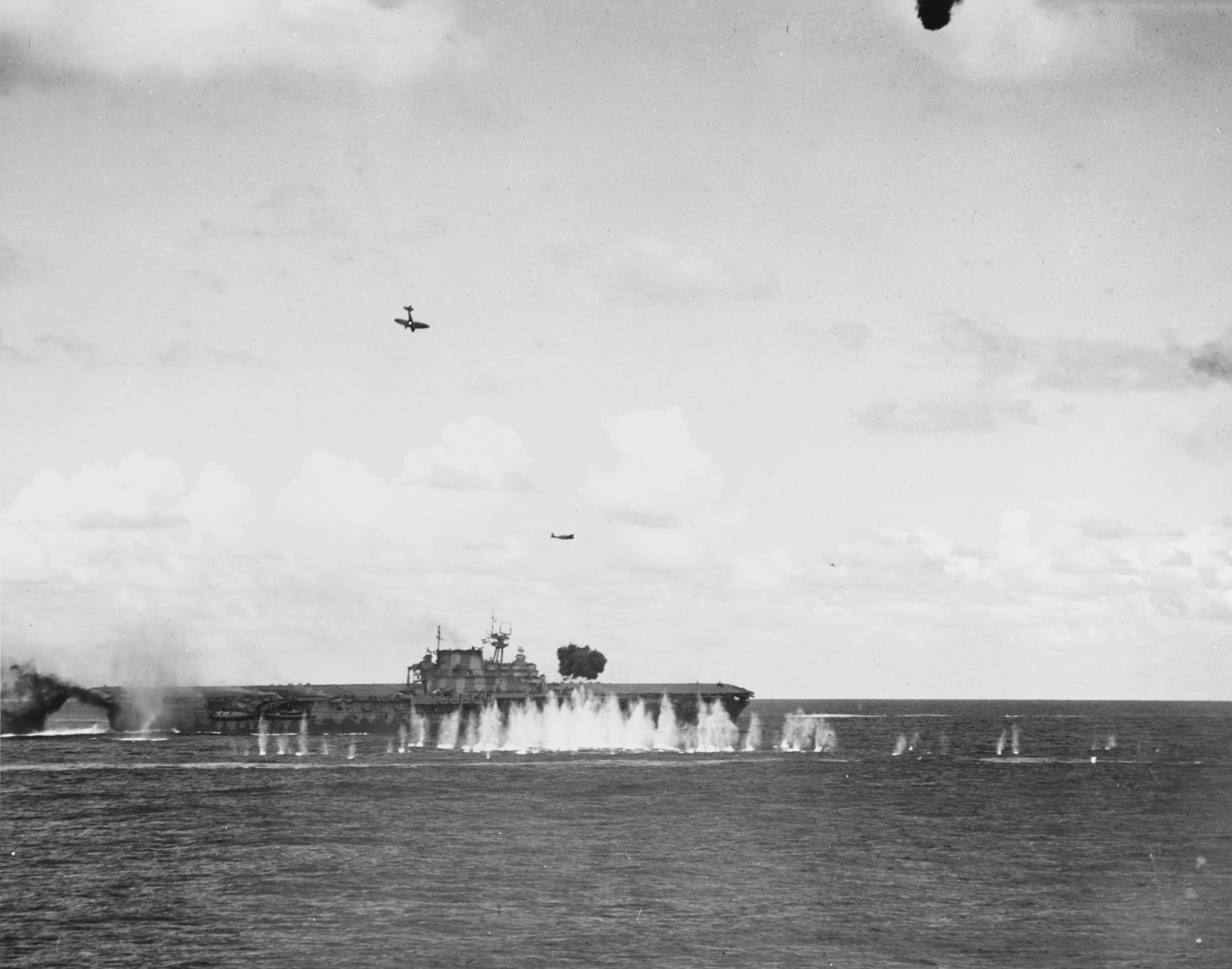
The Japanese coordinated attack on the USS Hornet during the battle of Santa Cruz

One crucial limitation of a torpedo bomber was that it had to fly a long, straight course at a constant altitude of 100 feet (30 m) toward the target ship before launching its torpedo. Torpedoes were very complicated weapons and were prone to damage when landing on water, especially on a wave; they were ideally aimed at the bottom of a wave, but this was difficult to achieve in practice.

During a torpedo run, the attacking aircraft were easy targets for defending combat air patrol fighters. Furthermore, torpedo planes were also highly vulnerable to anti-aircraft fire.

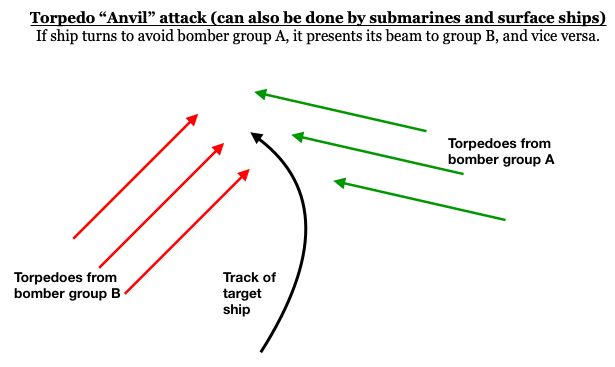
"Anvil" torpedo attack

In the 1930s, the Imperial Japanese Navy developed the best way for torpedo bombers to achieve a hit. They used an "anvil attack", in which two groups of torpedo planes approached the target ship's bow from behind at an angle of about 45 degrees, one on each side of the ship. The torpedoes were to be launched at the same distance from the ship; this would have ensured a hit no matter where the ship tried to maneuver. In practice, this kind of attack was difficult to coordinate and therefore extremely rare. Usually, combat air patrols and anti-aircraft fire quickly broke up approaching plane formations, forcing each aircraft to attack on its own. At Pearl Harbor, the ships were lined up and basically stationary, so the first attack wave of 40 torpedo bombers armed with Type 91 torpedoes, out of 183 planes, were able to hit the ships broadside, as the defenders were caught by surprise.

Torpedo bombers were best used as part of a coordinated attack with other types of aircraft. For instance, during the attack on the battleship Yamato, fighter planes strafed the ship with machine guns to suppress its anti-aircraft gun fire, while dive bombers tried to cause havoc and inflict topside damage, thus leaving the torpedo bombers unmolested in their attack runs. In total it took 12 torpedoes and 8 bombs to destroy the pride of the imperial Japanese Navy.

Another instance, during the attack on battleship Musashi, fighter planes strafed the ship with machine guns to suppress its anti-aircraft gun fire, while dive bombers caused major topside damage, She holds the distinction of taking 19 torpedoes and 17 bombs before she sank to the bottom of the Sibuyan Sea.

However, if the attackers failed to achieve air superiority or surprise, torpedo bombers suffered heavy losses, regardless of whether the type was obsolete or not. This is best exemplified at the Battle of Midway, where Air Group Eight's dive bombers missed the Japanese carriers. Torpedo Squadron 8 (VT-8, from Hornet), led by Lieutenant Commander John C. Waldron, sighted the enemy carriers and attacked without any coordination with dive bombers or fighter cover. Without fighter escort, every TBD Devastator of VT-8 was shot down without inflicting any damage, with Ensign George H. Gay, Jr. being the only survivor. VT-8 was followed by Torpedo Squadron 6 (VT-6, from Enterprise). VT-6 met nearly the same fate, with no hits to show for its effort. Torpedo Squadron 3 (from Yorktown) then followed the same routine, despite VT-3 having six Grumman F4F Wildcat fighter escorts. The Japanese combat air patrol, flying the much faster Mitsubishi A6M2 "Zeros", made short work of the unescorted, slow, under-armed TBD torpedo bombers. A few TBDs managed to get within a few ship-lengths range of their targets before dropping their torpedoes.

At the Battle of the Santa Cruz Islands in 1942, the Nakajima B5N Kate, despite being in service since 1935, played a key role in sinking USS Hornet, while the new Grumman TBF Avenger torpedo bombers failed to hit a fleet carrier.

When the targets were ships able to maneuver at high speed and hence much harder to hit, torpedoes proved less effective, except in cases when the crews launching them were especially well trained. Still, even a single torpedo hit on an enemy warship could cripple it decisively, especially in the case of vessels without an armored belt (cruisers and aircraft carriers often had torpedo blisters, but these were not as extensive as those of battleships). Even on heavily armored battleships, there was nothing to protect the rudder and propellers at the stern, as was demonstrated in the cases of the Bismarck and HMS Prince of Wales and HMS Repulse, and few had their protective belt extend to the extremities, and a hole made in the bow could be forced wider from the pressure of the water which could buckle and crush unarmored internal bulkheads, which worked against Musashi and Yamato.

== Notable torpedo bomber pilots ==
- Carlo Emanuele Buscaglia
- George H. W. Bush
- Kenneth Campbell
- Charles Edmonds
- Eugene Esmonde
- Mitsuo Fuchida
- George H. Gay, Jr.
- John Kelvin Koelsch
- John Moffat
- Ulvert M. Moore
- Vasily Minakov
- John C. Waldron

== See also ==
- List of torpedo bombers
