= List of aircraft (Mk–My) =

This is a list of aircraft in numerical order of manufacturer followed by alphabetical order beginning with 'Mk–My'.

== Mk–My ==
=== MKEK ===
(Turkish: Makina ve Kimya Endüstrisi Kurumu – Mechanical and Chemical Industry Corporation)

- MKEK-1 Gözcü (Turkish – "Observer")
- MKEK-2
- MKEK-3
- MKEK-4 Uğur (Turkish: "Luck")
- MKEK-5
- MKEK-6
- MKEK-7

=== ML Aviation ===
- M L Utility
- Malcolm Rotaplane

=== MMIST ===
(Mist Mobility Integrated Systems Technology)

- MMIST CQ-10A Snowgoose – parafoil
- MMIST CQ-10B Snowgoose – autogyro

=== MMPL ===
(Maintenance Command Development Centre, Kanpur)

- MMPL Kanpur

=== Mohawk ===
(Mohawk Aero Corp (Pres: Leon A Dahlem), 2639 Delaware St SE, Minneapolis, MN)

- Mohawk Cabin
- Mohawk M1C-K Pinto
- Mohawk Redskin
- Mohawk M1C-W Spurwing
- Mohawk M-2-C Chieftain
- Mohawk MLV Pinto
- Mohawk PT-7

=== Mohme ===
( (Leo) Mohme Aero Engr Corp, 108 Church St, New Brunswick, NJ)

- Mohme A-1
- Mohme A-2
- Mohme A-3
- Mohme MVP Sport A

=== Mohr ===
(Fred Mohr, Riceville, IA)

- Mohr 1928 Monoplane

=== Moineau ===
(René Moineau)

- Moineau C1
- Moineau pusher

=== Moinicken ===
(Chris Moinicken, Webster and Aberdeen, SD)

- Moinicken 1924 Biplane

=== Moiseenko ===
(V.L.Moiseenko)

- V.L.Moiseenko 2U-B3

=== Moisant ===
- Moisant L'Ecrevisse Monoplane

=== Moles & Kerr ===
(Howard R Moles & Jhn A Kerr, Kenmore, NY)

- Moles & Kerr 1931 Monoplane

=== Moller ===
((Paul) Moller Aircraft Co, Davis, CA)

- Moller M150 Skycar
- Moller M200 Neuera
- Moller M200X Skycar
- Moller M200G Volantor
- Moller M400 Skycar
- Moller M600 Skycar
- Moller XM-2
- Moller XM-3
- Moller XM-4

=== Möller ===
(Flugzeugbau Möller)

- Möller Stormarn
- Möller Stomo 1
- Möller Stomo 2
- Möller Stomo 3 (V-3 Temperolus, V-11 Stürmer)
- Möller Stromer

=== Mollo-Imoden ===
(Ernest Mollo & Emil Imoden, Napa, CA)

- Mollo-Imoden 1936 Biplane

=== Molniya ===
(NPO Molniya)

- Molniya-1
- Molniya-100
- Molniya-300
- Molniya-400
- Molniya-1000
- Molniya Heracles

=== Molteni ===
(Ernesto Molteni)

- Molteni monoplane

=== Molyneux ===
(G. C. Molyneaux, Melbourne, Australia)

- Molyneux XM-1000
- Molyneux XM2001

=== Monarch ===
(Monarch Aircraft Corp (founders: Frank Stahle & Arthur W Roza), 94 Ogden Ave, Riverside, IL)

- Monarch A
- Monarch Commercial a.k.a. Light Commercial

=== Monarch ===
(Monarch Aero Products, Cleveland, OH)

- Monarch F-130-2

=== Moncassin ===
- Moncassin single-engined flying boat
- Moncassin twin-engined flying boat

=== Mong ===
(Ralph E Mong, Tulsa OK.)

- Mong MS1 Sport
- Mong Mongster

=== Monnereau ===
(Gilbert Monnereau)

- Monnereau MG.01

=== Monnett ===
((John T) Monnett Experimental Aircraft Inc, Elgin, IL)

- Monnett Sonerai
- Monnett Sonerai II
- Monnett Sonerai II-L
- Monnett Sonerai II-LS
- Monnett Sonerai II-LST
- Monnett Sonerai II-LT
- Monnett Monex
- Monnett Moni
- Monnett Mini-Moni
- Monnett Mini

=== Mono ===
(Mono Aircraft Div (Pres: W L Velie), Allied Aviation Industries Inc)

- Mono Midget
- Mono Monocoach 201
- Mono Monocoach 225
- Mono Monocoupe 1
- Mono Monocoupe 70
- Mono Monocoupe 90
- Mono Monocoupe 110
- Mono Monocoupe 110 Special
- Mono Monocoupe 113
- Mono Monocoupe 113 Special
- Mono Monocoupe 125
- Mono Monocoupe 501
- Mono Monoprep 218
- Mono Monosport 1
- Mono Monosport 2

=== Monocoupe ===
(Monocoupe Corp/Lambert Engine & Machine Corp, Lambert Field, St Louis, MO)

- Monocoupe 70-V
- Monocoupe 90
- Monocoupe 100 Special
- Monocoupe 110
- Monocoupe 125
- Monocoupe D
- Monocoupe D-125
- Monocoupe D-145
- Monocoupe Meteor
- Monocoupe Monosport D
- Monocoupe Monosport G
- Monocoupe Monocoach H a.k.a. Zenith / Zephyr
- Universal L-7

=== Mono-Van ===
(Mono-Van Aircraft Inc (Pres: Eber H Van Valkenburg), 1202 Prospect Ave, Toledo and Fremont, OH)

- Mono-Van M-V-1
- Mono-Van M-2

=== Monsted-Vincent ===
((Robert) Monsted-(H Farley) Vincent, New Orleans, LA)

- MV-1 Starflight small passenger aircraft, four pusher engines

=== Montagne ===
(William Montagne, San Ramon, CA)

- Montagne Mach Buster

=== Montague ===
( (M L) Montague Monoplane Company, Kansas City, KS)

- Montague Monoplane

=== Montalva ===
- Montalva M.1 Montalva
- Montalva M.2 Trovão Azul

=== Montana ===
(Montana Coyote Inc, Helena, MT)

- Montana Coyote
- Montana Mountain Eagle

=== Monte-Copter ===
(Monte-Copter Inc (Fdr: Maurice L Ramme) Seattle, WA)

- Monte-Copter 10-A
- Monte-Copter 12
- Monte-Copter 15 Tri-phibian

=== Montee ===
( Montee Aircraft Co, Santa Monica, CA)

- Montee 1921 Monoplane
- Montee Dragonfly
- Montee MR-1
- Montee N-2
- Montee Special

=== Montgomerie Autogyros ===
- Montgomerie Bensen
- Montgomerie Merlin

=== Montgomery ===
(John J Montgomery, Santa Clara, CA)

- Montgomery Double Monoplane

=== Montijo ===
(John G Montijo, 2322 Elm St, Long Beach, CA)

- Montijo 1924 Biplane

=== Mooney ===
- Mooney A-1
- Mooney A-2
- Mooney M-5
- Mooney M-10
- Mooney M-16C
- Mooney M-17 (Culver V)
- Mooney M-18 Mite
- Mooney M-19
- Mooney M-20
- Mooney MT20
- Mooney M22
- Mooney M-30
- Mooney MU-2
- Mooney M20
- Mooney 201
- Mooney Cadet
- Mooney TX-1

=== Mooney Mite Aircraft Corporation ===
- Mooney Mite

=== Moragon ===
(Aeromoragon)

- Moragon Stela

=== Morane-Saulnier ===
(Léon Morane et Raymond Saulnier / Société Anonyme des Aéroplanes Morane-Saulnier / SEEMS – Société d'Exploitation des Etablissements Morane Saulnier / )

- Morane-Saulnier Torpille Blindée
- Morane-Saulnier 1912 Hydravion
- Morane-Saulnier A
- Morane-Saulnier AC
- Morane-Saulnier AE
- Morane-Saulnier AF
- Morane-Saulnier AFH
- Morane-Saulnier AI
- Morane-Saulnier AN
- Morane-Saulnier ANL
- Morane-Saulnier ANR
- Morane-Saulnier ANS
- Morane-Saulnier AR
- Morane-Saulnier AS
- Morane-Saulnier AV 1922 4-place parasol prototype
- Morane-Saulnier B
- Morane-Saulnier BB
- Morane-Saulnier BH
- Morane-Saulnier BI
- Morane-Saulnier C
- Morane-Saulnier F
- Morane-Saulnier G
- Morane-Saulnier GA
- Morane-Saulnier GB
- Morane-Saulnier G hydravion
- Morane-Saulnier H
- Morane-Saulnier I
- Morane-Saulnier K floatplane racer, monoplane
- Morane-Saulnier L
- Morane-Saulnier LA
- Morane-Saulnier M
- Morane-Saulnier N
- Morane-Saulnier O 1914 single seater, development of G prototype
- Morane-Saulnier P
- Morane-Saulnier PP (1911)
- Morane-Saulnier S
- Morane-Saulnier T
- Morane-Saulnier U
- Morane-Saulnier V
- Morane-Saulnier WB (confusion with Cyrillic script?)
- Morane-Saulnier WR
- Morane-Saulnier X
- Morane-Saulnier Y
- Morane-Saulnier TRK (MoS-9)
- Morane-Saulnier MoS-1 (C.1)
- Morane-Saulnier MoS-2 (G)
- Morane-Saulnier MoS-3 (L)
- Morane-Saulnier MoS-4 (LA)
- Morane-Saulnier MoS-5 (N)
- Morane-Saulnier MoS-5 C1
- Morane-Saulnier MoS-6 (I)
- Morane-Saulnier MoS-7 (BB)
- Morane-Saulnier MoS-8 (BH)
- Morane-Saulnier MoS-9 (TRK)
- Morane-Saulnier MoS-10 (S)
- Morane-Saulnier MoS-11 (R1/A)
- Morane-Saulnier MoS-12 (H)
- Morane-Saulnier MoS-13 (M)
- Morane-Saulnier MoS-14 (GB)
- Morane-Saulnier MoS-15 (GB)
- Morane-Saulnier MoS-16 (E.2 two seat trainer)
- Morane-Saulnier MoS-17 (G)
- Morane-Saulnier MoS-18 (G)
- Morane-Saulnier MoS-19 (GA).
- Morane-Saulnier MoS-23
- Morane-Saulnier MoS-25
- Morane-Saulnier MoS-27
- Morane-Saulnier MoS-28
- Morane-Saulnier MoS-29
- Morane-Saulnier MoS-30
- Morane-Saulnier MoS-35
- Morane-Saulnier MS.42
- Morane-Saulnier MoS-43
- Morane-Saulnier MoS-50
- Morane-Saulnier MoS-51
- Morane-Saulnier MoS-53
- Morane-Saulnier MoS-69
- Morane-Saulnier MoS-121
- Morane-Saulnier MoS-130
- Morane-Saulnier MoS-132
- Morane-Saulnier MoS-133
- Morane-Saulnier MoS-134
- Morane-Saulnier MoS-136
- Morane-Saulnier MoS-137
- Morane-Saulnier MoS-138
- Morane-Saulnier MoS-139
- Morane-Saulnier MS.140
- Morane-Saulnier MoS-147
- Morane-Saulnier MoS-148
- Morane-Saulnier MoS-149
- Morane-Saulnier MS.129
- Morane-Saulnier MS.152
- Morane-Saulnier MS.180
- Morane-Saulnier MS.181
- Morane-Saulnier MS.185
- Morane-Saulnier MS.191
- Morane-Saulnier MS.200
- Morane-Saulnier MS.221
- Morane-Saulnier MS.222
- Morane-Saulnier MS.223
- Morane-Saulnier MS.224
- Morane-Saulnier MS.225
- Morane-Saulnier MS.226
- Morane-Saulnier MS.227
- Morane-Saulnier MS.229
- Morane-Saulnier MS.230
- Morane-Saulnier MS.231
- Morane-Saulnier MS.232
- Morane-Saulnier MS.233
- Morane-Saulnier MS.234
- Morane-Saulnier MS.234/2
- Morane-Saulnier MS.234no2
- Morane-Saulnier MS.235
- Morane-Saulnier MS.236
- Morane-Saulnier MS.237
- Morane-Saulnier MS.260
- Morane-Saulnier MS.275
- Morane-Saulnier MS.278
- Morane-Saulnier MS.300
- Morane-Saulnier MS.301
- Morane-Saulnier MS.311
- Morane-Saulnier MS.315
- Morane-Saulnier MS.315/2
- Morane-Saulnier MS.316
- Morane-Saulnier MS.317
- Morane-Saulnier MS.325
- Morane-Saulnier MS.340
- Morane-Saulnier MS.341
- Morane-Saulnier MS.342
- Morane-Saulnier MS.343
- Morane-Saulnier MS.345
- Morane-Saulnier MS.350
- Morane-Saulnier MS.405
- Morane-Saulnier MS.406
- Morane-Saulnier MS.410
- Morane-Saulnier MS.430
- Morane-Saulnier MS.435
- Morane-Saulnier MS.450
- Morane-Saulnier MS.470 Vanneau
- Morane-Saulnier MS.471 Vanneau
- Morane-Saulnier MS.472 Vanneau
- Morane-Saulnier MS.473 Vanneau
- Morane-Saulnier MS.474 Vanneau
- Morane-Saulnier MS.475 Vanneau
- Morane-Saulnier MS.476 Vanneau
- Morane-Saulnier MS.477 Vanneau
- Morane-Saulnier MS.478 Vanneau
- Morane-Saulnier MS.479 Vanneau
- Morane-Saulnier MS.500 Criquet
- Morane-Saulnier MS.501
- Morane-Saulnier MS.502
- Morane-Saulnier MS.504
- Morane-Saulnier MS.505
- Morane-Saulnier MS.506
- Morane-Saulnier MS.540
- Morane-Saulnier MS.560
- Morane-Saulnier MS.561
- Morane-Saulnier MS.562
- Morane-Saulnier MS.563
- Morane-Saulnier MS.564
- Morane-Saulnier MS.570
- Morane-Saulnier MS.571
- Morane-Saulnier MS.572
- Morane-Saulnier MS.600
- Morane-Saulnier MS.602
- Morane-Saulnier MS.603
- Morane-Saulnier MS.660
- Morane-Saulnier MS.661
- Morane-Saulnier MS.700
- Morane-Saulnier MS.701
- Morane-Saulnier MS.703 Pétrel
- Morane-Saulnier MS.704
- Morane-Saulnier MS.730 Alcyon
- Morane-Saulnier MS.731 Alcyon
- Morane-Saulnier MS.732 Alcyon
- Morane-Saulnier MS.733 Alcyon
- Morane-Saulnier MS.733A Alcyon
- Morane-Saulnier MS.735 Alcyon
- Morane-Saulnier MS.755 Fleuret
- Morane-Saulnier MS.760 Paris
- Morane-Saulnier MS.880 Rallye
- Morane-Saulnier MS.880b Rallye
- Morane-Saulnier MS.885 Super Rallye
- Morane-Saulnier MS.886 Rallye
- Morane-Saulnier MS.890 Rallye Commodore
- Morane-Saulnier MS.893
- Morane-Saulnier MS.894 Rallye Commodore
- Morane-Saulnier MS.1500 Épervier

=== Moreau ===
(Albert Moreau)

- Moreau 1909 monoplane

=== Morava Zlin ===
- Morava (Russo) Savage

=== Moreau ===
(Jean Moreau)

- Moreau 10

=== Moreland ===
((G E) Moreland Aircraft Inc, Mines Field, El Segundo, CA)

- Moreland M-1
- Moreland MT-101
- Moreland S-3

=== Morgan ===
(Morgan Aircraft)

- Morgan Bushmaster II

=== Morin ===
(Pierre Morin)

- Morin PM.1

=== Morita ===
(Shinzo Morita)

- Morita 1911 Aeroplane

=== Mörkö ===
- Mörkö Moraani

=== Morris ===
(Kenneth G Morris)

- Morris KM-II Spare Parts

=== Morris ===
(Roy Morris Aircraft Co, Topeka, KS)

- Morris Dove

=== Morrisey ===
((William J) Morrisey Aircraft Co, Long Beach and Santa Ana, CA, 1959: (Clifford) Shinn Aircraft Co, Santa Ana, CA, c.1982: The Morrisey Co, San Luis Rey, CA, 1984: Morrisey Aircraft Co, Las Vegas, NV)

- Morrisey 1000C Nifty
- Morrisey 2000C
- Morrisey 2150
- Morrisey Bravo I Primary
- Morrisey Bravo II aka MO-1-2
- Morrisey OM-1

=== Morrison Aircraft ===
(Nambour, Queensland, Australia)

- Morrison 6

=== Morrissette ===
(Everett T Morrissette, Somers, CT)

- Morrissette Mosquito

=== Morrow ===
((Howard B) Morrow Aircraft Corp, San Bernardino, CA)

- Morrow 1-L Victory Trainer

=== Morse ===
(Allen Morse, 3337 Pincrest Rd, Indianapolis, IN)

- Morse Comet
- Morse 1935 Biplane

=== Mortensen/Rutan ===
(Dan Mortensen – builder / Burt rutan – designer)

- Mortensen/Rutan Racer

=== Morton ===
(Morton Brothers Airplanes, Omaha and McCook, NE)

- Morton Nightingale

=== Moryson ===
(Josef Moryson or Morison / Morrison)

- Moryson Ostrovia I
- Moryson Ostrovia II
- Moryson III
- Moryson IV

=== Morton ===
(Aviation Industries Inc, Omaha, NE)

- Morton f.s.b.

=== Moser ===
- Moser helicopter

=== Mosca-Bystritsky ===
(Francesca E. Mosca & Bystritsky)

- Mosca-Bystritsky MB
- Mosca-Bystritsky MB Encore
- Mosca-Bystritsky MBbis

=== Moshier ===
(Moshier Technologies)

- Moshier Aurora 400A

=== Moskalyev ===
- Moskalyev RM-1
- Moskalyev MU-3
- Moskalyev SAM-1
- Moskalyev SAM-2
- Moskalyev SAM-3
- Moskalyev SAM-4
- Moskalyev SAM-5
- Moskalyev SAM-6
- Moskalyev SAM-7 Sigma
- Moskalyev SAM-9 Strela
- Moskalyev SAM-10
- Moskalyev SAM-11
- Moskalyev SAM-11bis
- Moskalyev SAM-12
- Moskalyev SAM-13
- Moskalyev SAM-14
- Moskalyev SAM-16
- Moskalyev SAM-18bis
- Moskalyev SAM-19
- Moskalyev SAM-22
- Moskalyev SAM-23
- Moskalyev SAM-24
- Moskalyev SAM-25
- Moskalyev SAM-26
- Moskalyev SAM-28
- Moskalyev SAM-29

=== Mosler ===
(Mosler Motors Inc, Hendersonville NC.)

- Mosler N3 Pup
- Mosler N3-2

=== Mosquito ===
(Mosquito Aviation)

- Mosquito Aviation XE
- Mosquito Aviation AIR
- Mosquito Aviation XEL
- Mosquito Aviation XE3
- Mosquito Aviation XET

=== Moth ===
(Moth Aircraft Corp, Lowell, MA) (N.B. not related to American Moth)

- Moth 60-GM
- Moth 60-GMW
- Moth 60-X

=== Motor Products ===
(designer William B Stout)

- Motor Products SX-6

=== Moundsville ===
(Moundsville Airplane Corp, Moundsville, WV)

- Moundsville Lone Eagle X2LC

=== Mountaineer ===
(Christopher Morgan, New York, NY)

- Mountaineer 1912 Biplane

=== Mountaineer Trikes ===
- Mountaineer Trikes Mite-Lite
- Mountaineer Trikes Dual 175
- Mountaineer Trikes Solo 175

=== Moscow Technical School ===
- ITU 1911 monoplane (A.N. Tupolev, B.N. Yuryev and A.A. Komarov)
- Lobanov L-1 Ptenets (fledgeling) (Nikolai Rodionovich Lobanov)
- Dukhovetskii D-1 Liliput (A.V. Dukhovetskii)
- Dukhovetskii D-2 Malyi Muromets

=== Mosscraft ===
(Moss Brothers Aircraft)

- Mosscraft M.A.1
- Mosscraft M.A.2

=== Moura ===
(Mauricio Impelizieri P.Moura)

- MIM Esqualo-180 (Shark)

=== Mourlot ===
- Mourlot X-28

=== Moyer ===
(Jarrett G Moyer, Syracuse and Skaneateles, NY)

- Moyer 1928 Monoplane

=== Moyes Delta Gliders ===
(Botany and later Kurnell, New South Wales, Australia)

- Moyes CXS
- Moyes GTR
- Moyes Litespeed
- Moyes Litesport
- Moyes Malibu
- Moyes Max
- Moyes Mega
- Moyes Mission
- Moyes Sonic
- Moyes Ventura
- Moyes X2
- Moyes XL
- Moyes XS
- Moyes XT
- Moyes Xtralite

=== Moyes Microlights ===
- Moyes Connie
- Moyes Dragonfly
- Moyes Dragonfly C
- Moyes Tempest

=== Moynet ===
- Moynet M-360 Jupiter

=== Mozhaiski ===
- Mozhaiski Monoplane

=== MP ===
(Moto-Plane Aviation Inc.)

- MP Moto-Plane

=== MPC Aircraft ===
(c/o Airbus, Kreetslag 10, 21129 Hamburg, Germany)

- MPC 75 (DAA92/122, Regioliner R92/122, FASA)

=== Mráz ===
- Mráz K-65 Čáp
- Mráz M.1 Sokol
- Mráz M-2 Skaut
- Mráz M-4

=== MSL Aero ===
(Limoges-Fourches, France)

- MSL Aero H80
- MSL Aero H100
- MSL Aero H2O
- MSL Aero Type H

=== MS Parafly ===
(Meßstetten, Germany)

- MS Parafly Skyward

=== MSrE ===
(Műegyetemi Sportrepülő Egyesület – BME Sportrepülő Association)

- MSrE L.1 Mama Kedvence – (Mummy's Darling)
- MSrE L.2 Róma (Rome)
- MSrE L.4 Bohóc (Clown)
- MSrE BL.5 – Bánhidi & Lampich
- MSrE BL.6 – Bánhidi & Lampich
- MSrE BL.7 Holló (Crow) (Rebuilt BL-5)
- MSrE L.9
- MSrE L.9-II
- MSrE BL.16 – Bánhidi & Lampich
- MSrE M-19 (Rubik R-02) – Ernõ RUBIK
- MSrE M-20 (Rubik R-01) – Ernõ RUBIK and Endre JANCSÓ – MSrE
- MSrE M-21 Harag (Hungarian: "Fury") – Szegedy
- MSrE M-22 – András Szokolay & Endre Jancso – MSrE / Aero Ever Ltd., Aircraft Factory of Transylvania
- MSrE M-24 – Jancsó and Szegedy
- MSrE M-25 Nebuló (Urchin) – Jancsó
- MSrE M-27
- MSrE M-28 Daru (Crane)
- MSrE EM-29 Csóka (Jackdaw) – Jancsó and Szegedy
- MSrE M-30 Fergeteg
- Gerle 11 (Dove)
- Gerle 12
- Gerle 13
- Gerle 14
- Gerle 15
- Gerle 16
- Gerle 17
- Gerle 18
- EMESE-B – Rubik and Jancsó
- EMESE-C – re-designed by Tasnádi
- EMESE EM-27
- EMESE EM-29

=== MSW Aviation ===
- MSW Votec 221
- MSW Votec 232
- MSW Votec 252SBS
- MSW Votec 252T
- MSW Votec 322
- MSW Votec 351
- MSW Votec 352T
- MSW Votec 452T

=== MTC ===
(MTC Technologies)

- MTC MQ-17 SpyHawk

=== Mudry ===
(Avions Mudry Cie / Auguste Mudry)

- Mudry CAP 1
- Mudry CAP 10
- Mudry CAP 20
- Mudry CAP 20LS-180
- Mudry CAP 20LS-200
- Mudry CAP 21
- Mudry CAP-X
- Mudry CAP-X Super
- Mudry CAP-X4
- CAP 230
- CAP 231
- CAP 232

=== Mueller ===
- Mueller Safti-Copter

=== Muessig ===
(O G Muessig, OR.)

- Muessig P-2

=== Mukai ===
(Isao Mukai)

- Mukai Olive SMG III

=== Muller ===
(Charles E Muller)

- Muller 1920 Biplane

=== Müller ===
(Gebrüder Müller, of Griesheim)

- Müller G.M.G. I
- Müller G.M.G. II

=== Mulot ===
- Mulot AM.220

=== Mulot ===
- Mulot AM.20 Sport
- Mulot 1925 monoplane
- Mulot Labor

=== Multiplane ===
(Multiplane Aircraft Corp (Waterbury Button Co), 835 S Main St, Waterbury, CT)

- Multiplane 1929 aeroplane

=== Mummert ===
(Harvey C Mummert, Long Island, NY)

- Mummert Cootie a.k.a. Baby Vamp
- Mummert Baby Vamp a.k.a. Cootie
- Mummert Mini-plane
- Mummert Red Racer
- Mummert V-2 Sport Plane a.k.a. Sport

=== Muniz ===
(Cia. Nacional Navigaceo Costiera / Fabrica Brasiliera de Aviŏes' / Capitão Antônio Guedes Muniz)

- Muniz Casmuniz 52
- Muniz M-1 unbuilt design
- Muniz M-3 unbuilt design
- Muniz M-5 one built in France exported to Brazil
- Muniz M-6
- Muniz M-7
- Muniz M-8
- Muniz M-9
- Muniz M-11

=== Munsell ===
(Charles W Munsell, Kenosha, WI)

- Munsell 1927 Biplane

=== Munson ===
(Raymond Munson, Milwaukee, WI)

- Munson A-1

=== Murchio ===
(Murchio Flying Service, Paterson, NJ)

- Murchio M-1
- Murchio M-2
- Murchio M-3
- Murchio M-4
- Murchio M-5

=== Mureaux ===
see ANF Les Mureaux

=== Murphy ===
(Mike Murphy, Kokomo, IN)

- Murphy A-1 Over-and-Under

=== Murphy ===
(Cleve Stoskopf, Rancho Palos Verdes, CA)

- Murphy Mouse

=== Murphy ===
(Dick Murphy)

- Murphy VM-7 Competitor

=== Murphy ===
- Murphy Elite
- Murphy Maverick
- Murphy Moose
- Murphy Bull Moose
- Murphy Rebel
- Murphy Renegade
- Murphy Renegade Spirit
- Murphy Yukon
- Murphy JDM-8
- Murphy SR2500 Super Rebel
- Murphy SR3500 Super Rebel

=== Murray ===
(William Roland Murray, 1149 Allen Ave, Glendale, CA)

- Murray M-7

=== Murray ===
(Frank A Murray, Rockford, IL)

- Murray 1940 Monoplane
- Murray JN2-D1 Jenette

=== Murray ===
(W Roland Murray)

- Murray ML-60F Flivair

=== Murray-Carns ===
(J. W. Murray Co., Detroit, Michigan / Joseph Carnes?)

- Murray-Carns All Steel biplane

=== Murray-Womack ===
((Durard) Murray & (Fritz) Womack, Iola, KS)

- Murray-Womack Sport

=== Murrayair ===
- Murrayair MA-1

=== Musger ===
(Edwin Musger)

- Musger Mg 3

=== Muşicǎ ===
(Grigore Muşicǎ)

- Muşicǎ G.M.-1

=== Musick-Reynolds ===
(Edwin C Musick & Harry Reynolds, Santa Monica, CA)

- Musick-Reynolds 1911 Biplane

=== Mustang ===
(Mustang Aeronautics (Pres: Chris Tieman), Troy, MI)

- Mustang Aeronautics Midget Mustang
- Mustang Aeronautics Mustang II

=== Mutual ===
(Mutual Aircraft Service/Aircraft Co (Pres: A H Feffle), Kansas City, MO and Norwalk, CT)

- Mutual Blackbird

=== MVEN ===
- MVEN Farmer-2

=== MVP ===
(MVP – Most Versatile Plane)

- MVP Model 3

=== MWZ ===
(MWZ Aircraft Co, Chicago, IL)

- MWZ W-LB-50

=== MX Aircraft ===
- MX Aircraft MX2
- MX Aircraft MXS
- MX Aircraft MXR

=== Myasishchev ===
==== 1940-1960 ====
- Myasishchev DVB-102
- Myasishchev DB-108
- Myasishchev DB-II-108
- Myasishchev VB-109
- Myasishchev DIS
- Myasishchev SDB
- Myasishchev DVB-202
- Myasishchev DVB-302
- Myasishchev DVB-402
- Myasishchev M
- Myasishchev 2M military designation for M-4
- Myasishchev 3M
- Myasishchev M-4 four-engine strategic bomber
- Myasishchev M-25 company designation for M-4
- Myasishchev M-26 M-4 with VD-7 engines
- Myasishchev M-27 projected two- or four-engine jetliner
- Myasishchev M-28 four-engine, high-altitude bomber
- Myasishchev M-29 projected airliner derivative of M-4
- Myasishchev M-30 projected high-altitude reconnaissance aircraft
- Myasishchev M-31 projected transonic strategic bomber
- Myasishchev M-32 projected delta-wing supersonic strategic bomber
- Myasishchev M-33 Yak-1000 development
- Myasishchev M-34 transonic bomber
- Myasishchev M-35 in-flight refueling system for M-4 and 3M
- Myasishchev M-36 company designation for 3M
- Myasishchev M-39 3M powered by VD-7V turbojets
- Myasishchev M-40 'Buran' strategic missile system
- Myasishchev M-49 spaceplane project
- Myasishchev M-50 prototype supersonic bomber
- Myasishchev M-51 unmanned M-50
- Myasishchev M-52 (1956) prototype supersonic strategic missile carrier developed from the M-50
- Myasishchev M-53 projected SST
- Myasishchev M-54 tailless, delta-wing supersonic heavy bomber project
- Myasishchev M-55 SST designs
- Myasishchev M-56 canard or delta supersonic strategic missile carrier; similar to XB-70
- Myasishchev M-57 nuclear-powered bomber project
- Myasishchev M-58 tailless supersonic bomber
- Myasishchev M-59 canard-wing supersonic missile carrier
- Myasishchev M-60 projected nuclear-powered bomber developed from the M-50
- Myasishchev M-70 supersonic flying boat
- VM-1 prototype long-range, high-altitude bomber
- VM-6 Pe-2 with M-1 engines
- VM-7
- VM-9
- VM-10
- VM-11
- VM-12
- VM-13
- VM-14 prototype long-range escort fighter
- VM-15
- VM-16 prototype long-range bomber developed from the Pe-2
- VM-17 prototype three-crew version of DB-108
- VM-18 prototype four-crew version of VM-16 with increased wingspan and lengthened fuselage
- VM-19 VM-16 rebuilt for two crew and same wingspan as VM-16 and VM-17
- VM-20
- VM-21
- VM-22 four-engine, long-range high-altitude bomber project
- VM-23 four-engine, long-range high-altitude bomber project; DVB-202 development
- VM-24 projected tactical jet bomber; also known as DSB-17
- Myasishchev Product 103

==== 1967-present ====
- Myasishchev M-12 STOL/VTOL utility aircraft
- Myasishchev M-13 military transport
- Myasishchev M-17 'Stratosphera', high-altitude reconnaissance aircraft
- Myasishchev M-18 supersonic bomber design; cancelled in favor of the Tu-160
- Myasishchev M-19 hypersonic air and space plane designs
- Myasishchev M-20 strategic multi-regime supersonic bomber designs
- Myasishchev M-25 supersonic attack aircraft; used its own shockwave as a weapon
- Myasishchev M-35 two M-4s converted to Buran shuttle carrier aircraft
- Myasishchev M-52 (1979) eight-engine heavy transport aircraft project
- Myasishchev M-55 'Geofizika', high-altitude reconnaissance/research aircraft
- Myasishchev M-60 widebody airliner designs
- Myasishchev M-61 development of M-17
- Myasishchev M-62 Oryol, high-altitude remote-controlled drone
- Myasishchev M-63 high-altitude aircraft
- Myasishchev M-65 M-17 development
- Myasishchev M-67 high-altitude observation aircraft, 1987
- Myasishchev M-70 Gzhel, single-engine business/executive transport aircraft; renamed to M-101
- Myasishchev M-72 Yamal twin-engine amphibious aircraft
- Myasishchev M-80 two or four-engine VTOL transport aircraft
- Myasishchev M-90 very heavy multi-purpose transport project
- Myasishchev M-101T
- Myasishchev M-102
- Myasishchev M-103 Skif
- Myasishchev M-104 project
- Myasishchev M-105 twin-engine business/executive transport aircraft developed from the M-102, 1994
- Myasishchev M-111 twin-engine business/executive transport project, revision of 1975 German AMC-111 project, 1993
- Myasishchev M-112 twin-engine business/executive transport aircraft, German-Russian joint project, 1993
- Myasishchev M-120 twin-engine business/executive transport aircraft
- Myasishchev M-121 twin-engine business/executive transport aircraft
- Myasishchev M-150 twin-engine, 150 passenger short-range airliner
- Myasishchev M-200 'Master', military advanced trainer project
- Myasishchev M-201 Sokol, twin-engine business/executive transport aircraft
- Myasishchev M-202 Olyon, 19 passenger twin-engine feederliner developed from the M-102
- Myasishchev M-203 Barsuk, single-engine light utility aircraft
- Myasishchev M-205 two-seat light attack aircraft
- Myasishchev M-207 advanced trainer developed from the M-205
- Myasishchev M-302 Kuryer, twin-engine business/executive transport aircraft for Iran
- Myasishchev M-500 agricultural utility aircraft
- Myasishchev Subject 34
- Myasishchev VM-T 'Atlant'

=== Myers ===
(Myers Flying Service, Paterson, NJ)

- Myers Annular
- Myers Helicopter
- Myers Helicopter 2

=== Myers ===
(Lloyd W Myers, St Petersburg, FL)

- Myers 2

=== Myers ===
(Howard H "Pete" Myers, Lawn, IL)

- Myers M-1
- Myers M-2

=== Mylius ===
(Mylius Flugzeugwerk GmbH & Co KG – Albert Mylius)

- Mylius My-102 Tornado
- Mylius My-103 Mistral
- Mylius My-103/180
- Mylius My-103/200
- Mylius My-104

=== MySky Aircraft ===
(Port Orange, FL)

- MySky MS One
