= H80 =

H80 or H-80 can refer to:

- MSL Aero H80, a French ultralight aircraft
- General Electric H80, a turboprop aircraft engine
- HMS Brazen (H80), a B-class destroyer built for the Royal Navy circa 1930
