= MT-Propeller =

German aircraft propeller manufacturer

- Industry: Aerospace
- Founded: 1980
- Founder: Gerd Muehlbauer
- Headquarters: Straubing Wallmuhle Airport, Bavaria, Germany
- Products: Aircraft propellers
- Website: www.mt-propeller.com

MT-Propeller Entwicklung GmbH, founded in 1980 by Gerd Muehlbauer, is a manufacturer of composite propellers for single and twin engine aircraft, airships, wind tunnels and other special applications.

The company headquarters is located at Straubing Wallmuhle Airport in Bavaria, Germany.

== History ==
In 2010 the company developed a special propeller design for restorations of the North American F-82 Twin Mustang.

== Applications ==
=== Factory installed ===
- Aquila A 210
- Beriev Be-103
- Cessna 172 JT-A
- Diamond DA40
- Diamond DA42
- Extra EA-300
- Fly-Fan Shark
- Franklin Demon-1
- Grob Strato 2C
- MSW Votec 221
- MSW Votec 252T
- MSW Votec 322
- MSW Votec 351
- MSW Votec 352T
- MSW Votec 452T
- NAL Saras
- Papa 51 Thunder Mustang
- Pitts Model 12
- Tecnam P2006T
- Tecnam P-Mentor

=== Installed under an STC ===
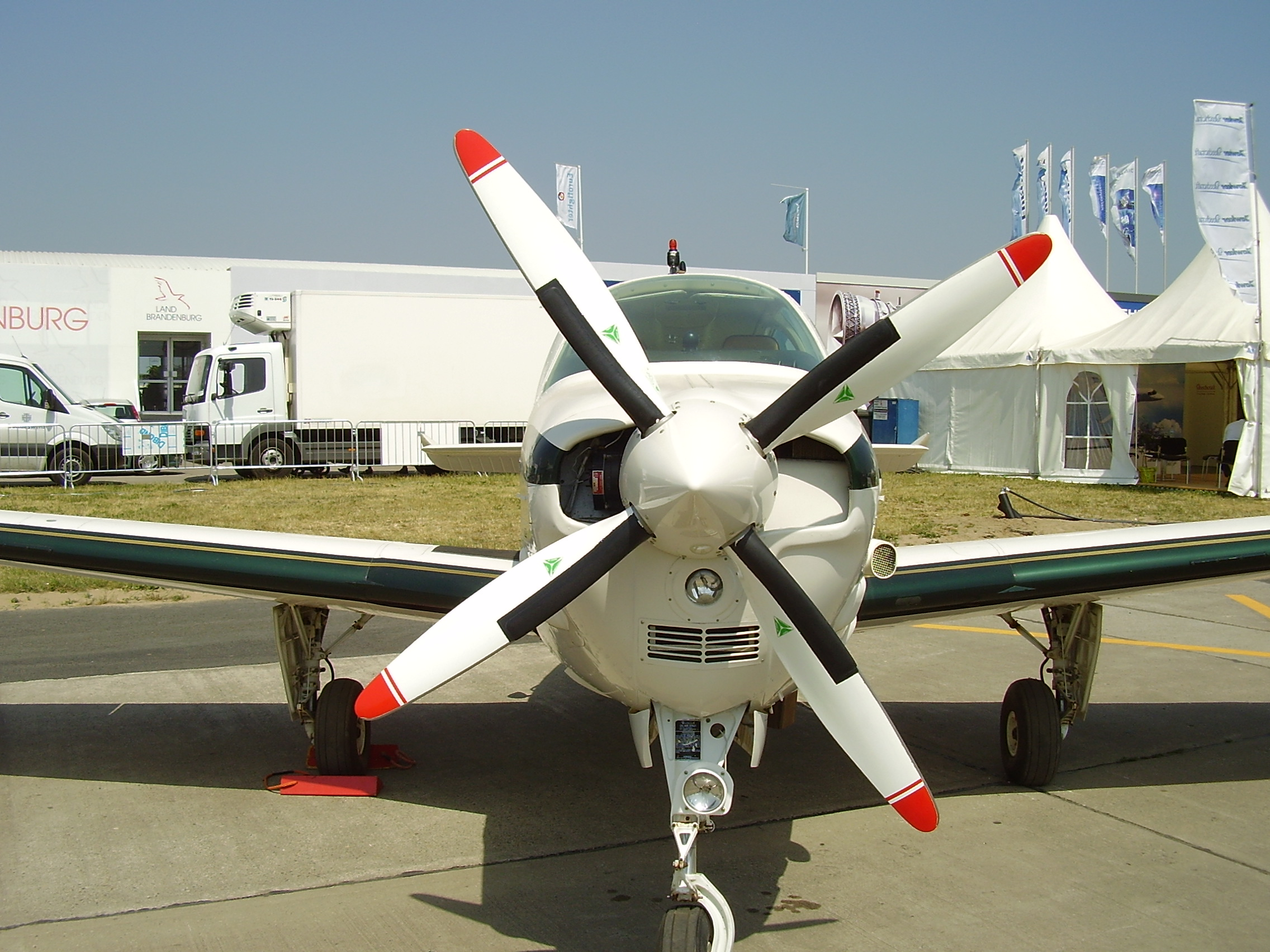
Beechcraft Bonanza fitted with an MT propeller

- Aviat Husky
- Beechcraft King Air
- Cessna 170
- Cessna 172
- Cessna 175
- Cirrus SR20
- Cirrus SR22
- Dornier 228
- Grumman American AA-5
- Lake Buccaneer
- PAC P-750 XSTOL
- Piper PA-46-350 Mirage Malibu
- Pitts Special
- Short SC.7 Skyvan

=== Installed on unmanned combat aerial vehicle (UCAV) ===
- Bayraktar TB2

== See also ==
- List of aircraft propeller manufacturers
