= XM3 =

XM3 may refer to:

- XM-3 Rhythm, a satellite operated by XM satellite radio
- XM 3, a radio channel from Sirus XM satellite radio; see List of Sirius XM Radio channels
- Renault Samsung XM3, a South Korean automobile
- Citroën XM 3.0, a French automobile
- South African type XM3 tender, a steam locomotive tender
- Moller XM-3, a VTOL aircraft; see List of aircraft (Mo)
- XM3, a prototype version of the Bradley Fighting Vehicle
- XM-3, a U.S. Army Vietnam War era sensor

== See also ==
- XME (disambiguation)
- XM (disambiguation)
