= Antal Bánhidi =

Hungarian aviator

Bánhidi Antal
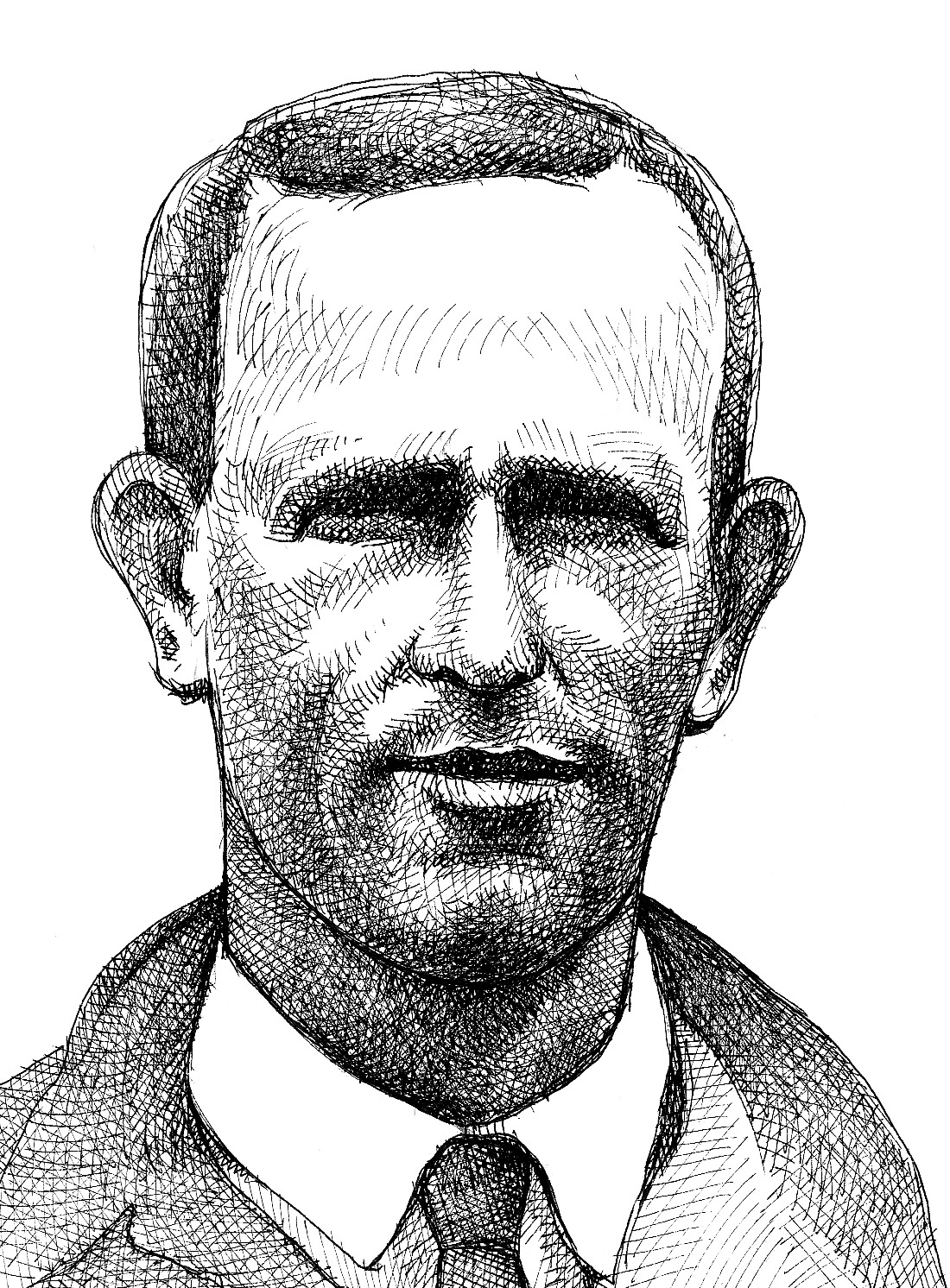
- Born: Antal Bánhidi; 23 December 1903; Szatmárnémeti, Austria-Hungary
- Died: 18 March 1994 (aged 90); Budapest, Hungary

Antal Bánhidi (23 December 1903 – 18 March 1994) was a Hungarian aviator.

Antal Bánhidi was born in Szatmárnémeti, then part of the Austro-Hungarian Empire. In 1920, he fled Romania by swimming across the Szamos river, and arrived in Hungary. He attended the Technical University of Budapest, where he assisted in establishing EMESE, the university's flight club. His piloting and engineering talent were recognized and Árpád Lampich taught him how to design airplanes.

In 1929, Bánhidi flew a Lampich L-2 Róma ultralight plane on a 5,000 kilometer journey to Sweden and back for the annual world meeting of university aviators. The flight included 150 km legs over sea, the plane's 18 hp (13 kW) 3-cylinder radial engine lacking the usual redundant set of spark magnets.

In 1930, Antal Bánhidi designed the Bánhidi Gerle, a light, universal, two-seater biplane, which was powered by a 100 hp (70 kW) 5-cylinder Genet-Major radial engine. The plane was suitable for flight schools, light aerobatics, air touring and sailplane towing. About 15 Gerle aircraft were built in Hungary before the outbreak of World War II.

In 1931, Bánhidi was hired as Chief Technical Advisor for the successful USA - Hungary transatlantic flight of György Endresz and Sándor Magyar. He chose and prepared a modern Lockheed Sirius 8A plane named "Justice for Hungary" for the voyage.

During February and March 1933, Bánhidi and floatplane pilot Tibor Bisits became the first aviators to complete a roundtrip along the Mediterranean Sea. Flying "Gerle No. 13", it took 100.5 hours of flight time to complete the 12,500 kilometer journey. Due to sour economic effects of the Great Depression, the expedition was only made possible by the offer of free fuel from Shell and the hospitality of Italians in North Africa. Bánhidi's Gerle was filmed by famous desert aviator László Almásy while circling the Great Pyramids without permission. On his return, Bánhidi wrote and published a book to document the journey.

In the autumn of 1933, Bánhidi made a one-man flight in "Gerle No. 13" from Debrecen to Finland, Sweden and London, aiming to set a touring record while taking advantage of an offer to have the plane's Genet-Major engine overhauled for free in Coventry. He was able to courier a state medal to Lord Rothermere, a sponsor of the 1931 ocean flight, and then flew to Debrecen non-stop. In 1937 Antal Bánhidi was invited for a two-month South American expedition, where he flew 15,000 kilometers over uncharted Amazonas territory, documented in another book.

On June 26, 1941, Antal Bánhidi, serving as a national guard reservist pilot at the time, became one of the few eyewitnesses to the mysterious bombing of Kassa. His Fiat CR-42 biplane fighter was too slow to intercept enemy medium bombers, and he was unable to conclusively identify the three attackers from the distance of one kilometer. Blame for the aerial bombing attack was laid on the Soviet Union, and the next day Hungary joined Nazi Germany.

After World War II, the USSR banned Hungary from building powered aircraft, thus the ageing Antal Bánhidi was put aside, working for decades as a blueprints' corrector for ground vehicle designs. After the fall of communism, he was recognized and honored for his achievements by the Hungarian government.
