= XME =

XME may refer to:

- Median language (ISO 639 language code: xme)
- Australian airExpress (ICAO airline code: XME)
- Maubeuge Aerodrome (IATA airport code: XME), Departement Nord, France; see List of airports in France
- Marble Mountain Ski Resort meteorological station (Environment Canada station code XME), Mount Musgrave, Steady Brook, Long Range Mountains, Newfoundland Island, Newfoundland and Labrador, Canada
- XME, the region code for Malaysia on the Samsung Galaxy brand device CSC list

== See also ==
- XM3 (disambiguation)
- Tenth (disambiguation) (French: X^{me} / 10^{ieme}, lit. '10th')
