= Morane-Saulnier AF =

French WW1 fighter aircraft

Type AF

General information
- Type: Biplane fighter
- National origin: France
- Manufacturer: Morane-Saulnier
- Number built: 1

History
- First flight: 23 June 1917
- Developed from: Morane-Saulnier AC
- Variant: Morane-Saulnier AI

The Morane-Saulnier AF, also known as the Morane-Saulnier Type AF and the MoS 28, was a French First World War single-seat biplane fighter prototype from 1917.

== Development ==
Although the fuselage was similar to that of the contemporary Morane-Saulnier Type AI parasol monoplane and preceding Morane-Saulnier AC shoulder wing monoplane, this aircraft was designed as a biplane. It was Morane-Saulnier's first single-seat fighter biplane as the company normally specialized in monoplanes. The AF was first flown on 23 June 1917 and tested by the Aviation Militaire in late 1917 however it was passed over for production in favour of the SPAD XIII, Morane-Saulnier Type AI and Nieuport 28. In November 1917 a floatplane version of the AF was flight tested with a single central pontoon-like float, but was not adopted.

== Variants ==
- Morane-Saulnier AC - shoulder wing fighter
- Morane-Saulnier AI - parasol wing fighter
- Morane-Saulnier AF - biplane fighter
- Morane-Saulnier AFH - floatplane version of biplane fighter

== Specifications (AF) ==
Data from War Planes of the First World War: Volume Five Fighters

General characteristics

- Crew: 1
- Length: 5.15 m (16 ft 11 in)
- Wingspan: 7.47 m (24 ft 6 in)
- Height: 2.35 m (7 ft 8.5 in)
- Wing area: 15.31 m^{2} (164.8 sq ft)
- Empty weight: 421 kg (928 lb)
- Gross weight: 649 kg (1,431 lb)
- Powerplant: 1 × Gnome Monosoupape 9Nb rotary engine , 112 kW (150 hp)

Performance

- Maximum speed: 207 km/h (129 mph, 112 kn)
- Rate of climb: 8.3 m/s (1,640 ft/min)

Armament

- 1 x 7.7 mm (0.303 in) Vickers gun

== Bibliography ==
- Bruce, J.M. (1972). War Planes of the First World War: Volume Five Fighters. London: Macdonald. ISBN 0-356-03779-7.
- Davilla, Dr. James J.; Soltan, Arthur (1997). French Aircraft of the First World War. Mountain View, CA: Flying Machines Press. ISBN 978-1891268090.
- Green, William; Gordon Swanborough. The Complete Book of Fighters. Godalming, UK: Salamander Books. p. 415.
