= Bánhidi Gerle =

Gerle
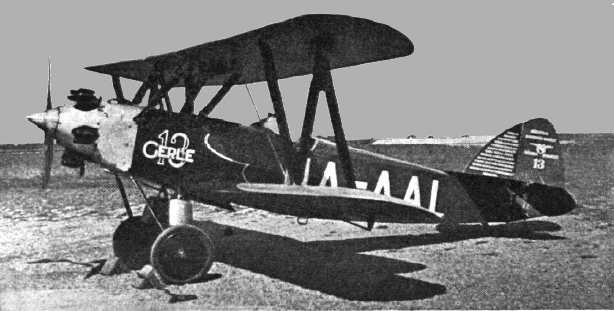
- Bánhidy Gerle 13 (HA-AAL), Hamble, September 1933

General information
- Type: Sport aircraft
- National origin: Hungary
- Manufacturer: Műegyetemi Sportrepülő Egyesület, WNF
- Designer: Antal Bánhidi
- Number built: ca. 10

History
- First flight: 4 September 1930

The Bánhidi Gerle (Hungarian: "Dove") was a two-seat, single-engine sport biplane built in Hungary in the early 1930s, designed by Antal Bánhidi.

== Design and development ==
The aircraft had a conventional layout, with staggered, single-bay wings of equal span braced by N-struts. The pilot and passenger sat in open cockpits in tandem, and the main units of the tailskid undercarriage were divided. The fuselage was constructed of fabric-covered steel tube, while the wings were built of plywood ribs and spruce spars and also covered in fabric. Bánhidi flew a single prototype (the Gerle 11 on 4 September 1930. This was followed by examples (designated Gerle 12 to Gerle 15) built by Műegyetemi Sportrepülő Egyesület, the sport flying club at the Budapest Technical University, and by another three machines (Gerle 16 to Gerle 18) built by WNF in Wiener Neustadt. The Gerles built by Műegyetemi Sportrepülő Egyesület are sometimes known under the name MSrE Gerle or MSE Gerle.

Bánhidi achieved fame with the Gerle 13 when in 1933 he made a long-distance flight of 12,258 km around the Mediterranean. Between 19 February and 24 March, he and Tibor Bisits visited twenty-two cities in Italy, France, Spain, North Africa, Egypt, Palestine, Turkey, and Greece, spending around 100 hours in the air. Later the same year, Bánhidi made a flight from Hungary through northern Europe to England and back to Hungary, his route taking him from Debrecen to Rapla, Helsinki, Stockholm, Copenhagen, Croydon, and then non-stop back to Debrecen. This final leg of the flight covered 1,640 km, a considerable achievement in a light aircraft at the time.

== Replicas ==
A flying replica of the Gerle 13 was built in 1988.

A flying replica of the Gerle 12, HA-AAE, has been built at Budaörs Airport, Budapest, by Goldtimer Aviation. The first test flight took place, successfully, on December 4. 2015.

== Variants ==
- Gerle 11 – prototype (1 built)
- Gerle 12 – version with Thorotzkay engine, later changed to Manfred Weiss Sp III (1 built by MSrE)
- Gerle 13 – version with Armstrong Siddeley Genet Major engine (1 built by MSrE)
- Gerle 14 – version with Manfred Weiss Soport 1 engine (2-3 built by MSrE)
- Gerle 15 – version with Armstrong Siddeley Genet Major engine (1 built by MSrE)
- Gerle 16 – single-seat version with Armstrong Siddeley Genet engine (1 built by WNF)
- Gerle 17 – (1 built by WNF)
- Gerle 18 – version with Siemens Sh 14 engine (1 built by WNF)

== Specifications (Gerle 13) ==

General characteristics

- Crew: One pilot
- Capacity: 1 passenger
- Empty weight: 460 kg (1,010 lb)
- Gross weight: 920 kg (2,020 lb)
- Powerplant: 1 × Armstrong Siddeley Genet Major , 75 kW (100 hp)

Performance

- Maximum speed: 185 km/h (115 mph, 100 kn)
- Endurance: 3 hours 30 minutes
