= Morane-Saulnier AS =

Type AS

General information
- Type: Tourer
- National origin: France
- Manufacturer: Morane-Saulnier

History
- First flight: 1920

The Morane-Saulnier AS was a high-wing monoplane single-seat touring aircraft built in France after WWI.

== Specifications (variant specified) ==
Data from

General characteristics

- Length: 5.64 m (18 ft 6 in)
- Wingspan: 8.8 m (28 ft 10 in)
- Height: 3.15 m (10 ft 4 in)
- Wing area: 13 m^{2} (140 sq ft)
- Gross weight: 350 kg (772 lb)
- Powerplant: 1 × Le Rhône 9C 9-cylinder air-cooled rotary piston engine, 60 kW (80 hp)

Performance

- Maximum speed: 165 km/h (103 mph, 89 kn)
