= MMPL Kanpur =

Kanpur

General information
- Type: Four-seat general-purpose light aircraft
- National origin: India
- Manufacturer: Maintenance Command Development Centre, Kanpur
- Designer: Harjandar Singh

History
- First flight: October 1961 (Kanpur II)

The MMPL Kanpur was an Indian light four-seat aircraft, designed for service and agricultural work in the early 1960s. It is a rare example of an aircraft designed and built by a national air force for its own use.

== Design and development ==
The Kanpur I was designed by an Indian Air Vice-Marshal and built in 132 days at the Indian Air Force Maintenance Command Development Centre at their Kanpur air base. A more powerful version, the Kanpur II, was intended for production as a military general-purpose and army observation machine, though serious consideration was also given to an agricultural role. For this, the prototype Kanpur I was fitted with spray bars. The Kanpur I dates from about 1960 and the Kanpur II first flew in October 1961.

The four-seat Kanpur was a conventional single-engine, braced high-wing monoplane with a fixed conventional undercarriage. It had a steel structure, mostly fabric-covered. The constant chord wings were built around two spars and with 1° 26' of dihedral. They were braced on each side with a pair of V-struts from the two spars to the lower fuselage longerons. Metal-skinned split flaps and fixed leading edge slots were fitted.

The fully glazed cabin was under the wing, with the four occupants in two rows of side-by-side seats. The Kanpur pilot had standard blind flying instrumentation and a STR-9X radio. The air-cooled engine, a flat four in the Kanpur I and a flat six in the Kanpur II, drove a two-blade propeller. The Kanpur's main wheels were mounted on cantilever, faired legs attached to the lower fuselage through liquid shock absorbers. There was a small tailwheel at the extreme tail, where the tailplane was placed on the upper fuselage. The elevator had a cut-out for the rounded rudder which extended to the keel, hung on a fin smoothly merged into the upper fuselage.

== Variants ==
Kanpur I: Prototype, with a four-cylinder, 142 kW (190 hp) Lycoming air-cooled horizontally opposed engine.

Kanpur II: Intended for production with a six-cylinder, 186 kW (250 hp) Lycoming air-cooled horizontally opposed engine. It was 250 mm (9.8 in) longer, a little heavier on take-off and had a maximum speed 39 km/h (24 mph) greater.

== Specifications (Kanpur II) ==
Data from Jane's All the World's Aircraft 1962/3

General characteristics

- Crew: One
- Capacity: Three passengers
- Length: 8.07 m (26 ft 6 in)
- Wingspan: 11.53 m (37 ft 10 in)
- Height: 2.29 m (7 ft 6 in)
- Wing area: 18.58 m^{2} (200.0 sq ft) gross
- Airfoil: NACA airfoil 4312
- Empty weight: 771 kg (1,700 lb)
- Max takeoff weight: 1,179 kg (2,599 lb)
- Fuel capacity: 182 L (40 imp gal; 48 US gal) in wing tanks, provision for wing strut mounted external tanks.
- Powerplant: 1 × Lycoming O-540-A1B5 flat six, air-cooled, 190 kW (250 hp)
- Propellers: 2-bladed Harzell A2XK-1

Performance

- Maximum speed: 220 km/h (140 mph, 120 kn) at sea level
- Cruise speed: 161 km/h (100 mph, 87 kn) economical
- Stall speed: 66 km/h (41 mph, 36 kn)
- Never exceed speed: 274 km/h (170 mph, 148 kn) in dive
- Range: 740 km (460 mi, 400 nmi) internal tanks
- Service ceiling: 6,250 m (20,510 ft) service
- Rate of climb: 5.9 m/s (1,160 ft/min) at sea level
- Take-off run: 131 m (430 ft)
- Landing run: 106 m (348 ft)
