= Muniz M-11 =

Experimental aircraft

The Muniz M-11 was an experimental two-seat high-wing strut-braced monoplane trainer for the Brazilian Air Force, which designated it TP-1 (Treinador Primário modelo 1 [Primary Trainer model 1]). The design is due to Col. Antonio M. Muniz, director of the Brazilian Technical Division, Army Air Service.

Manufacture of Muniz designed aircraft was initially the responsibility of Companhia Nacional de Navegação Costiera (CNNC), set up as a military aircraft workshop in the 1930s. The company was renamed Fabrica Brasileira de Avioes in the early 1940s. CNNA (Companhia Nacional de Navegação Aérea) took over manufacture of all Muniz designed aircraft c. 1941. The Muniz M-11 design then evolved into the CNNA HL-1. It was powered by a Continental flat-four A65-8 44.7 kW (60 hp) engine. As the HL-1, it was in production until 1950.

== Bibliography ==
- Emory, John M. G., The Source Book of World War II Aircraft, Blandford Press, 1986 ISBN 0-7137-1722-X.
- Green, William; Fricker, John, The Air Forces of the World: Their History, Development, and Present Strength, Hanover House, 1958 OCLC 671468610.
- Mondey, David (ed); Taylor, Michael (rev), The new Illustrated Encyclopedia of Aircraft, Chartwell Books, 2000 ISBN 0-7858-1164-8.
- Taylor, Michael, J. H. (ed), Jane's Encyclopedia of Aviation, Studio Editions, 1993 ISBN 1-85170-324-1.
