= Montana Coyote =

Aircraft design for homebuilding

Coyote

General information
- Type: Two-seat STOL utility aircraft
- National origin: United States
- Manufacturer: Montana Coyote

History
- First flight: 1991

The Montana Coyote is an American single-engined two-seat STOL aircraft designed for home building by Montana Coyote Inc. of Helena, Montana.

== Design and development ==
The Coyote is a high-wing strut-braced monoplane first flown in early 1991 and sold as kit for home building without an engine. With a steel tube fuselage and wooden wings it is designed to take an engine between 100 and 200 hp (74 to 149 kW) as long as it weighs less than 350 lb (159 kg). It has a fixed tailwheel type landing gear with a cabin for a pilot and passenger side-by-side, it is designed to land and take-off within 350 ft (107 m).

== Specifications ==
Data from Jane's All the World's Aircraft 1995-1996

General characteristics

- Crew: 1
- Capacity: 1 passenger
- Length: 25 ft 0 in (7.62 m)
- Wingspan: 38 ft 0 in (11.58 m)
- Height: 6 ft 6 in (1.98 m)
- Wing area: 165.75 sq ft (15.40 m^{2})
- Empty weight: 900 to 1,050 lb (408 to 476 kg)
- Gross weight: 1,850 lb (839 kg)
- Powerplant: 1 × piston engine , 100 to 200 hp (74 to 149 kW)

Performance

- Maximum speed: 120 mph (193 km/h, 100 kn)
- Cruise speed: 100 mph (161 km/h, 87 kn)
- Stall speed: 35 mph (57 km/h, 30 kn)
- Range: 500 mi (1,804 km, 430 nmi)
- Service ceiling: 15,000 ft (4,575 m)
- Rate of climb: 1,250 ft/min (6.4 m/s)
