= MSW Votec 252T =

Swiss kitbuilt light-sport aircraft

252T

General information
- Type: Side-by-side two seat homebuilt light-sport aircraft
- National origin: Switzerland
- Manufacturer: MSW Aviation, built by Wassmer Aviation

History
- First flight: 26 June 2009
- Developed from: MSW Votec 322

The MSW Votec 252T is a single engine kitbuilt light-sport aircraft with side-by-side seating for two, designed and built in Switzerland and was first flown in 2009. By October 2011 only this first prototype has flown.

== Design and development ==
The Votec 252T is a side-by side seat development of MSW's earlier tandem seat Votec 322. The prototype, powered by a modified Lycoming IO-540-J3A5 flat-six engine, marries the wooden wings and empennage of the latter to a new, carbon fibre fuselage, though a carbon fibre wing is under development. All flying surfaces are straight tapered and square tipped, the wing low mounted and the tailplane located on the upper fuselage; the rudder extends down to the keel. The ailerons are balanced with external spades.

The Votec 252T has a cabin over the wing, with baggage space behind the seat, under a single piece canopy. It has a fixed tricycle undercarriage with fuselage mounted cantilever legs and with speed fairings on all wheels. The nosewheel casters; there is a small tailskid for rudder protection.

The first prototype flew on 26 June 2009. A second prototype with a 260 kW (350 hp) Lycoming AEIO-580 engine, redesignated the Votec 352T, is under development but had not flown by October 2011.

== Specifications (252T) ==
Data from Jane's All the World's Aircraft 2012–13

General characteristics

- Crew: one
- Capacity: one passenger
- Length: 6.75 m (22 ft 2 in)
- Wingspan: 7.70 m (25 ft 3 in)
- Height: 2.20 m (7 ft 3 in)
- Wing area: 11.28 m^{2} (121.4 sq ft)
- Aspect ratio: 5.3
- Empty weight: 630 kg (1,389 lb)
- Max takeoff weight: 950 kg (2,094 lb)
- Fuel capacity: 166 kg (365 lb)
- Powerplant: 1 × Lycoming AEIO-540-X flat-six engine, 190 kW (250 hp)
- Propellers: 4-bladed MT-Propeller MTV-14 constant speed, 1.95 m (6 ft 5 in) diameter (diameter from)

Performance

- Cruise speed: 306 km/h (190 mph, 165 kn)
- Stall speed: 106 km/h (66 mph, 57 kn)
- Never exceed speed: 433 km/h (269 mph, 234 kn)
- Range: 1,398 km (869 mi, 755 nmi)
- g limits: 8/-8
- Rate of climb: 17.8 m/s (3,500 ft/min) maximum from sea level
- Landing and take-off runs: 300 m
