= Morane-Saulnier AN =

French WW1 fighter aircraft

Type AN
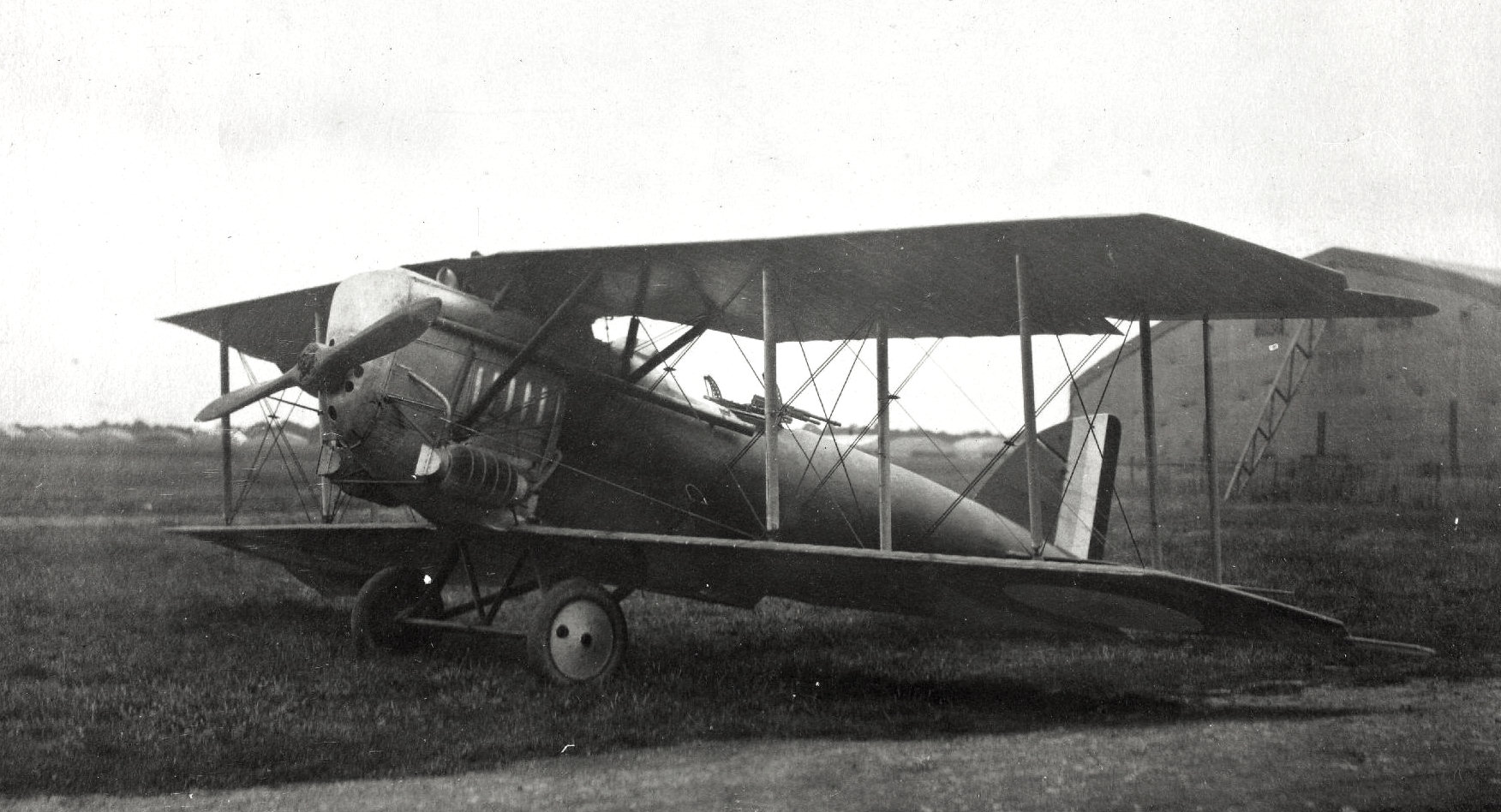
- Morane-Saulnier ANL

General information
- Type: Fighter
- National origin: France
- Manufacturer: Morane-Saulnier

History
- First flight: 27 October 1918

The Morane-Saulnier AN or MoS.31 C.2 was a French two seat fighter prototype of the 1910s that resulted in the development of several other unsuccessful Morane-Saulnier prototypes.

== Development ==
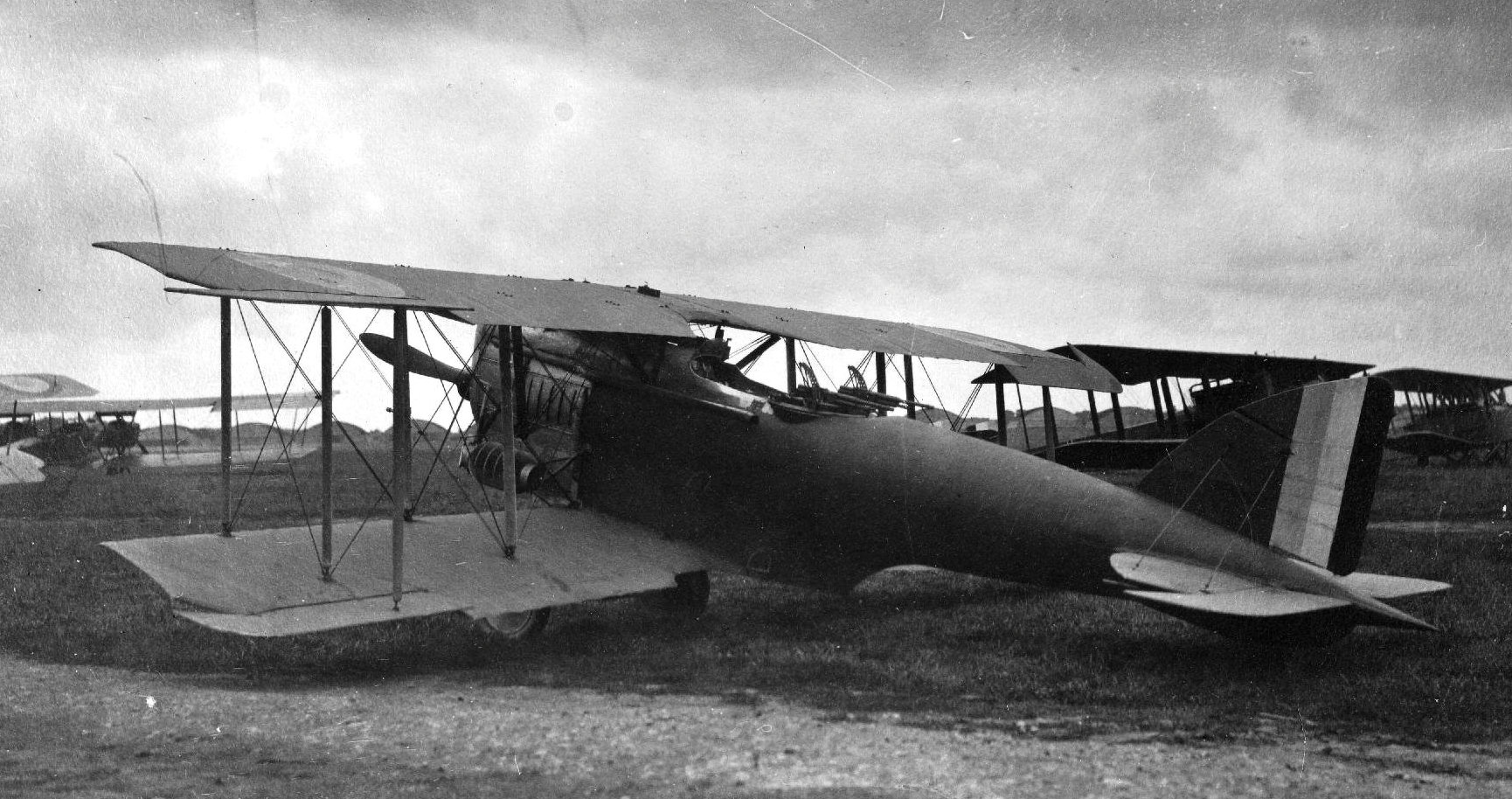
Morane-Saulnier ANL French First World War two seat fighter prototype with Liberty 400hp engine (rear quarter)

Completed in late 1918, the AN was a two-seat fighter designed to use an unorthodox Bugatti U-16 engine. Large and with equal span wings, it was a two-bay biplane with a monocoque fuselage.

First tested in late October 1918, the AN was bested by the SEA 4 and Breguet 17 it was competing against particularly in terms of rate of climb, however it showed sufficient promise that a number of variants were developed. It was ordered into production but never entered service as the SEA and Breguet were already entering service and the end of the First World War curtailed production requirements.

== Variants ==
- Morane-Saulnier AN - prototype with 450 hp Bugatti U-16 engine and radiator in leading edge of wing.
- Morane-Saulnier ANB - modification of prototype with Lamblin radiator.
- Morane-Saulnier ANL - First flown in 1919, the ANL had a 400 hp Liberty L-12 engine.
- Morane-Saulnier ANR - Also flown in 1919, the ANR had a 450 hp Renault 12Kb engine as well as a rear-mounted Vickers gun.
- Morane-Saulnier ANS - Again making its début in 1919, the ANS was the final incarnation of the AN series. Equipped with a 530 hp Salmson 18Z 18-cylinder radial. Showed promise at testing, however no further production took place.
- MoS.31 C.2 Military designation for AN and ANB.
- MoS.32 C.2 Military designation for ANL.
- MoS.33 C.2 Military designation for ANR.
- MoS.34 C.2 Military designation for ANS.

== Specifications (AN) ==
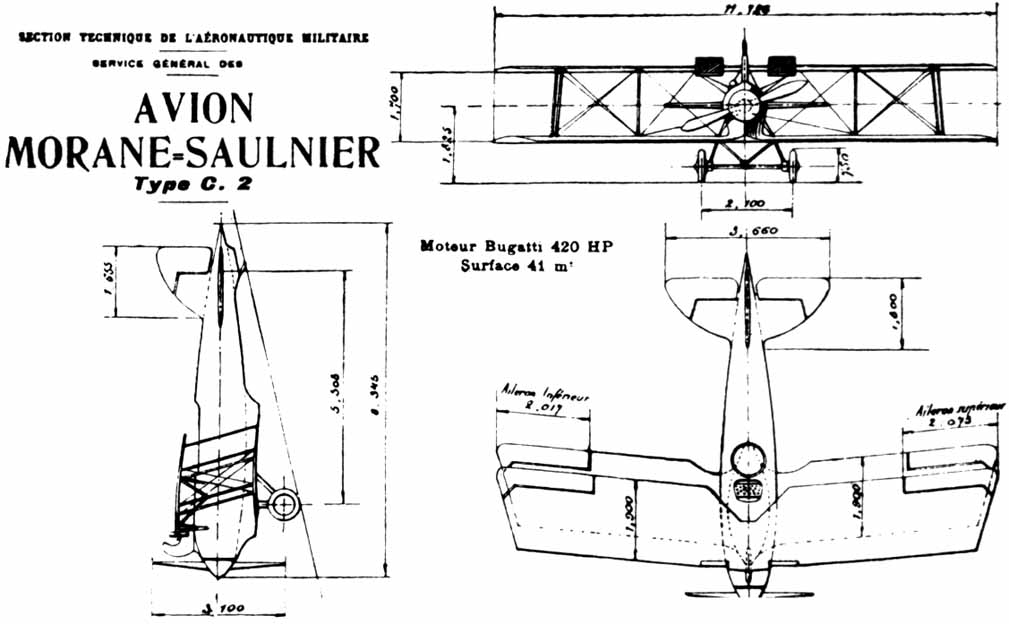
Morane Saulnier AN drawing

General characteristics

- Crew: 1
- Length: 8.34 m (27 ft 5 in)
- Wingspan: 11.73 m (38 ft 6 in)
- Height: 2.77 m (9 ft 1 in)
- Wing area: 41.00 m^{2} (441.33 sq ft)
- Gross weight: 1,770 kg (3,902 lb)
- Powerplant: 1 × Bugatti U-16 16-cylinder water-cooled , 336 kW (450 hp)

Performance

- Maximum speed: 225 km/h (140 mph, 120 kn)

Armament

- 1 x forward-firing .303 Vickers gun
- 2 x rear-mounted .303 Lewis guns
