= Morane-Saulnier MoS-50 =

MoS-50
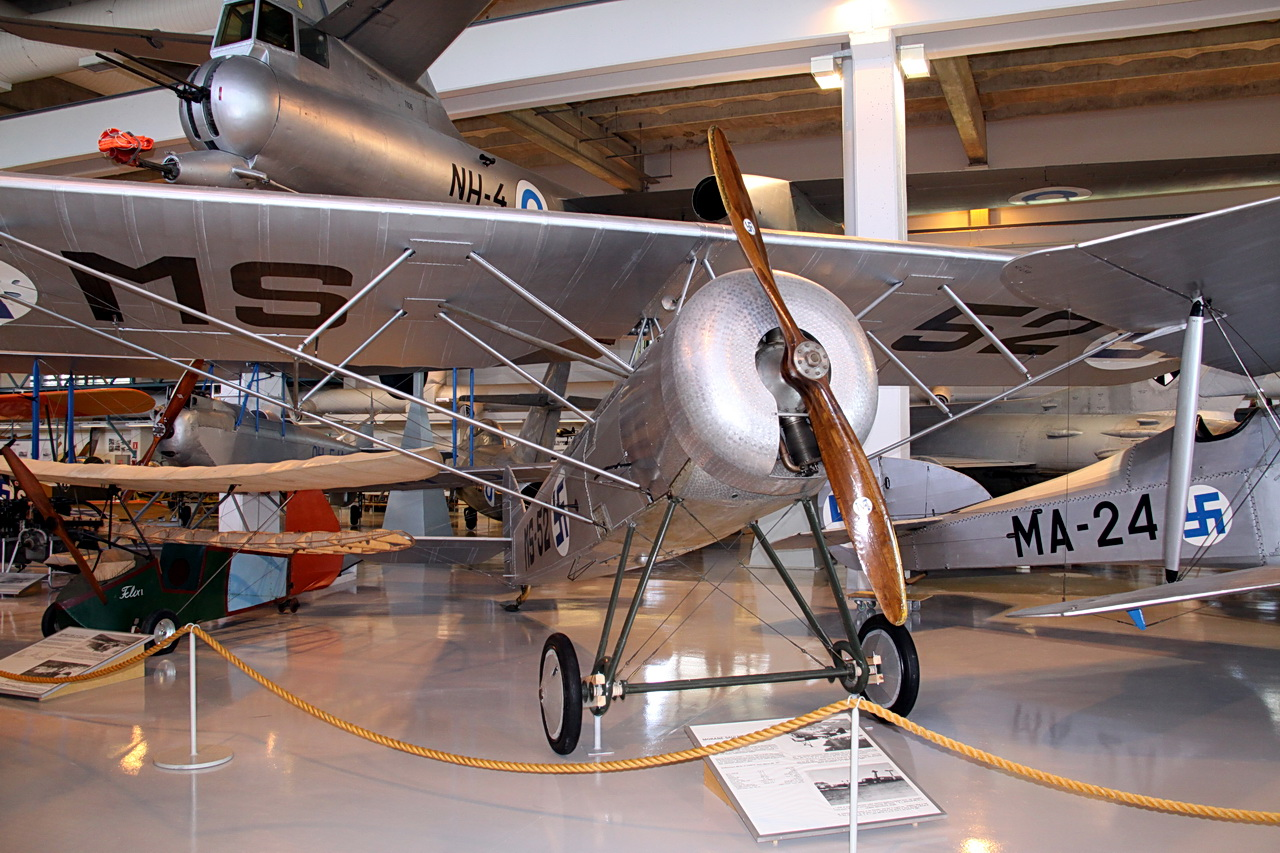
- Morane-Saulnier MS 50C at Aviation Museum of Central Finland

General information
- Type: Trainer aircraft
- Manufacturer: Morane-Saulnier
- Primary users: French Air Force Finnish Air Force; Turkish Air Force

History
- Introduction date: 1924
- Retired: 1930s

The Morane-Saulnier MoS-50 (also MS.50) was a French parasol configuration trainer aircraft built in 1924. The twin-seat aircraft was of wooden construction and was one of the last aircraft to have a rotary engine, a 97 kW (130 hp) Clerget 9B.

In 1925 six MS.50Cs were sold to Finland, where they were used as trainers until 1932. It was very popular in service. Five aircraft of the modified MS.53 type were sold to Turkey.

== Versions ==
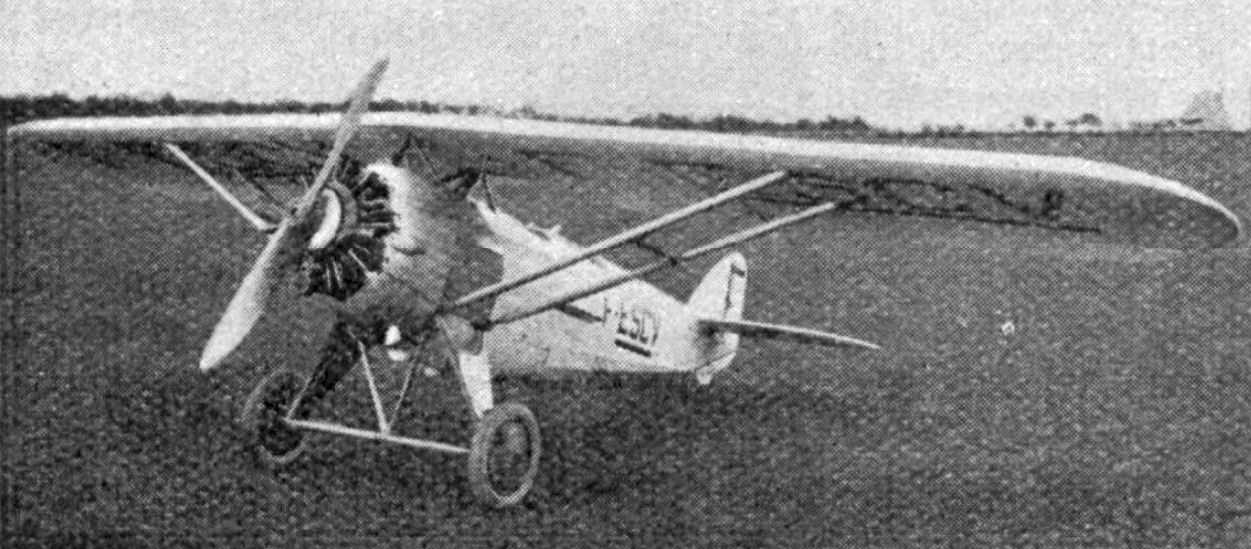
Morane Saulnier MS.122 photo from L'Aérophile-Salon1926

Morane-Saulier M.S.50
Three seat prototype, powered by a 89 kW (120 hp) Salmson AC9 9-cylinder radial engine.
M.S.50C
Two-seat primary trainer aircraft powered by a 97 kW (130 hp) Clerget 9B rotary engine.
M.S.51
Powered by a 130 kW (180 hp) Hispano-Suiza 8ab V-8 cylinder piston engine. Only three were built.
M.S.53
Improved version of M.S.51, with same engine.
M.S.120
M.S.53 with a 170 kW (230 hp) Salmson engine.

== Operators ==
France
French Air Force
Finland
Finnish Air Force
Turkey
Turkish Air Force

== Surviving aircraft ==
The only preserved aircraft of this type is at the Aviation Museum of Central Finland.

== Specifications (MS 50C) ==
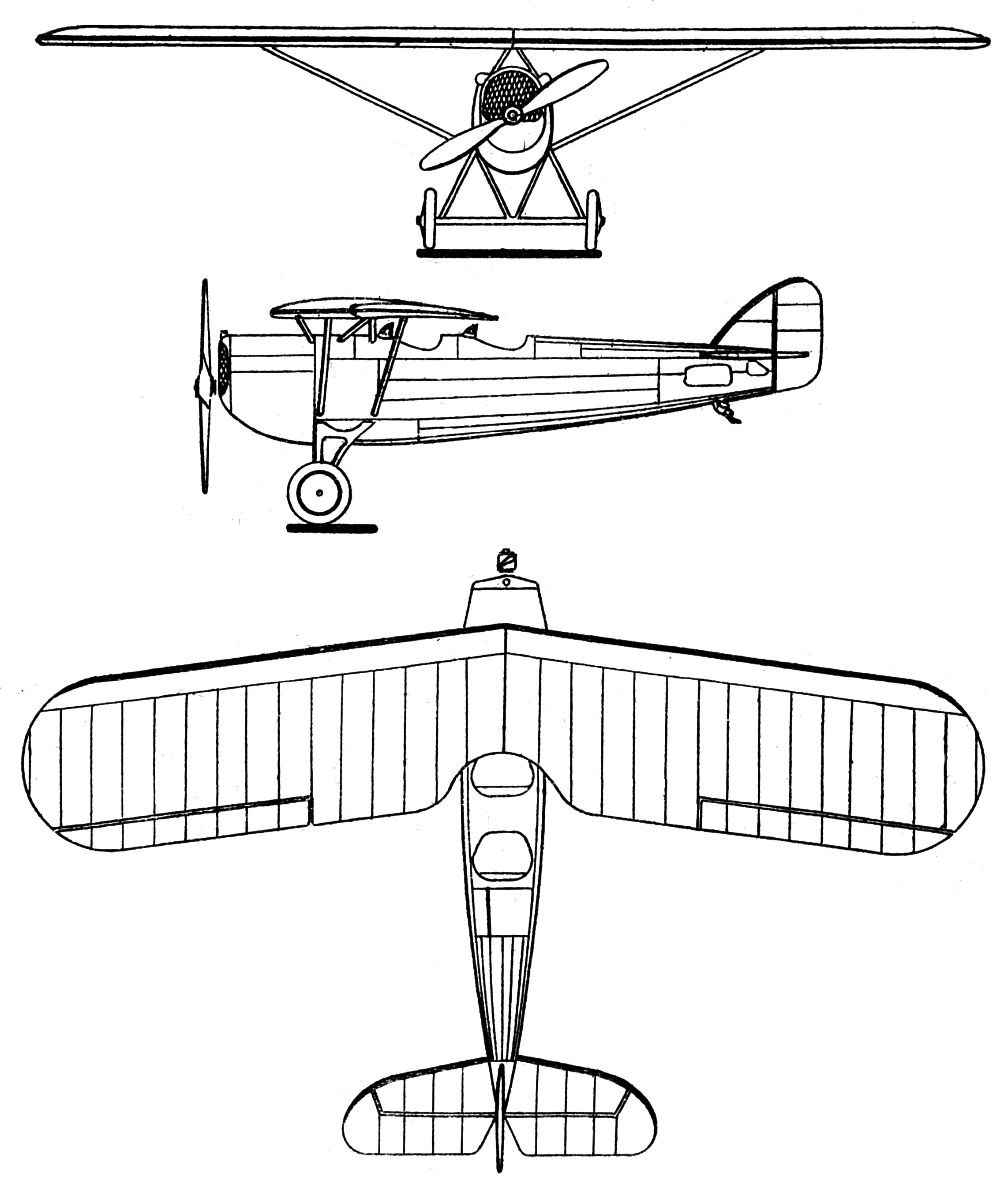
Morane-Saulnier MoS.53 3-view drawing from Les Ailes May 27, 1926

Data from Thulinista Hornettiin

General characteristics

- Crew: 2
- Length: 7.6 m (24 ft 11 in)
- Wingspan: 11.7 m (38 ft 5 in)
- Height: 3.1 m (10 ft 2 in)
- Wing area: 24 m^{2} (260 sq ft)
- Max takeoff weight: 860 kg (1,896 lb)
- Powerplant: 1 × Clerget 9B 9-cyl air-cooled rotary piston engine, 100 kW (130 hp)
- Propellers: 2-bladed

Performance

- Maximum speed: 170 km/h (110 mph, 92 kn)
- Endurance: 2½ hours
- Service ceiling: 5,500 m (18,000 ft)
- Rate of climb: 2 m/s (390 ft/min)

== See also ==
Related lists

- List of interwar military aircraft
- List of military aircraft of France
