= MS Parafly =

German aircraft manufacturer

- Company type: Privately held company
- Industry: Aerospace
- Founded: 2001
- Founder: Martin Sauter
- Defunct: 2005
- Fate: Out of business
- Headquarters: Meßstetten, Germany
- Products: Paramotors

MS Parafly was a German aircraft manufacturer based in Meßstetten and founded by Martin Sauter. The company specialized in the design and manufacture of paramotors in the form of ready-to-fly aircraft for the US FAR 103 Ultralight Vehicles rules and the European microlight categories.

The company seems to have been founded about 2001 and gone out of business in 2005.

The company's products consisted of the Skyward line of paramotors, all powered by the Solo 210 engine series.

Reviewer Rene Coulon noted in 2003 that the Skyward line of paramotors was, "well known worldwide for its reinforced chassis and very efficient engine." Coulon noted at that time that the line was selling well and that the German product certification process had resulted in a reduction in the line's noise output.

== Aircraft ==
Summary of aircraft built by MS Parafly
Model name	First flight	Number built	Type
MS Parafly Skyward	2001		paramotor
