= Moskalyev SAM-6 =

SAM-6
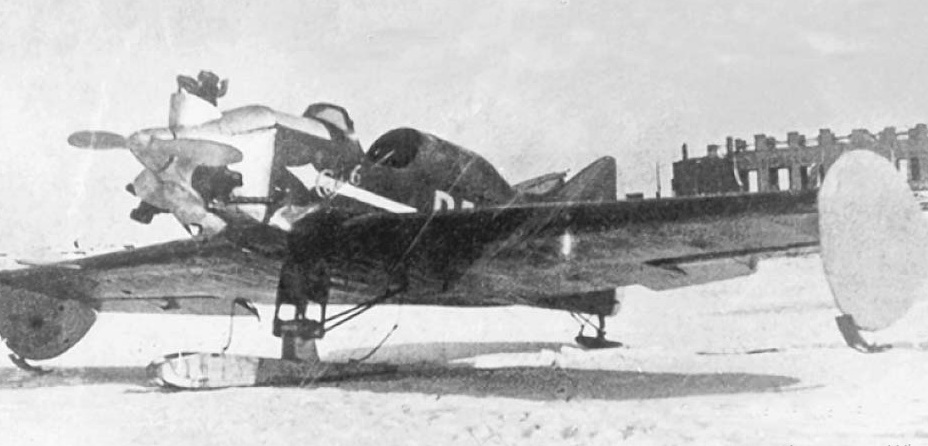

General information
- Type: experimental
- National origin: USSR
- Manufacturer: GAZ-18, Voronezh
- Designer: Aleksandr Sergeyevitch Moskalyev
- Number built: 1

History
- First flight: early 1934

The Moskalyev SAM-6 was an experimental design intended to test the suitability of monowheel undercarriages, lighter than conventional gear, on tailless aircraft.

== Design ==
The wooden SAM-6 had a conventional tail on its short fuselage but its low wing had, in addition, Scheibe-type, oval wingtip fins and rudders. Sprung skids on their underside provided the lateral stability that its central undercarriage did not.

It was powered by a 65 hp (48 kW), three cylinder M-23 radial engine mounted in the pointed nose of its deep fuselage and had a single seat, open cockpit.

== Development ==
For its first flight, made in early 1934, the SAM-6 had a long, non-retracting central ski rather than a wheel, and tail ski rather than a skid, both mounted on vertical shock-absorbing struts. The trials were reasonably successful and the main ski was replaced by a wheel in a trouser fairing. No reports from tests with this landing gear are known but by late 1934 the SAM-6 had been modified into the more conventional SAM-6bis, which had two fixed, trousered mainwheels. It also had a second, tandem seat in an enclosed, instrumented cockpit.

== Variants ==
SAM-6
Original configuration with central mono-skid/wheel main gear. Single-seater with open cockpit.
SAM-6bis
Conventional, twin mainwheel gear and a second seat in enclosed cockpit.

== Specifications ==
Data from Osprey Encyclopedia of Russian Aircraft 1875-1995

General characteristics

- Crew: one
- Length: 4.5 m (14 ft 9 in)
- Wingspan: 8.0 m (26 ft 3 in)
- Wing area: 12 m^{2} (130 sq ft)
- Empty weight: 380 kg (838 lb)
- Gross weight: 500 kg (1,102 lb)
- Powerplant: 1 × M-23 3-cylinder radial, 48 kW (65 hp)
- Propellers: 2-bladed

Performance

- Maximum speed: 130 km/h (81 mph, 70 kn)
- Range: 200 km (120 mi, 110 nmi)
- Service ceiling: 3,000 m (9,800 ft)
- Landing speed: 55 km/h (34 mph; 30 kn)
