= Mountaineer Trikes Mite-Lite =

Mite-Lite

General information
- Type: Ultralight trike
- National origin: United States
- Manufacturer: Mountaineer Trikes
- Status: Production completed, company out of business 1998

The Mountaineer Trikes Mite-Lite is a family of American flying wing ultralight trikes that was designed and produced by Mountaineer Trikes. The aircraft were supplied as a kit for amateur construction.

== Design and development ==
The Mite-Lite was designed to comply with the US FAR 103 Ultralight Vehicles rules, including the category's maximum empty weight of 254 lb (115 kg). The Mite-Lite has a standard empty weight of 200 lb (91 kg). It features a cable-braced hang glider-style high-wing, weight-shift controls, a single-seat, open cockpit, tricycle landing gear and a single engine in pusher configuration.

The Mite-Lite is very minimalist lightweight trike, made from bolted-together aluminum tubing, with its single surface wing covered in Dacron sailcloth. Its wing is supported by a single tube-type kingpost and uses an "A" frame control bar. The wing is a large 205 sq ft (19.0 m^{2}) area and is suitable for power-off soaring flight. The aircraft can be disassembled by one person in 45 minutes for ground transportation on a car top or for storage. The factory standard powerplant supplied with the Mite-Lite was the 28 hp (21 kW) Rotax 277 single cylinder, two-stroke aircraft engine.

Production of all models ended when the company went out of business in 1998.

== Variants ==
Mite-Lite
Initial model, 28 hp (21 kW) Rotax 277 engine
Solo 175
Improved model, 50 hp (37 kW) Rotax 503 engine. 25 reported as flying by 1998.
Dual 175
A Solo 175 with a second seat fitted, 50 hp (37 kW) Rotax 503 engine. Ten reported flying by 1998.

== Specifications (Mite-Lite) ==
Data from Cliche

General characteristics

- Crew: one
- Wing area: 205 sq ft (19.0 m^{2})
- Empty weight: 200 lb (91 kg)
- Gross weight: 450 lb (204 kg)
- Fuel capacity: 5 U.S. gallons (19 L; 4.2 imp gal)
- Powerplant: 1 × Rotax 277 single cylinder, two-stroke aircraft engine, 28 hp (21 kW)

Performance

- Cruise speed: 35 mph (56 km/h, 30 kn)
- Stall speed: 23 mph (37 km/h, 20 kn)
- Rate of climb: 600 ft/min (3.0 m/s)
