= Morane-Saulnier BB =

Type BB, Type BH
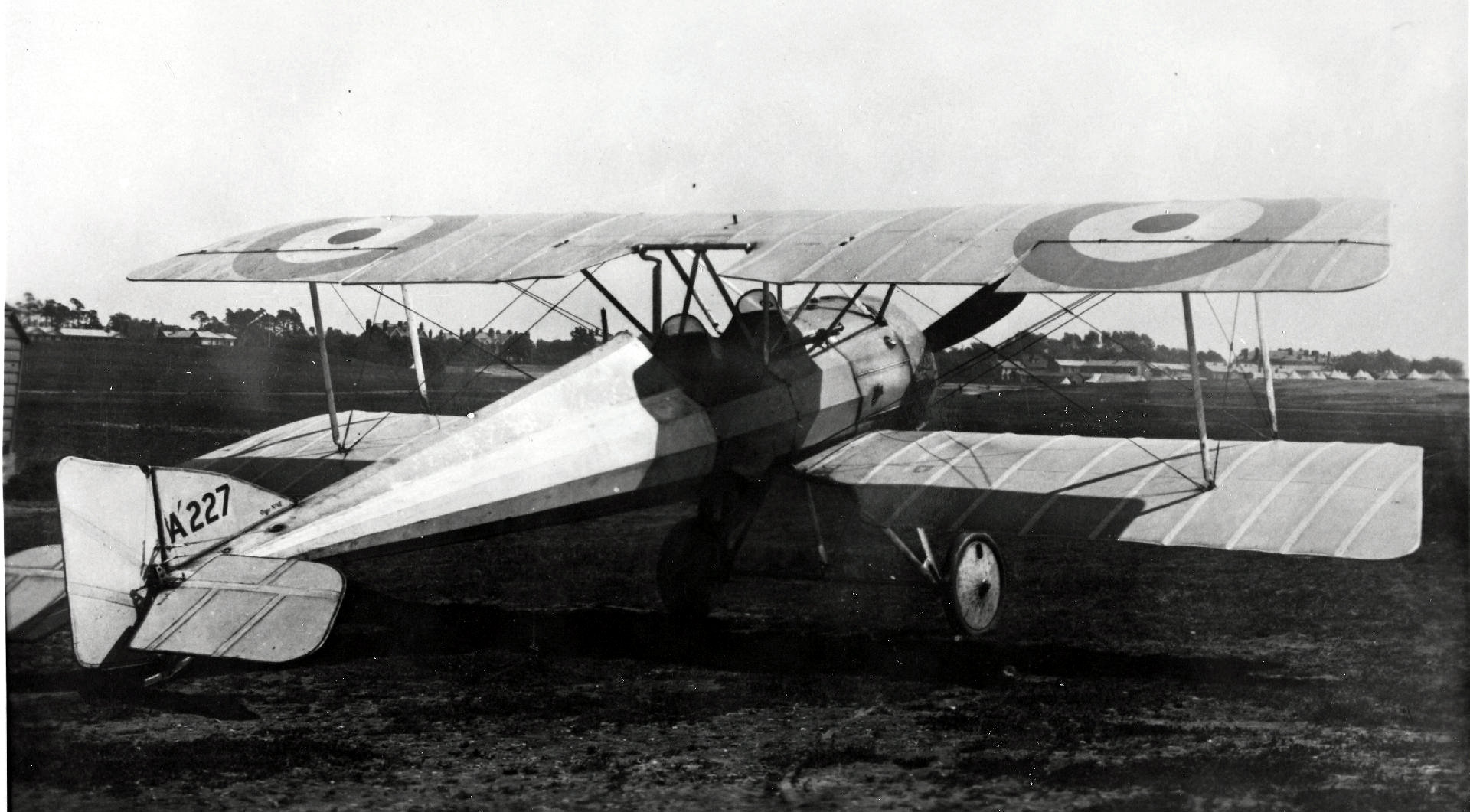
- RFC Morane-Saulnier BB

General information
- Type: Observation aircraft
- National origin: France
- Manufacturer: Morane-Saulnier
- Status: retired
- Primary user: Royal Flying Corps
- Number built: 107

History
- First flight: 1915

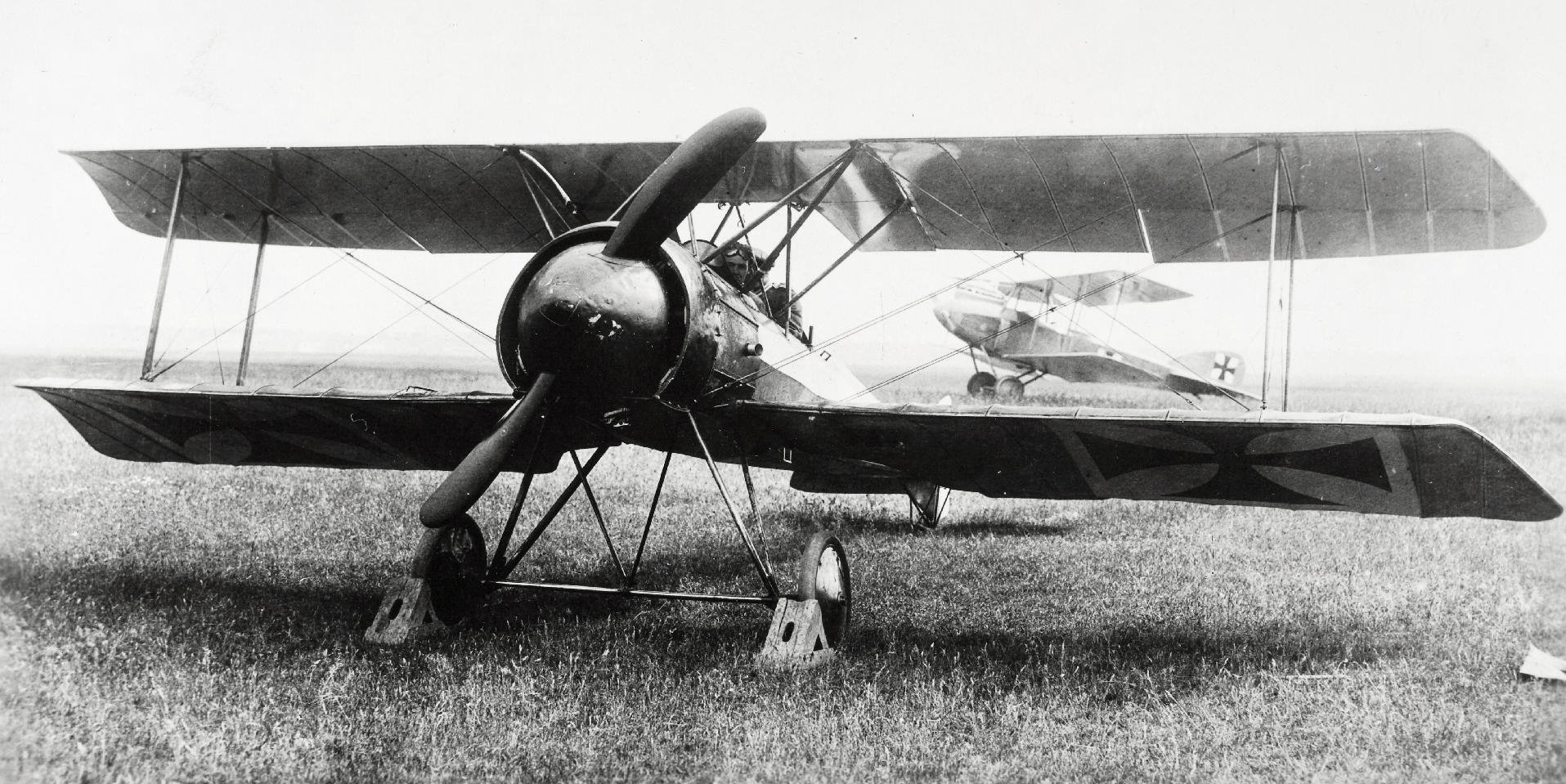
Captured Morane-Saulnier BB

The Morane-Saulnier BB was a military observation aircraft produced in France during World War I for use by Britain's Royal Flying Corps. It was a conventional single-bay biplane design with seating for the pilot and observer in tandem, open cockpits. The original order called for 150 aircraft powered by 110-hp Le Rhône 9J rotary engines, but shortages meant that most of the 94 aircraft eventually built were delivered with 80 hp Le Rhône 9C rotaries instead. A water-cooled Hispano-Suiza 8A engine was trialled as an alternative in the Type BH, but this remained experimental only. A production licence was sold to the Spanish company Compañía Española de Construcciones Aeronáuticas (CECA), which built twelve fitted with Hispano-Suiza engines in 1916.

== Operational history ==
The type equipped a number of RFC and RNAS squadrons both in its original observation role and, equipped with a forward-firing Lewis gun mounted on the top wing, as a fighter.

== Variants ==
MS.7
official French government STAe designation for the BB
MS.8
official French government STAe designation for the BH
BB
Le Rhône 9J rotary powered variant
BH
Hispano-Suiza 8A V-8 powered variant
CECA-MS or CECA-Saulnier
designations used for BB/BH built in Spain

== Operators ==
United Kingdom

- Royal Flying Corps
  - No. 1 Squadron RFC
  - No. 3 Squadron RFC
  - No. 12 Squadron RFC
  - No. 60 Squadron RFC
- Royal Naval Air Service
  - No. 1 Squadron RNAS
  - No. 3 Squadron RNAS
  - No. 4 Squadron RNAS

Spain

- Spanish Air Force

Russia

- Imperial Russian Air Service

== Specifications (BB) ==
Data from Parmentier

General characteristics

- Crew: Two, pilot and observer
- Length: 7.00 m (23 ft 0 in)
- Wingspan: 8.65 m (28 ft 5 in)
- Height: 2.54 m (8 ft 4 in)
- Wing area: 23.0 m^{2} (247 sq ft)
- Gross weight: 750 kg (1,650 lb)
- Powerplant: 1 × Le Rhône 9Ja , 82 kW (110 hp)

Performance

- Maximum speed: 147 km/h (92 mph, 80 kn)
- Service ceiling: 4,000 m (13,000 ft)

Armament

- 1 × flexible, rearward-firing .303 Lewis gun for observer
