= Mohawk M-2-C Chieftain =

Prototype twin aircraft

M-2-C Chieftain
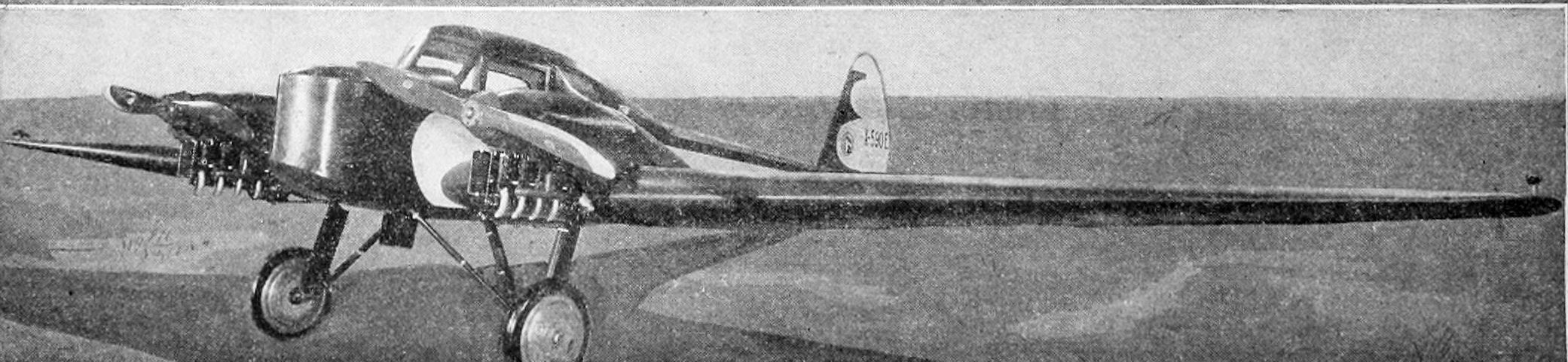

General information
- Type: Light Twin
- National origin: United States
- Manufacturer: Mohawk Aircraft
- Number built: 1

History
- Introduction date: 1930

The Mohawk M-2-C Chieftain is a prototype light twin aircraft from the Mohawk Aircraft Company.

== Design ==
The M-2-C is a low-wing three place twin engine aircraft with conventional landing gear powered by two Michigan Rover engines.

== Operational history ==
X-590E was registered on March 30, 1929 and sold several times in rapid succession while remaining registered in Minneapolis. The Mohawk Aircraft company was dissolved in 1930.

== Specifications (M-2-C) ==
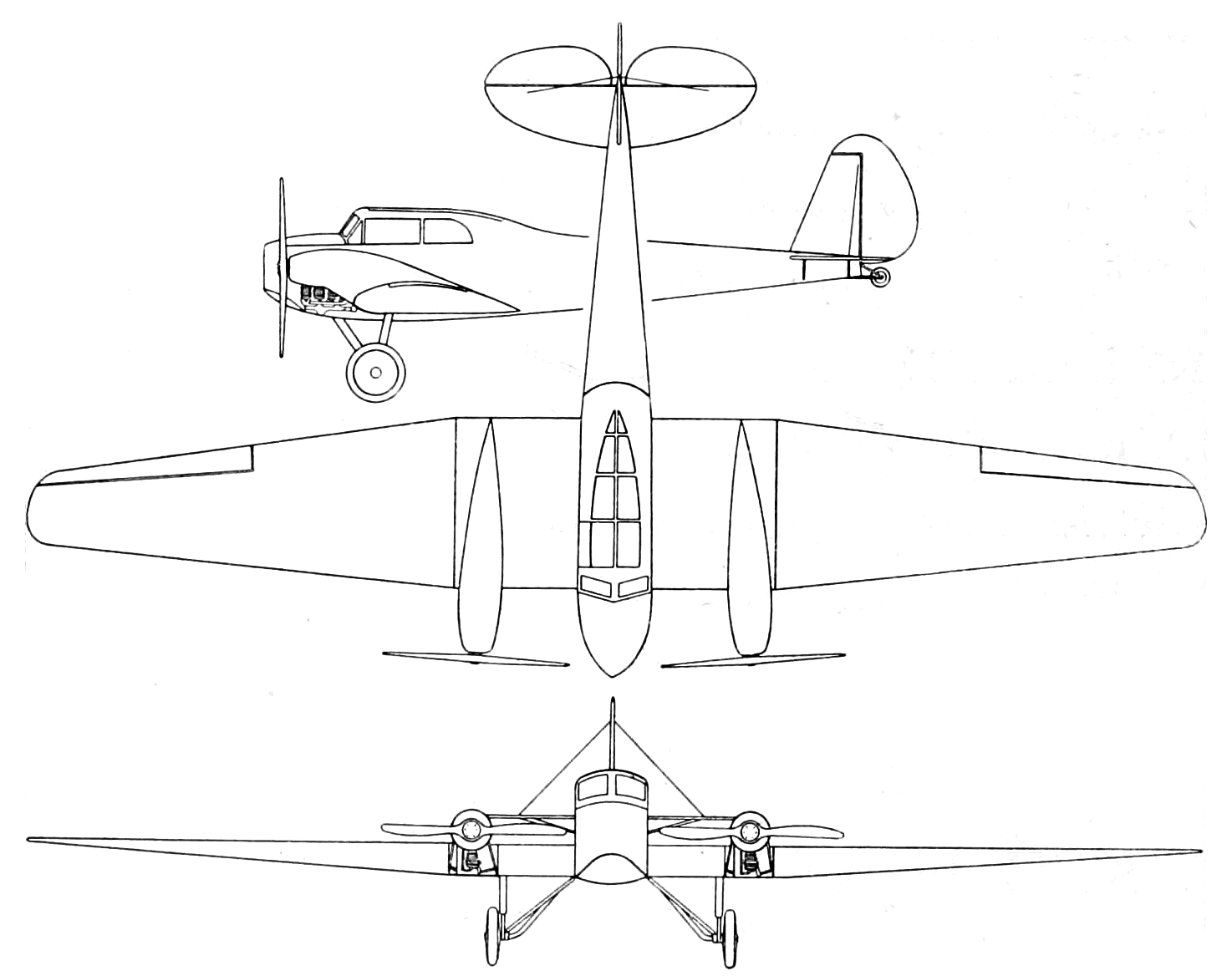
Mohawk M2-C 3-view drawing from Aero Digest May 1929

Data from Skyways

General characteristics

- Crew: 1
- Capacity: 2
- Length: 26 ft (7.9 m)
- Wingspan: 44 ft (13 m)
- Powerplant: 2 × Michigan Rover Air cooled piston, 55 hp (41 kW) each
- Propellers: 2-bladed

Performance

- Maximum speed: 91 kn (105 mph, 169 km/h)
- Cruise speed: 78 kn (90 mph, 140 km/h)
