= Sándor Minder =

Hungarian ice hockey player (1907–1983)

- Born: 25 October 1907; Budapest, Austria-Hungary
- Died: 17 May 1983 (aged 75); Zürich, Switzerland
- Position: Centre
- Played for: Budapesti Korcsolyázó Egylet
- National team: Hungary
- Playing career: 1927–1940

Sándor Minder or Magyar (25 October 1907 — 17 May 1983) was a Hungarian ice hockey player. He played for the Hungarian national team at the 1928 and 1936 Winter Olympics and several World Championships.
