= Moskalyev SAM-2 =

SAM-2

General information
- Type: Military trainer flying boat
- National origin: USSR
- Manufacturer: GAZ-18, Voronezh
- Designer: Aleksandr Sergeyevitch Moskalyev

History
- First flight: Early spring 1931

The Moskalyev SAM-2, alternatively known as the MU-3, was a Soviet two seat introductory training flying boat tested in 1931. It was not chosen for production.

== Design and development ==
The SAM-2 was an extensive modification of the Grigorovich MU-2, MU standing for morskoi uchyebnyi or marine trainer. It retained the pusher configuration biplane layout, its open, side-by-side cockpit and many components. New features were an improved hull underside, or planing bottom, smaller wings and a much lighter structure.

== Operational history ==
It was completed in February 1931 and was officially tested in the spring. These led to its abandonment in favour of the parasol wing Shavrov Sh-2 amphibian which was built in large numbers, some active as late as 1964.

== Specifications ==
Data from Osprey Encyclopedia of Russian Aircraft 1875-1995

General characteristics

- Crew: two
- Length: 8.0 m (26 ft 3 in) approx
- Wingspan: 10.5 m (34 ft 5 in) approx
- Wing area: 28 m^{2} (300 sq ft) approx
- Empty weight: 650 kg (1,433 lb)
- Gross weight: 920 kg (2,028 lb)
- Powerplant: × Shvetsov M-11 five cylinder air-cooled radial (the M-11 subtype fitted is not known but powers were in the range 100–200 hp (75–149 kW))

Performance

- Maximum speed: 132 km/h (82 mph, 71 kn) at sea lefel
- Service ceiling: 2,300 m (7,500 ft)
- Time to altitude: 10 min to 1,000 m (3,300 ft)
