= Monnett Mini =

Mini

General information
- Type: Homebuilt aircraft
- National origin: United States
- Designer: John Monnett, Cal Parker
- Number built: 1

History
- Introduction date: 1970
- First flight: 1970
- Developed from: Parker JT-1

The Monnett Mini, also called the Mini Messashidt, was an early John Monnett modification of the Parker Jeanies Teenie.

== Design and development ==
The Mini was based on the JT-1 with a larger chord wing, a fully enclosed cockpit and removable wings. The aircraft was all-metal low-wing single seater with conventional landing gear. The prototype aircraft featured a Messerschmitt paint scheme. Power came from a 1300cc Volkswagen air-cooled engine that would be the basis for most of Monnett's future designs.

== Operational history ==
The Mini was introduced at the Experimental Aircraft Association airshow in 1970. Monnett was not pleased with the aircraft which demonstrated a 1400fpm descent rate power-off. Shortly thereafter built the VW-powered Sonerai I design, introduced in 1971.

== Specifications (variant specified) ==
Data from Air Trails

General characteristics

- Crew: 1
- Length: 16 ft (4.9 m)
- Wingspan: 17 ft 8 in (5.38 m)
- Gross weight: 600 lb (272 kg)
- Powerplant: 1 × 1300cc Volkswagen air-cooled engine Horizontally opposed four cylinder piston, 46 hp (34 kW)

Performance

- Cruise speed: 87 kn (100 mph, 160 km/h)
- Stall speed: 56 kn (65 mph, 105 km/h)

== See also ==
Related development

- Parker Jeanie's Teenie
