= Morane-Saulnier B =

1910s French aircraft

General information
- Type: Trainer/sports aircraft

History
- First flight: 1911

The Morane-Saulnier B was an early French single-seat training and sports monoplane.

== Design and development ==
The Morane-Saulnier B was a mid-wing monoplane that was made of wood.

== Specifications ==
Data from

General characteristics

- Crew: two
- Length: 6.30 m (20 ft 8 in)
- Empty weight: 340 kg (750 lb)
- Gross weight: 500 kg (1,102 lb)
- Powerplant: 1 × Gnome air-cooled rotary piston engine , 60 kW (80 hp)

Performance

- Maximum speed: 130 km/h (81 mph, 70 kn)
