= MSrE M-20 =

General information
- Type: Training glider
- National origin: Hungary
- Manufacturer: MSrE (Müegyetemi Sportrepülő Egyesület)
- Designer: Ernő Rubik and Endre Janscó

History
- First flight: Spring 1936

The MSrE M-20 was a Hungarian primary glider with a better performance than the first generation of such aircraft. One of its designers was Ernő Rubik and the MSrE M-20 was his first major contribution. Only one was built.

== Design and development ==
In 1934 the MSrE (Müegyetemi Sportrepülő Egyesület or in English the Technical University's Sports Flying Group) decided to design and build a primary glider with better performance than the influential 1928 Jacobs Hols der Teufel. The resulting MSrE M-20 was designed by Ernő Rubik and Endre Janscó. It was Rubik's first design so is known sometimes as the R-01 but more commonly by its nickname EMESE-B. Emese is how MSrE sounds in spoken Hungarian and at that time Hungarian training gliders fell into aircraft class B.

Like the Hols der Teufel, the M-20 had a flat frame fuselage with its wing mounted on its top and with a nacelle enclosing the pilot's open fuselage. Its two spar wing was rectangular in plan out to rounded tips. It was plywood covered ahead of the forward spar and fabric covered behind. On each side a streamlined V-strut from the fuselage keel to the spars braced the wing. Broad-chord ailerons filled more than half the span.

Structurally, the EMESE-B had a flat girder fuselage with straight, multi-part flanges or longerons. Starting under the wing, the upper flange sloped down markedly then joined a near-horizontal flange which reached to the tail. The forward-projecting lower flange began at the nose and was itself an I-beam structure back to the trailing edge where it met a single piece flange sloping upwards to the tail. The web that joined the two flanges began with two near-vertical members under the wings, followed by two pairs of alternately gently and steeply sloping members.

The vertices of the wing bracing struts and a rubber-ring sprung landing skid were mounted on the strengthened lower flange, as was the pilot's seat. This was placed under the wing leading edge and enclosed in a plywood and fabric covered nacelle which reached back to the first sloping web member. Behind this member the frame was uncovered back to the triangular fin which terminated the fuselage and was fabric covered. It carried a straight-edged rudder that reached down to the keel. The EMESE-B's straight tapered tailplane was mounted on top of the fuselage and braced from below with V-struts to the lower flange. It carried straight edged elevators cut-away for rudder movement.

Records of the use of the EMESE-B during 1936 are few but in 1937 it crashed, damaging the fuselage. New rules required its replacement fuselage to be a steel tube structure and this was entirely ply covered, forming a deep-sided hexagonal section fuselage. The original wing was reused but there were empennage alterations, with a new, narrow-chord fin.

== Variants ==
EMESE-B
Original version with wooden, open frame fuselage.
EMESE-C
Post-1937 crash rebuild with ply-enclosed, steel frame fuselage and modified fin.

== Specifications (EMESE-B) ==
Data from Hungarian gliders 1933-2000

General characteristics

- Crew: One
- Length: 6.25 m (20 ft 6 in)
- Wingspan: 12.56 m (41 ft 2 in)
- Wing area: 17.6 m^{2} (189 sq ft)
- Aspect ratio: 8.96
- Empty weight: 120 kg (265 lb)
- Gross weight: 210 kg (463 lb)

Performance

- Maximum glide ratio: 17, best
- Rate of sink: 0.8 m/s (160 ft/min) miniimum
