= Mono Aircraft Monoprep =

American light aircraft

Monoprep 218
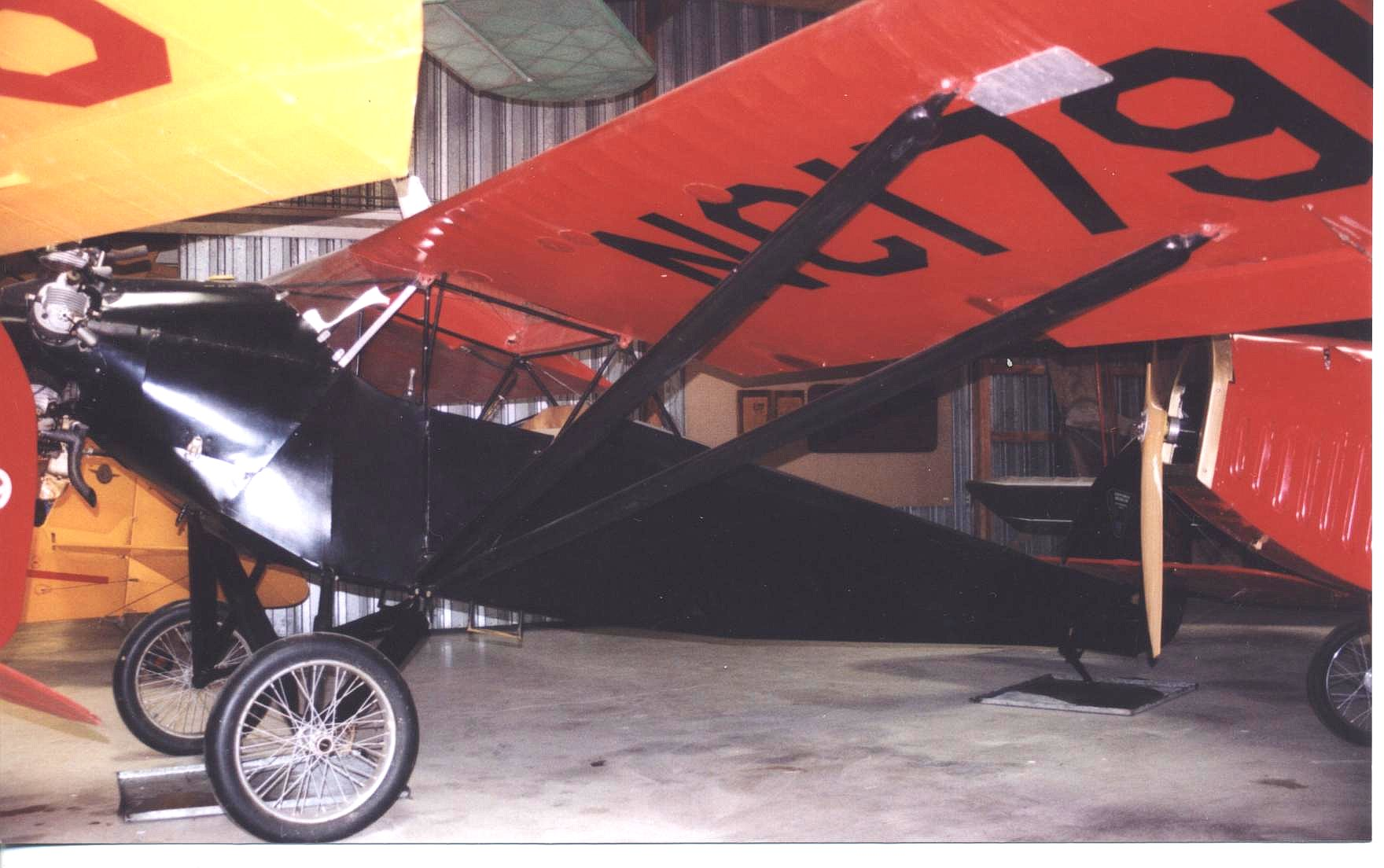
- 1929-built Monoprep 218 displayed at the Air Power Museum, Ottumwa, Iowa in June 2006

General information
- Type: light sporting monoplane
- National origin: United States
- Manufacturer: Mono Aircraft
- Primary user: private pilot owners
- Number built: circa 68

History
- First flight: 1927

The Mono Aircraft Monoprep was an American light civil sporting monoplane of the late 1920s.

== Development and operation ==
Mono Aircraft was founded in 1927 and their first design was the Monoprep high-wing sporting two-seat open cockpit monoplane. Eight Monopreps were built.

The improved Monoprep 218 followed the initial model in 1929, with a 3 ft (1 metre) shorter wingspan giving increased speed. 84 Monoprep 218s were built by 1930. One long-nosed aircraft was used to test one of the two Lambert H-106 engines during 1930.

The sole surviving example of the Monoprep 218 NC179K was publicly displayed in airworthy condition in the Airpower Museum at Ottumwa Iowa. It has now changed into private hands and is under restoration to fly again.

== Specifications (Monoprep 218) ==
Data from U.S. Civil Aircraft Vol. 3 (ATC 201–300)

General characteristics

- Crew: 2
- Length: 21 ft 0 in (6.40 m)
- Wingspan: 32 ft 0 in (9.75 m)
- Height: 6 ft 3 in (1.91 m)
- Wing area: 143 sq ft (13.3 m^{2})
- Airfoil: Clark Y
- Empty weight: 783 lb (355 kg)
- Gross weight: 1,288 lb (584 kg)
- Fuel capacity: 15 US gal (12 imp gal; 57 L)
- Powerplant: 1 × Velie M-5 5-cylinder radial engine, 55 hp (41 kW)

Performance

- Maximum speed: 92 mph (148 km/h, 80 kn)
- Cruise speed: 80 mph (130 km/h, 70 kn)
- Stall speed: 37 mph (60 km/h, 32 kn)
- Range: 290 mi (470 km, 250 nmi)
- Service ceiling: 9,000 ft (2,700 m)
- Rate of climb: 680 ft/min (3.5 m/s)
