= Morane-Saulnier MS.603 =

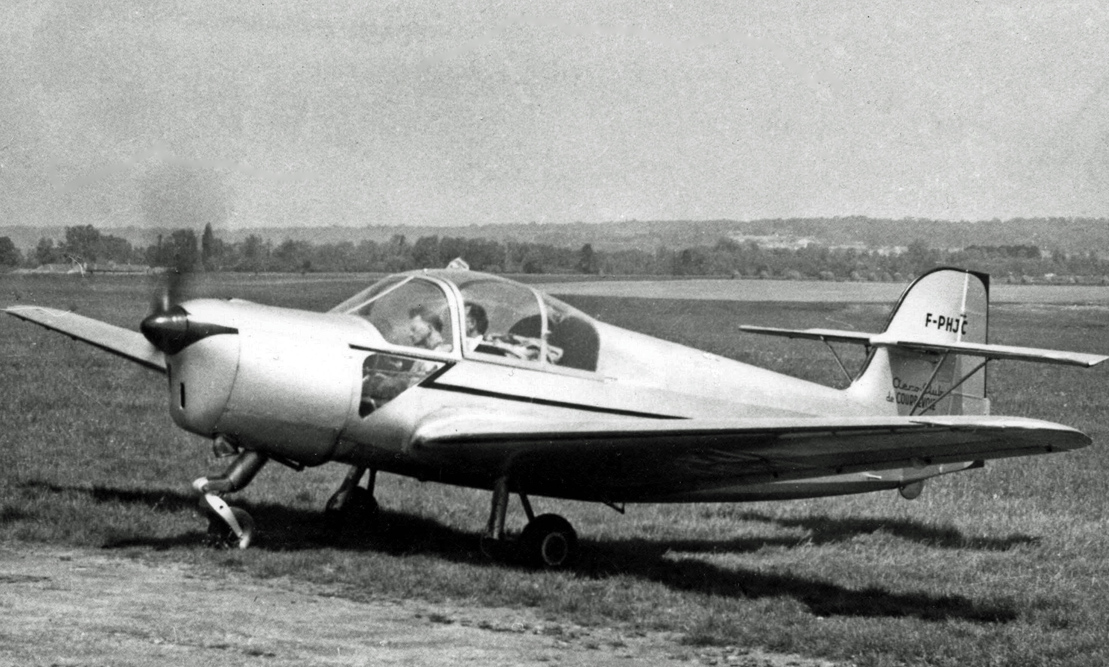
- The MS.603 at Saint-Cyr-l'École near Paris in May 1957 when operated by the Aero Club de Courbevoie

General information
- Type: club aircraft
- National origin: France
- Manufacturer: Morane Saulnier
- Status: stored in a museum in France
- Primary user: aero clubs
- Number built: 3

History
- First flight: 1947
- Developed from: MS.600

The Morane-Saulnier MS.603 was a French-built two-seat light aircraft of the late 1940s.

== Design and development ==
The MS.603 was one of three aircraft constructed in the MS.600 series which were built to compete in an officially-sponsored 1947 contest for a light two-seat side-by-side club aircraft to be powered by a 75 hp (56 kW) engine.

The initial MS.600, powered by a 75 hp (56 kW) Mathis G-4F piston engine, was a fixed gear, low-winged monoplane of mixed construction, with a single fin and the tailplane set just above the fuselage and a clear perspex canopy over a side-by-side cockpit for two persons. All three aircraft, MS.600, MS.602 and MS.603, were ready for flight in 1947 with the MS.600 flying on 4 June 1947.

A parallel development, the MS.602, powered by a 75 hp (56 kW) Minie 4DA piston engine, was similar in most respects to the MS.600 and flew on 24 June 1947.

A more powerful derivative emerged as the MS.603, powered by a 100 hp (75 kW) Hirth HM 504A-2 engine and fitted with a fixed tricycle undercarriage. The tailplane was also moved to a high set position on the fin and supported by struts.

== Operational history ==
Initially registered F-WCZU in the experimental series, and re-registered F-PHQY in the amateur-operated series, the MS.602 was owned by Messieurs Gambi and Chanson and based at Saint-Cyr-l'École airfield to the west of Paris. By 1983, the aircraft had been withdrawn from service and scrapped.

The sole MS.603, construction No. 1, was initially registered F-WCZT and later re-registered F-PHJC. It was flown for many years by the Aero Club de Courbevoie. By 1963 it was operated by M. Jean Forster, based at Guyancourt airfield, but was withdrawn from use by 2006 when it was stored at the Musee de l'Aviation du Mas Palegry - (Mas Palegry Aviation Museum) near Perpignan.

== Variants ==
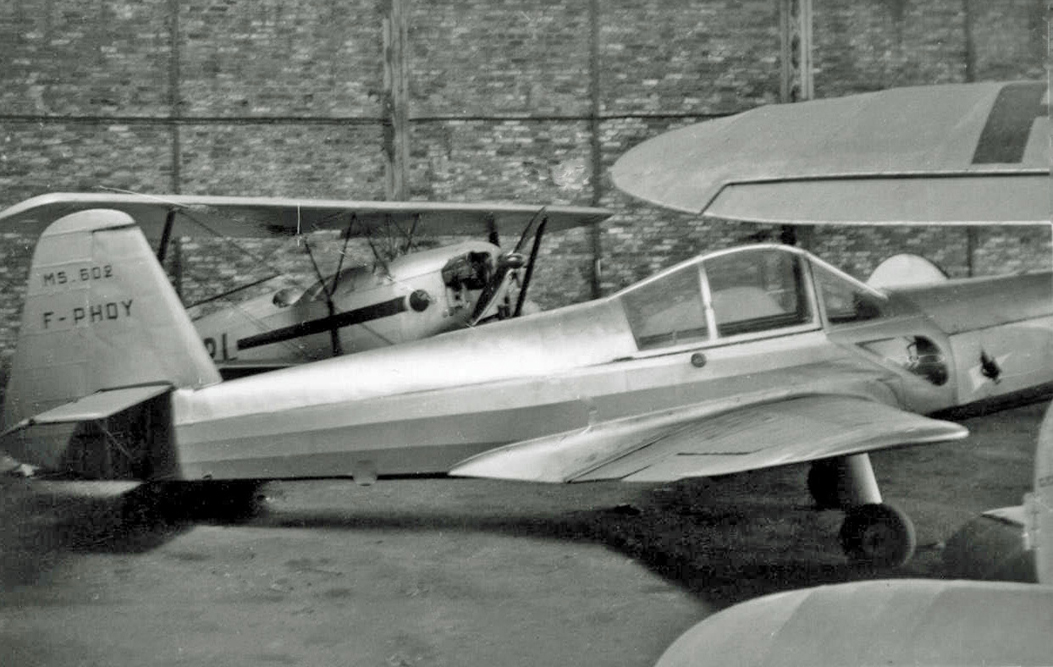
The MS.602 at Saint-Cyr-l'École in 1957

MS.600
The initial prototype powered by a 75 hp (56 kW) Mathis G-4F piston engine. One built.
MS.602
The derivative intended for production. The MS.602 was powered by a 75 hp (56 kW) Minié 4.DA.28 piston engine, but otherwise similar to the MS.600. One built.
MS.603
The final derivative with tricycle undercarriage was powered by a 100 hp (75 kW) Hirth HM 504A-2 engine and had a revised tail unit. One built.

== Specifications (MS.603) ==
Data from Green, 1965

General characteristics

- Crew: 1
- Capacity: 1 passenger
- Length: 7.46 m (24 ft 4 in)
- Wingspan: 9.6 m (31 ft 5 in)
- Height: 2.7 m (8 ft 11 in)
- Wing area: 14.5 m^{2} (156 sq ft)
- Gross weight: 664.5 kg (1,465 lb)
- Powerplant: 1 × Hirth HM 504A-2 four-cylinder piston, 74.6 kW (100 hp)

Performance

- Maximum speed: 190 km/h (118 mph, 103 kn)
- Cruise speed: 162.5 km/h (101 mph, 88 kn)
