= Morane-Saulnier Vanneau =

Vanneau
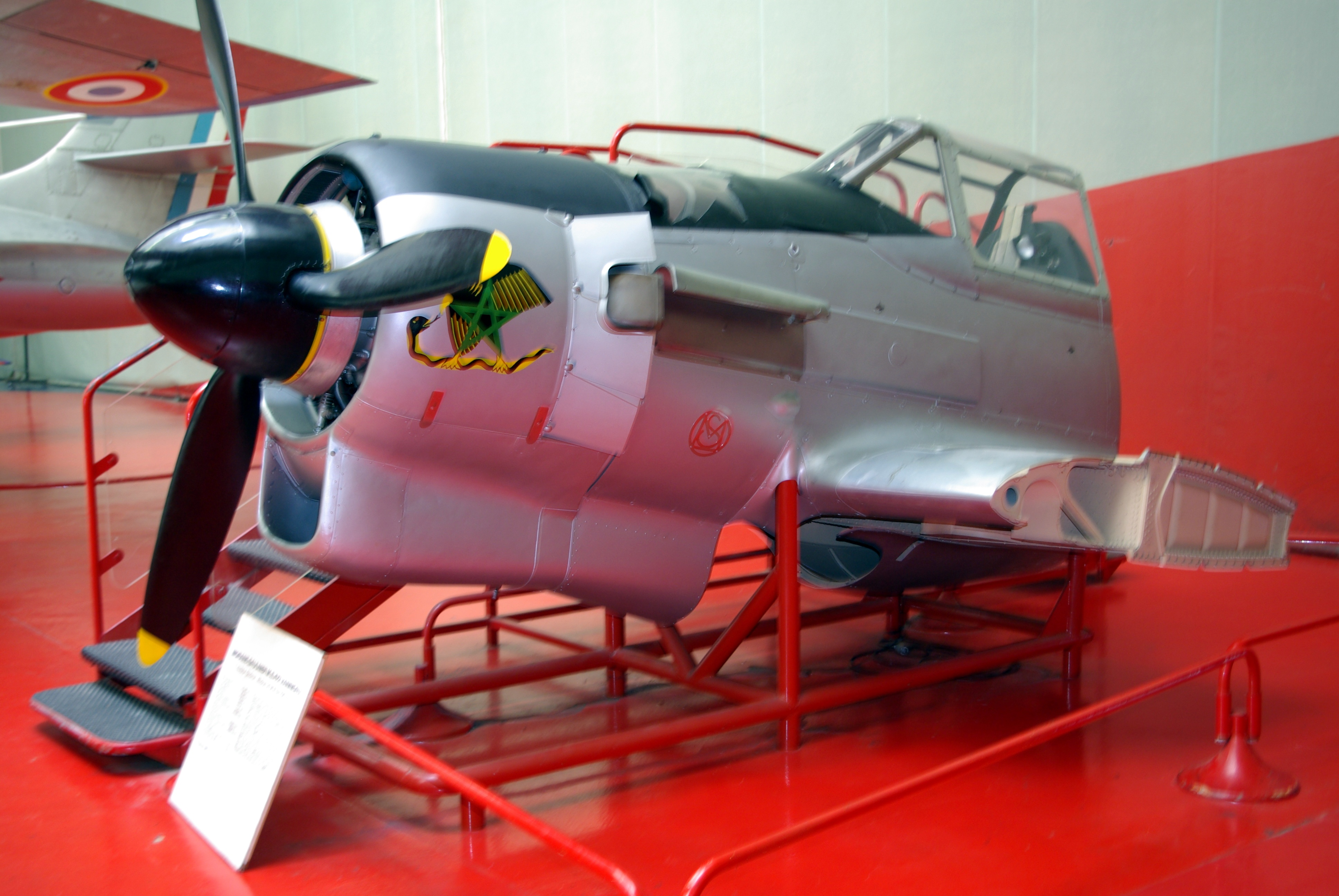

General information
- Type: Two-seat basic trainer
- National origin: France
- Manufacturer: Morane-Saulnier
- Primary user: French Air Force
- Number built: 506

History
- Introduction date: 1946
- First flight: 1944

The Morane-Saulnier Vanneau (en: plover) is a two-seat basic trainer built in France by Morane-Saulnier and ordered by the French Air Force.

== Development ==
Designed in Vichy France the MS.470 prototype first flew on 22 December 1944, successful testing leading to an order from the French Air Force of a revised variant the MS.472. The Vanneau was a low-wing cantilever monoplane with a pilot and student in tandem under a long glazed canopy. It had a retractable tailwheel landing gear and the prototype was powered by a 515 kW (690 hp) Hispano-Suiza 12X inline engine.

The production MS.472 was powered by a 425 kW (570 hp) Gnome-Rhône 14M-05 14-cylinder radial engine and first flew on 12 December 1945, with deliveries to the French Air Force starting in December 1946. From December 1947 the French Navy received 70 of the MS.474 variant modified for carrier operations.

A re-engined version the MS.475 was produced from 1950 which had minor differences but was powered by a 641 kW (860 hp) Hispano-Suiza 12Y-45 V-12 engine. One MS.475 was modified as the MS.476 with an increase in wing surface area and another MS.475 was fitted with a Renault 12S-02 engine as the MS.477 in 1950. A proposed variant was the MS.478 which was to be fitted with an Isotta Fraschini Delta engine but was not built. One MS.472 was re-engined with a 611 kW (820 hp) SNECMA 14X-04 radial engine in 1952 but development was later stopped. The Vanneau remained in service with the French Air Force and Navy into the late 1960s.

== Variants ==
MS.470
Prototype powered by a 515 kW (690 hp) Hispano-Suiza 12X inline engine, one built.
MS.471
Proposed variant powered by a Béarn 12B.
MS.472 Vanneau II
Production variant for the French Air Force powered by a 425 kW (570 hp) Gnome-Rhône 14M-05 piston engine; three prototypes and 230 production aircraft built.
MS.474 Vanneau IV
Carrier-capable production variant for the French Navy, powered by a Gnome-Rhône 14M-04; 70 built.
MS.475 Vanneau V
Improved version for the French Air Force powered by a 641 kW (860 hp) Hispano-Suiza 12Y-45 V12 engine; 201 built.
MS.476
One MS.475 modified with increased wing surface.
MS.477
One MS.475 powered by a 433 kW (580 hp) Renault 12S-02 inline engine.
MS.478
Projected Isotta Fraschini Delta inline powered variant, not built.
MS.479
Developed variant powered by a 611 kW (820 hp) SNECMA 14X-04 radial; one converted from a MS.472.

== Operators ==
France

- French Air Force
- French Navy

== Specifications (MS.475 Vanneau V) ==
Data from

General characteristics

- Crew: 2
- Length: 9.05 m (29 ft 8.25 in)
- Wingspan: 10.65 m (34 ft 11.25 in)
- Height: 3.62 m (11 ft 10.5 in)
- Wing area: 17.30 m^{2} (186.22 sq ft)
- Empty weight: 2,351 kg (5,183 lb)
- Gross weight: 3,125 kg (6,889 lb)
- Powerplant: 1 × Hispano-Suiza 12Y-45 V-12 piston engine , 641 kW (860 hp)

Performance

- Maximum speed: 445 km/h (277 mph, 241 kn)
- Range: 1,500 km (932 mi, 810 nmi)
- Service ceiling: 8,500 m (27,885 ft)

Armament

- 2 x MAC 1934 7.5 mm (0.295 in) wing-mounted machine-guns
- 2 x racks for light bombs

== See also ==
Related lists

- List of military aircraft of France
