= MSL Aero H80 =

French ultralight aircraft

H80

General information
- Type: Ultralight aircraft
- National origin: France
- Manufacturer: MSL Aero
- Designer: Massimo Tedesco and Sebastian Lefebre
- Status: Production completed

The MSL Aero H80 is a French ultralight aircraft that was designed by Massimo Tedesco and Sebastian Lefebre and produced by MSL Aero of Limoges-Fourches. The company seems to have gone out of business in early 2015 and production ended.

== Design and development ==
The aircraft was designed to comply with the Fédération Aéronautique Internationale microlight rules. It features a strut-braced high-wing, a two-seats-in-side-by-side configuration enclosed cockpit, fixed tricycle landing gear and a single engine in tractor configuration.

The aircraft is made from sheet aluminum. Its 8.60 m (28.2 ft) span wing has an area of 10.6 m^{2} (114 sq ft) and flaps. The wing is supported by V-struts and jury struts. Standard engines available are the 80 hp (60 kW) Rotax 912UL and the 100 hp (75 kW) Rotax 912ULS four-stroke powerplants.

== Variants ==
H80
Version with the 80 hp (60 kW) Rotax 912UL engine.
H100
Version with the 100 hp (75 kW) Rotax 912ULS engine.
H2O
Floatplane version.
Type H
Version for the European ELA-1 category.

== Specifications (H80) ==
Data from Bayerl and Tacke

General characteristics

- Crew: one
- Capacity: one passenger
- Wingspan: 8.60 m (28 ft 3 in)
- Wing area: 10.6 m^{2} (114 sq ft)
- Empty weight: 280 kg (617 lb)
- Gross weight: 472.5 kg (1,042 lb)
- Fuel capacity: 87 litres (19 imp gal; 23 US gal)
- Powerplant: 1 × Rotax 912UL four cylinder, liquid and air-cooled, four stroke aircraft engine, 60 kW (80 hp)

Performance

- Maximum speed: 210 km/h (130 mph, 110 kn)
- Cruise speed: 195 km/h (121 mph, 105 kn)
- Stall speed: 58 km/h (36 mph, 31 kn)
- Rate of climb: 5.6 m/s (1,100 ft/min)
- Wing loading: 44.6 kg/m^{2} (9.1 lb/sq ft)
