= MSW Votec 322 =

Swiss two-seat low-wing monoplane

Votec 322
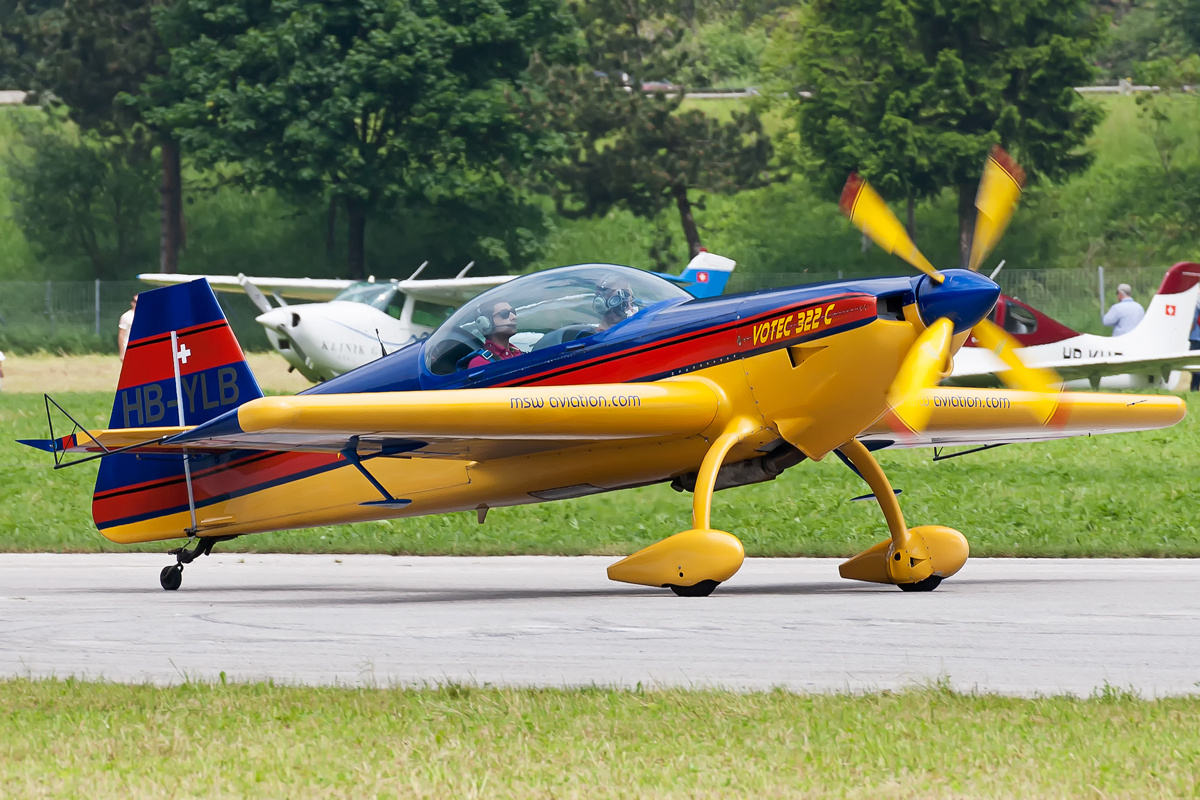
- Votec 322C landing in Ambri at the Oris Fly-In 2013.

General information
- Type: Two-seat homebuilt sportplane
- National origin: Switzerland
- Manufacturer: MSW Aviation
- Designer: Max Vogelsang

History
- First flight: 6 April 2001
- Developed from: Rihn DR-107 One Design
- Developed into: Votec 252T

The MSW Votec 322 is a Swiss two-seat low-wing monoplane based on the Rihn DR-107 One Design and designed for amateur construction by MSW Aviation of Wohlen.

== Design and development ==
The MSW 322 was designed by Max Vogelsang and derived from the Rihn DR-107 One Design which MSW Aviation bought. The first prototype, registered HB-YJY first flew on 6 April 2001. The Votec 322 is a low-wing cantilever monoplane with a steel-tube fuselage, wooden wings with a carbon fibre fuselage skin, and conventional landing gear with a steerable tailwheel. The aircraft is powered by a 330 hp (246 kW) Lycoming AEIO-540 flat-six piston engine driving a three-bladed tractor propeller. Later a four-bladed propeller was installed to reduce noise. The cockpit has room for two in tandem with a one-piece side-hinged canopy.

In 2006 the eighth Votec 322 was converted into the first and, as of October 2011, the only Votec 351, a single seater. This flew for the first time on 23 September 2006. It has the same external dimensions as the Votec 322 but is 50 kg (110 lb) lighter when empty and has the more powerful 261 kW (350 hp) Lycoming AEIO-580 flat six engine. One consequence is an improvement in the climb rate of about 0.3%.

The Votec 452T, another Votec 322 variant, first flew on 4 June 2010. It is similar to its predecessor in span and weight but has a 336 kW (451 hp) Rolls-Royce M250-B17D turboprop engine and is 700 mm (27 1/2 in) longer. The prototype remains the only example in October 2011.

== Operational history ==
In mid 2010 six Votec 322 aircraft appeared on the European civil registers, together with the lone 351 and the 452T.

== Variants ==
Votec 322
Original tandem seat DR 107 One Design derivative.
Votec 351
Single-seat, higher-power version.
Votec 452T
Turboprop-powered, tandem-seat version.

== Specifications (Votec 322) ==
Data from Jane's All the World's Aircraft 1989-90

General characteristics

- Crew: 1
- Capacity: 1 passenger
- Length: 6.50 m (21 ft 4 in)
- Wingspan: 7.30 m (23 ft 11.5 in)
- Height: 2.50 m (8 ft 2.5 in)
- Empty weight: 630 kg (1,389 lb)
- Gross weight: 950 kg (2,094 lb)
- Powerplant: 1 × Lycoming AEIO-540 flat-six , 246 kW (330 hp)

Performance

- Maximum speed: 418 km/h (260 mph, 230 kn)
- Cruise speed: 322 km/h (200 mph, 170 kn)
- Stall speed: 105 km/h (65 mph, 56 kn)
- Endurance: 3 hours 0 minutes
- g limits: ±10
- Roll rate: 420°/s
- Rate of climb: 17.8 m/s (3,500 ft/min)
