= Morane-Saulnier AC =

French WW1 fighter aircraft

Type AC
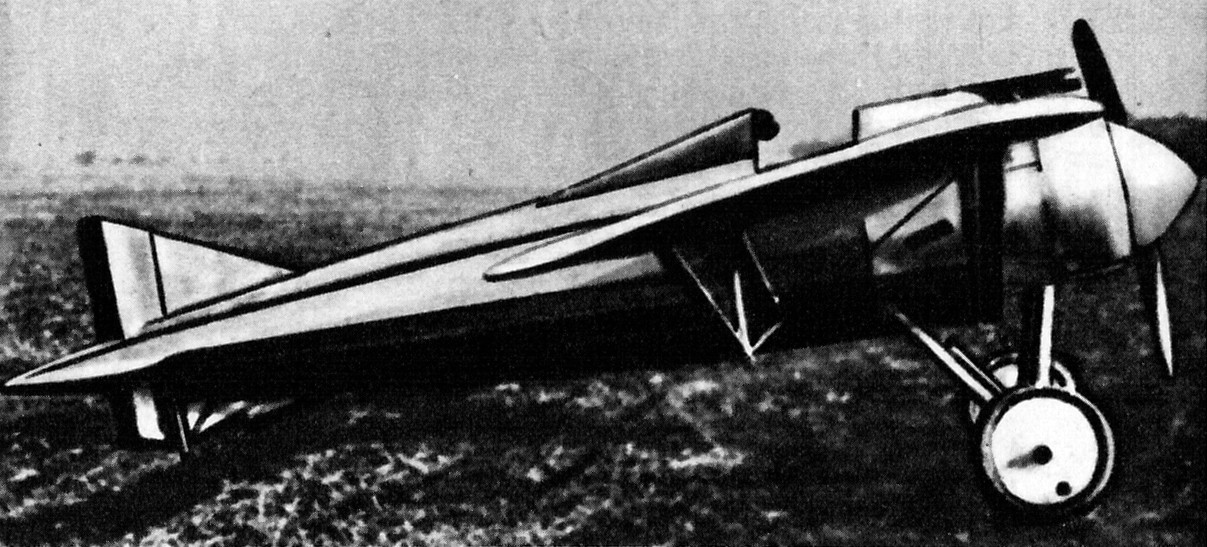

General information
- Type: Fighter
- National origin: France
- Manufacturer: Morane-Saulnier
- Primary user: Armée de l'Air
- Number built: 32

History
- Introduction date: late 1916
- Retired: soon after

The Morane-Saulnier AC, also known as Morane-Saulnier Type AC and MoS 23, was a French fighter of the 1910s.

== Development ==
The AC was conceived in mid-1916, being derived from the Type N via the unbuilt Type U. It differed from earlier single-seat Morane-Saulnier aircraft in that it had ailerons for lateral control rather than wing warping, and because of its rigid wing bracing, with a wire braced truss of steel tubes supporting the wings from below. It appeared in autumn of that year, and was found to be aerodynamically clean.

== Operational history ==
The AC's first flight is unrecorded, however it is assumed that it was late summer 1916. After initial testing thirty aircraft were ordered for the Aviation Militaire. Although of advanced design and good performance, the AC was considered inferior to the SPAD S.VII and therefore was not adopted in quantity. Two examples were provided to the Royal Flying Corps for evaluation.

== Operators ==
France

- Armée de l'Air

United Kingdom

- Royal Flying Corps

== Specifications ==
Data from War Planes of the First World War:Volume Five Fighters

General characteristics

- Crew: 1
- Length: 7.05 m (23 ft 1.5 in)
- Wingspan: 9.80 m (32 ft 1.63 in)
- Height: 2.73 m (8 ft 11.5 in)
- Wing area: 15.00 m^{2} (161.46 sq ft)
- Empty weight: 435 kg (957 lb)
- Gross weight: 658 kg (1,448 lb)
- Powerplant: 1 × Le Rhône 9J or Le Rhône 9Jb nine-cylinder air-cooled rotary engine , 82 kW (110 hp)

Performance

- Maximum speed: 178 km/h (111 mph, 96 kn)
- Endurance: 2 hours 30 minutes
- Service ceiling: 5,600 m (18,370 ft)
- Rate of climb: 5.6 m/s (1,100 ft/min)

Armament

- 1 x 7.7mm synchronised Vickers machine gun
