= Mooney M22 Mustang =

Type of aircraft

M22 Mustang
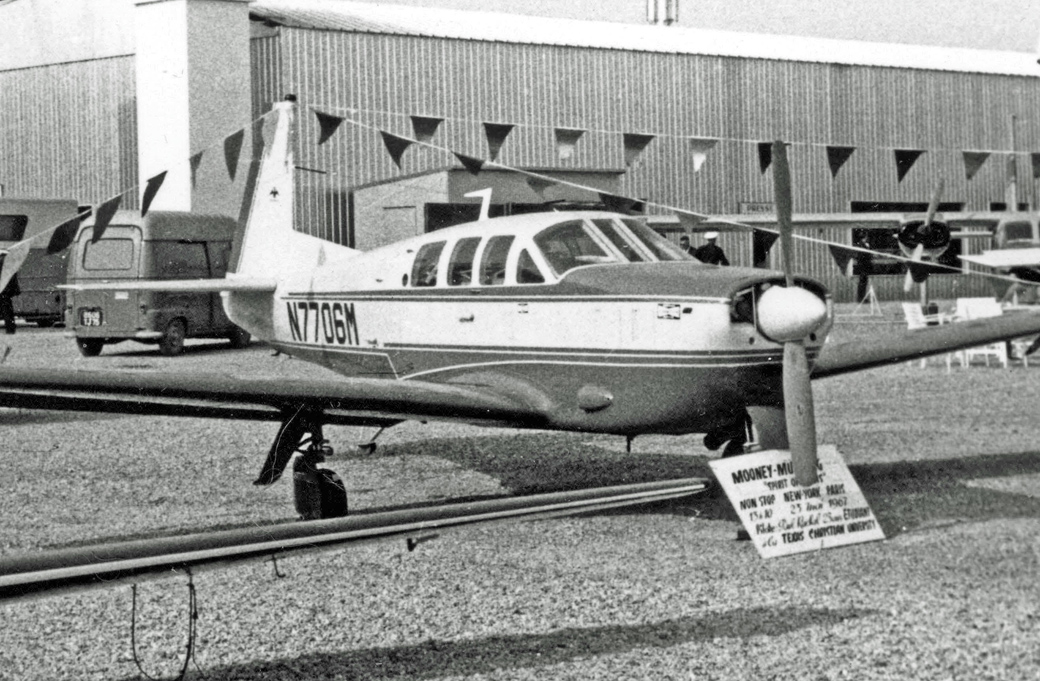
- The second Mooney M22 Mustang displayed at the Paris Air Show in June 1967 after flying nonstop from New York in 13 hours 10 minutes

General information
- Type: Light aircraft
- National origin: United States of America
- Manufacturer: Mooney Aircraft Company
- Number built: 36

History
- Manufactured: 1965-1970
- First flight: September 24, 1964
- Developed from: Mooney M20

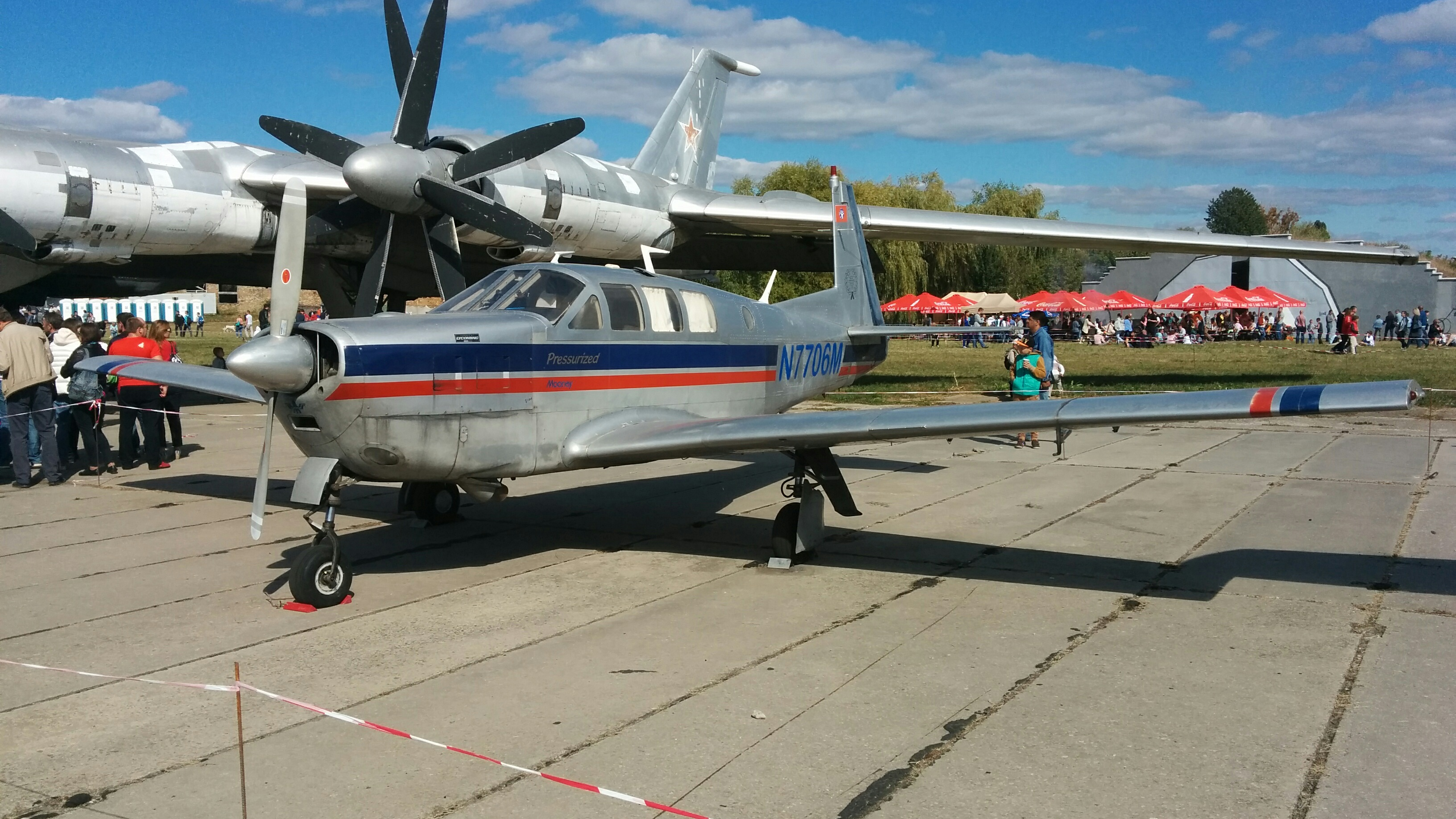
Mooney M22 Mustang N7706M displayed at the State Air Museum, Kyiv, Ukraine on September 18, 2016

The Mooney M22 Mustang is the first attempt at a pressurized single engine aircraft by the Mooney Aircraft Company of the United States.

== Development ==
The Mustang was developed to be a top-of-the-line model to supplement Mooney's successful Mooney M20 high-performance light aircraft. It is a five-seat pressurized single-engined aircraft with a wider and longer fuselage than the M20E Super 21 and a taller fin and leading edge fillet. It is a low-winged monoplane with a retractable nosewheel undercarriage, with a similar wing to that used on Mooney's earlier M20 Ranger.

The first prototype flew on September 24, 1964, with the type being certified on September 26, 1966. First deliveries commenced in 1965, continuing until 1970. 36 aircraft were completed before the line was closed. It was produced and sold at a loss, which contributed to the bankruptcy of Mooney.

Mooney initially called the aircraft the "Mustang", but the company was sued by Cavalier Aircraft for trademark infringement. After losing the suit, it was renamed the "Mark 22". The "Mark 22" name had previously been applied to a 1957 Mooney M20 experimental aircraft built with twin engines, a nose cone, and an enlarged tail surface. That aircraft did not go into production.

== Operational history ==
The Model 22, although produced in fairly small numbers, has been operated by private and commercial owners in several countries including the United States and Australia. Its Garrett AiResearch cabin pressurization system gives the equivalent of 11,000 feet (3,400 m) at the aircraft's operational ceiling of 24,000 feet (7,300 m). As a demonstration of its high performance, the second production aircraft was flown non-stop from New York to the Paris Air Show in June 1967, the flight taking 13 hours 10 minutes. The achievement is recorded on the display board in the accompanying photograph. The aircraft had been fitted with an extra fuel tank for the flight. In 2001, 24 aircraft remained in service.

== Specifications (M22) ==
Data from Jane's All The World's Aircraft 1969-70

General characteristics

- Crew: 1
- Capacity: 4 passengers
- Length: 27 ft 0 in (8.23 m)
- Wingspan: 35 ft 0 in (10.67 m)
- Height: 9 ft 10 in (3.00 m)
- Wing area: 166.9 sq ft (15.51 m^{2})
- Aspect ratio: 7.338:1
- Airfoil: NACA 63_{2}-215 at root, 64_{1}-412 at tip
- Empty weight: 2,440 lb (1,107 kg)
- Max takeoff weight: 3,680 lb (1,669 kg)
- Fuel capacity: 92 US gal (77 imp gal; 350 L)
- Powerplant: 1 × Lycoming TIO-541-A1A air-cooled turbo-supercharged six-cylinder horizontally opposed engine, 310 hp (230 kW)
- Propellers: 2-bladed Hartzell metal constant-speed propeller, 6 ft 8 in (2.03 m) diameter

Performance

- Maximum speed: 256 mph (412 km/h, 222 kn)
- Cruise speed: 214 mph (344 km/h, 186 kn) (normal cruise - 65% power)
- Stall speed: 67 mph (108 km/h, 58 kn) (Indicated airspeed) - flaps and undercarriage lowered, power off
- Range: 1,493 mi (2,403 km, 1,297 nmi) (45 minutes reserves)
- Service ceiling: 24,000 ft (7,300 m)
- Rate of climb: 1,125 ft/min (5.72 m/s)
- Take-off run: 1,142 ft (348 m)
- Landing run: 958 ft (292 m)
