= Mooney M10 Cadet =

Airplane

M10
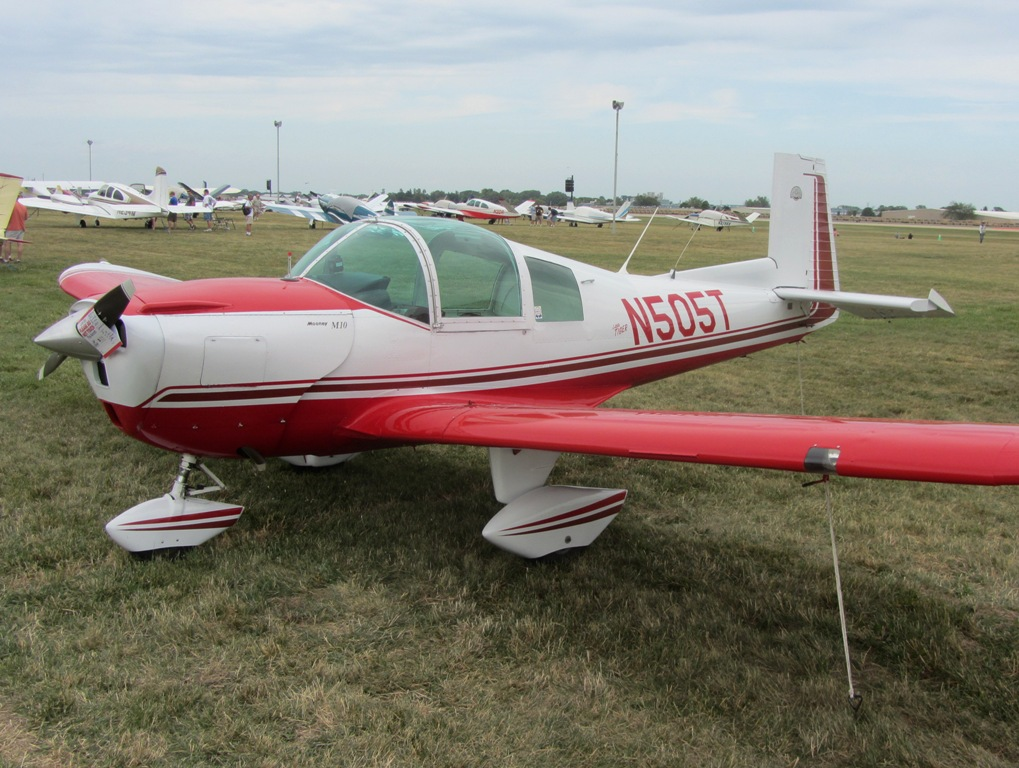
- 1970 Mooney M10

General information
- Type: Single-engine trainer
- Manufacturer: Mooney
- Designer: Mooney
- Number built: 59

History
- First flight: 23 February 1968
- Developed from: ERCO Ercoupe

The Mooney M10 Cadet is a light airplane manufactured by the Mooney Aircraft Company in 1969 and 1970. The M10 is derived from the ERCO Ercoupe, the type certificates for which Mooney purchased from the Alon Corporation in 1967.

== Design ==
The M10 is similar to the Alon A2-A, and indeed a handful of "Mooney A2-As" were built in Kerrville in 1968 before changeover of Mooney's production line was completed. According to the FAA Type Certificate Data Sheet, the "Model 10 is similar to Model A2-A except for new design empennage, ailerons and fuel tank vent." The most obvious difference is that the M10 replaces the iconic Ercoupe-style dual vertical stabilizer with a tail designed to allow the airplane to spin. Changes to the ailerons, along with replacement of the A2-A's tail, were motivated by Mooney's intent to market the M10 as a trainer: student pilots receiving training in a non-spinnable airplane, as the Ercoupe was, were issued FAA pilot certificates carrying the restriction that they could only fly airplanes which were "characteristically incapable of spinning"; thus the spinnable tail was necessary to turn the A2-A into a general-purpose trainer. Given that they were replacing the tail, Mooney's engineers opted to give it the "backward" profile characteristic of the M20 series. Although the M10's empennage has the same silhouette as the "big Mooneys", it does not swivel the way the M20's does; the Cadet's tail is a conventional design with fixed horizontal stabilizer, hinged elevator, and trim tabs.

The two type certificates that cover all Ercoupe variants, including the Mooney M10, are currently owned by Univair Aircraft Corporation, in Aurora, Colorado, USA.

== Specifications ==
Data from Jane's All the World's Aircraft 1969–70

General characteristics

- Crew: Two
- Length: 20 ft 8 in (6.30 m)
- Wingspan: 30 ft 0 in (9.14 m)
- Height: 7 ft 8 in (2.34 m)
- Wing area: 142.6 sq ft (13.25 m^{2})
- Aspect ratio: 6.31:1
- Airfoil: NACA 43013
- Empty weight: 950 lb (431 kg)
- Max takeoff weight: 1,450 lb (658 kg)
- Fuel capacity: 24 US gal (20 imp gal; 91 L)
- Powerplant: 1 × Continental C-90-16F air-cooled flat-four engine, 90 hp (67 kW)
- Propellers: 2-bladed McCauley 7153 metal fixed-pitch propeller, 5 ft 11 in (1.80 m) diameter

Performance

- Maximum speed: 103 kn (118 mph, 190 km/h)
- Stall speed: 40 kn (46 mph, 74 km/h) IAS
- Never exceed speed: 125 kn (144 mph, 232 km/h) IAS
- Range: 486 nmi (559 mi, 895 km)
- Service ceiling: 15,500 ft (4,700 m)
- Rate of climb: 835 ft/min (4.24 m/s)

== See also ==
- Mooney M10T
