= Mooney TX-1 =

TX-1

General information
- Type: Training aircraft
- National origin: United States of America
- Manufacturer: Mooney Aircraft Company
- Number built: 1

History
- First flight: 1982
- Developed from: Mooney M20

The Mooney TX-1 or Mooney MT-20 was a prototype American military basic training aircraft of the 1980s. It was a two-seat derivative of Mooney's popular M20 light aircraft, but was unsuccessful, only a single example being built.

== Design and development ==
In late 1982 the Mooney Aircraft Company of Kerrville, Texas flew a prototype of a two-seat military trainer aircraft, the Mooney TX-1. This was based on its popular Mooney M20J four seat light aircraft, but with side-by-side seating for pilot and instructor under a sliding canopy. It was an all-metal low-winged monoplane with retractable tricycle landing gear powered by a single Continental TSIO-360 piston engine driving a two-blade propeller. The TX-1 was aimed at the basic trainer market, also being suitable for weapons training and light attack missions, and so was fitted with four hardpoints under the wing.

Mooney stated that they needed orders for 100 aircraft to launch production of the TX-1, but these did not occur, and no production followed. The prototype's aircraft registration was canceled in 1989.

== Specifications ==
Data from Airdata File: Mooney TX-1

General characteristics

- Crew: 2
- Length: 25 ft 5 in (7.75 m)
- Wingspan: 36 ft 1 in (11.00 m)
- Height: 8 ft 4 in (2.54 m)
- Wing area: 174.79 sq ft (16.239 m^{2})
- Empty weight: 1,800 lb (816 kg)
- Max takeoff weight: 2,900 lb (1,315 kg)
- Fuel capacity: 73 US Gallons (276 L)
- Powerplant: 1 × Continental TSIO-360-GB turbosupercharged flat-six, 240 hp (180 kW) (take-off power)

Performance

- Maximum speed: 239 mph (385 km/h, 208 kn) at 16,000 ft (4,880 m)
- Cruise speed: 185 mph (298 km/h, 161 kn) at sea level
- Range: 940 mi (1,513 km, 817 nmi) at 55% power, no reserves
- Rate of climb: 1,336 ft/min (6.79 m/s)
- Ceiling: Over 30,000 ft (6,100 m)

Armament

- Hardpoints: 4 with a capacity of 1,000 lb (450 kg) total

== See also ==
Related development

- Mooney M20

Aircraft of comparable role, configuration, and era

- SIAI-Marchetti SF.260
