= Mooney M10T =

M10T

General information
- Type: Light aircraft
- Manufacturer: Mooney Aircraft
- Status: Canceled
- Number built: One prototype M10T

History
- Introduction date: 11 November 2014
- First flight: 23 December 2015 (proof of concept aircraft)

The Mooney M10T is a light aircraft that was under development by Mooney Aircraft with an original proposed delivery date in 2017. The project was cancelled in April 2017.

The first flight of the proof of concept prototype was on 23 December 2015.

== Design and development ==
The M10T is a three-seat, single engine, low-wing, tricycle gear composite aircraft, that was originally proposed as a new training aircraft. Although similar in configuration to the Ercoupe-based Mooney M10, the aircraft is an all-new design of composite construction with sidestick controls. The M10J is a parallel development, with a larger 155 hp (116 kW) engine and retractable landing gear.

The company planned to produce the design at its Chino, California plant initially, with the option of expanding to its Kerrville, Texas facility. Assembly was also considered for a new plant under construction in Hunan province, China.

In April 2017 the company indicated that development was canceled, but that their next-generation piston aircraft would use the knowledge they gained during the project.

== Variants ==
M10T
Fixed gear trainer with Continental CD-135 diesel engine. One prototype built.
M10J
Retractable gear version with Continental CD-155 diesel engine. None completed.

== Specifications (M10T) ==
Data from AOPA

General characteristics

- Crew: 1
- Capacity: 2 passenger
- Fuel capacity: 42 U.S. gallons (160 L; 35 imp gal)
- Powerplant: 1 × Continental CD-135 four cylinder diesel, 135 hp (101 kW)
- Propellers: 3-bladed composite

Performance

- Cruise speed: 140 kn (160 mph, 260 km/h)
- Never exceed speed: 160 kn (180 mph, 300 km/h)

Avionics

- Garmin G1000
