= Mooney International Corporation =

American aircraft manufacturer

- Formerly: Mooney Aircraft Company; Mooney Aviation Company
- Type: Privately held company
- Industry: General aviation
- Founded: 1929
- Founders: Albert Mooney; Arthur Mooney
- Headquarters: Kerrville, Texas, United States
- Key people: Jonny Pollack (CEO); Roy LoPresti; Ralph Harmon
- Owner: US Financial, LLC
- Parent: American Electronics Laboratories (1969); Butler Aviation International (1969–1973); Republic Steel (1973–1984); LTV (1984); Morrison Group (1984); Advanced Aerodynamics and Structures Inc. (2002–2004); Allen Holding Finance (2004); Mooney Aerospace Group (2004–2013); Soaring America Corporation (2013–2020)
- Website: www.mooney.com

The Mooney International Corporation (formerly Mooney Aviation Company, Inc., the Mooney Aircraft Corporation, and the Aerostar Aircraft Corporation) is an American aircraft manufacturer based in Kerrville, Texas, United States. It manufactures single-engined piston-powered general aviation aircraft.

Through its history the company has had many American owners and subsequent bankruptcies. Mooney International was purchased in 2013 by a Chinese private equity, real-estate development company, the Meijing Group, which ran it until 2020, when it was purchased by a group of Mooney aircraft owners under US Financial, LLC of Wyoming.

Among Mooney's achievements are: the first pressurized single-engined, piston-powered aircraft, the M22 Mustang; production of the fastest civilian single-engine piston-powered aircraft in the world, the M20TN Acclaim Type S; the first production aircraft to achieve 201 mph (323 km/h) on 200 hp (150 kW), the M20J 201; and the fastest transcontinental flight in a single-engine piston-powered production aircraft, the M20K 231.

Many Mooney aircraft have the signature vertical stabilizer with its vertical leading edge and swept trailing edge that gives the illusion of being forward-swept.

== History ==
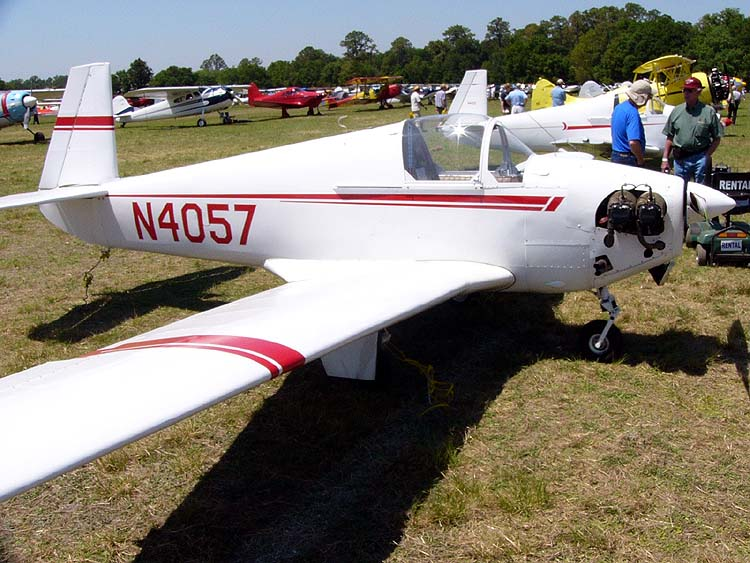
A Mooney M-18C Mite

The company was founded in 1929 by Albert Mooney and his brother Arthur.

Albert Mooney had his first job in aviation at the age of 19 in 1925 when he worked briefly for Alexander Aircraft Company in Denver. He worked for the Marshall/Montague Monoplane Company in Marshall, Missouri, in 1926, but the company had financial difficulties, and Al soon returned to Alexander, where he designed the Alexander Bullet. He was joined by his brother Arthur, known as Art. Early in 1929 Al was invited to meet with some financial backers in Wichita, Kansas, and the Mooney Aircraft Corporation was established with financial backing from the Bridgeport Machine Company. The company owned an airfield and some buildings which could be used to design and build aircraft. Seven months later, Albert's M-5 airplane was test-flown. Due to the Great Depression, the Mooney Aircraft Corporation went bankrupt in 1930. The Mooney brothers worked for other aircraft companies, including the Culver Aircraft Company, from then through World War II. On June 18, 1948, Albert started Mooney Aircraft Incorporated in Wichita, along with Charles Yankey, Art Mooney and W. L. McMahon.

The first aircraft produced by the new Mooney company was the small single-seat Mooney Mite M-18. It was designed to appeal to the thousands of fighter pilots leaving military service. Some thought the Mooney Mite looked so much like the Messerschmitt Bf 109 that they called it the "Texas Messerschmitt". The Mite was produced into the early 1950s and established some of the design concepts still used by Mooney today.

Al Mooney had been developing the designs for a four-seater plane for some time while the Mite was in production. In early 1953, the company moved to Kerrville, Texas, and when it became clear that the Mite was nearing the end of its production, the development of the new plane was accelerated. The first M20 flight took place on September 3, 1953. Charles Yankey had been the primary financial backer since he helped Al establish the company in 1948, and when he visited Kerrville for a ride in the new airplane, he was pleased with the project and began to develop the financial plans necessary to put the plane into production.

Later that year, before Yankey transferred the funds from Wichita to Kerrville, he suffered a severe stroke, and he died in December 1953. None of Yankey's heirs had any interest in the aviation business, and although he had left his company stock to the two Mooney brothers, that stock had little value without further investment. The company was on the point of declaring bankruptcy when two investors, Hal Rachal and Norm Hoffman of Midland, Texas, decided to step in and save the company. The M20 was certified in September 1955. Shortly thereafter, Albert Mooney left the company and went to work for the Lockheed Aircraft Corporation in Marietta, Georgia. His brother Art joined him there, and both remained with Lockheed until retirement.

During 1955, Mooney sold 10 of the M20 airplanes. Due to start-up costs, they lost $3000 (equivalent to $36,100 in 2025) on each one. Production increased, and they delivered 51 in 1956 and 105 in 1957. The M20 gained attention because it was able to achieve speeds of up to 170 miles per hour (270 km/h) with a 150 hp (110 kW) Lycoming O-320 engine. The combination of speed and efficiency was noteworthy. In 1958 the M20A joined the lineup with a larger 180 hp (130 kW) Lycoming O-360-A1A engine, and by 1959 this was the only model offered, with a total sales that year of 231 units. This was the first year the company made a profit. The M20A continued production into 1960 when 166 were delivered. These were the last of the Mooneys to have wooden structures in the wings and tail.

=== 1960s ===
Since Al Mooney's departure, John W. Taylor had been the chief engineer. In January 1960, the Mooney company convinced Ralph Harmon to leave McDonnell Aircraft and take over management of the engineering efforts. He had previously worked for Beech Aircraft where he headed the design of the Beechcraft Model 35, one of the first all-metal general aviation monoplanes. He later worked on the larger Cessna 620 and McDonnell Model C119, but his interests lay with small aircraft, and he accepted Mooney's offer. He insisted on replacing the wood in the M20 with aluminum, and the all-metal M20B was completed by the end of 1960, less than a year after his arrival. In 1961 the company sold 222 M20Bs. The following year the M20C, a refined version of the M20B, was introduced; 336 were sold that year.

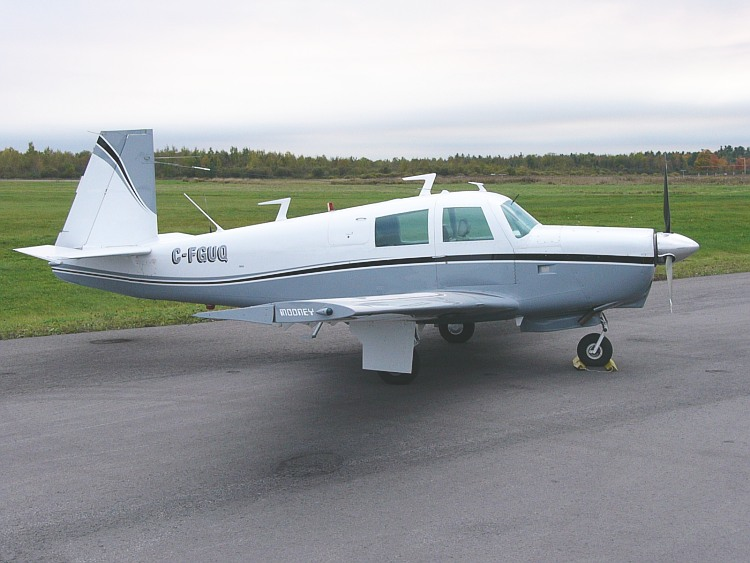
A Mooney M20C

Rachal, Hoffman, and Harmon were not experienced at running an aircraft factory, but saw the need to expand the product line and add dealers, and pushed ahead. In 1963 they introduced the M20D, essentially an M20C with fixed landing gear and a fixed-pitch propeller. This had a slightly lower price than the M20C and was intended as a basic or trainer model which would have lower insurance costs. It could be upgraded with retractable landing gear, and in fact most of them were upgraded over the years. The M20D was produced from 1963 to 1966 with a total production of 141 units. 1964 saw the introduction of the M20E Super 21, based on the M20C but with a more powerful 200 hp (150 kW) fuel-injected Lycoming engine. The company sold 366 M20Es that year.

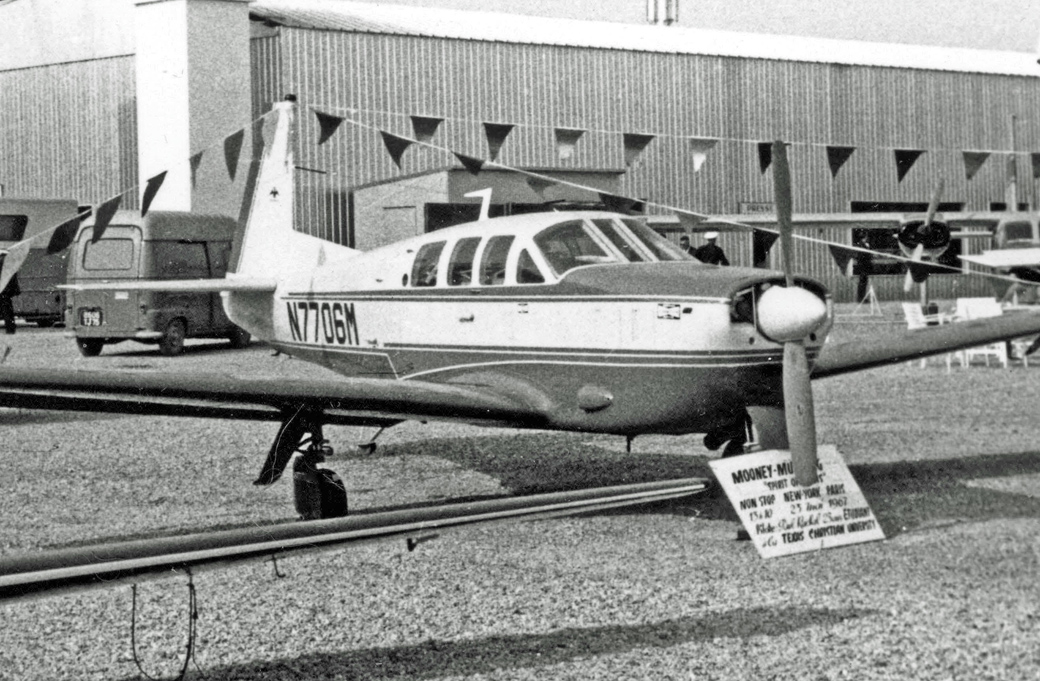
A Mooney M22 Mustang

To supplement the M20 line, Mooney began development of a high-performance pressurized single, the M22 Mustang. It first flew in September 1965 and was certified two years later. The project was ultimately unsuccessful. Sources disagree on the total production, some saying 36 units, others 32, 29 or 27. What is certain is that each plane was a financial loss for the company. It was reported as having a heavy control response and poor visibility, although it did fly high and fast. The name also could have caused problems, since Cavalier Aircraft had been modifying surplus North American P-51 Mustangs for civilian use and wrote a letter to Mooney asking them not to use the name "Mustang". The letter was ignored and Cavalier filed suit, but by that time the M22 line was nearing its end and the Mustang name had been dropped.

During several years in the early 1960s, Mooney had discussions with Mitsubishi Motors regarding their MU-2. An agreement between the companies was reached in mid-1964: the MU-2 would be fabricated in Japan but assembled by Mooney in the United States. The existing Kerrville facility and workforce was insufficient, so Mooney purchased 230 acres (93 ha) near the airport in San Angelo, Texas, (125 miles (201 km) to the northeast of Kerrville), set up an assembly line in an existing hangar, and built new support facilities. The MU-2 sold slowly, partly because the same sales force that was selling the M20 line was also trying to sell the much more expensive MU-2. It cost about $400,000 (equivalent to $4,152,000 in 2025), and marketing and selling such an airplane was different than selling a small four-seater. The company's management was also overstretched.

In 1967, Mooney acquired production rights to the Aircoupe from Alon Aircraft Company. Owners John Allen and Lee Higdon, who had left Beech Aircraft to start their own company, took managerial positions at Mooney. Production began in 1968 with a total of 38 units. That year Allen and Higdon both left Mooney, Allen returning to Beech to assist with the Beechcraft Duke. In 1969 the tail of the plane was updated and it became the M10 Cadet, but only 9 units were sold that year. 50 were built in 1970 before the model was terminated, marking the end of the Aircoupe.

Despite strong sales of the M20, Mooney was short of cash. The development of the M22 Mustang had cost more than expected, and was ultimately unsuccessful. The collaboration with Mitsubishi had come with substantial financial assistance but proved too much for the company to handle. Mooney went into chapter 7 bankruptcy in early 1969; American Electronics Laboratories quickly acquired the company in March of that year and invested $600,000 (equivalent to $5,268,000 in 2025) to keep it operating. Sales that year were less than half of the previous year's figures, although a new model, the M20E Chapparal, was released with electrically-operated flaps and landing gear. AEL was unable to turn the company around, losing nearly a million dollars in just over 9 months, and sold Mooney to Butler Aviation International in December 1969. Butler also acquired the troubled Ted Smith Aircraft Company, maker of the twin-engine Ted Smith Aerostar, and in an attempt to save both companies, it merged them as the Aerostar Aircraft Corporation. The Mooney name was dropped in 1970, as was the M20 designation; the planes were rebranded as Aerostars.

Butler formulated a plan to consolidate aircraft production at the Mooney plant in Kerrville and close the Ted Smith plant in Van Nuys, California, but became mired in a dispute with the American Cement Company, the Ted Smith Aircraft Company's former owner, over alleged corrosion problems with the twin-engine Aerostar. The U.S. Federal Aviation Administration (FAA) investigated and found that no such problem existed, but the dispute resulted in the suspension of production and the cancellation of the plant relocation plan. Meanwhile, aircraft designer and Ted Smith Aircraft Company founder Ted R. Smith began a campaign to buy his design back and restart production.

=== 1970s ===
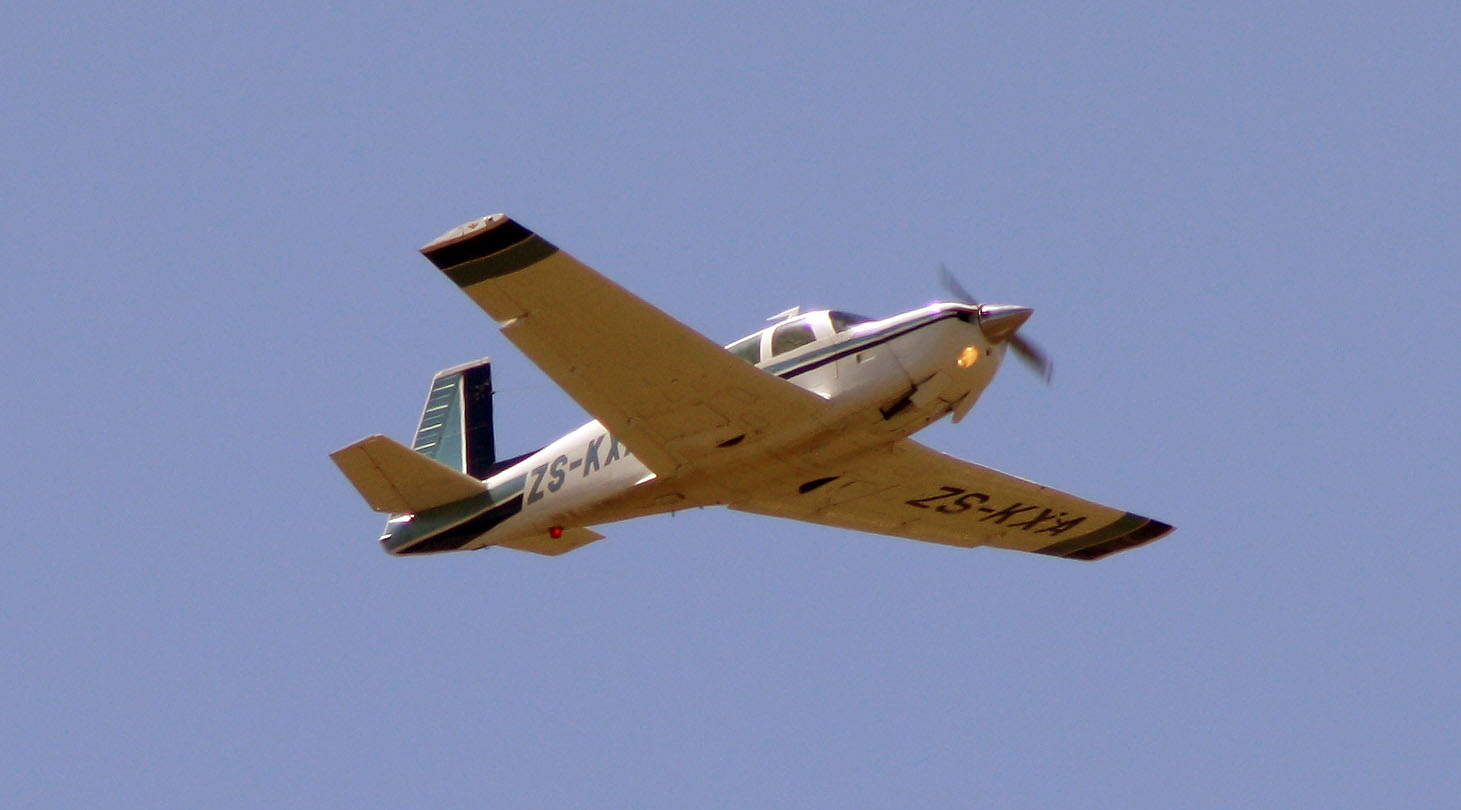
A Mooney M20J

Butler closed the Mooney plant in early 1971 and it remained closed for more than two years. Ted R. Smith and Associates bought back the dormant twin-engine Aerostar line in 1972. In October 1973, Republic Steel Corporation acquired the Mooney aircraft line, renamed the company the Mooney Aircraft Corporation, and resumed production in 1974. Robert Cumming, a general manager at Republic Steel, had owned a Mooney M20F Executive for years and flew it frequently, and wished to put the Mooney M20 back into production. This began in January 1974 with the reintroduction of the M20F Executive. The company continued aggressive product development, working on another pressurized single to compete with the Cessna 210, a turboprop designated the "301". Roy LoPresti, formerly of Grumman Aerospace where he had worked on aircraft design and the Apollo Lunar Module, was hired as chief of research and development to update the M20. The result was the M20J 201, so named because it was capable of 201 miles per hour (323 km/h) with its 200 horsepower (150 kW) engine. In a 1979 interview, LoPresti noted that Mooney did not have the resources to develop radical new composite construction aircraft as did other manufacturers, and would focus on evolutionary development of conventional aircraft.

The 201 was a big seller, and a turbocharged version was developed later that year. The next year, 1977, three models were offered: the M20C Ranger, the M20F Executive, and the M20J 201. By 1979 the M20C had been dropped, ending production of the short-body M20. The same year, the company's first turbocharged M20 was released: the M20K 231, so designated because its top speed was 231 miles per hour (372 km/h). It was based on the earlier 201 with further improvements. This year a total of 439 airplanes were delivered — fewer than the top years of the 1960s, but these deliveries resulted in healthy profits. From this point through 1986, the M20J and the turbocharged M20K were the only two models offered.

=== 1980s ===
General aviation manufacturing experienced a significant downturn starting in 1982. Mooney was affected along with other manufacturers and was forced to downsize through temporary layoffs. Despite the recession, development work continued. The 201 and 231 received more improvements, including significant reductions in cabin noise levels. The newly-developed six-place 301 had its first flight in the spring of 1982. That year deliveries fell to 218 units, and in 1983 only 154 aircraft were produced; but enthusiasm for the new 301 kept expectations high, and another opportunity arose. The United States Air Force announced a competition to develop a replacement for the Cessna T-41 trainer, and Mooney immediately began to develop a military trainer based on the 231.

In 1984, Republic Steel was acquired by the Ling-Temco-Vought corporation, and Mooney was dropped. There were several bids to purchase the company and it was quickly purchased by a group of investors known as the Morrison Group from Minneapolis. Less than two months later it was acquired by the team of Armand Rivard of Lake Aircraft and Alexandre Couvelair, a Mooney dealer from Paris. They had placed a bid when Republic dropped Mooney and were determined to own the company. When president Tom Smith left to join Fairchild Aircraft, Roy LoPresti became president, but he left the following year (1985) to work for Beech Aircraft Corporation. The 301 was put on hold and was never resumed by Mooney; it eventually became the TBM700 and was produced by SOCATA. The focus was once again on the M20 line. Sales continued to fall, totaling 143 in 1984 and 99 in 1985.

Mooney opened a new facility in San Antonio, in 1989. In February of that year, the next M20 model was released: the M20M TLS (Turbocharged Lycoming Sabre). The first year, the TLS accounted for 30 of the 143 aircraft delivered, and in 1990 this increased to 61 units. Also in 1989, Mooney released a trainer model based on the M20J. Beech, Cessna and Piper had all stopped production of trainers throughout the 1980s, and the 201AT was designed to fill this gap. From 1989 to 1992, 20 units were delivered.

=== 1990s ===
1990 saw the release of the next new model, the M20J 201, also designated the MSE. This was a 200-horsepower (150 kW) non-turbocharged model that incorporated many features from the TLS. In early 1991 Mooney decided to offer its Enhanced Flight Screener Trainer model to the general public, given that the Air Force was slow to make a decision on its trainer. It was to have a 260 horsepower (190 kW) Lycoming O-540 engine and would be rated for aerobatics. However, it generated little public interest. The TLS continued production through 1995, and the MSE continued too, until it was replaced by the M20R Ovation in 1994. Once again Mooney was offering two models: one with high speed (the TLS) and the other with high efficiency.

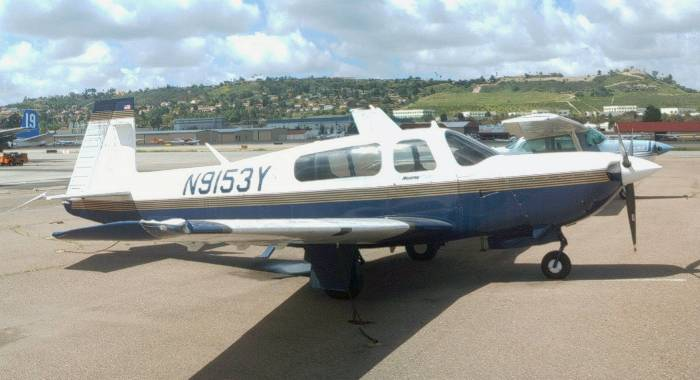
A Mooney M20M "Bravo"

The competition for the Enhanced Flight Screener program was finally held in 1992, and the Slingsby T67 Firefly was chosen instead of the Mooney EFS. Sales continued to drop, only reaching 64 units in 1993. The San Antonio location was sold and all operations returned to Kerrville. Development of the M20 continued and the M20R Ovation was released in 1994. It was designed to fill a gap between the normally-aspirated MSE and the turbocharged TLS, and it was powered by a 280-horsepower (210 kW) Continental IO-550 engine. Of the 91 Mooney aircraft manufactured in 1995, 54 were Ovations. The M20M Bravo, a TLS with more power, and the M20K Encore, an M20K with more power, appeared in 1996 and 1997, respectively.

=== 2000s ===
In July 2001, Mooney entered yet another bankruptcy and under the leadership of J. Nelson Happy as CEO, the company was acquired by Advanced Aerodynamics and Structures Inc. (AASI) in 2002. AASI resurrected Mooney under the name Mooney Aircraft Company, Inc., a division of Mooney Aerospace Group, Ltd. Two years later in 2004, MASG (AASI) sold off the Mooney assets to Allen Holding Finance in May, and filed for bankruptcy on June 10. In December, MASG restructured and reacquired Mooney Aircraft Company from Allen Holding Finance.

Gretchen L. Jahn joined Mooney in November 2004, becoming the first female CEO of a U.S. aircraft manufacturer. She oversaw the development and introduction of the M20TN Acclaim and the Garmin G1000-equipped Ovation2 GX and Bravo GX. In June 2005, Mooney added a second shift and 50 new workers to boost production.

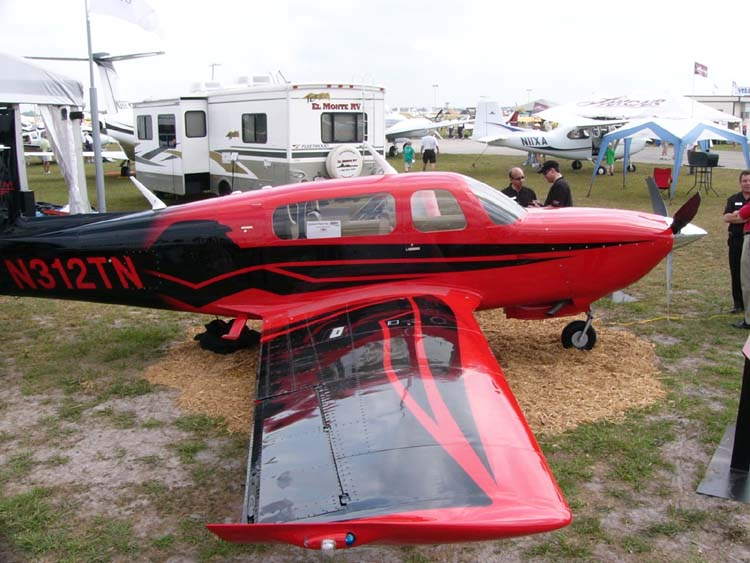
A Mooney M20T Acclaim

Mooney announced the release of the M20TN Acclaim on April 4, 2006, at the Sun 'n Fun fly-in at Lakeland, Florida. The M20TN also featured the Garmin G1000 glass cockpit, four heated, leather captain's chairs with lumbar support, a range in excess of 1,500 nautical miles (2,800 km; 1,700 mi), and a top speed of 237 knots (439 km/h). At the time of its introduction, the Acclaim was the fastest single-engine piston-powered production aircraft in the world.

Mooney was a publicly traded company after emerging from bankruptcy under the symbol MNYG (OTC BB) until October 2006, when Mooney Aerospace Group arranged financing to buy out public shareholders.

In late 2007, Mooney announced the arrival of its newest model, the M20TN Acclaim Type S. The Acclaim Type S added 5 knots (9.3 km/h) to the Acclaim's top speed to reach a speed of 242 knots (448 km/h). Mooney achieved this performance gain through aerodynamic tweaks to the Acclaim's airframe.

=== 2008 production halt ===
On 16 June 2008, Mooney announced it would lay off 60 employees and cut production from eight aircraft per month to five. Mooney CEO Dennis Ferguson said:

These decisions will not have an adverse effect on the quality or safety of our products, nor will they delay scheduled aircraft deliveries. They were made to create corporate resiliency in the present economic conditions. Our plans include positioning Mooney as a strong contender in the international market. We are strengthening our business in Europe, South America and Australia, where Mooney's high performance, efficiency and pricing are especially appealing. Our focus is to ensure the long-term viability of the company through prudent management and expansion of our market reach.

The reasons for the cutbacks and layoffs cited by the company include the weak US economy and the high price of fuel inhibiting sales. On 5 November 2008, the company announced it was halting all production and had laid off 229 of its 320 employees, due to an excess unsold inventory of aircraft as a result of the late-2000s recession. Virtually all the laid-off employees were on the production line. The company said all other operations would continue and all customer support and existing customer orders would be filled. In carrying out the layoffs, the company did not comply with the notification requirements of Texas law. In a statement Mooney said:

These unexpected and unforeseeable conditions are beyond Mooney Airplane Company's control. It was impossible for Mooney Airplane Company to predict this sudden collapse in demand at the time when notice would have been required.

In a third round of layoffs in December 2008, the company let go an additional 40 workers, leaving only about 50 employees at work. The company had 25 unsold aircraft at its factory in December 2008.

=== 2010s ===
In April 2010, after 18 months with no aircraft production, the backlog of unsold aircraft was cleared and the company announced it intended to resume aircraft production in the near future, subject to the market gaining "a little more momentum".

On 19 November 2010, Mooney started a new round of layoffs, intending to reduce company staff from 53 to less than 10 employees by 1 January 2011. The remaining staff would be employed maintaining the company's physical facilities, its type and production certificates and providing parts and technical support to aircraft owners. The company continued negotiations with potential investors to allow production to resume. Company Chief Financial Officer Barry Hodkin stated, "We are not shutting down. However, we cannot continue to subsidize the company at the level we have in the recent past. We have been in discussions with potential investors for more than 18 months and will continue to work with them. If things change, then the scope of this layoff could change".

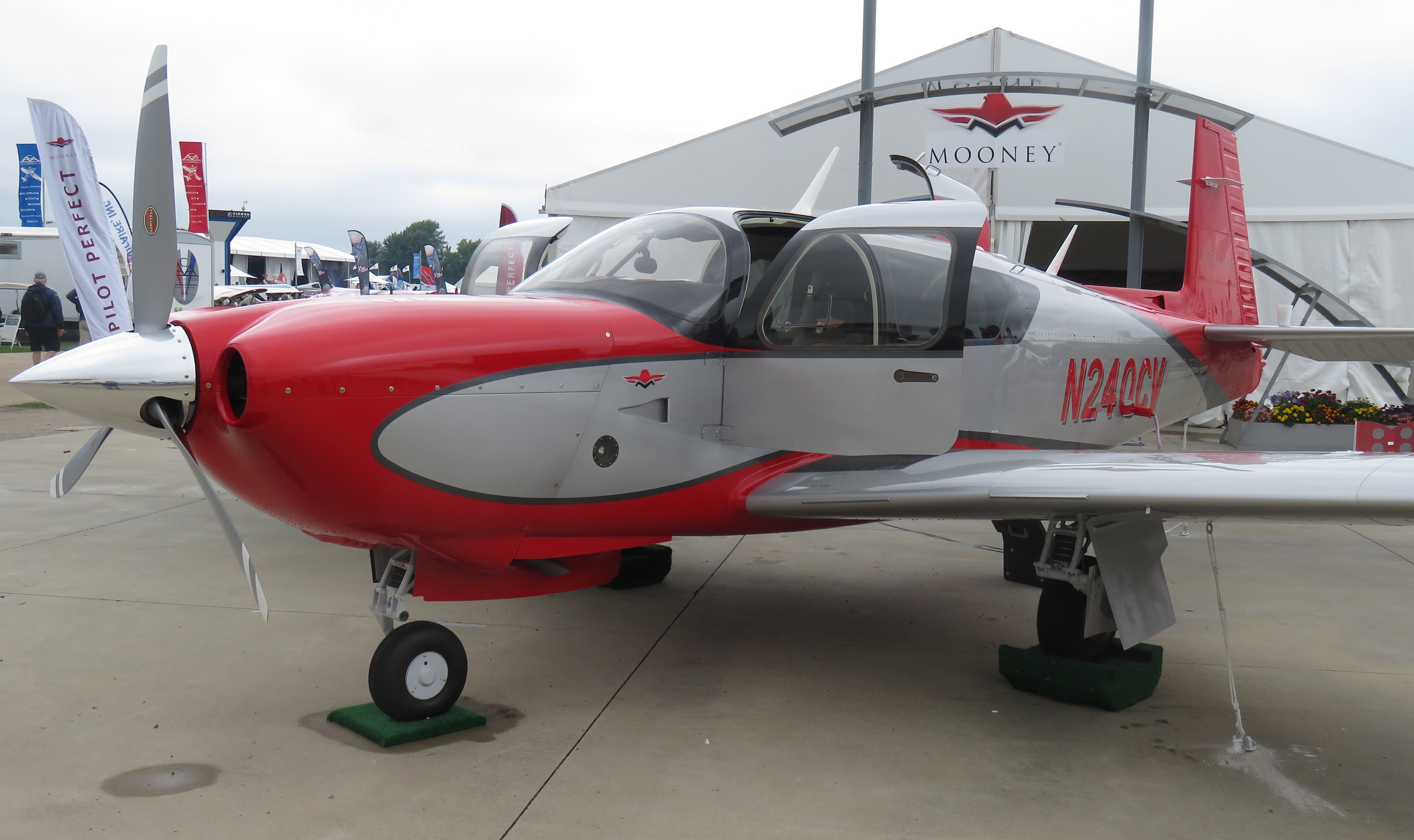
A two-door Mooney Acclaim Ultra

By August 2013, the company was still not producing new aircraft, but continued to support the existing fleet with parts. The company indicated that a return to production of complete aircraft was contemplated, depending on new investment being found.

On 8 October 2013, it was announced that the company had been purchased by Soaring America Corporation, a new California-based company headed by President Cheng Yuan (Jerry Chen) of Taiwan, for an undisclosed amount. Chen heads a group of Chinese investors that some reports indicate include the Meijing Group, a Chinese real-estate developer. Chen indicated his priorities included resuming production of the Acclaim and the Ovation, while continuing to supply parts for the existing fleet. Chen stated the company would remain in Kerrville, and concentrate on supplying new aircraft for the Chinese market. Paul Bertorelli, AVweb's Editorial Director, Aviation Publications, questioned whether the outdated and expensive-to-produce Mooney models, that use engines burning avgas, can succeed in the Chinese market.

With the injection of capital from its new Chinese owners, production resumed on 26 February 2014, beginning with the completion of five previously incomplete airframes already on the assembly line. In April 2014 at Sun 'n Fun, the company announced a US$50M investment, including the construction of a Mooney museum in Kerrville to be run by a new nonprofit organization. With production underway, 85 employees were at work, with the workforce forecast to expand to 140 by the end of 2014. Chief Executive Officer Chen stated the company would deliver 6 aircraft in 2014 and 30 in 2015. In January 2015 the first aircraft, a Mooney M20TN, was delivered to a customer in China. The aircraft was shipped disassembled and then assembled and test flown in Zhengzhou, China.

Two new Mooney models were announced on 11 November 2014. The Mooney M10T was to be a fixed-gear composite aircraft powered by Continental’s 133-horsepower (99 kW) CD-135 Diesel engine; the M10J was a variant which was to have retractable gear and the 153-horsepower (114 kW) CD-155 diesel. These were developed largely with the Chinese aviation market in mind. In China, aviation fuel is scarce and expensive, whereas Diesel fuel is less expensive and more readily available. The M10 series certification and deliveries were expected to begin in 2017, but in April 2017 the company announced that the project had been canceled, stating that the knowledge gained from this project would be applied to a future project.

In August 2016, Mooney named Vivek Saxena as its new President and CEO. Under his tenure, Mooney's newest models, the M20V Acclaim Ultra and the M20U Ovation Ultra, received full FAA certification. Mooney also secured a partnership with the rotorcraft research company Carter Aviation Technologies, LLC to work towards the Uber Elevate initiative. In April 2017 it was announced that Saxena and Mooney had "decided to part ways", with Chief Financial Officer Albert Li assuming the role of interim executive director.

It was announced in July 2017 that investors decided to shut down Mooney's research and development facilities at Chino Airport, California, and relocate to their headquarters in Kerrville.

The company sold only 14 aircraft in 2018 and only four in the first half of 2019. The company shut down and furloughed all employees on 12 November 2019. The company was reportedly seeking new American investors to reopen, but in the meantime did not respond to inquiries from the media or from existing aircraft owners seeking support or parts. The company reopened on 2 December 2019, after being closed for 20 days. It was unclear if new financing had been secured at that time or not and the company provided no additional details. It was also unclear how many workers had returned and the company continued to not return aviation media inquiries.

=== 2020s ===
On 6 January 2020 the company again laid-off all employees and did not provide them with the previously committed holiday pay owed. A company human resources employee indicated at that time that Mooney was still seeking investment, but that the company's future was unknown.

On 1 September 2020 the company was taken over by a new ownership group under US Financial, LLC. The existing company management was replaced by a new CEO, Jonny Pollack, and a team consisting of "pilots and Mooney owners". The company will prioritize providing support for the existing fleet of more than 7,000 Mooney aircraft. Future priorities are anticipated to include increasing the aircraft useful loads by providing lighter parts, such as carbon fiber reinforced polymer engine cowlings. The company will then assess future design changes, including fitting ballistic parachutes, adding auto-landing capabilities and designing larger cabins.

== Products ==
Model name	First flight	Number built	Type
Mooney M-18 Mite	1947	283	Single engine monoplane utility airplane
Mooney M-19		1	Single engine monoplane light attack airplane
Mooney M20	1953	11,000+	Single engine monoplane utility airplane
Mooney M22 Mustang	1964	36	Single engine monoplane utility airplane
Mooney A2		38	Single engine monoplane utility airplane
Mooney M10 Cadet	1968	59	Single engine monoplane utility airplane
Mooney TX-1	1982	1	Single engine monoplane trainer
Mooney 301	1983	1	Single engine monoplane utility airplane
Mooney M10T	2015	1	Single engine monoplane utility airplane
Mooney M10J	N/A	0	Single engine monoplane utility airplane
