= Mooney M-18 Mite =

General aviation aircraft first built in 1947

M-18 Mite
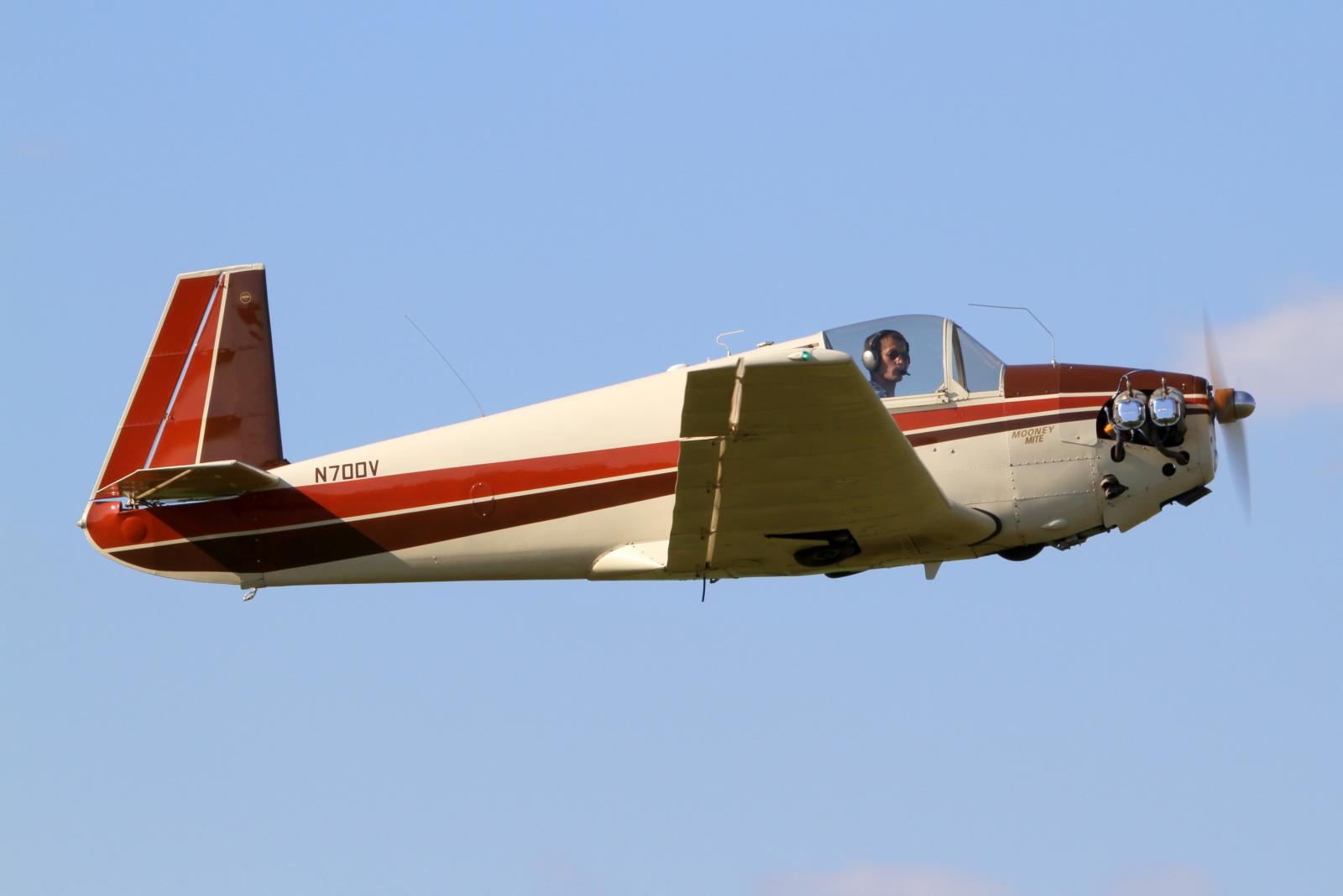
- Mooney M-18C

General information
- Type: personal use aircraft
- Manufacturer: Mooney Aircraft Company
- Designer: Al Mooney
- Number built: 283

History
- Manufactured: 1947–1954
- Introduction date: 1947
- First flight: 1947
- Variant: Mooney M20

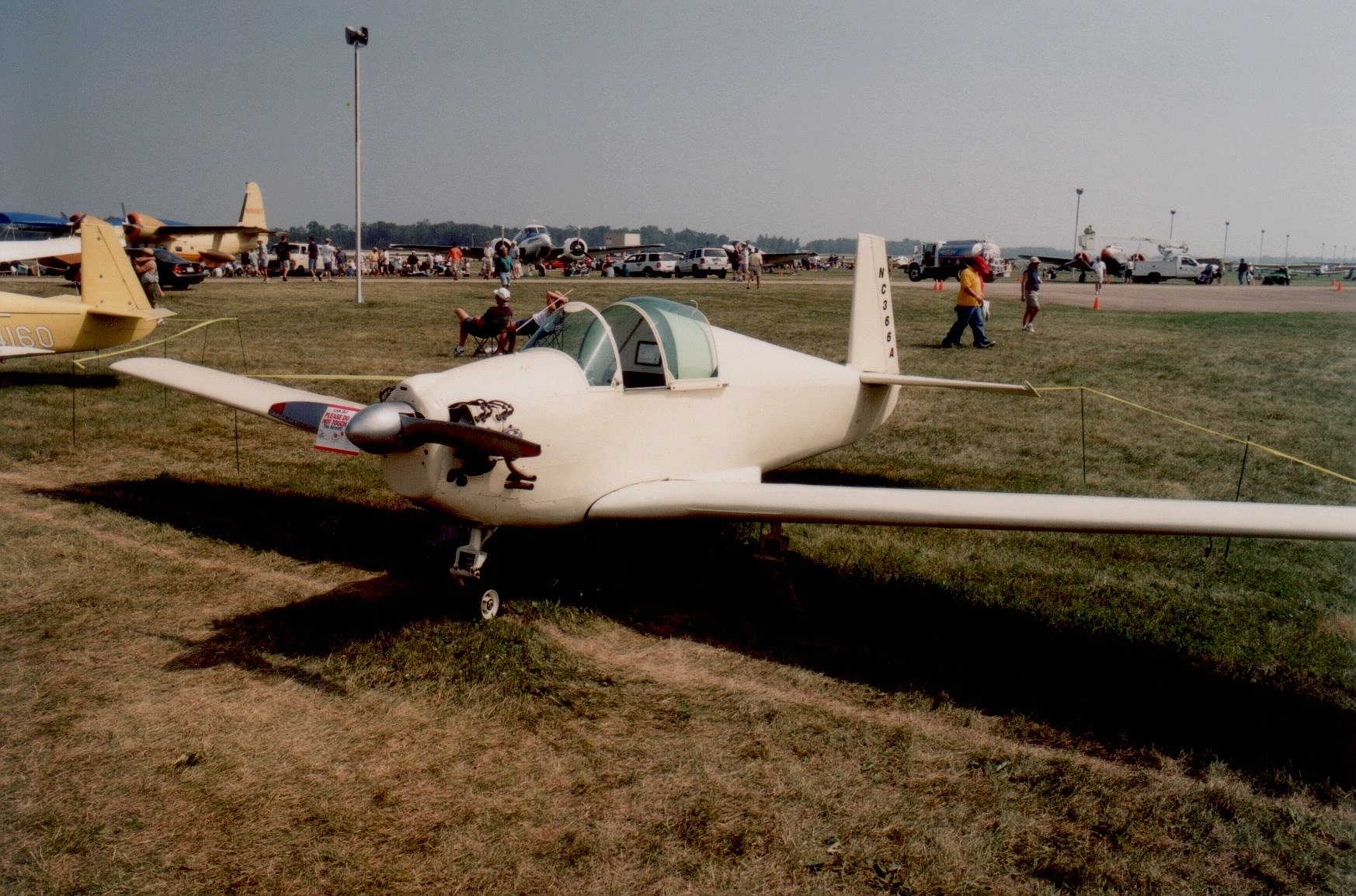
1949 model M-18L at Oshkosh 2001

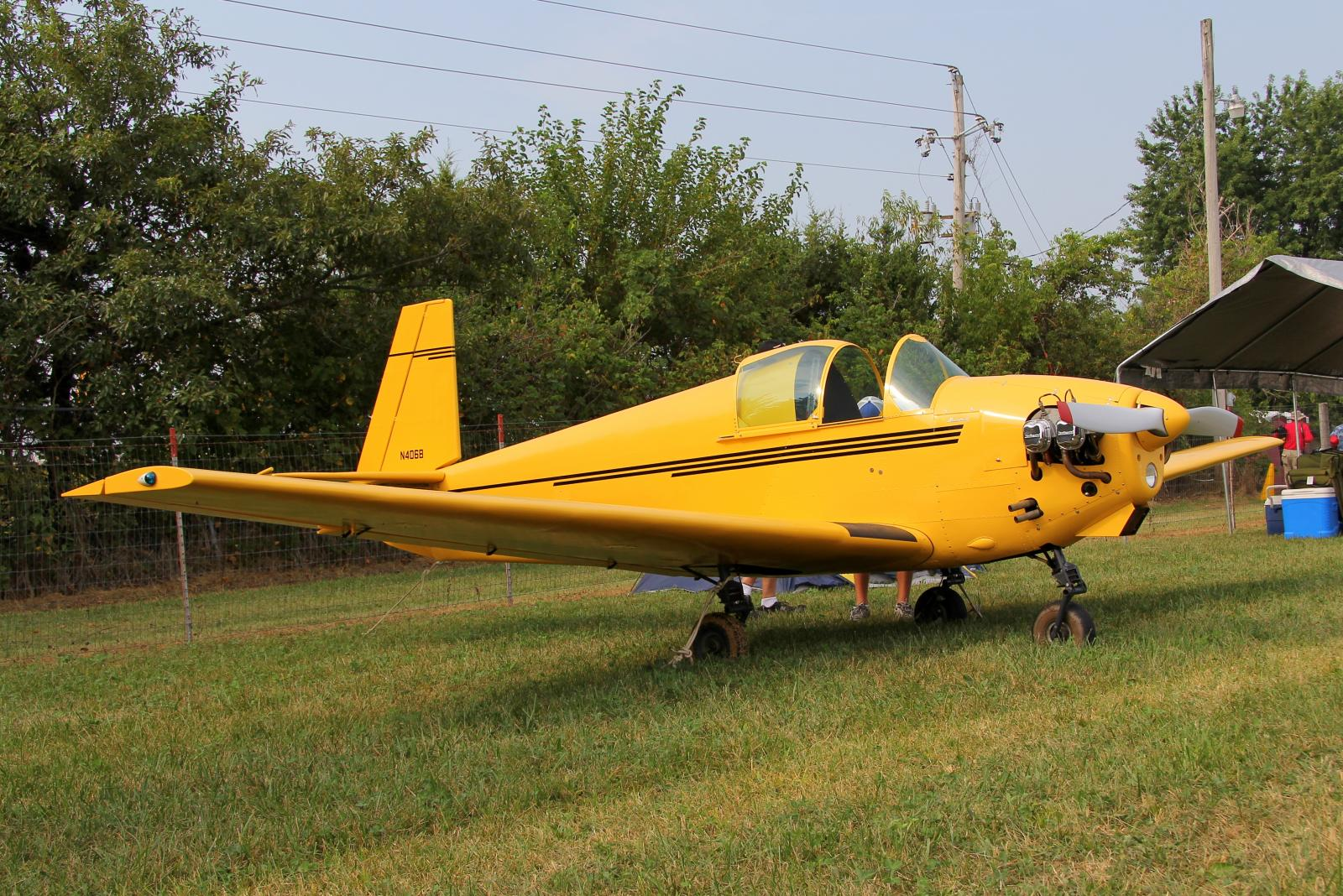
Mooney M-18C

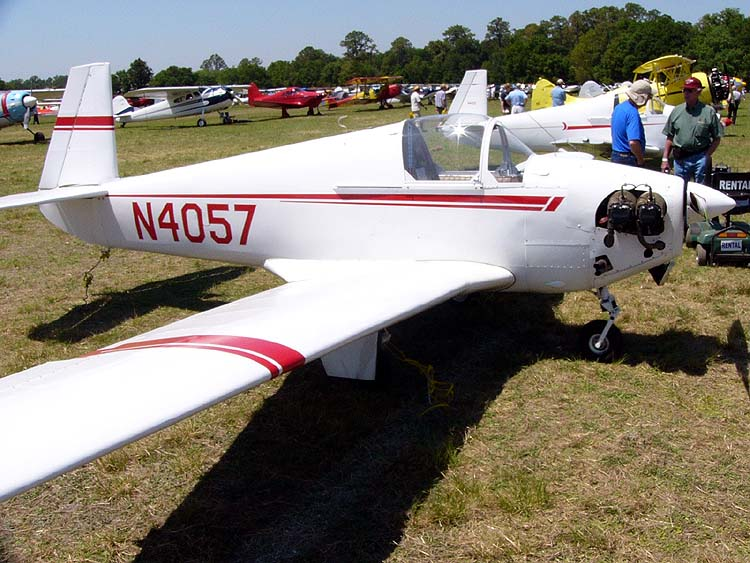
Mooney M-18C

The Mooney M-18 "Mite" is a low-wing, single-seat monoplane with retractable, tricycle landing gear.

The Mite was designed by Al Mooney and was intended as a personal airplane marketed to fighter pilots returning from World War II.

== Development ==
The M-18 design goal was extremely low operating costs. The Mite is constructed mainly of fabric-covered wood, with a single spruce and plywood "D" wing spar. The wing aft of the spar is fabric-covered.

The airfoil selected for the design was the NACA 64A215. The M-18 represented the first time a NACA 6-series airfoil had been used on a civil aircraft after World War II.

The aircraft featured a unique "safe-trim" system. This mechanical device links the wing flaps to the tail trim system and automatically adjusts the horizontal stabilizer angle when the flaps are deflected, reducing or eliminating pitch changes when the flaps are lowered.

== Production ==
The Mooney Aircraft Corporation built a total of 283 Mites in Wichita, Kansas, and Kerrville, Texas, between 1947 and 1954. The first seven were powered by belt driven, modified 25 hp (19 kW) Crosley automobile engines, but these proved to be troublesome. Production shifted to the M-18L powered by the four-cylinder, 65 hp (48 kW) Lycoming O-145 powerplant. The original Crosley-powered Mites were recalled and retrofitted with the Lycoming engines at no charge. The later M-18C used the Continental A65 65 hp (48 kW) aircraft engine.

The market for the single-seat M-18 was limited, so Mooney later developed the four-seat M-20 to appeal to aircraft owners with families. In the early 1970s, Mooney offered plans for four different home-built versions of the M-18.

Factory production of the Mite ended in 1954. Leading up to this, the company was losing $1000 on each plane, which accelerated the development of the M20. Another factor was that Continental had ceased production of the engine used in the Mite due to a lack of demand.

== Operational history ==
As of January 2016, 119 Mites were still registered in the United States and three in Canada.

== Specifications (Mooney Mite M-18C) ==
Data from A Field Guide to Airplanes - Second Edition, Plane and Pilot: 1978 Aircraft Directory & The Incomplete Guide to Airfoil Usage

General characteristics

- Crew: one pilot
- Capacity: 260 lb (118 kg)
- Length: 18 ft (5.5 m)
- Wingspan: 26 ft 9 in (8.15 m)
- Height: 6 ft 2.5 in (1.892 m)
- Wing area: 95.05 sq ft (8.830 m^{2})
- Airfoil: NACA 64A215
- Empty weight: 520 lb (236 kg)
- Gross weight: 780 lb (354 kg)
- Max takeoff weight: 780 lb (354 kg)
- Powerplant: 1 × Continental A65 wooden propeller, 65 hp (48 kW)

Performance

- Maximum speed: 138 mph (222 km/h, 120 kn)
- Cruise speed: 125 mph (201 km/h, 109 kn)
- Stall speed: 43 mph (69 km/h, 37 kn)
- Range: 440 mi (708 km, 382 nmi)
- Service ceiling: 19,400 ft (5,900 m)
- Rate of climb: 1,090 ft/min (5.5 m/s)
- Power/mass: 12 lb/hp (0.14 kW/kg)

Avionics

- None installed at the factory
