= Mooney M20 =

Family of general aviation aircraft

M20 family
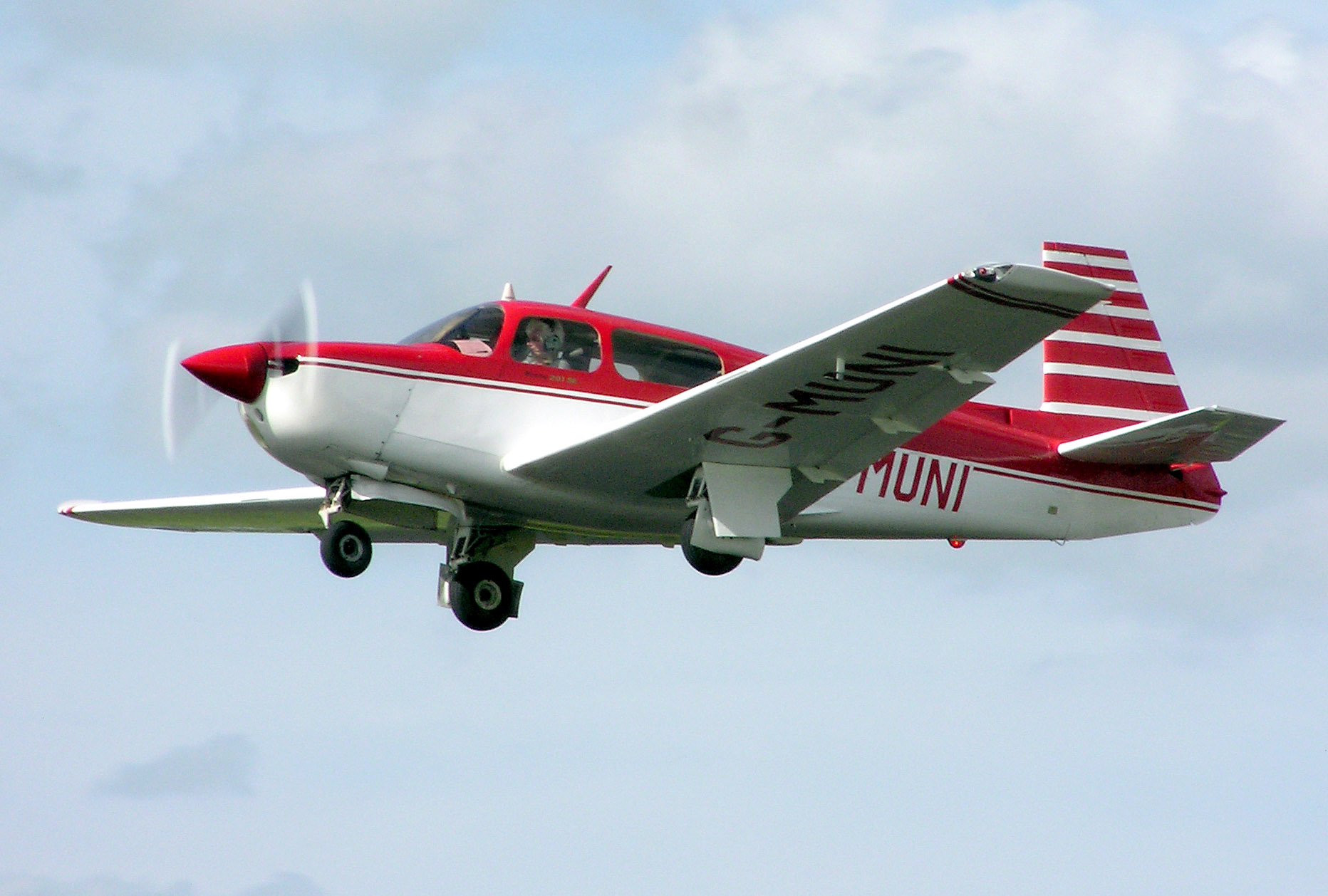
- Mooney M20J

General information
- Type: Personal use civil aircraft
- Manufacturer: Mooney International Corporation
- Designer: Al Mooney
- Status: Production completed
- Number built: >11,000

History
- Manufactured: 1955–1971, 1974–2008, 2014–2019
- Introduction date: 1955
- First flight: September 3, 1953
- Developed from: Mooney M-18 Mite
- Variant: Mooney TX-1

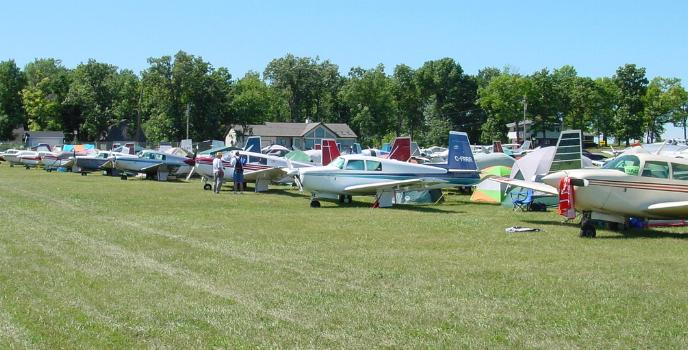
Mooney M20s gathered at the 2002 Mooney Caravan to AirVenture, Oshkosh, Wisconsin

The Mooney M20 is a family of piston-powered, four-seat, propeller-driven, general aviation aircraft, all featuring low wings and tricycle gear, manufactured by the Mooney International Corporation.

The M20 was the 20th design from Al Mooney, and his most successful. The series has been produced in many variations over the last 60 years, from the wooden-wing M20 and M20A models of 1955, to the M20V Acclaim Ultra that debuted in 2016. More than 11,000 aircraft in total have been produced across three production runs, the most recent concluding in 2019.

In November 2008, Mooney International announced that it was halting all production as a result of the late-2000s recession, but would still provide parts and support for the existing fleet. With the injection of new capital from the company's purchase by a Chinese private equity firm, production of the M20 resumed in February 2014. Since then, the company has released two more M20 models.

== Development ==
Al Mooney had been developing preliminary designs for the four-seater M20 for some time, while the single-seat M-18 Mite was in production in the late 1940s and early 1950s. When in early 1953 the company moved from Wichita, Kansas, to Kerrville, Texas, and when it became clear that the Mite was nearing the end of its production, development of the M20 accelerated. The first M20 flight took place on September 3, 1953, and it was certified on August 24, 1955.

During 1955, the company sold 10 of the M20 airplanes. Due to start-up costs, they lost about $3000 on each airplane. In 1956, they delivered 51 airplanes, and in 1957 the total was 105. The airplane gained attention because it was able to achieve speeds up to 170 miles per hour (270 km/h) with a 150 hp (110 kW) Lycoming O-320 engine. The combination of speed and efficiency was noteworthy. In 1958 the M20A joined the lineup with a larger 180 hp (130 kW) Lycoming O-360-A1A engine, and by 1959, this was the only model offered, 231 units were sold that year. 1959 was also the first year that the company made a profit. The M20A continued production into 1960, when 166 were delivered. These were the last of the Mooneys to have wooden structures in the wings and tail. Early in the model's history, several incidents of wooden tails breaking up in flight occurred due to water damage and the resulting rot. Consequently, most tails have now been replaced with all-metal copies, as required by Mooney Service Bulletin M20-170A and the FAA Airworthiness Directive 86-19-10. Without the possibility of metal fatigue, the wooden wing has an indefinite life expectancy and is considered by some pilots to provide a smoother ride in turbulence.

=== 1960s ===
In January 1960, the Mooney company convinced Ralph Harmon to leave McDonnell Aircraft in St. Louis, Missouri, and take over management of the engineering efforts. He insisted on replacing the wood in the M20 with aluminum, and the all-metal M20B was completed by the end of 1960, less than a year after his arrival. In 1961, the company sold 222 M20B airplanes. The following year, the M20C was introduced and 336 were sold that year. Also known as the Mark 21 and later the Ranger, the M20C had several improvements over the M20B, including greater deflection on control surfaces, reduced cowl flap openings for better engine cooling, improved exhaust scavenging with a Hanlon and Wilson exhaust system, new battery access door, more powerful landing light, lightweight floor, an increased gross weight of 2,575 pounds (1,168 kg), lighter empty weight, new instrument panel layout, and a higher maximum flap angle of 33 degrees.

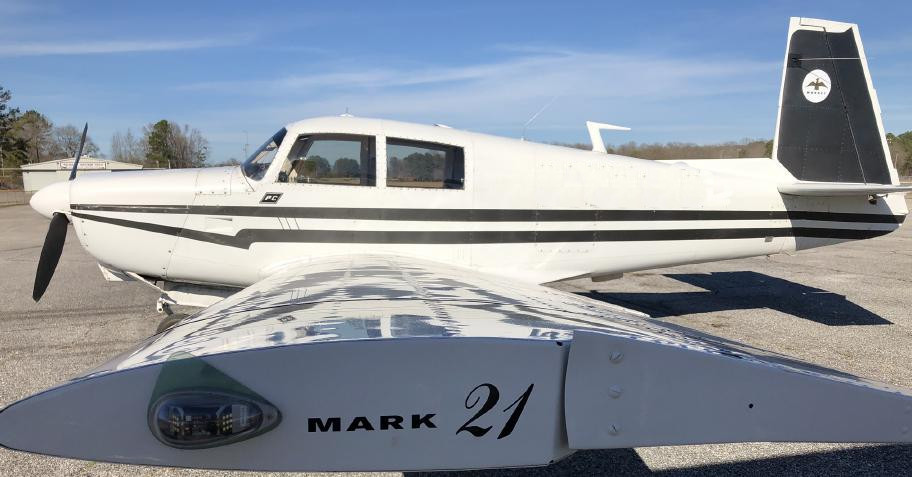
1967 Mooney M20C

In 1963, the M20D was introduced, essentially an M20C with fixed landing gear and a fixed-pitch propeller. This had a slightly lower price than the M20C and was intended as a basic or trainer model which would have lower insurance costs and which would compete with the Piper Cherokee 180. It could be upgraded with retractable landing gear, and in fact, most of them were upgraded over the years. The M20D was produced from 1963 to 1966 with a total production of 161 units. In 1964 the M20E Super 21 was introduced. It was also based on the M20C but with a more powerful 200 hp (150 kW) Lycoming fuel-injected engine. The company sold 366 M20E units that year.

In 1965, a new feature was introduced to the M20. It was called "positive control" and was a single-axis autopilot produced by Brittain Industries. It maintained the wings of the airplane in a level position unless a button on the control wheel was depressed for turns and banks. It was a controversial feature, liked by some pilots and disliked by others. Production and sales of the M20 continued to increase. In 1966, a total of 760 units were delivered, including 280 of the M20C Mark 21 planes and 473 of the M20E Super 21s. A new model, the M20F Executive 21, offered more legroom due to a 10-inch (25 cm) increase in cabin length which also allowed for a third fuselage side window. It had 64 US gallons (240 L) of fuel capacity compared to 52 US gallons (200 L) in earlier models, and grossed an additional 165 pounds (75 kg). This year, the company exceeded $1,000,000 in profits.

The M20G Statesman, a version of the M20F with less-powerful 180 horsepower (130 kW) engine, was released in 1968. It had a larger airframe than the M20C, but the same engine, and as a result was slower. It was not as successful as the M20F and was produced for only three years, from 1968 to 1970, with a total production run of 189 units.

Despite strong sales, Mooney was short of cash. The company went into chapter 7 bankruptcy in early 1969, and was acquired by American Electronics Laboratories and then Butler Aviation International. Sales that year were less than half of the previous year's figures, although a new version of the M20E Chaparral was released with electrically operated flaps and landing gear. Butler Aviation also acquired the troubled Aerostar company and combined it with Mooney in an attempt to save both. The Mooney name was dropped in 1970, as was the M20 designation; the planes were called Aerostars.

=== 1970s ===
Butler Aviation closed the Mooney plant in early 1971, and it remained closed for more than two years. In October 1973, Mooney was purchased by Republic Steel. Robert Cumming, a general manager at Republic Steel, had owned a Mooney M20F Executive for years and flew it frequently, and wished to put the Mooney M20 back into production. This began in January 1974 with the reintroduction of the M20F Executive. Roy LoPresti, formerly of Grumman American, had been hired as the vice president of engineering. Through the efforts of his engineering group, various improvements were made to the M20 with the goal of increasing its speed, and the M20J was introduced in July 1976. It was also known as the Mooney 201 because it was capable of 201 miles per hour (323 km/h) with its 200 horsepower (150 kW) engine. The 201 was a big seller, and a turbocharged version was developed later that year. The next year, 1977, three models were offered: the M20C Ranger, the M20F Executive, and the M20J 201. By 1979, the M20C had been dropped, ending production of the short-body M20.

The same year, 1979, the company's first turbocharged M20 was released: the M20K 231, so designated because its top speed was 231 miles per hour (372 km/h). It was based on the earlier 201 with further improvements. It had a wider wingspan and a six-cylinder Continental engine, and the fuel capacity was increased to 80 US gallons (300 L; 67 imp gal). This year, a total of 439 airplanes were delivered—fewer than the top years of the 1960s, but these deliveries resulted in healthy profits. From this point through 1986, the M20J and the turbocharged M20K were the only two models offered.

=== 1980s ===
General aviation manufacturing experienced a significant downturn starting in 1982. Mooney was affected along with other manufacturers and was forced to downsize through temporary layoffs. Despite the recession, development work continued. The 201 and 231 received more improvements, including significant reductions in cabin noise levels. In 1982, deliveries fell to 218 units, and in 1983 only 154 aircraft were produced. The United States Air Force announced a competition to develop a replacement for the Cessna T-41 trainer, and Mooney immediately began to develop a military trainer based on the 231.

While the company was dealing with the recession, Republic Steel was acquired by the Ling-Temco-Vought corporation and dropped Mooney. The company ended up in the hands of Armand Rivard of Lake Aircraft and Alexandre Couvelair, a Mooney dealer from Paris. Sales continued to fall, totaling 143 in 1984 and 99 in 1985.

The next new model, the M20K 252, appeared in early 1986 with a top speed of 252 miles per hour (406 km/h). It replaced the 231 and achieved its higher speed with the same 210 horsepower (160 kW) engine. It featured a new 28-volt electrical system to power additional equipment and to improve cold-weather starting. The Continental TSIO-360-GB engine in the 231 had required specific pilot training and modified takeoff and climb procedures to operate at acceptable engine temperatures in hot weather. Because of this, the 252 received an intercooled TSIO-360-MB engine. The various improvements were copied to the 201 airframe, and the new 205 model was released in 1987.

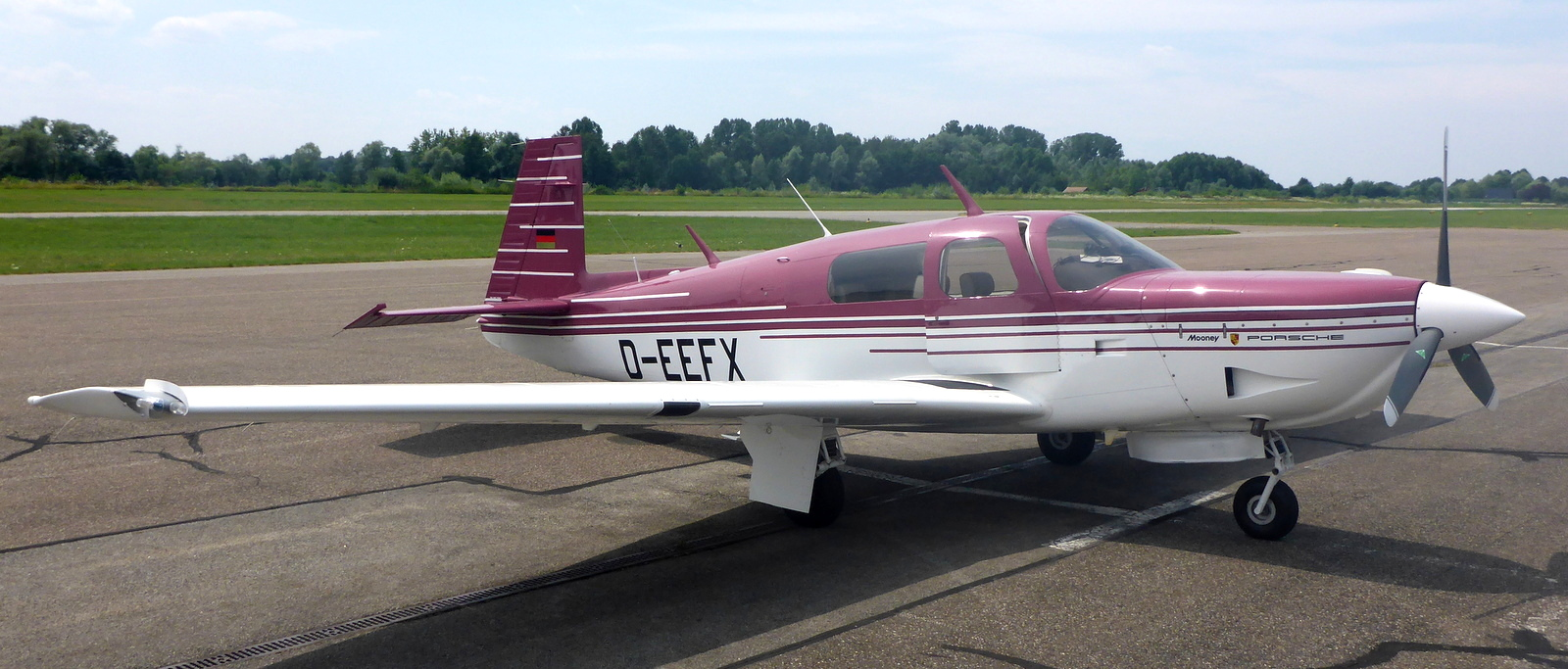
Mooney M20L with the Porsche PFM 3200 N03 engine derived from an automotive engine design

This was followed in 1988 by the M20L PFM, powered by a Porsche PFM 3200 engine which had been developed from the 911 Carrera engine. The maximum speed with this configuration was 161 kn (298 km/h). The fuselage was stretched to form the first long-body M20. One new feature on this airplane was the replacement of the throttle, mixture and propeller controls with a single power control; mixture and propeller rotation speed were automatically adjusted based on the setting of this single control. The Mooney PFM did not last, a total of 41 units having been manufactured in 1988 and 1989. Most M20Ls no longer use this unique engine, as factory support ceased in 2005.

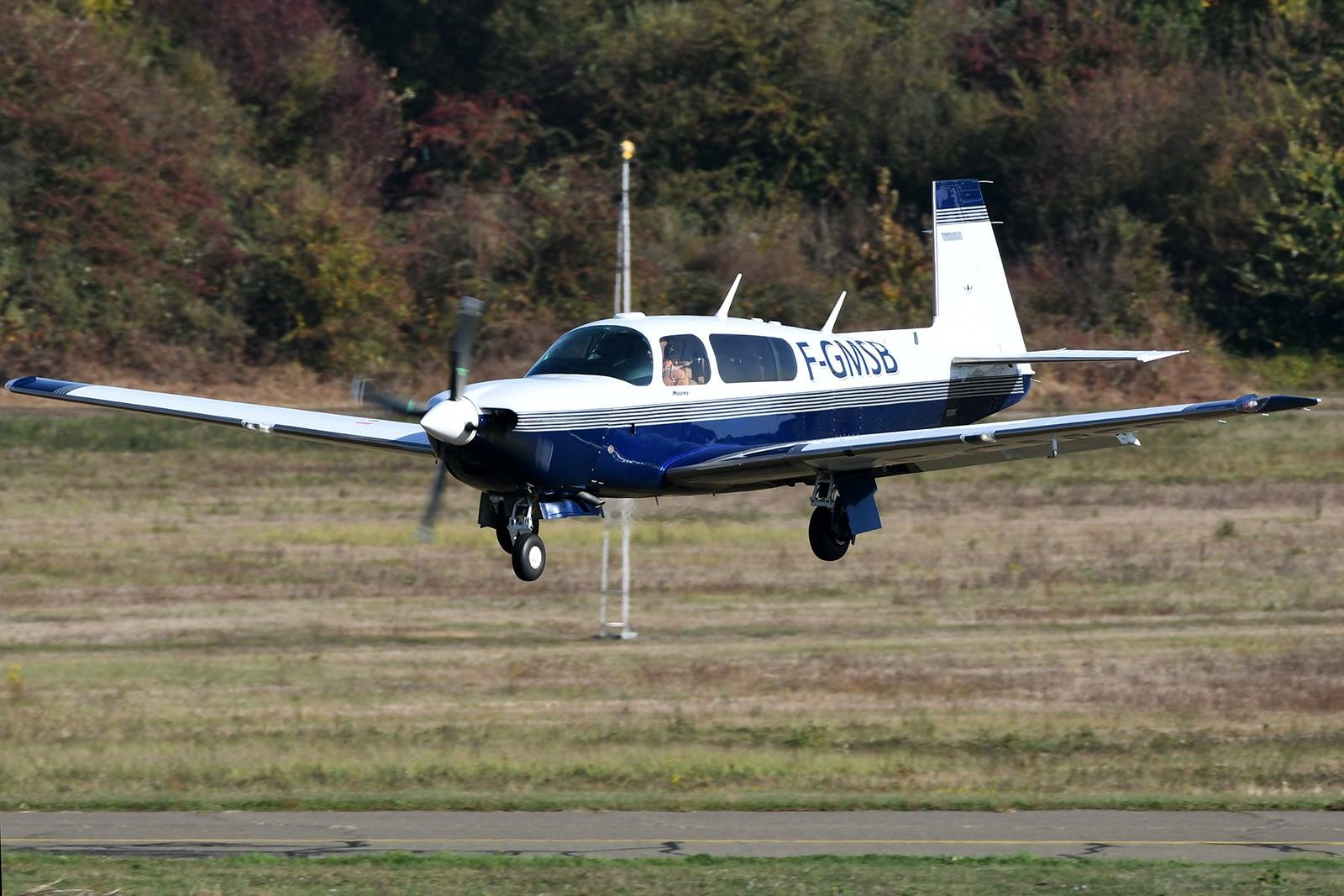
Mooney M20M with the Lycoming turbocharged engine

In February 1989, the next M20 model was released: the M20M TLS (Turbocharged Lycoming Sabre). It was powered, as the name hinted, by a turbocharged Lycoming six-cylinder engine that produced 270 horsepower (200 kW) at 2,575 rpm, and it had a three-bladed propeller. It was capable of cruising at 230 miles per hour (370 km/h) and had a range of 1,060 miles (1,710 km) and a maximum climb rate of 2,380 feet (730 m) per minute. The first year, the TLS accounted for 30 of the 143 aircraft delivered, and in 1990, this increased to 61 units. Also in 1989, Mooney released a trainer model based on the M20J. Beech, Cessna, and Piper had all stopped production of trainers throughout the 1980s, and the 201AT was designed to fill this gap. From 1989 to 1992, 20 units were delivered.

=== 1990s ===
The next Mooney M20 model was the M20J 201, also designated the MSE, released in 1990 (although few were actually delivered prior to 1991). This was a 200 horsepower (150 kW) non-turbocharged model that incorporated many features from the TLS. In early 1991, Mooney decided to offer its Enhanced Flight Screener Trainer model to the general public, given that the Air Force was slow to make a decision on its trainer. It was to have a 260 horsepower (190 kW) Lycoming O-540 engine and would be rated for aerobatics. However, it generated little public interest. The TLS continued production through 1995, and the MSE continued, too, until it was replaced by the M20R Ovation in 1994. Once again, Mooney was offering two models: one offering high speed (the TLS) and the other offering high efficiency.

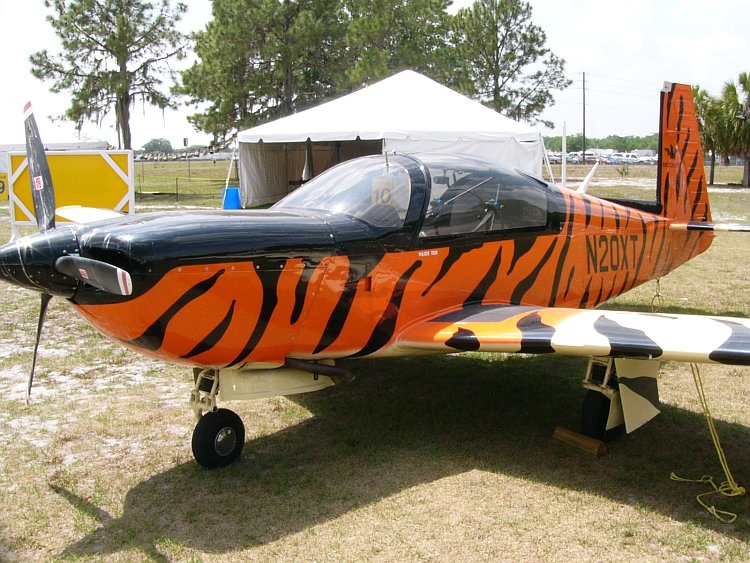
Mooney M20T Predator prototype, N20XT, on display at Sun 'n Fun 2006

The M20T Predator, a canopy-equipped version of the basic M20 design powered by a Lycoming AEIO-540 engine, was Mooney's entrant in the USAF Enhanced Flight Screener competition. The prototype, built in 1991, displayed in a tiger-stripe paint scheme. The sole prototype, registered N20XT, was flown in the Experimental – Market Survey category and was still owned by Mooney Aircraft in 2013, although its registration had expired November 30, 2013. The competition for the Enhanced Flight Screener program was finally held in 1992, and the Slingsby T67 Firefly was chosen instead of the Mooney EFS. Sales continued to drop, only reaching 64 units in 1993. The San Antonio location was sold and all operations returned to Kerrville. Development of the M20 continued, however, and the M20R Ovation was released in 1994. It was designed to fill a gap between the normally aspirated MSE and the turbocharged TLS, and it was powered by a 280 horsepower (210 kW) Continental IO-550 engine. Of the 91 Mooney aircraft manufactured in 1995, 54 were Ovations. This model was named Flying's single-engine plane of the year in 1994.

The following year, an upgraded model of the TLS with a more powerful Lycoming TIO-540-AF1B engine, was designated the M20M, but also was referred to as the "Bravo" due to the new B engine. This upgrade was offered to owners of earlier TLS models that had the TIO-540-AF1A engine. Soon after the release of the Bravo, the TKS ice protection system was offered for the Bravo and Ovation models. The M20K Encore was released in 1997, an M20K with more horsepower and a higher gross weight, giving it performance similar to the original M20K. It also had an improved interior and reduced cabin noise levels.

The M20S Eagle, released in 1999, was powered by a 244 hp (182 kW) Continental IO-550-G. It was followed in 2001 by the Eagle 2. This model included refinements such as a standard leather interior. The Eagle 2 also used the same 3 blade propeller as the original versions of the M20R and was produced from 1994 to 1999.

=== 2000s ===
The M20TN Acclaim was released in 2006, powered by a turbonormalized Continental TSIO-550-G powerplant with twin turbochargers and dual intercoolers. The Acclaim replaced the Mooney M20M Bravo in the company product line.

Mooney laid off 60 employees in June 2008 and cut production, citing a weak economy and sales inhibited by high fuel prices. Later that year, in November, all production was halted.

In July 2008, Mooney signed a memorandum of understanding with Rolls-Royce to develop a version of the M20 that was to have been powered by the Rolls-Royce RR500 TP turboprop powerplant. The project was announced as being a joint "marketing investigation" and "exploration project", but does not appear to have come to fruition.

=== 2010s ===
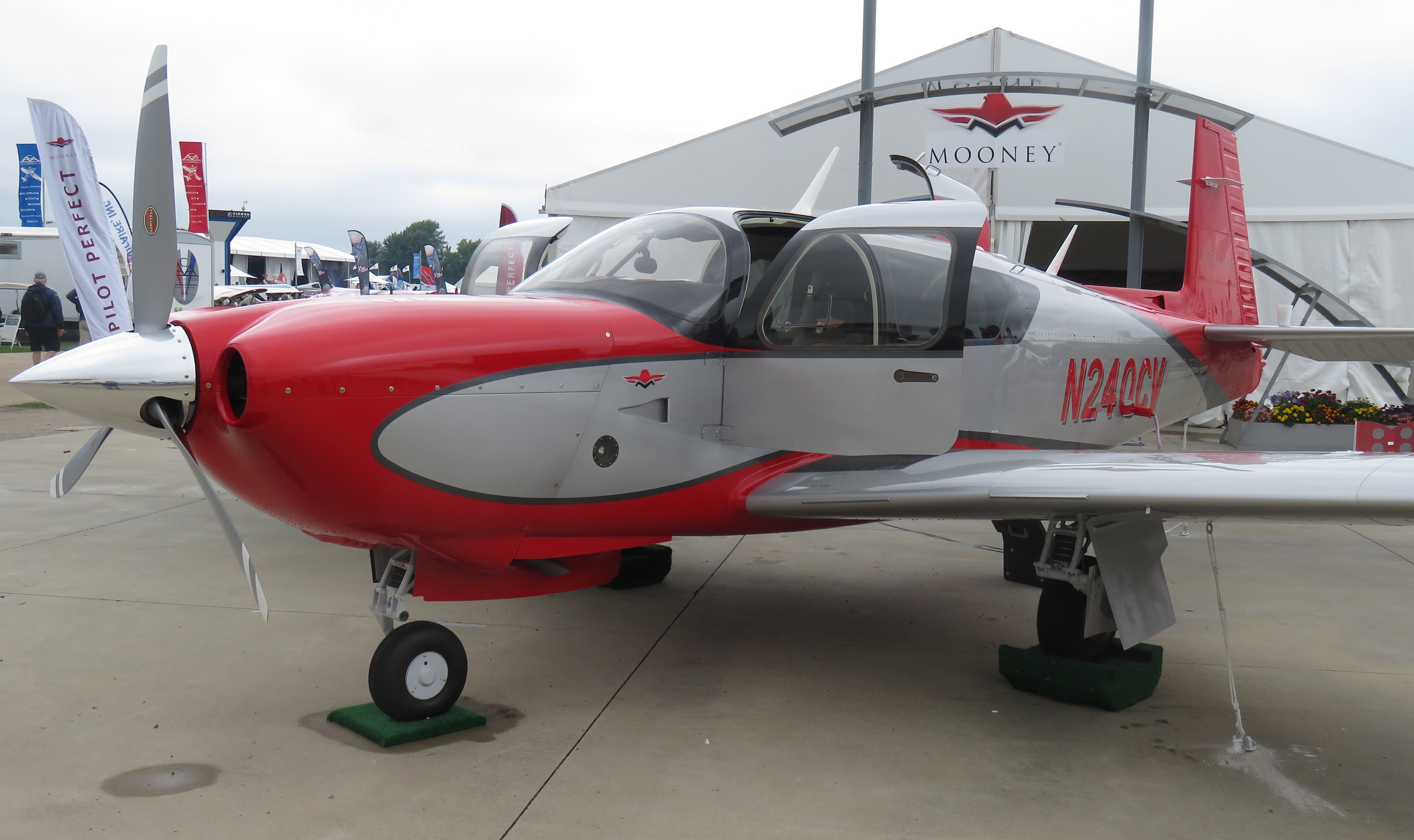
Mooney Acclaim Ultra

More employees were laid off in late 2010. The stated goal was to have fewer than 10 employees at the start of 2011, who were to provide parts and support to existing aircraft owners while the company searched for new investment. This search ended in late 2013; investment from the Meijing Group, a Chinese private equity and real estate development company, enabled Mooney to resume production in early 2014. Later that year, the M10T and the M10J were announced, both to be powered by Continental diesel engines.

Two new models were released in 2016: the M20U Ovation Ultra and the M20V Acclaim Ultra. The M20U was based on the M20R, and its first flight was on June 4, 2016. It was the first M20 to have a pilot-side door. It also featured a composite shell forward fuselage which replaced the traditional aluminum skin. The M20V, which was developed from the M20TN Acclaim, had those features, as well.

The company closed its doors and laid off all staff on November 12, 2019. The company reopened and staff returned to work on December 2, 2019.

== Design ==
With the exception of the earliest models which had wings and tails with wooden frames, M20s are constructed entirely of metal. All are low-wing aircraft, and the wing skin is aluminum. Slotted flaps cover 70% of the trailing edge. Earlier models use a hydraulic hand pump to extend the flaps, while later models have electrically operated flaps. The forward fuselage has a steel-tube cabin structure covered in aluminum skin; the aft portion of the fuselage is of semi-monocoque design. In many places on the skin of the airplane, flush-mounted rivets are used to reduce drag.

The landing gear on the Mooney M20 are made of heat-treated chrome-molybdenum steel. The main landing gear is attached to the main wing spar, while the nose gear is mounted to the tubular steel frame. Stacks of rubber shock discs act as shock absorbers. All models, with the exception of the M20D Master, came with retractable landing gear; on these models, the nose wheel retracts rearwards and the main wheels retract inwards. Early models use a hand-operated lever system to raise and lower the gear. The manually actuated landing gear are raised by unlocking the lever, which is called a "Johnson Bar" (named after the Johnson Bar (locomotive)), from just below the throttle, rotating it to the floor, and locking it into a fixture on the floor. Lowering the landing gear require the same operations in opposite order. Al Mooney got his start working as young man for the railroad industry, hence the borrowing of a steam locomotive term for use in describing part of an aircraft. Starting in 1969, electrically operated landing gear became standard.

The Mooney M20 has medium aspect-ratio tapered wings with 1.5 degrees of washout and 5.5 degrees of dihedral. Later models were equipped with stall strips to improve the stall characteristics.

The empennage of the Mooney M20 is easily recognizable by its unique tail fin with a vertical leading edge. (The tail fin looks as though it is "leaning forward", but it is approximately vertical in level flight, depending on trim setting.) The horizontal tailplane, which consists of fixed stabilizers and trailing elevators, has no trim tabs. The entire tail assembly pivots at the rear of the fuselage to provide pitch trim.

All M20s store fuel in two separate "wet wing" tanks, which are located in the inboard sections of each wing. Fuel is driven from the tank to the injectors or carburetor by an engine-driven pump, backed up with an electric boost pump.

For increased power, many M20s also have a ram-air induction system, called the Mooney "Power Boost". For normal operations, the intake air is filtered before it enters the induction system. When ram air is selected, partially unfiltered air enters the induction system with a higher pressure and consequently the manifold pressure increases about a full inch of mercury flying at 7500 feet above mean sea level, giving a greater power output. The turbocharged variants omit this feature, as the turbocharger provides a far greater increase in manifold pressure.

The Mooney M20 series has been produced in three fuselage lengths: the "short-body" (M20 through M20E), "medium-body" (M20F through M20K), and "long-body" (M20L through M20V). Although all M20s have four seats, the fuselage length increase provided more rear passenger legroom, but with a slight performance decrease: for a similar engine and vintage, a long-body plane is 4 to 6 knots slower than the short-body plane.

== Operational history ==
In August 2017, 6,748 Mooney M20 aircraft were registered with US Federal Aviation Administration, 342 with Transport Canada, and 33 in the United Kingdom with the Civil Aviation Authority. As of July 2018, 154 M20 aircraft were registered with Australia's CASA.

In June and July, 2017, pilot Brian Lloyd flew his Mooney M20K 231 around the world, commemorating Amelia Earhart's attempted circumnavigation which took place 80 years earlier in 1937. Lloyd followed a route similar to the one taken by Earhart.

== Variants ==
M20 Mark 20
Initial variant with mostly wooden construction and manually retracting landing gear. The 1953 prototype, registered N4199, was originally powered by a 145 hp (108 kW) Continental C-145-2H engine. The prototype was later re-engined with a 150 hp (110 kW) Lycoming O-320 engine driving a two-bladed Hartzell constant-speed propeller, which became standard on production aircraft. Despite the engine change, the cowling was not redesigned, leading to sub-optimal intake air pressure; a problem that would not be fixed for many years. The gross weight was also increased from 2,200 lb (1,000 kg) for the prototype to 2,450 lb (1,110 kg) for production aircraft. During its four-year production run, the M20 received numerous improvements. Although all M20s were built with wooden tails, the FAA issued Airworthiness Directive 68-25-6 in 1968 requiring all aircraft be fitted with a metal tail. Certified August 24, 1955. 200 total built; 10 (1955, including 1953 prototype), 51 (1956), 105 (1957), and 34 (1958).

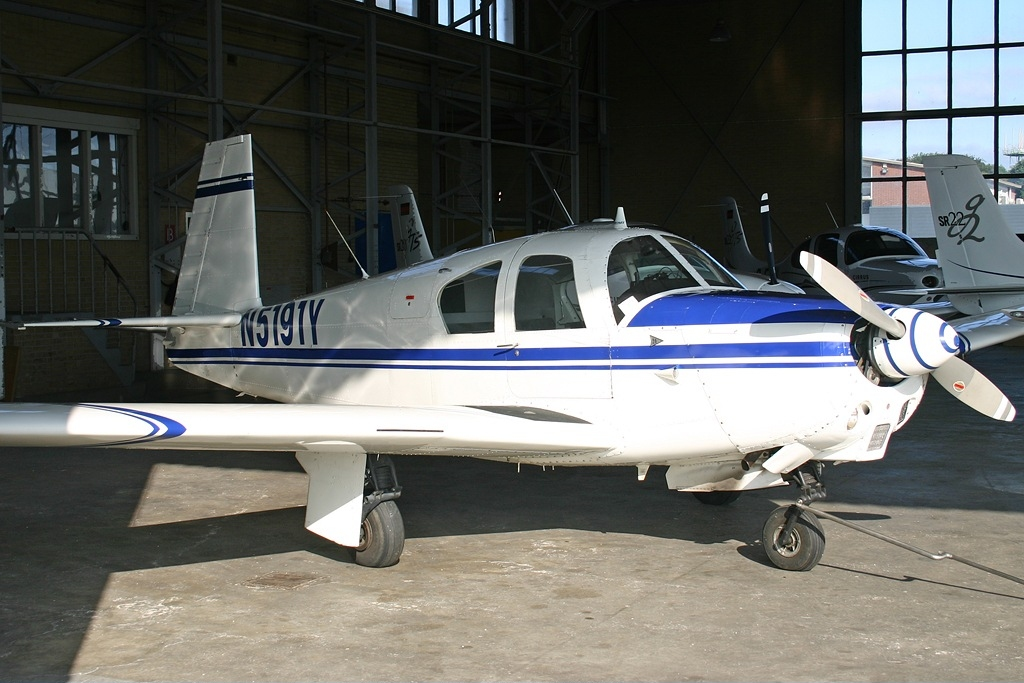
M20A Mark 20A

M20A Mark 20A
Introduced in 1958 with a 180 hp (130 kW) Lycoming O-360-A1A engine, though also certified for the O-360-A1D. As with the M20, Airworthiness Directive 68-25-6 required that all M20As be fitted with a metal tail. Certified February 13, 1958. 500 total built; 103 (1958), 231 (1959), and 166 (1960).
M20B Mark 21
Introduced in 1961 as the first M20 with all-metal construction. The M20B's empty weight was increased by 110 lb (50 kg) over that of the M20A, though the gross weight remained at 2,450 lb (1,110 kg). Certified December 14, 1960. 222 built, all in 1961.
M20C
- M20C Mark 21, introduced in 1962 with a 180 hp (130 kW) Lycoming O-360-A1D engine and gross weight increased to 2,575 lb (1,168 kg). Electrically retracting landing gear was introduced as an option in 1965, while a single-axis Brittian Industries autopilot marketed as "positive control" or "PC" was added as standard equipment. At some point during production, the rounded windows of the Mark 21 were redesigned to a more rectangular shape. Certified October 20, 1961. 1,653 total built; 336 (1962), 328 (1963), 183 (1964), 379 (1965), 280 (1966), and 147 (1967).
- M20C Ranger, replaced the Mark 21 in 1968 with a one-piece windshield, fixed cowl flaps and entrance step, and the dorsal fin removed. In 1969, a new power quadrant was added, and the formerly optional electrical flaps and landing gear were made standard. Mooney branding was dropped in 1971, and no Rangers were produced in 1972 and 1973. When Ranger production restarted in 1974, it reverted to the Mooney branding. 530 total built; 196 (1968), 97 (1969), 88 (1970), 37 (1974), 39 (1975), 33 (1976), 25 (1977), and 15 (1978).
- Aerostar 200 Ranger, rebranding of the M20C with an ornamental appendage on the tip of the vertical tail, a streamlined stinger tail cone, and an improved air distribution system. 9 built, all in 1971.

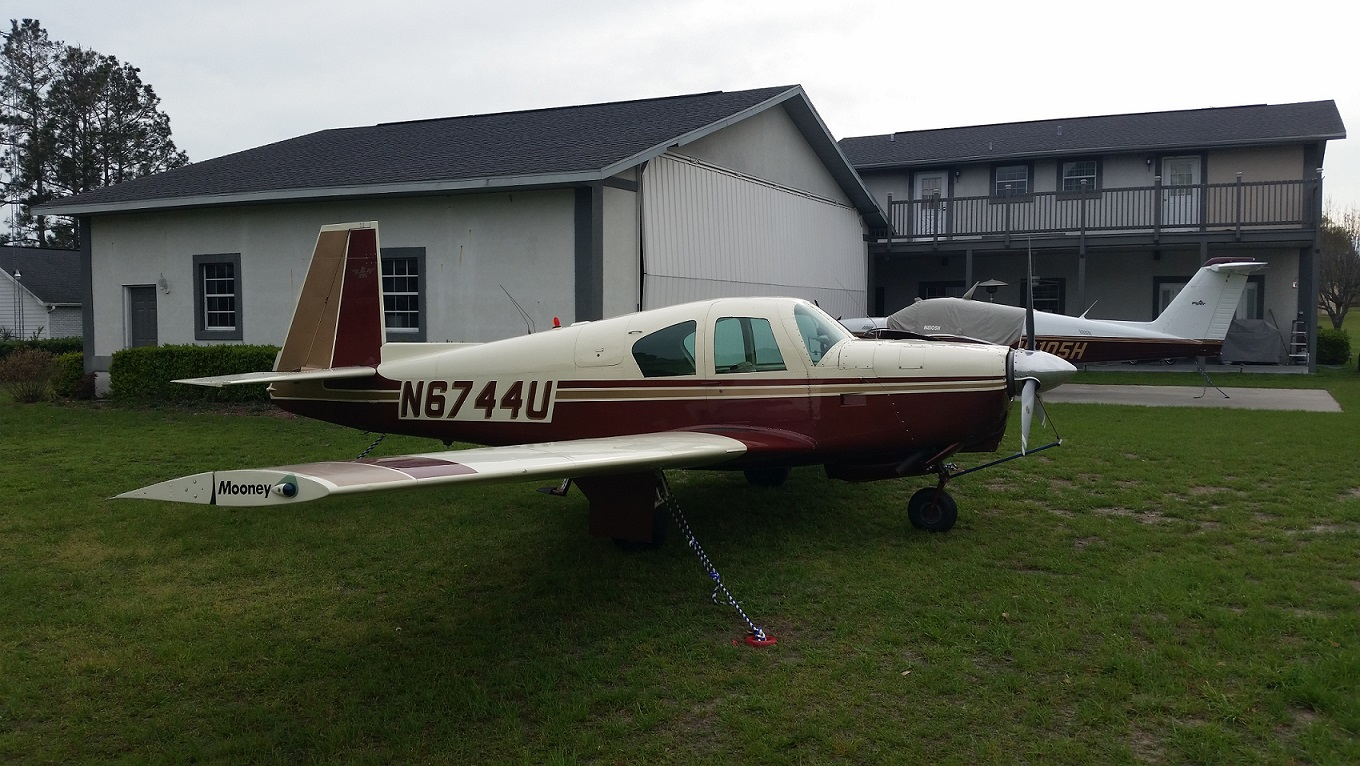
M20D Master. Although originally built with fixed landing gear, this aircraft was retrofitted with retractable gear similar to that found on other variants.

M20D Master
Simplified trainer variant introduced in 1963. The Master is powered by a 180 hp (130 kW) Lycoming O-360-A1D engine driving a fixed-pitch Hartzell or McCauley propeller, though a constant-speed unit was offered as an option. Unlike other M20 variants, the M20D was sold with fixed landing gear. Mooney offered a factory conversion to replace the fixed gear with retractable units, which a majority of M20Ds underwent. Unlike the M20C and M20E, the 1965 and 1966 M20D did not receive the "positive control" autopilot. Gross weight was reduced to 2,500 lb (1,100 kg). Certified October 15, 1962. 161 total built; 100 (1963), 51 (1964), 9 (1965), and 1 (1966).
M20E
- M20E Super 21, introduced in 1964 as a higher-powered version of the Mark 21. Powered by a fuel injected 200 hp (150 kW) Lycoming IO-360-A1A engine, the M20E is otherwise largely identical to the M20C. Like the M20C, the M20E received the "positive control" autopilot system in 1965. Other changes introduced in 1965 include a retractable entrance step, improved nose gear door closures, new bucket seats with recessed arm rests, improved cabin ventilation, a ram air power boost to improve high altitude performance, and optional electrically retracting landing gear. Gross weight remained at 2,575 lb (1,168 kg). Certified September 4, 1963. 1,264 total built; 366 (1964), 363 (1965), 473 (1966), and 62 (1967).
- M20E Chaparral, replaced the Super 21 in 1969 with a one-piece windshield, a new power quadrant, and electrical flaps and landing gear as standard. Mooney branding was dropped in 1971, and no Chaparrals were produced in 1972 and 1973. When Chaparral production restarted in 1974, it reverted to the Mooney branding. 184 total built; 73 (1969), 54 (1970), 37 (1974), and 20 (1975).
- Aerostar 201 Chaparral, rebranding of the M20E with an ornamental appendage on the tip of the vertical tail, a streamlined stinger tail cone, and a more efficient engine cooling system. 23 built, all in 1971.

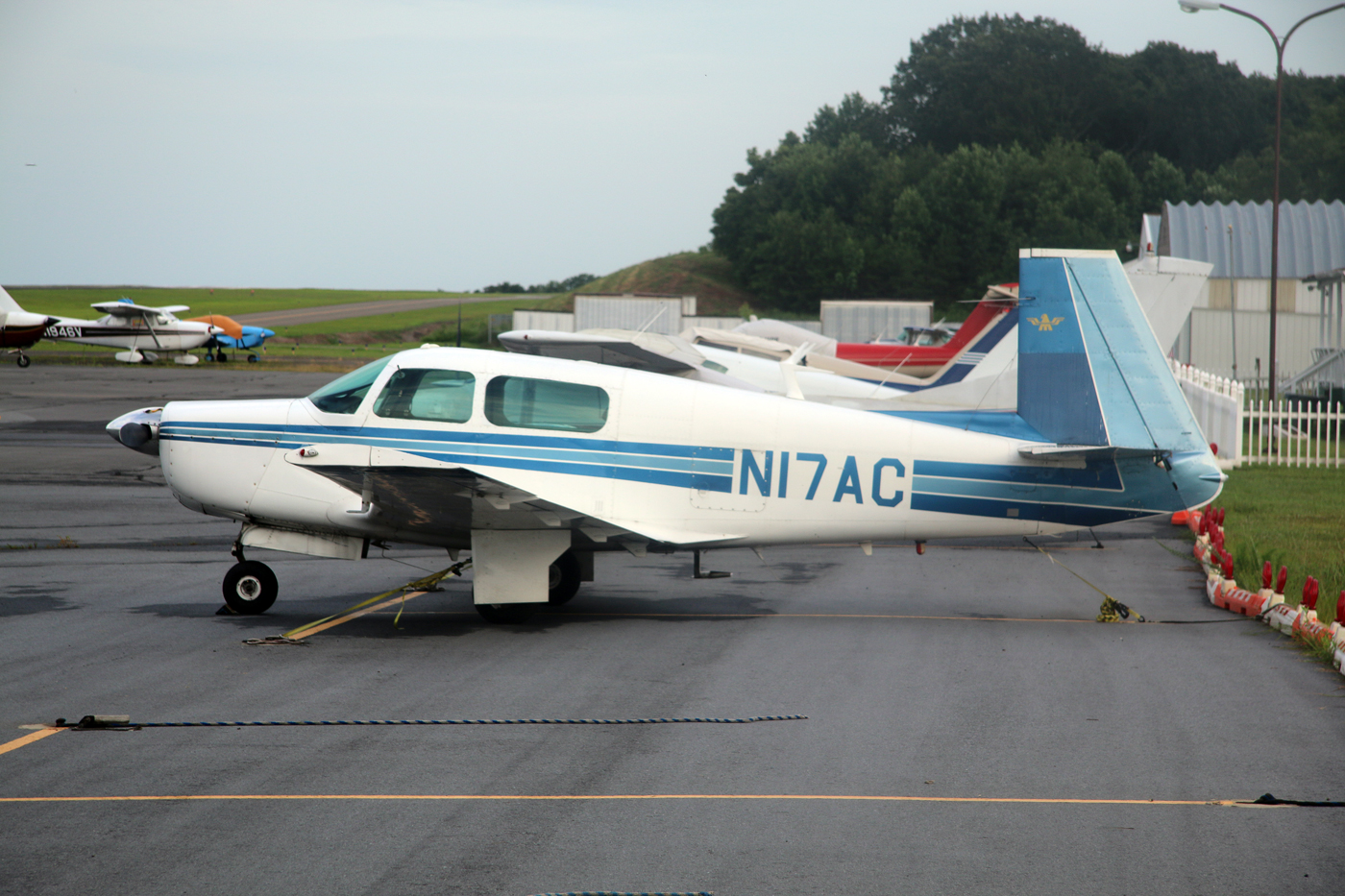
M20F Executive 21 with an elongated rear window

M20F
- M20F Executive 21, stretched M20E introduced in 1967. Powered by the same 200 hp (150 kW) Lycoming IO-360-A1A engine as the Super 21, the M20F's fuselage was lengthened by 1 ft (30 cm), the cabin was stretched by 10 in (25 cm), and gross weight was increased to 2,740 lb (1,240 kg). The 1969 model introduced a one-piece windshield, a new power quadrant, and electrical flaps and landing gear as standard. Certified July 25, 1966. 904 total built; 3 (1966 prototypes), 536 (1967), 208 (1968), 89 (1969), and 68 (1970).
- Aerostar 220 Executive, rebranding of the M20F with an ornamental appendage on the tip of the vertical tail, a streamlined stinger tail cone, and a more efficient engine cooling system. 12 built, all in 1971. No Executives were built in 1972 and 1973.
- M20F Executive, introduced in 1974 with reinstated Mooney branding. 327 total built; 66 (1974), 127 (1975), 127 (1976), and 7 (1977).
M20G Statesman
Stretched M20C introduced in 1968. Powered by the same 180 hp (130 kW) Lycoming O-360-A1D engine as the Ranger, the M20G's fuselage was lengthened by 1 ft (30 cm), the cabin was stretched by 10 in (25 cm) and a third side window was added, and gross weight was decreased to 2,525 lb (1,145 kg). Certified November 13, 1967. 189 total built; 163 (1968), 20 (1969), and 6 (1970).
M20H
Engineering prototype
M20J
- M20J 201, introduced in 1977 to replace the M20F. Powered by a 200 hp (150 kW) Lycoming IO-360-A1B6D engine, the M20J introduced many changes to reduce drag. These changes included a streamlined engine cooling system, landing gear doors that cover the wheel wells, flush airframe access panels, a new exhaust stack, flaps with faired-in hinges and gap seals, and a more efficient McCauley propeller. In 1978, the engine was swapped for a similarly-powered Lycoming IO-360-A3B6D, and a power quadrant replaced the original push-pull engine controls. The 1981 model introduced the redesigned wingtips of the M20K to the M20J, as well as improved soundproofing. Soundproofing was further improved in 1982 with the addition of double-pane door windows as well as extra stiffeners and insulation in the cabin. The 1984 model introduced improved instrument and circuit breaker panels and a streamlined composite belly panel. Wing-mounted air brakes were made available as an option in 1985. In 1989, the interior was redesigned to improve comfort, a 28V electrical system and electrically-operated cowl flaps were added, and the windows were revised with rounded corners. Certified September 27, 1976. A total of 1,723 were built from 1977 to 1987 and 1989 to 1990, including 201LM, 201SE, and MSE versions; 337 (1977), 380 (1978), 137 (1979), 137 (1980), 176 (1981), 113 (1982), 91 (1983), 82 (1984), 51 (1985), 37 (1986), 53 (1987), 65 (1989), and 64 (1990).
- M20J 201LM, "Lean Machine" version introduced in 1985. As M20J 201 but with simplified equipment package. Production figures between 1985 and 1987 were grouped with the standard M20J 201, while 44 201LMs were built in 1988.
- M20J 201SE, "Special Edition" version introduced in 1985. As M20J 201 but with a luxury interior. Production figures were grouped with the standard M20J 201.
- M20J 201AT, "Advanced Trainer" introduced in 1989 with a 14V electrical system, manually-operated cowl flaps, and a more durable interior. 22 total produced between 1989 and 1991; 1 (1989), 20 (1990), and 1 (1991 demonstrator). In 1992, the aircraft was redesignated to M20J AT for its final year of production. Production figures for the final year were grouped with the M20J MSE.
- M20J 205, introduced in 1987. As M20J 201 but with airframe changes from the M20K 252 which increased its top speed by 4 kn (7.4 km/h; 4.6 mph). Other changes included a 28V electrical system and revised windows with rounded corners. 57 built.
- M20J 205SE, "Special Edition" version introduced in 1988. As M20J 205 but with a luxury interior. 22 built.
- M20J MSE, replaced the M20J 201 in May 1990 with numerous improvements taken from the higher-priced models. 1990 production figures were grouped with the M20J 201. 205 total produced between 1991 and 1997, including the MSE Limited and M20J AT; 38 (1991), 41 (1992), 34 (1993), 34 (1994), 19 (1995), 19 (1996), and 20 (1997).
- M20J MSE Limited, introduced in 1991. As M20J MSE but with packaged optional equipment. Produced from 1991 to 1993, but production figures were grouped with the standard MSE.
- M20J Allegro, renamed MSE for final year of production in 1998. 19 built.

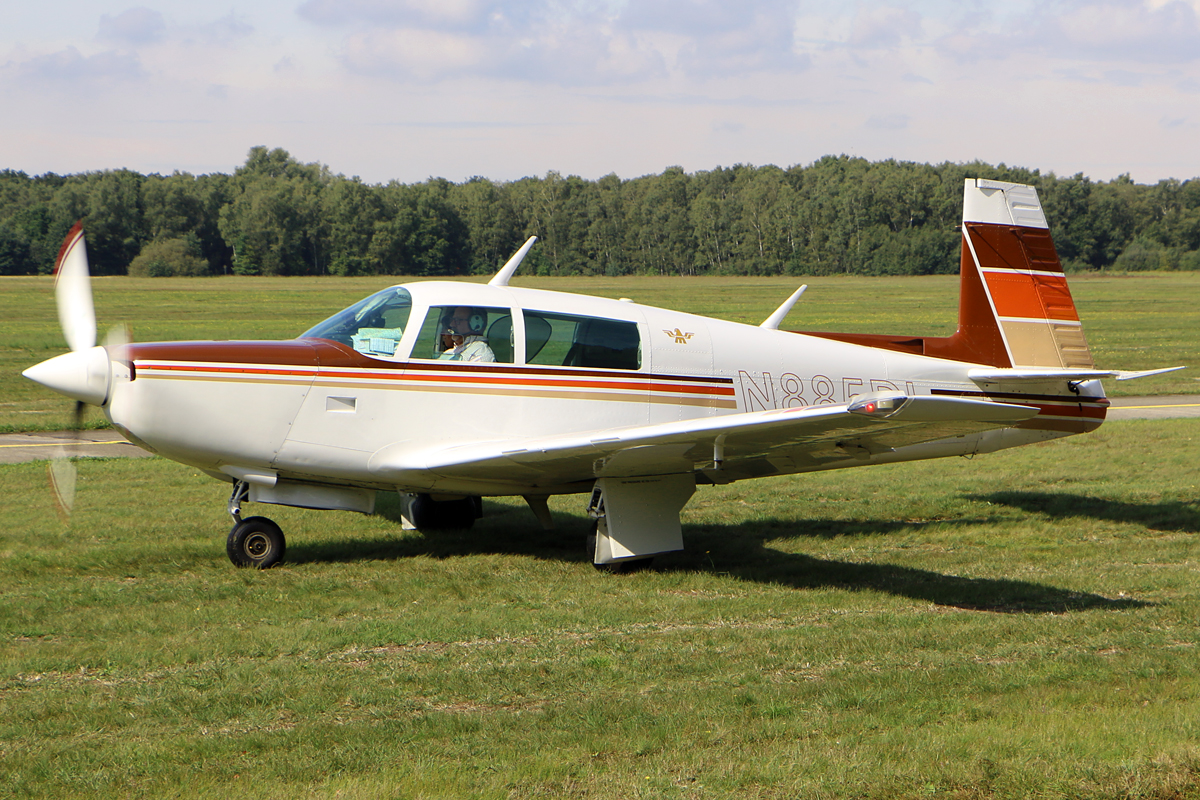
M20K 231

M20K
- M20K 231, introduced in 1979. The first production M20 variant to feature a six-cylinder engine, the M20K 231 is powered by a 210 hp (160 kW) Continental TSIO-360-GB engine with a Rajay turbocharger and push-pull power controls. Fuel capacity was increased to 75 US gal (280 L), a dorsal fin air scoop was added to cool the cabin, and new curved wingtips were introduced. The 1981 model featured improved soundproofing, which was further improved in 1982 along with the addition of a new exhaust resonator and pressurized magnetos. In 1984, the engine was swapped for the 210 hp (160 kW) Continental TSIO-360-LB1B, and the improvements from that year's M20J were added as well. The 1985 model also introduced the changes from its M20J counterpart. Certified November 16, 1978. 888 total built, including the 231SE; 246 (1979), 199 (1980), 166 (1981), 105 (1982), 63 (1983), 61 (1984), and 48 (1985).
- M20K 231SE, "Special Edition" version introduced in 1985. As M20K 231 but with a luxury interior. Production figures were grouped with the standard M20K 231.
- M20K 252TSE, replaced the 231 in 1986. Powered by a 210 hp (160 kW) Continental TSIO-360-MB1 with a Garrett variable wastegate controller, the 252TSE also introduced curved side windows. There were no significant changes during the aircraft's five-year production run. 230 total built, 66 (1986), 89 (1987), 35 (1988), 22 (1989), 10 (1990), and 8 (1997).
- M20K Encore, introduced in 1997 with a 220 hp (160 kW) Continental TSIO-360-MB7B. Gross weight was increased, and the landing gear from the M20M and M20R was installed to compensate. Gross weight was increased to 3,130 lb (1,420 kg). 27 total built; 9 (1997) and 18 (1998).
M20L PFM
Introduced in 1988 and produced for only two years. Powered by a 217 hp (162 kW) Porsche PFM 3200 N03, the M20L's fuselage was lengthened by 20 in (51 cm) to maintain balance. Likewise, the cabin was lengthened by 12 in (30 cm). Gross weight was increased to 2,900 lb (1,300 kg). Certified February 25, 1988. 41 total built; 40 (1988) and 1 (1989).
M20M
- M20M TLS, introduced in 1989. Powered by a 270 hp (200 kW) Lycoming TIO-540-AF1A engine, the M20M features the stretched fuselage of the M20L. The rear seats were moved aft by 4 in (10 cm) to improve leg room. Gross weight was increased to 3,200 lb (1,500 kg). The 1996 model introduced an option for a TKS ice protection system, which could be retrofitted to older M20Ms. Certified June 28, 1989. A total of 218 were built from 1989 to 1996, including the 1996 TLS Brao; 35 (1989), 45 (1990), 42 (1991), 22 (1992), 27 (1993), 20 (1994), 18 (1995), and 9 (1996).
- M20M TLS Bravo, replaced the TLS halfway through 1996. As TLS but with a 270 hp (200 kW) Lycoming TIO-540-AF1B engine. The 2000 model introduced a dual Garmin 430 panel, a KFC-225 autopilot, and a leather interior. The dual Garmin 430 panel was replaced with a similar Garmin 530/430 panel in 2001. 1996 production figures were grouped with the TLS, while a total of 110 TLS Bravos were built between 1997 and 2004; 20 (1997), 17 (1998), 25 (1999), 26 (2000), 7 (2001), 7 (2003), and 8 (2004).
- M20M Bravo GX, introduced in 2005. As TLS Bravo but with a Garmin GX1000 glass cockpit and a three-bladed McCauley propeller. 20 built in 2005.

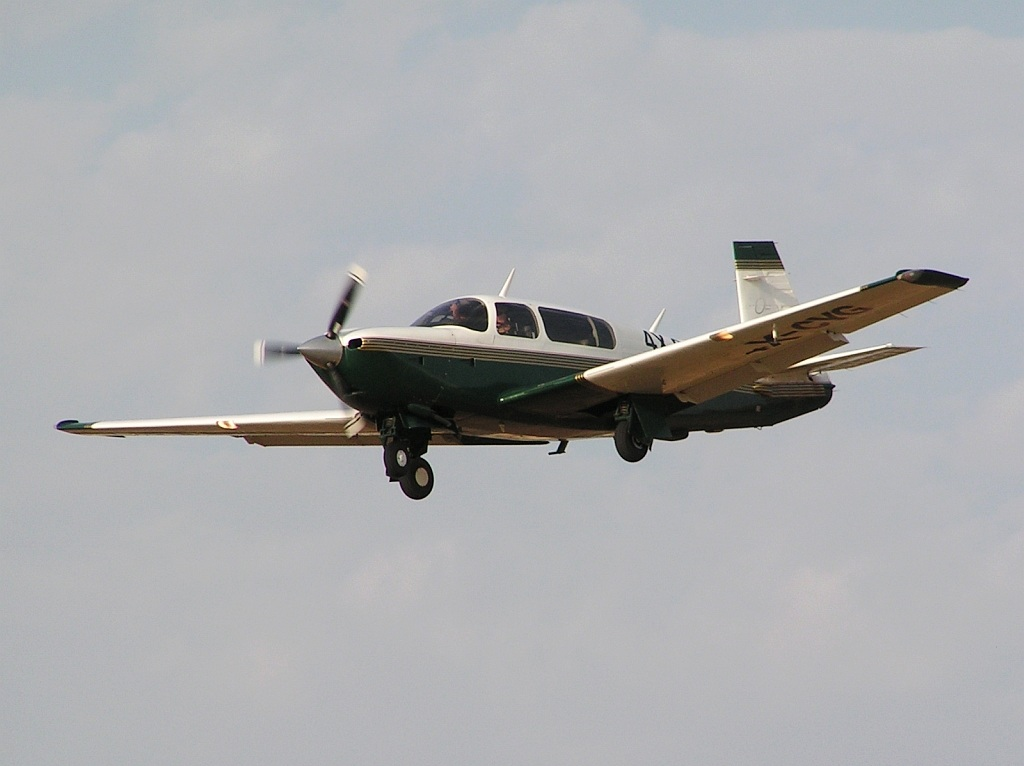
M20R Ovation

M20R
- M20R Ovation, introduced in 1994 with a 280 hp (210 kW) Continental IO-550-G engine. The 1996 model introduced an option for a TKS ice protection system, which could be retrofitted to older M20Rs. Certified June 30, 1994. 199 total built; 21 (1994), 54 (1995), 20 (1996), 36 (1997), 41 (1998), and 27 (1999).
- M20R Ovation 2, introduced in 2000. As Ovation but with a dual Garmin 430 panel, a KFC-225 autopilot, a leather interior, and a two-bladed McCauley propeller. The dual Garmin 430 panel was replaced with a similar Garmin 530/430 panel in 2001. A limited Platinum Edition was offered with advanced avionics and airframe and cabin upgrades. 131 total built; 55 (2000), 12 (2001), 8 (2002), 28 (2003), and 28 (2004).
- M20R Ovation 2 DX, introduced in 2005 alongside the Ovation 2 GX. One built in 2005.
- M20R Ovation 2 GX, introduced in 2005 alongside the Ovation 2 DX. As Ovation 2 but with a Garmin GX1000 glass cockpit and a three-bladed Hartzell propeller. 64 built in 2005. The 11,000th Mooney delivered from the factory was a 2006 Ovation 2 GX.
- M20R Ovation 3, introduced in June 2006. As Ovation 2 GX but powered by a 310 hp (230 kW) Continental IO-550-G/AP engine. At least 6 built.
M20S
- M20S Eagle, introduced in 1999. Powered by a 244 hp (182 kW) Continental IO-550-G engine, the Eagle also features Moritz gauges, a two-axis S-TEC autopilot, and 75 US gal (280 L) fuel tanks. Certified March 7, 1999. 58 total built; 39 (1999) and 19 (2000).
- M20S Eagle 2, introduced in 2001. As Eagle but with a three-bladed propeller, a Garmin GNS430 system, a leather interior, rudder trim, and a ground power plug. 9 total built; 6 (2001), 2 (2002), and 1 (2003).
M20T Predator
Military trainer variant designed for the United States Air Force Enhanced Flight Screener (EFS) competition in 1991. Based on the M20J, the Predator is powered by a 260 hp (190 kW) Lycoming AEIO-540-D4B5 engine with the firewall moved 5 in (13 cm) back. The cabin was replaced with a two-seat cockpit with a sliding bubble canopy, and the vertical stabilizer was lengthened by 6 in (15 cm). Only a single prototype was built.
M20TN
- M20TN Acclaim, circular engine cooling intakes and winglets. Certified December 22, 2006. Of the 143 M20TNs built, the first 89 were the original Acclaim.
- M20TN Acclaim Type S, announced in September 2007. As Acclaim but with modified wingtips, a streamlined cowling with enlarged engine cooling intakes, and other improvements.
M20U Ovation Ultra
Development of the M20R with cabin doors on both sides of the fuselage, a Garmin G1000 NXi glass cockpit, and other improvements. Certified March 28, 2017.
M20V Acclaim Ultra
Development of the M20TN with cabin doors on both sides of the fuselage, a Garmin G1000 NXi glass cockpit, and other improvements. Certified March 28, 2017.
MT20 TX-1
Military trainer variant based on the M20J with a sliding clear-view roof canopy. The TX-1 was powered by a 240 hp (180 kW) Continental TSIO-360-GB engine driving a two-bladed propeller and had four hardpoints under the wings for weapons training and light attack missions. Demand for the aircraft was too low to justify production, and only a single prototype was built.
M22 Mark 22
Twin-engine development of the M20 with strengthened wings, an enlarged vertical stabilizer, and powered by two 180 hp (130 kW) Lycoming O-360 engines. One prototype was built in 1958, but further development was abandoned after flight testing. Not to be confused with the unrelated Mooney M22 Mustang.
Rocket 305
In 1990, Rocket Engineering Corp. of Spokane, Washington, modified an M20K 231 model by replacing the standard turbocharged 210 hp (160 kW) Continental TSIO-360 engine and two-blade propeller with a turbocharged 305 hp (227 kW) Continental TSIO-520-NB and a McCauley three-blade propeller. This engine and propeller combination had previously been proven on the twin-engined Cessna 340 and Cessna 414. Marketed as the Rocket 305, this variant delivered a 228-knot speed and 1,600 feet/minute rate of climb. By September 2017, the Rocket conversion had been discontinued by Rocket Engineering.

== Aircraft on display ==
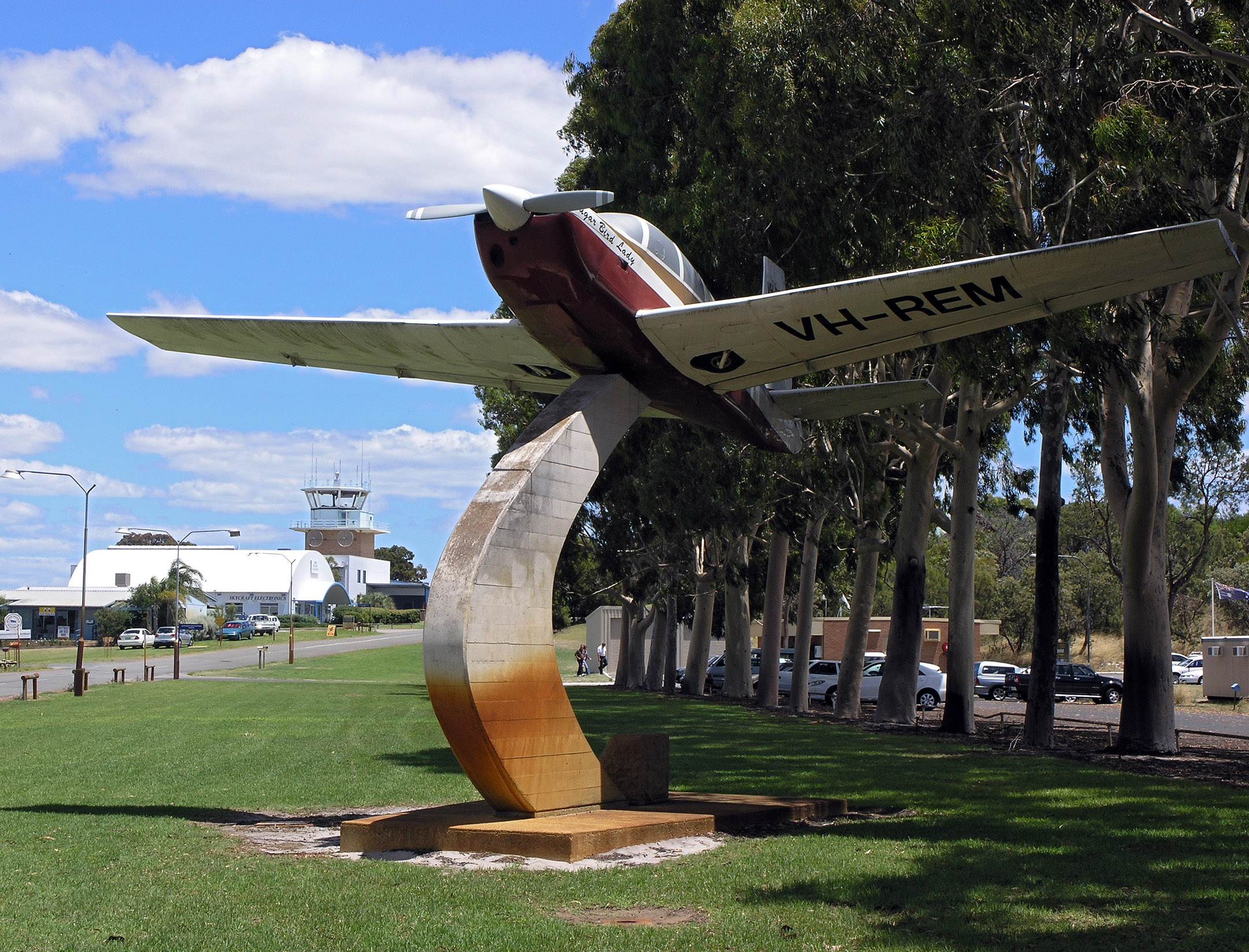
Mooney M20H preserved near Jandakot Airport as part of a memorial to Robin Miller

The Mooney M20H engineering prototype is on display at Jandakot Airport in Jandakot, Western Australia. The aircraft is painted to represent the M20E used by Robin Miller, an Australian female pilot known as the "Sugar Bird Lady" for her work in distributing the polio vaccine across Australia.

== Specifications ==
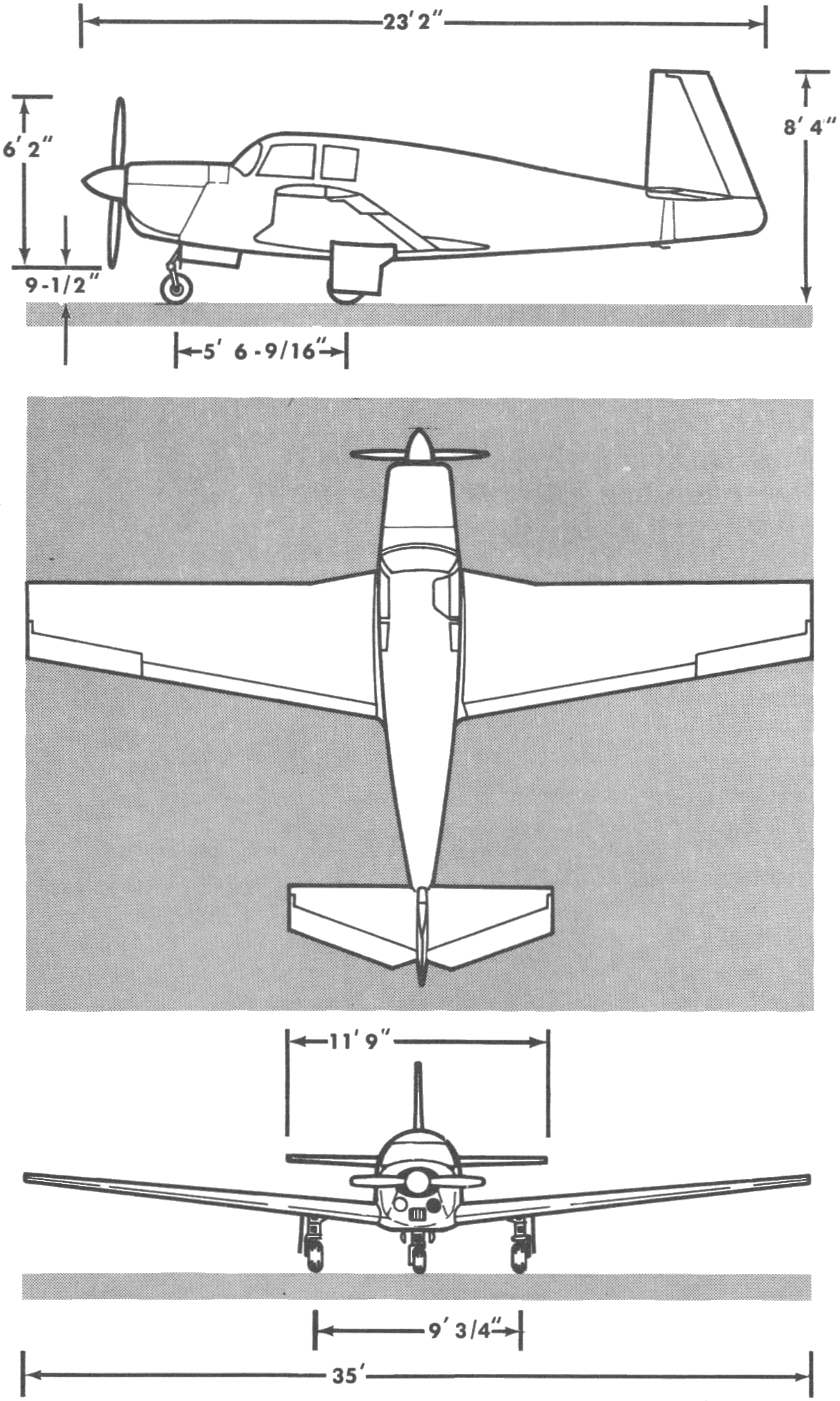
3-view line drawing of the Mooney M20C Ranger

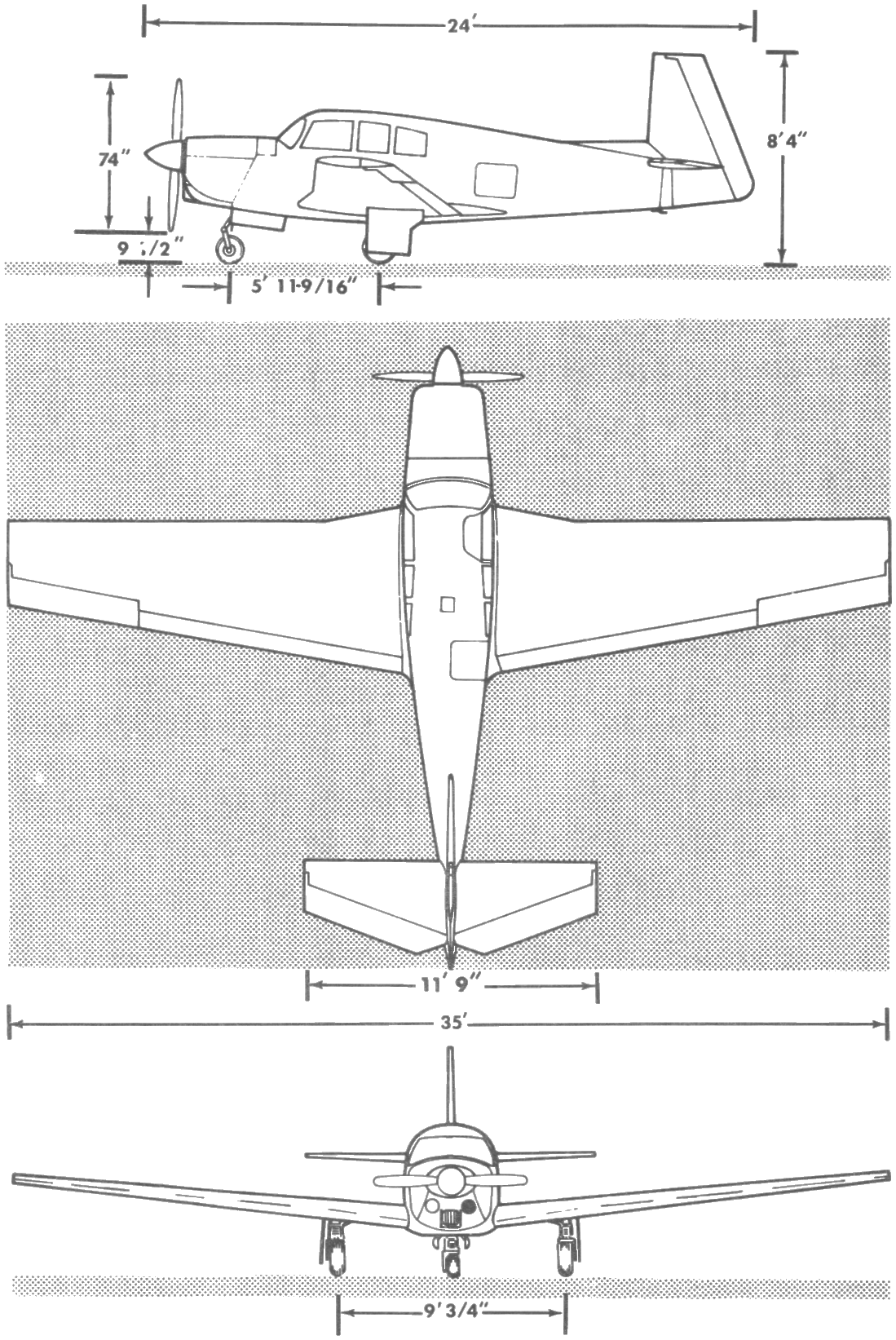
3-view line drawing of the Mooney M20G Statesman

These are the specifications for the 2016 M20 Acclaim Ultra.

Data from Mooney website

General characteristics

- Crew: one
- Capacity: 1,000 lb (454 kg) useful load or three passengers
- Length: 26 ft 8 in (8.13 m)
- Wingspan: 36 ft 6 in (11.13 m)
- Height: 8 ft 4 in (2.54 m)
- Empty weight: 2,380 lb (1,080 kg)
- Gross weight: 3,380 lb (1,533 kg)
- Max takeoff weight: 3,368 lb (1,528 kg)
- Powerplant: 1 × Continental TSIO-550-G air-cooled, 6-cylinder, horizontally opposed piston engine, 280 hp (209 kW)
- Propellers: 3-bladed Hartzell Scimitar Three-Blade

Performance

- Maximum speed: 242 kn (278 mph, 448 km/h)
- Cruise speed: 175 kn (201 mph, 324 km/h) (TAS)
- Stall speed: 53 kn (61 mph, 98 km/h)
- Range: 1,100 nmi (1,300 mi, 2,000 km) (standard tanks)
- Service ceiling: 25,000 ft (7,600 m)

== See also ==
Aircraft of comparable role, configuration, and era

- Beechcraft Bonanza
- Cirrus SR22
