= Morane-Saulnier MS.147 =

MS.147, MS.148, and MS.149
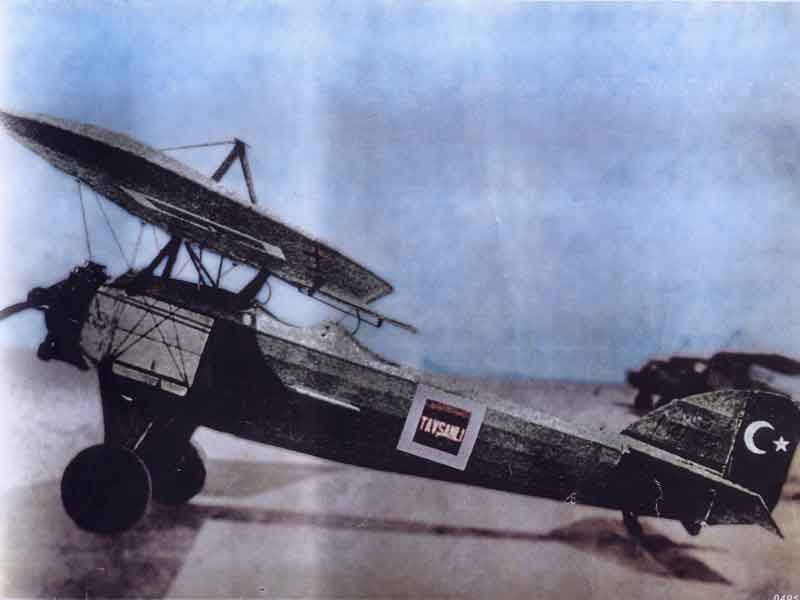

General information
- Type: Trainer
- National origin: France
- Manufacturer: Morane-Saulnier
- Number built: 166

History
- First flight: 1928

The Morane-Saulnier MS.147 and its derivatives, the MS.148 and MS.149 were a family of trainer aircraft produced in France in the late 1920s for civil and military use. They were derived from other machines in Morane-Saulnier's successful line of monoplane trainers, combining the wire-braced parasol wing of the MS.138 with the fuselage and undercarriage of the MS.130.

The various subtypes saw service with the Aéronavale, Aéropostale, and a number of foreign air arms. They were largely withdrawn from French military service by 1935.

== Variants ==
MS.147
production version with Salmson 9Ac engine (106 built)
MS.147P
mailplane version for Aéropostale (3 built)
MS.148
version with Salmson 7Ac engine (1 built)
MS.149
version with Lorraine 5Pa engine for Aéronavale (56 built)

== Operators ==
France

- Aéronavale (56 × MS.149)
- Aéropostale (3 × MS.147P)

Brazil

- (30 × MS.147)

Greece

- Hellenic Air Force (5 × MS.147)

Guatemala

- Guatemalan Air Force

Turkey

- Turkish Air Force

Venezuela

- Venezuelan Air Force (MS.147)

== Specifications (MS.147) ==
Data from Jane's all the World's Aircraft 1928, Aviafrance:Morane-Saulnier MoS-147

General characteristics

- Crew: 2
- Length: 7 m (23 ft 0 in)
- Wingspan: 10.9 m (35 ft 9 in)
- Height: 3.69 m (12 ft 1 in)
- Wing area: 19.3 m^{2} (208 sq ft)
- Empty weight: 584 kg (1,287 lb)
- Gross weight: 850 kg (1,874 lb)
- Powerplant: 1 × Salmson 9Ac 9-cylinder air-cooled radial piston engine, 89 kW (120 hp)
- Propellers: 2-bladed fixed pitch propeller

Performance

- Maximum speed: 145 km/h (90 mph, 78 kn)
- Wing loading: 43.6 kg/m^{2} (8.9 lb/sq ft)
- Power/mass: 0.1067 kW/kg (0.0649 hp/lb)

== See also ==
Related lists

- List of Interwar military aircraft
