= Morane-Saulnier P =

French WW1 reconnaissance aircraft

Type P/MS.21/MS.24/MS.26
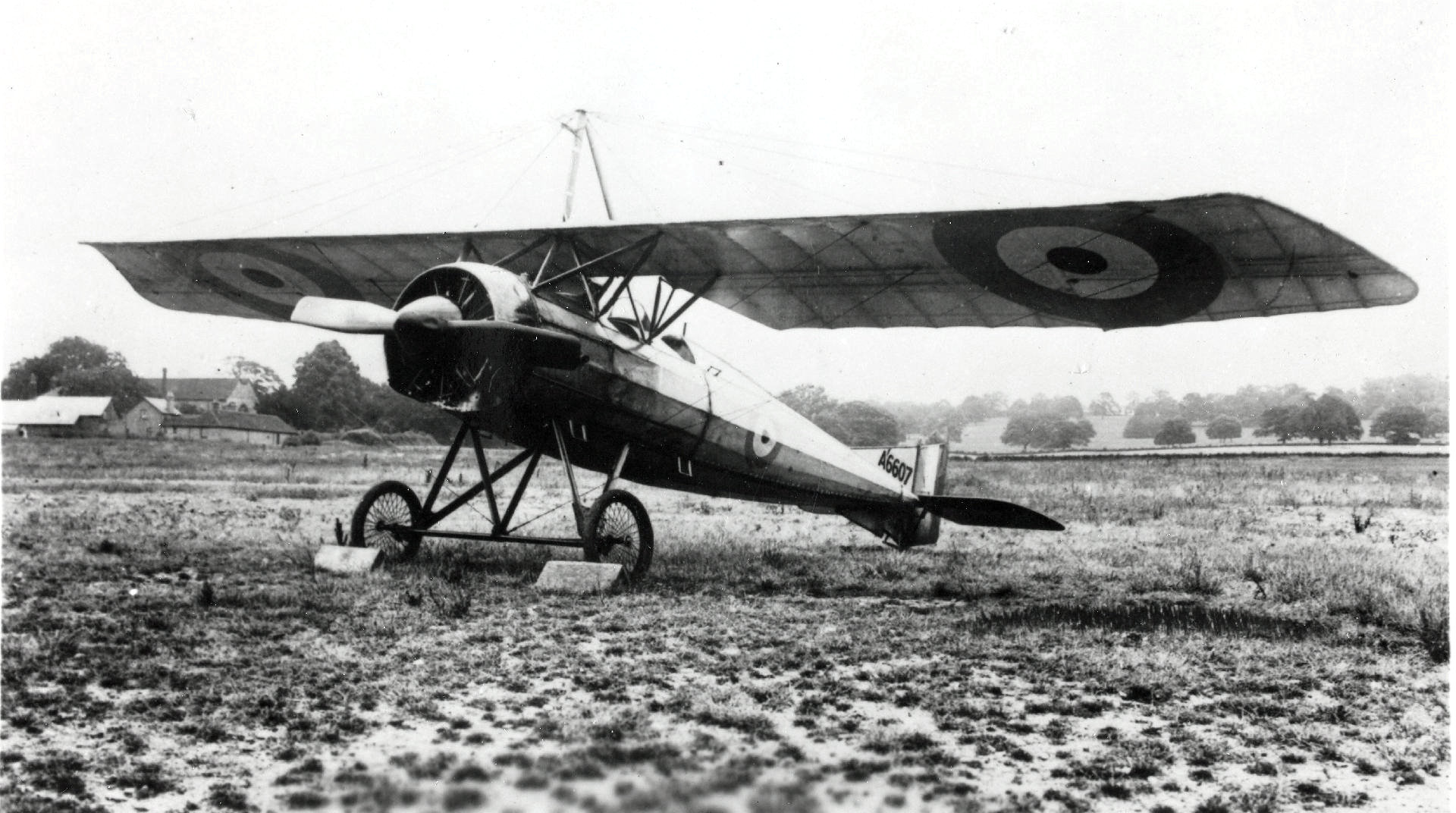
- Royal Flying Corps MS.24 Type P

General information
- Type: Reconnaissance
- Manufacturer: Aéroplanes Morane-Saulnier
- Primary users: Aéronautique Militaire Royal Flying Corps
- Number built: 595

History
- Introduction date: 1916
- First flight: 1916

The Morane-Saulnier Type P (official designations MS.21, MS.24 and MS.26) was a French parasol wing two-seat reconnaissance aeroplane of the First World War. Morane-Saulnier built 595 for the French air force, and it was also used by the British until 1916–17.

== Development ==
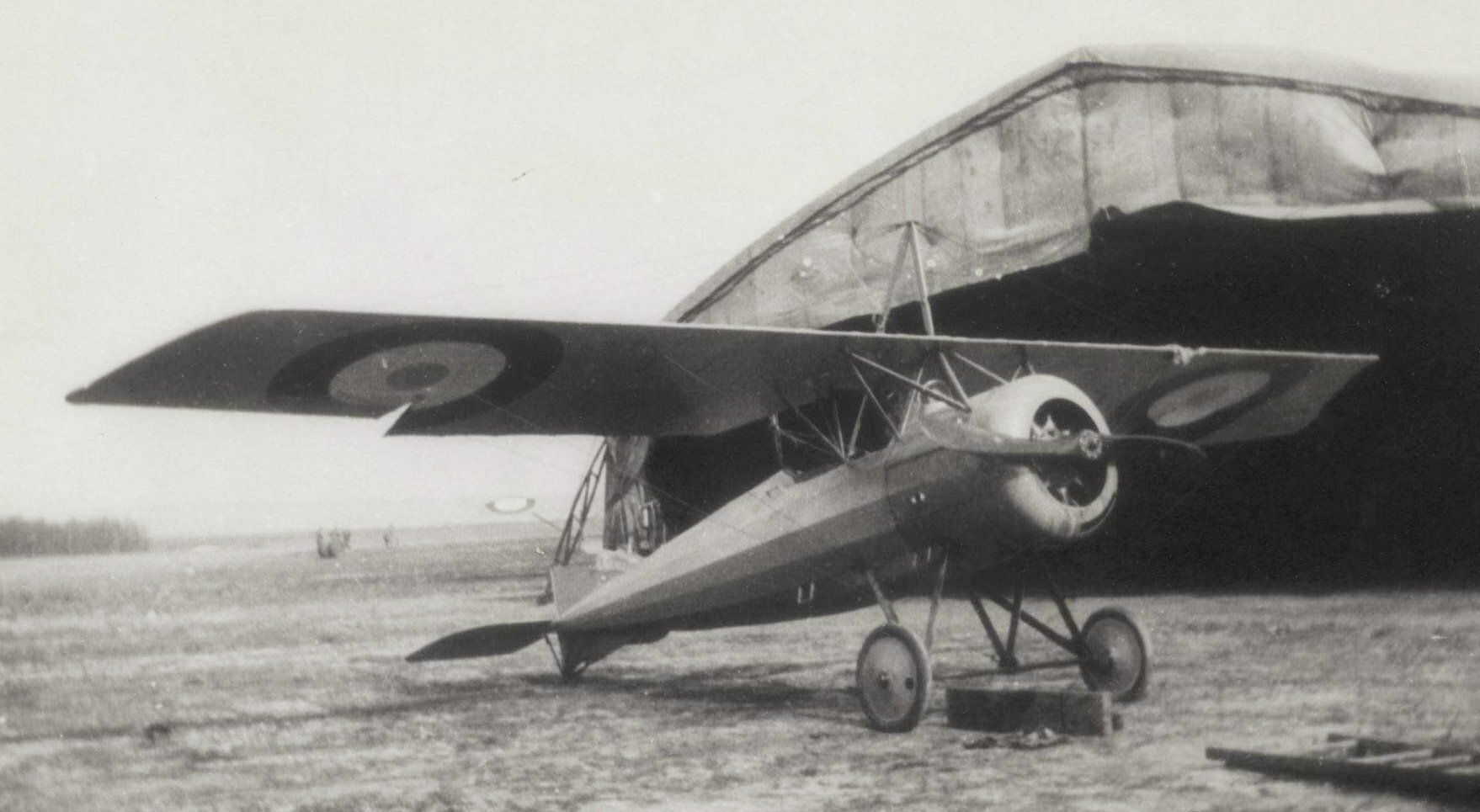
French Morane-Saulnier P (MS.26) at Aisne, April 1917

In addition to being fitted with ailerons and having a more streamlined fuselage, the Type P was faster and better armed than its better known ancestor, the Type L (MS.3) and had a more developed structure compared to the intermediate Morane-Saulnier LA (MS.4).

Three versions were built under Morane-Saulnier's factory designation of Type P, the first being the MS.21, which although externally similar to the Type LA, had its internal structure completely redesigned, with the most visible evidence being the more robust center section struts, and with other details borrowed from the Type N (MS.5), such as a substantial spinner, known as the "casserole".

The MS.24 was built specifically for the Royal Flying Corps to operate alongside their Morane-Saulnier LAs while replacing those lost to attrition, but due to shortages of the 110 hp (82 kW) Le Rhône rotary engine used in the MS.21, it was powered by an 80 hp (60 kW) Le Rhône. The RFC also operated the MS.21.

The MS.26 was similar to the MS.21, but was fitted with a 120 hp (89 kW) Le Rhône engine which was enclosed in a full cowling, and like the 24, dispensed with the spinner commonly found on the MS.21.

== Variants ==
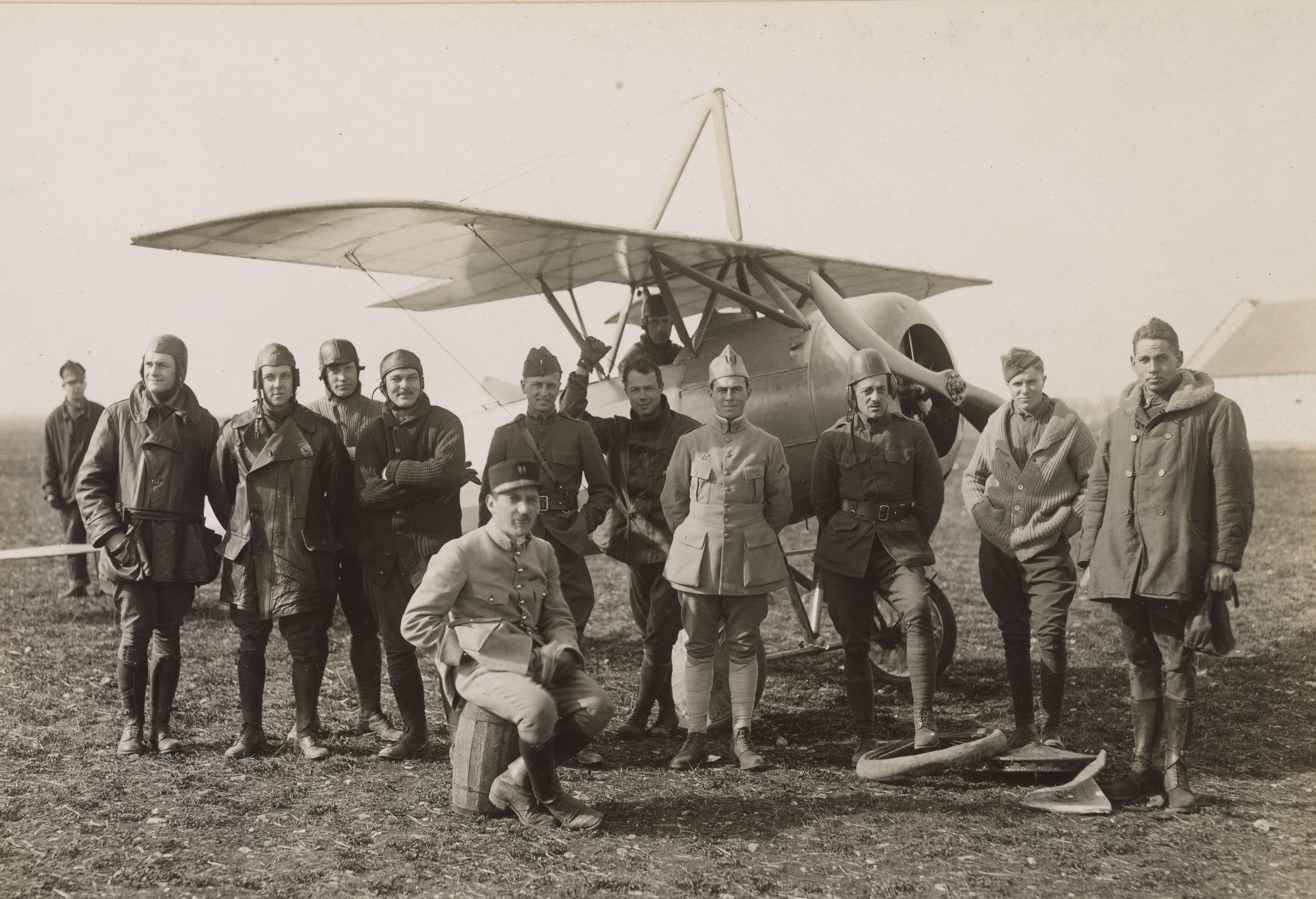
Morane-Saulnier MS.26/type P rouleur trainer

Type P

- Factory designation

MS.21

- Official designation of initial version powered with a 110 hp (82 kW) Le Rhône 9J engine

MS.24

- Official designation of RFC version powered with an 80 hp (60 kW) Le Rhône 9C engine

MS.26

- Official designation of final version powered with a 120 hp (89 kW) Le Rhône 9Jc engine

Rouleur/Penguin

- Examples of other variants modified with wing area reduced to act as ground handling trainers.

Chasseur

- Two examples were converted into single seat fighters, the first had the observer's position covered over, the second had the pilot moved back and the wing lowered.

== Operators ==
Brazil

- Brazilian Air Force

France

- French Air Force

Japan

- Imperial Japanese Army Air Service

Russia

- Imperial Russian Air Service

United Kingdom

- Royal Flying Corps

== Specifications (Type P/MS.21) ==
Data from The Aeroplanes of the Royal Flying Corps (Military Wing)

General characteristics

- Crew: 2
- Length: 7.2 m (23 ft 7 in)
- Wingspan: 11.2 m (36 ft 9 in)
- Height: 3.47 m (11 ft 5 in)
- Wing area: 18 m^{2} (190 sq ft)
- Empty weight: 433 kg (955 lb)
- Gross weight: 733 kg (1,616 lb)
- Powerplant: 1 × Le Rhone 9J 9-cylinder air-cooled rotary piston engine, 82 kW (110 hp)
- Propellers: 2-bladed fixed-pitch propeller

Performance

- Maximum speed: 156 km/h (97 mph, 84 kn) at 2,000 m (6,600 ft)
- Endurance: 2 hours 30 minutes
- Service ceiling: 4,800 m (15,700 ft)
- Time to altitude: 3,000 m (9,800 ft) in 15 minutes 50 seconds

Armament

- Guns: 1 × Vickers machine gun and 1× Lewis gun or 2× Lewis guns
- Bombs: Light load of bombs

== See also ==
Related development

- Morane-Saulnier Type LA

Related lists

- List of military aircraft of France
