= Morane-Saulnier MS.130 =

MS.129 and MS.130–MS.134
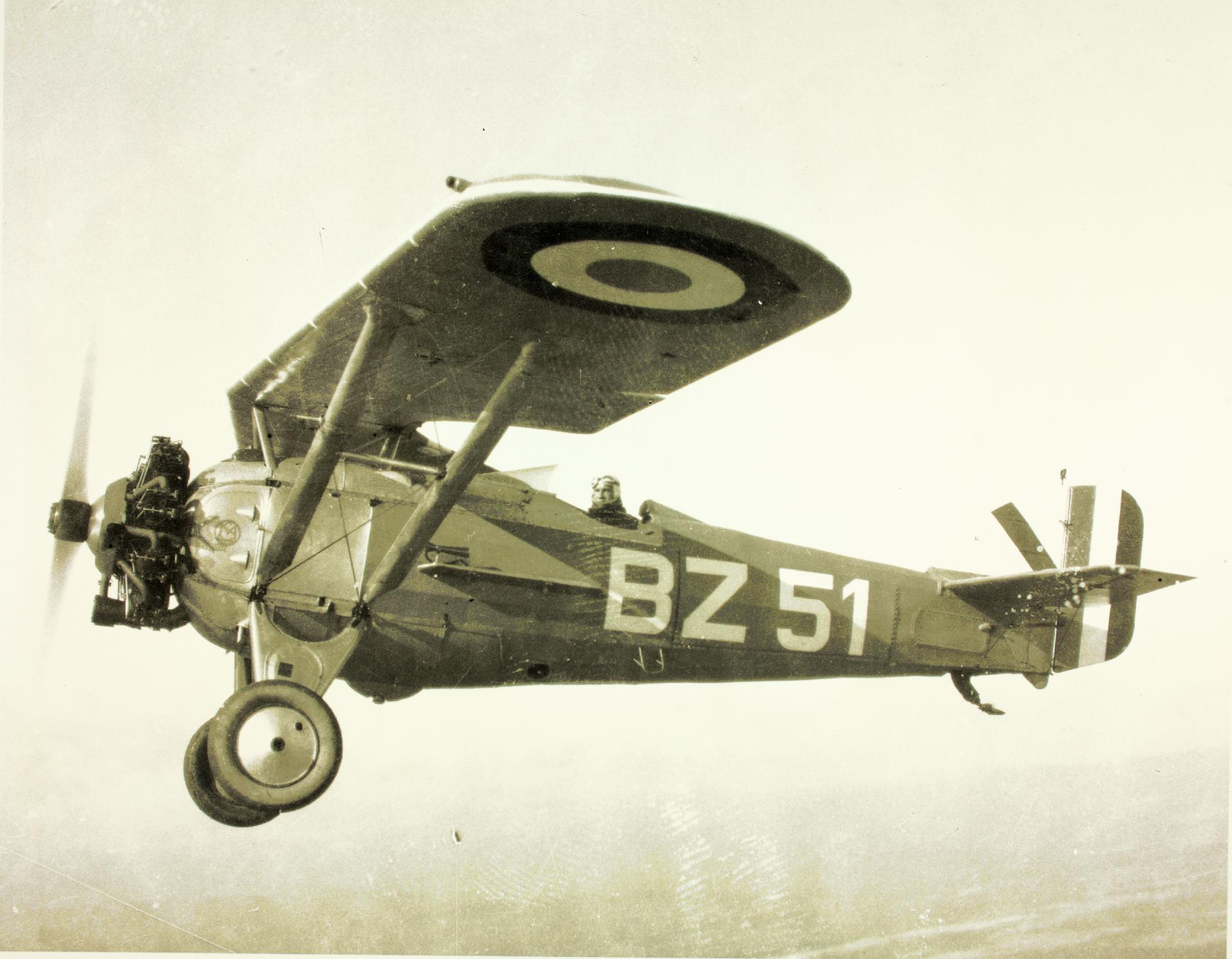

General information
- Type: Military trainer
- National origin: France
- Manufacturer: Morane-Saulnier
- Primary user: French Navy
- Number built: >150

History
- First flight: 1925

The Morane-Saulnier MS.129 and its derivatives in the MS.130 series were a family of military trainer aircraft produced in France in the 1920s.

== Design and development ==
The MS.129 and 130 were conventional, parasol-wing monoplanes with open cockpits in tandem and fixed tailskid undercarriage. The initial version, the MS.129, was produced in small numbers for the Romanian Air Force and civil users, but the major production version was the MS.130, which equipped the French Navy and a number of foreign air arms.

The second MS.130 prototype won the 1929 Coupe Michelin, flown by Michel Detroyat with an average speed of 190 km/h (120 mph).

The MS.130 was further developed as the MS.230, and at least two MS.130s were later rebuilt to this new standard.

== Variants ==
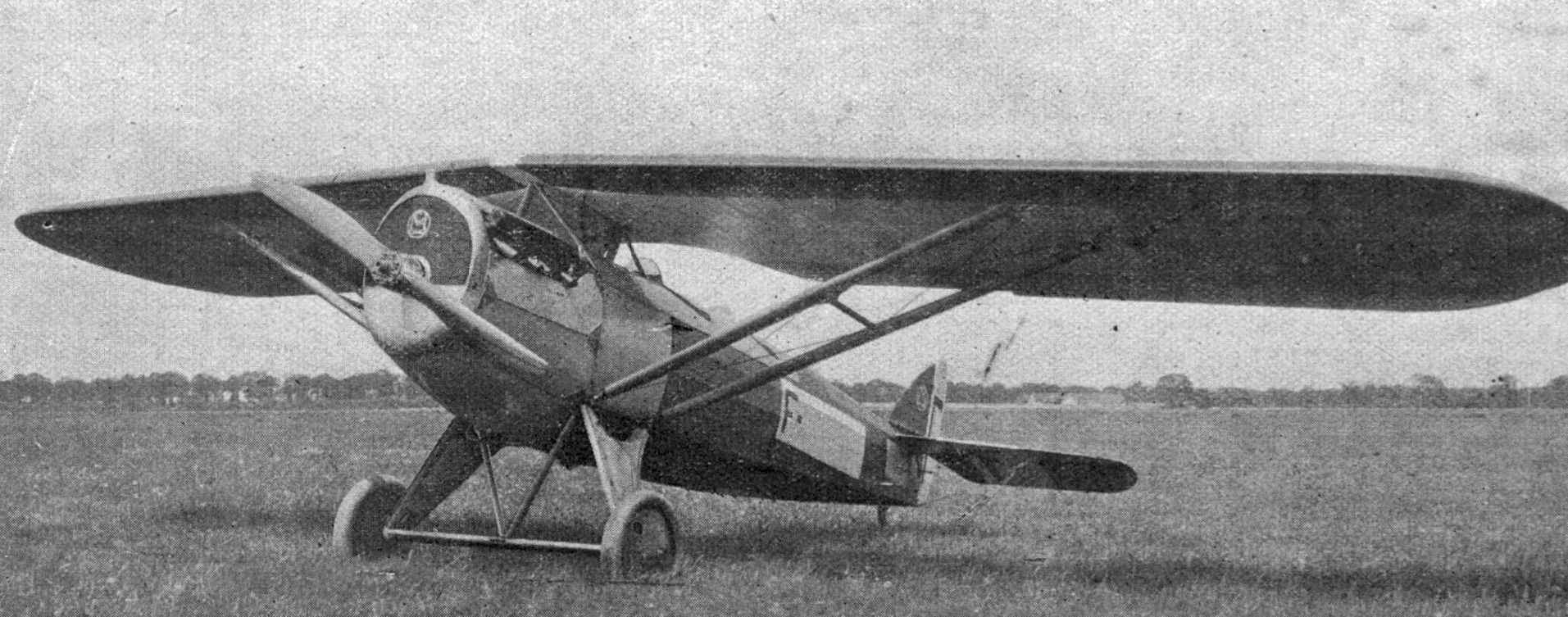
Morane-Saulnier MS.129 photo from L'Aéronautique December,1926

MS.129
initial production version with Hispano-Suiza 8Ab engine.
MS.130
major production version with Salmson 9AB engine; 146 built.
MS.130 Coupe Michelin

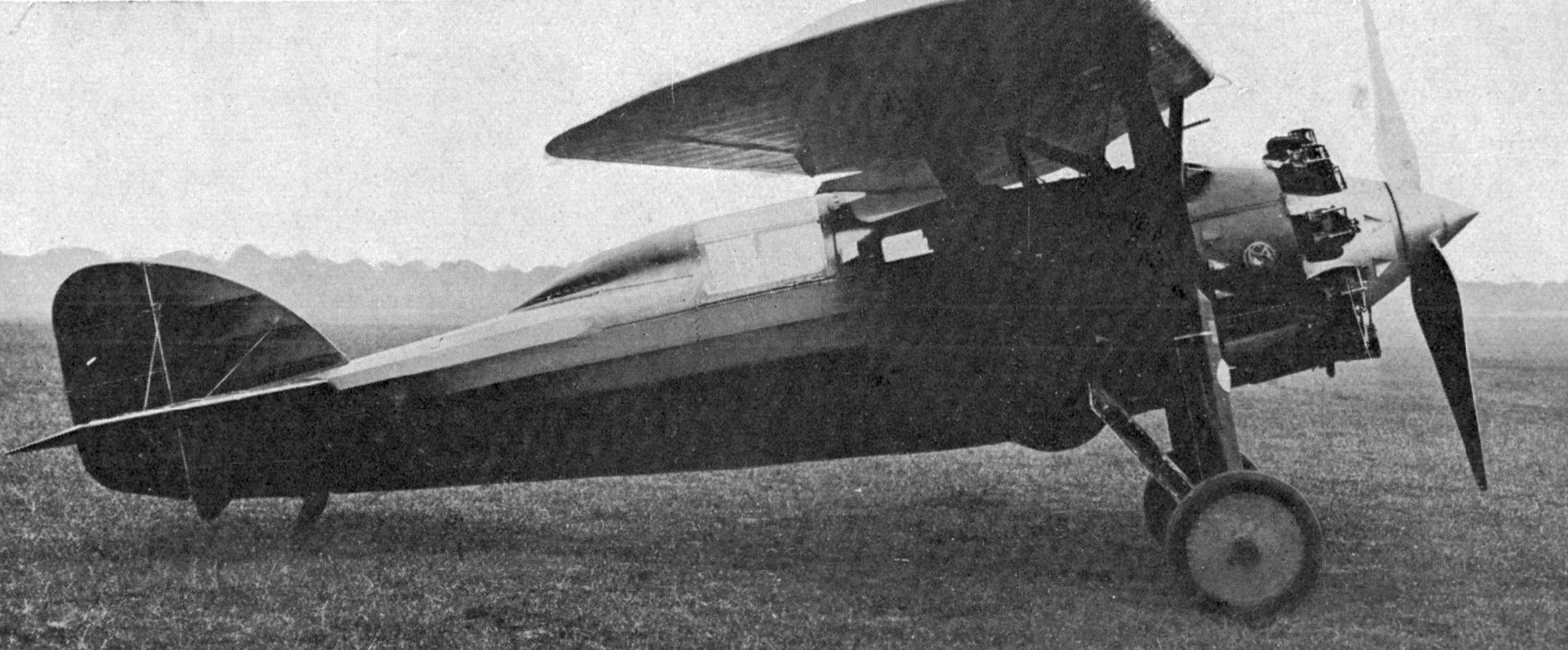
Morane-Saulnier MS.130 flown in the 1929 Coupe Michelin by Michel Détroyat. Photo from L'Aéronautique July,1929

A single aircraft modified for competing in the Coupe Michelin 1929, which Michel Détroyat won at 190.203 km/h (118.187 mph; 102.701 kn).
MS.131
MS.130 converted to use a 230 hp (170 kW) Lorraine 7Me engine (1 converted for US military attaché in Paris)
MS.132
version with Salmson 7Ac engine for French Navy; 5 built.
MS.133
version with Gnome-Rhône 5Kc engine; 3 converted from MS.129, 1 converted from MS.130.
MS.134
conversion of MS.130 with Clerget 9B engine

The MS.135, MS.136, MS.137, MS.138, and MS.139 were of a different design derived from the MS.35, and not related to the MS.130.

== Operators ==
- France France
  - Aéronavale (MS.130)
  - Aéronautique Militaire (MS.130)
- Brazil Brazil (15 × MS.130)
  - Brazilian Air Force
  - Varig (MS.130)
- Belgium Belgium (2 × MS.130)
- China (MS.130)
- Guatemala (MS.130)
- Portugal
  - Portuguese Air Force (1 x MS.130, 4 x MS.133)
- Romania (MS.129)
- Turkey (MS.130)

== Specifications (MS.130) ==
Data from The Illustrated Encyclopedia of Aircraft 2554

General characteristics

- Crew: Two, pilot and instructor
- Length: 6.97 m (22 ft 10 in)
- Wingspan: 10.70 m (35 ft 1 in)
- Height: 2.85 m (9 ft 4 in)
- Wing area: 19.7 m^{2} (212 sq ft)
- Empty weight: 793 kg (1,740 lb)
- Gross weight: 1,149 kg (2,528 lb)
- Powerplant: 1 × Salmson 9Ab , 170 kW (230 hp)

Performance

- Maximum speed: 208 km/h (130 mph, 110 kn)
- Range: 510 km (320 mi, 280 nmi)
- Service ceiling: 5,000 m (16,000 ft)

== See also ==
Related lists

- List of Interwar military aircraft
