= Morane-Saulnier MS.152 =

Aircraft development

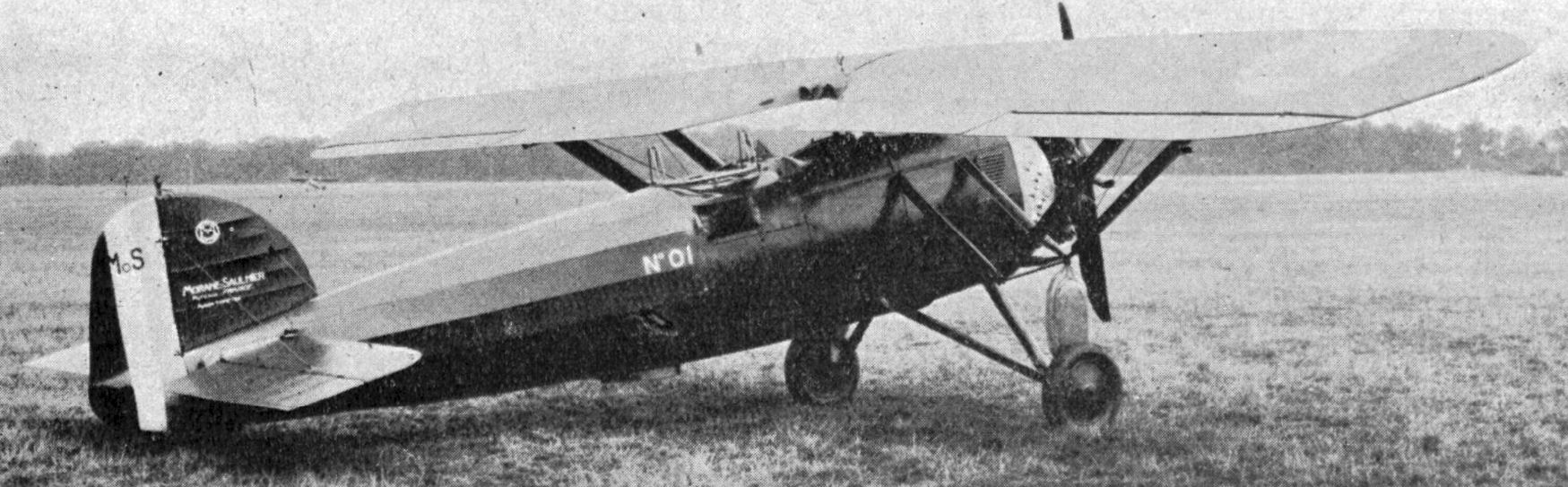

General information
- Type: Liaison. observation and training aircraft
- National origin: France
- Manufacturer: Morane-Saulnier
- Number built: 1

History
- First flight: late 1928-early 1929

The Morane-Saulnier MS.152 was a French multi-purpose aircraft built in 1928. It did not go into production.

== Design and development ==
The MS.152 was designed to meet a government requirement for an aircraft which was powerful enough to carry the equipment required to train the crews of observation and bomber aircraft, and to act as medical and liaison aircraft, but without the high running expenses of the 340–370 kW (450–500 hp) engines of the front-line aircraft of the day. Instead of these, the MS.152 could accept a variety of engines producing about 168 kW (225 hp). Like many Morane-Saulnier aircraft, it had a parasol wing. but some components like the wings and undercarriage were new and designed to be simple.

The parasol wing of the MS.152 was in two parts, which were straight-edged with constant thickness and chord. They were swept at about 7° but mounted without dihedral. These fabric covered panels were of mixed construction, with twin metal spars but wooden ribs, false spars and leading edges. Each was supported just beyond mid-span by pairs of streamlined, duralumin tube struts converging downwards from the spars to a frame mounted on the fuselage. This was formed by a parallel pair of horizontal struts from the lower fuselage and a second, similar pair angled down from the upper fuselage. The wing was held over the fuselage on a cabane consisting of two N-struts from the central wing panel joint to the upper fuselage at its two forward principal frames.

The MS.152's nose-mounted, 170 kW (230 hp), nine-cylinder Salmson 9Ab radial engine appears uncowled in photographs. The engine bearings were designed to accept other radial engines of similar powers. Fuel and oil tanks were in the fuselage, which was built around four duralumin tube longerons, joined by metal frames to the rear of the cockpits and with a polygonal dural tube structure behind. The forward section was metal-skinned, with fabric aft. The pilot's cockpit was under a deep trailing edge cut-out, easing access and providing an upward field of view. He controlled a machine gun fitted to the port side of the fuselage. Behind him was a second cockpit which could be fitted out in different ways, for example with radio or photographic equipment or for gunnery with twin Lewis guns on a flexible mount plus a synchronised Vickers machine gun, or with night-flying equipment.

The empennage of the MS.152 was conventional, with its horizontal tail, almost rectangular in plan and of high aspect ratio, mounted on the upper fuselage. Its fin was quadrantal in profile and carried a tapered rudder down to the keel. The control surfaces were unbalanced.

It had conventional, fixed landing gear with a 3 m (120 in) track. Each mainwheel was on a cranked axle hinged on the lower fuselage, with a drag strut fixed further aft. Its faired, rubber ring-damped landing leg was almost vertical and attached to the forward part of the wing strut mounting frame.

== Operational history ==
The date of the first flight of the MS.152 is not known but a photograph shows it complete by November 1928. It is not mentioned in the French aeronautical press after January 1929, so its development history is unknown. Both Caudron and Hanriot had competed with Morane-Saulnier to supply the liaison and multi-role trainer aircraft and the French Air Force selected the Hanriot H.43.

== Specifications ==
Data from Les Ailes, January 1929

General characteristics

- Length: 8.49 m (27 ft 10 in)
- Wingspan: 12.80 m (42 ft 0 in)
- Height: 3.02 m (9 ft 11 in)
- Wing area: 27.25 m^{2} (293.3 sq ft)
- Empty weight: 959 kg (2,114 lb) equipped
- Gross weight: 1,380 kg (3,042 lb)
- Fuel capacity: 200 L (44 imp gal; 53 US gal)
- Powerplant: 1 × Salmson 9Ab 9-cylinder radial, 170 kW (230 hp)
- Propellers: 2-bladed

Performance

- Maximum speed: 185 km/h (115 mph, 100 kn)
- Service ceiling: 5,000 m (16,000 ft)
