= Morane-Saulnier MS.341 =

Single engine parasol wing training and touring aircraft

MS.341
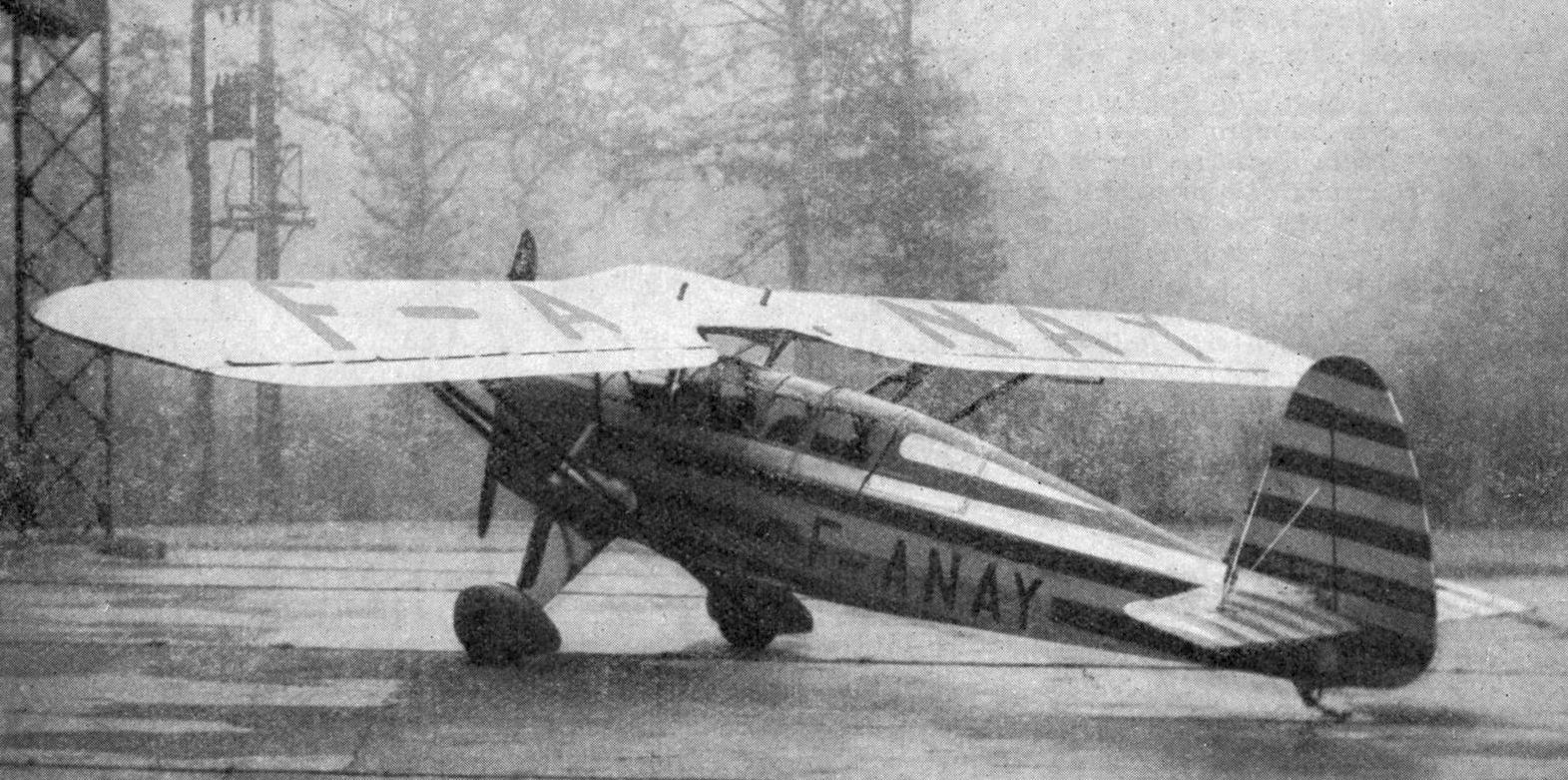

General information
- Type: Light aircraft
- National origin: France
- Manufacturer: Morane-Saulnier
- Number built: c.40 (all variants)

History
- First flight: April 1933

The Morane-Saulnier MS.341 was a single engine parasol wing training and touring aircraft built in France in the mid-1930s. It had two open cockpits in tandem and was sold to private owners, clubs and the Armée de l'Air.

== Design and development ==
The MS.341 was a typical Morane-Saulnier parasol wing monoplane, though it was intended to bring this tradition into line with 1930s practice. Of mixed wood and metal construction, it was designed for club and training rôles. The wing, with 18° of sweep but with no dihedral, was mounted centrally to the upper fuselage by N-shaped cabane struts and braced with V-form lift struts from mid-span to the lower fuselage longeron. The fuselage was flat sided with a curved decking and tandem open cockpits, the forward one under the wing leading edge where there was a cut-out for better visibility. The MS.341 had a fin with a straight leading edge and a tailplane mounted on top of the fuselage, braced to the fin. The rudder extended to the bottom of the fuselage, moving between the two separate elevators. Both control surfaces were horn balanced

The MS.341 had a conventional undercarriage with a small tailwheel. Single mainwheels were mounted on V-form legs hinged centrally under the fuselage. Vertical shock absorber in broad fairings were supported by an array of four struts, one to the forward lift strut's junction with the wing, one to the upper fuselage longeron and two to the lower one. Most of the variants in the MS.340 family were powered by air-cooled inverted four cylinder in-line piston engines from either Renault or de Havilland. The exception was the MS.343 variant which had a nine-cylinder Salmson 9N radial.

The final variant was the MS.345 which appeared in 1935. It had dihedral on the wings and a taller fin and rudder. The shock absorber mounting was simplified, with the four struts per side replaced with a Y-shaped strut between wing and undercarriage leg. The leg struts were now faired together and the wheels spatted. It was powered by a 100 kW (140 hp) Renault 4Pei engine.

The MS.340 prototype made its first flight in April 1933, powered by a 90 kW (120 hp) de Havilland Gipsy III but later flew as a MS.341 with a 90 kW (120 hp) Renault 4Pdi engine. The MS.345 first flew in June 1935 but by this time Morane-Saulnier were concentrating on the MS.405/6 fighter and in the absence of orders for the MS.345 development of the lightplane ceased.

== Operational history ==
The great majority of the MS.340 series aircraft owned by private individuals and clubs were MS.421s, with the French engine. They account for about nineteen of the twenty seven examples of all variants on the reconstructed French Civil register. Five British engined MS.342s appear but four of these were later re-engined to make them MS.341s. Three MS.341s are known to have flown with Republican forces in the Spanish Civil War.

In addition, twelve MS.343s were sold to L'Armée de l'Air.

== Variants ==
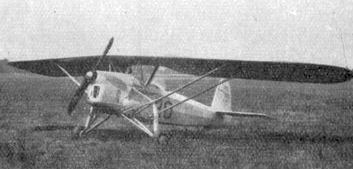
Morane-Saulnier MS 340 photo from L'Aerophile July 1933

Data from Howson

MS.340
Prototype with 89.5 kW (120 hp) de Havilland Gipsy III inverted in-line engine.
MS.341
Prototype re-engined with an 89.5 kW (120 hp) Renault 4Pdi inverted in-line.
MS.341/2
89.5 kW (120 hp) Renault 4Pdi inverted in-line engine.
MS.341/3
104 kW (140 hp) Renault 4Pei inverted in-line engine.
MS.342
97 kW (130 hp) de Havilland Gipsy Major inverted in-line engine.
MS.342/2
MS.342 with enclosed cockpits. One only.
MS.343
130.5 kW (175 hp) Salmson 9Nd radial engine.
MS.343/2
100 kW (135 hp) Salmson 9Nc radial engine.
MS.345
Modifications to wings, undercarriage and empennage. 100 kW (140 hp) Renault 4Pei inverted in-line engine.

== Survivors ==
A MS.341/3 and a MS.342 are in the Amicale Jean-Baptiste Salis collection at Czerny, though neither is on public display; one is being restored.

== Operators ==
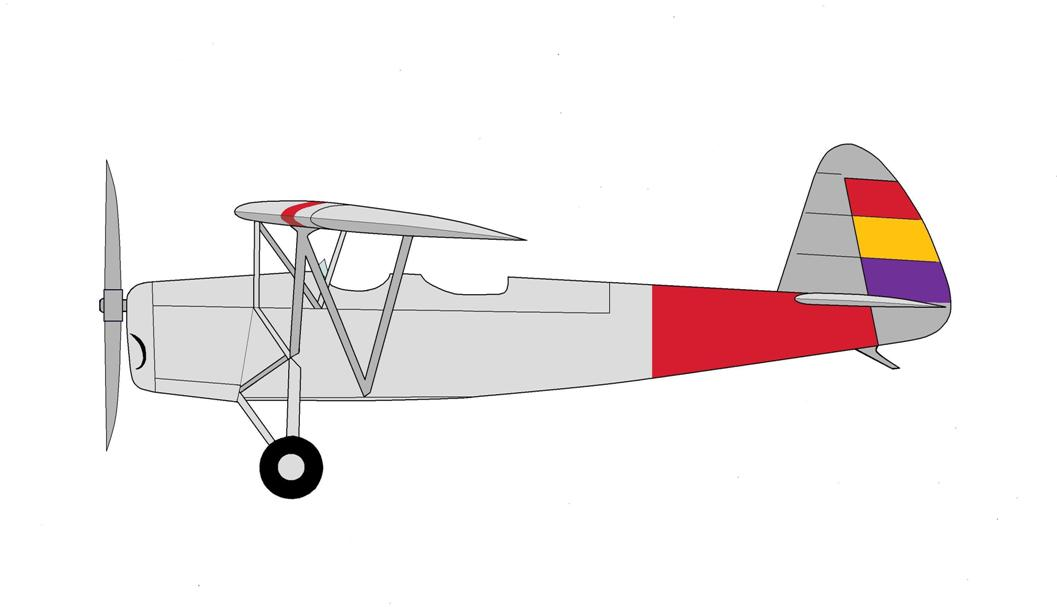
MS 341 of the Spanish Republican Air Force training facility at Santiago de la Ribera. 1937.

France

- French Air Force

Spain

- Spanish Republican Air Force

== Specifications (MS.341/3) ==
Data from Howson

General characteristics

- Crew: 2
- Length: 6.94 m (22 ft 9 in)
- Wingspan: 10.2 m (33 ft 6 in)
- Height: 2.29 m (7 ft 6 in)
- Wing area: 15.75 m^{2} (169.5 sq ft)
- Empty weight: 557 kg (1,228 lb)
- Gross weight: 920 kg (2,028 lb)
- Powerplant: 1 × Renault 4Pei 4-cylinder inverted air-cooled in-line piston, 100 kW (140 hp) at 2,400 rpm
- Propellers: 2-bladed

Performance

- Maximum speed: 200 km/h (120 mph, 110 kn)

== See also ==
Related lists

- List of aircraft of the Spanish Republican Air Force
- List of Interwar military aircraft
