= Morane-Saulnier I =

French WW1 fighter aircraft

Type I
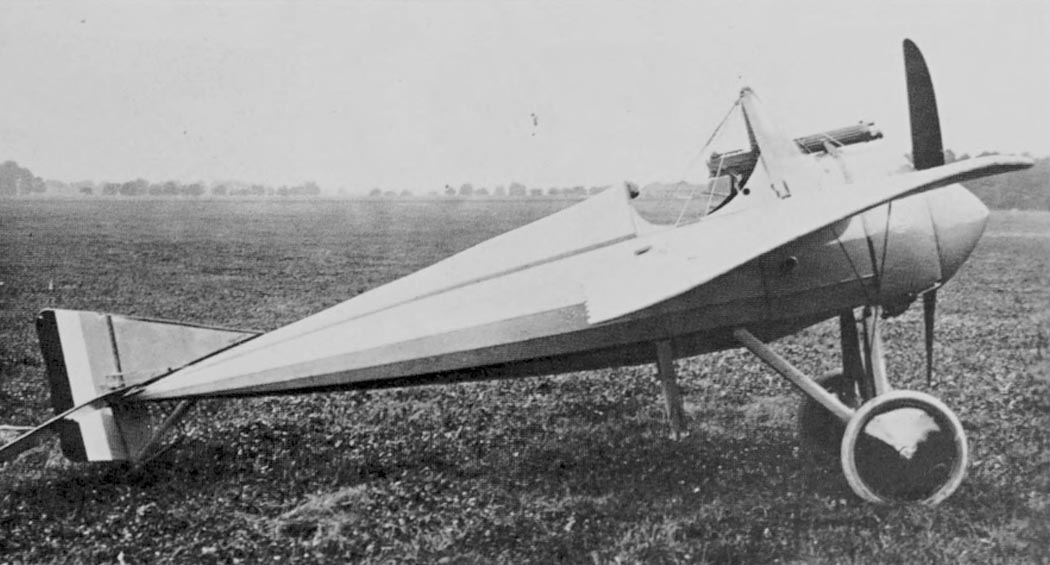

General information
- Type: Fighter
- National origin: France
- Manufacturer: Morane-Saulnier
- Primary user: Royal Flying Corps
- Number built: 4

History
- First flight: March 1916
- Developed from: Morane-Saulnier N

The Morane-Saulnier I, also known as the Morane-Saulnier Type I, was a French fighter of the 1910s. Essentially a modified Morane-Saulnier N, the Royal Flying Corps possessed a number of them in World War I.

== Development ==
Largely on the advice of Lord Trenchard, the Royal Flying Corps placed an order in 1916 for a more powerful version of the popular Morane-Saulnier N. Morane-Saulnier responded by fitting a 110 hp Le Rhône engine to a Type N, creating what they called the Type I. An order was placed initially for one aircraft, expanding to thirteen by March 1916.

== Operational history ==
However, only four aircraft were ever delivered to the RFC by July 1916, the aircraft having first flown in March of that year under RFC trials. No further production took place because the Morane-Saulnier V afforded more favourable characteristics. However, these Type Is were delivered to the front as combat aircraft and used as late as October 1916.

== Variants ==
Morane-Saulnier I
company designation
MS.6
official French government STAe designation for the I

== Operators ==
United Kingdom

- Royal Flying Corps

== Specifications ==
Data from The Aeroplanes of the Royal Flying Corps (Military Wing)

General characteristics

- Crew: 1
- Length: 5.82 m (19 ft 1 in)
- Wingspan: 8.24 m (27 ft 0 in)
- Height: 2.50 m (8 ft 2 in)
- Wing area: 11.00 m^{2} (118.4 sq ft)
- Empty weight: 334 kg (736 lb)
- Gross weight: 510 kg (1,124 lb)
- Powerplant: 1 × Le Rhône 9J nine-cylinder rotary engine , 82 kW (110 hp)

Performance

- Maximum speed: 168 km/h (104 mph, 90 kn)
- Endurance: 1 hour 20 minutes
- Service ceiling: 4,700 m (15,420 ft)

Armament

- 1 x 0.303 in (7.7mm) Vickers machine gun
