= Morane-Saulnier MS.43 =

French trainer aircraft

General information
- Type: Biplane trainer
- National origin: France
- Manufacturer: Morane-Saulnier
- Primary user: French Air Force
- Number built: 79

History
- First flight: 1924
- Retired: 1929
- Developed from: Morane-Saulnier MS.42

The Morane-Saulnier MS.43 was a French two-seat training biplane designed and built by Morane-Saulnier for a 1924 French War Ministry requirement for an intermediate training biplane.

The MS.43 was developed from the prototype MS.42; the equal-span wings of the MS.42 were replaced with the upper wing having a greater span than the lower. The structure was also strengthened for its training role, it being expected that trainee pilots would land it hard on airfields with rough surfaces. The aircraft had tandem cockpits with dual controls and was powered by a 180 hp (134 kW) Hispano-Suiza V-8 engine. The aircraft entered service with the French Air Force and 79 were built. In 1929 the aircraft were withdrawn from service and sold on the civilian market.

== Specifications ==
Data from General Les Ailes, June 1923 Performance AviaFrance

General characteristics

- Crew: Two
- Length: 7.865 m (25 ft 10 in)
- Upper wingspan: 10.80 m (35 ft 5 in)
- Lower wingspan: 8.44 m (27 ft 8 in)
- Height: 3.10 m (10 ft 2 in)
- Wing area: 28.5 m^{2} (307 sq ft)
- Empty weight: 800 kg (1,764 lb)
- Gross weight: 1,120 kg (2,469 lb)
- Powerplant: 1 × Hispano-Suiza 8Ab air-cooled V 8, 130 kW (180 hp)
- Propellers: 2-bladed, 2.50 m (8 ft 2 in) diameter

Performance

- Maximum speed: 164 km/h (102 mph, 89 kn) at sea level
- Service ceiling: 5,500 m (18,000 ft)
- Time to altitude: 1,000 m (3,300 ft)
