= Morane-Saulnier MS.180 =

Single engine parasol wing aerobatic trainer aircraft

MS.180
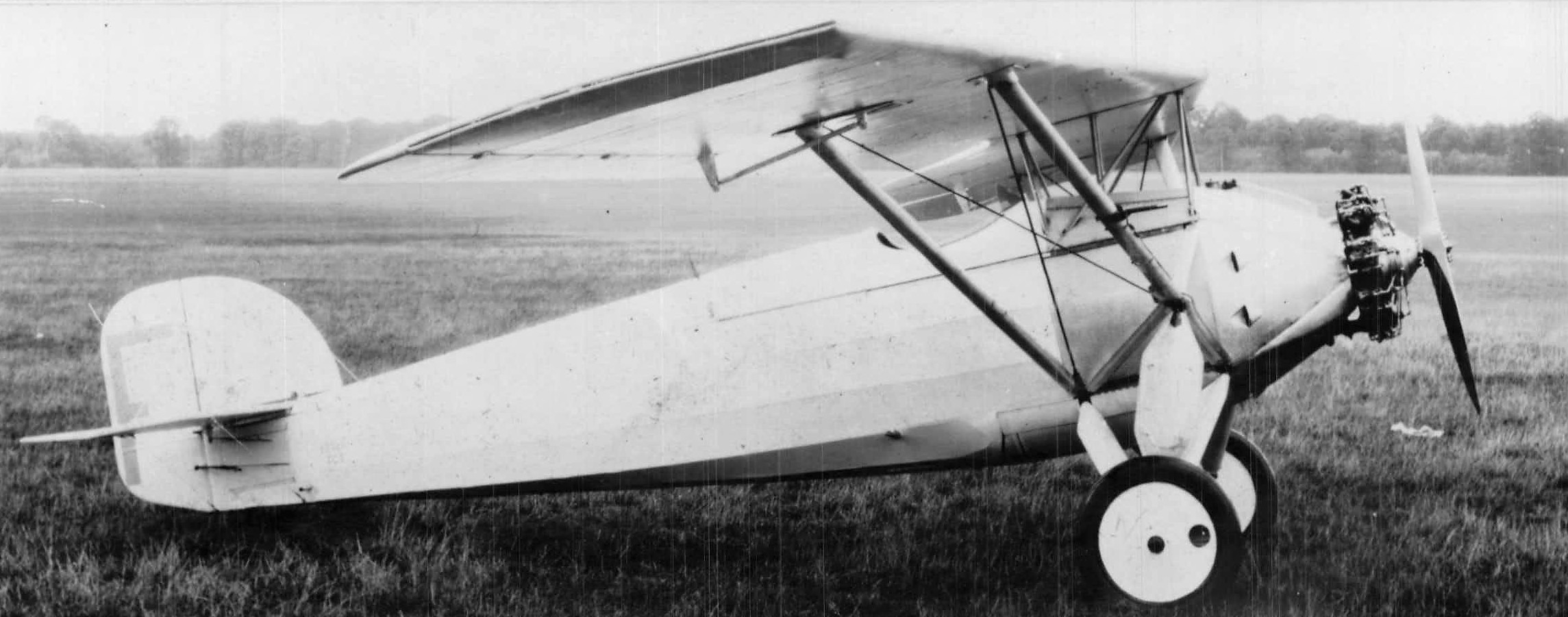

General information
- Type: Aerobatic aircraft
- National origin: France
- Manufacturer: Morane-Saulnier
- Number built: c.17

History
- First flight: 1929

The Morane-Saulnier MS.180 is a single engine parasol wing aerobatic trainer aircraft that was designed and produced by the French aircraft manufacturer Morane-Saulnier.

Designed during the late 1920s, the MS.180 built on the company's legacy of competent light aircraft. Specifically designed to performing aerobatics and the trainer role, it bore more than a passing resemblance to the Morane-Saulnier MS.230, save for its single-seat cockpit and its slightly smaller size. The aircraft was intended for military air services as well as by private pilots; as such, it not only possessed a relatively high safety margin but also favourable flight characteristics for carrying out a broad range of aerobatic manoeuvres.

The prototype performed its maiden flight in 1929 and performed remarkably well during flight testing. About seventeen production standard MS.181 were produced; these were mainly used in French flying clubs. Multiple aircraft were operated by Spanish Republican forces to train combat pilots during the Spanish Civil War; two MS.181s were supposedly still airworthy by the end of the conflict. Several aircraft survived the Second World War and continued to be flown in France; at least one remained in regular use by Compagnie Française d'Aviation through to the 1970s.

== Development ==
By the late 1920s, Morane-Saulnier had established a good reputation for their light aircraft, which included a series of parasol wing fighter aircraft. What would become the MS.180 was built in that tradition, however, it was specifically designed to function as an aerobatics trainer, a single seat near contemporary of the twin seat but otherwise similar Morane-Saulnier MS.230; other differences included it being somewhat smaller and much lower powered. Furthermore, the MS.180 was designed to achieve a safety factor of 15. It was anticipated that the type would be adopted by various training centres and military air services as well as by private pilots.

During 1929, the MS.180 conducted its maiden flight, powered by a Salmson 9Ad radial engine. The flight test programme went remarkably well throughout. Final refinements were performed by Michael Detroyat at Velizy-Villacoublay. Later aircraft, designated MS.181, were powered by the larger capacity (5.1 L, 315 cu in) 60 hp (40 kW) Salmson 5Ac five-cylinder radial. Reconstructions of the French civil aircraft register suggest that only a single MS.180 was ever built and that it was subsequently outfitted with the more powerful engine.

== Design ==
The Morane-Saulnier MS.180 was a single engine aerobatic trainer aircraft. Having been specifically designed to perform pilot training, various features of the aircraft facilitated this use in this capacity, including a relatively high safety factor and the autostabilising doubly-curved profile of its parasol wing, which was broadly similar to that already in use upon Morane-Saulnier's earlier training aircraft. It was suitable for the training of military pilots, its flight envelope and flying characteristics were well suited to performing all customary aerobatic manoeuvres, including all manner of looping, spinning, and rolling.

The aircraft comprised mixed construction, elements being made of either wood or metal. The structure of the fuselage consisted of four longerons, which were either spruce or ash, that were joined at the front via a pair of metal frames. Other than these frames, a conventionally-arranged girder was present, along with spruce uprights, cross beams and piano-wire bracing. This framework supported a light wooden cowling that was covered with fabric throughout the whole length of the fuselage, except for the forward end which was instead provisioned with removable metal hoods. The fuselage was connected to the parasol wing via a series of inverted V-shaped metal cabane struts.

The wing was divided into two symmetrical sections; each half-wing was rigidly braced to the lower fuselage using parallel pairs of lift struts composed of duralumin tubing; these tubes were covered with streamlined fairings and were sufficient for their purpose that no use of cross wires was made. The wing lacked any lateral dihedral but was swept back at an angle of 15 degrees. The ailerons were unbalanced and ran parallel to the wing's trailing edge. The wing structure comprised both metal elements, such as the spars and ailerons, and wooden portions, such as the ribs. The exterior of the wing was covered with fabric that was both doped and painted. The cockpit was located beneath the wing's trailing edge. It was relatively easy to access and was also designed with the use of a parachute in mind, sufficient space for which was intentionally provided.

The tail unit had a light metal framework and a fabric covering; a total of eight streamlined high-resistance steel wires were used to secure the tail. The tailplane was positioned on top of the fuselage; the fin had a rounded leading edge while the rudder extended to the bottom of the fuselage, moving between separate elevators. Neither the rudder or elevator were balanced, being mounted on ball bearings in a similar manner to the ailerons. The horizontal stabiliser was adjustable on the ground..

The MS.180 was furnished with a large fixed conventional undercarriage that comprised single mainwheels mounted in an axleless arrangement on V-shaped struts that were hinged to the lower fuselage. It had a relatively wide track that made it suitable for landing on a rough field or amid crosswinds. Its controllability on the ground was bolstered by its use of a movable tail skid, the direction of which was set by the pilot. The legs, which were equipped with rubber-based shock absorbers, were near vertical and directly attached to the forward lift struts; these struts were further braced to the upper fuselage at the leg attachment points.

The aircraft was powered by a single Salmson 9Ad nine cylinder radial engine that could output up to 40 hp (30 kW). It directly drove a twin-bladed wooden propeller and was mounted on a removable frame that was attached to the nose of the aircraft, lacking any cowling. The fuel tank, which held sufficient fuel to permit up to three hours of flight at full power, was positioned in the bottom of the fuselage. In an emergency situation, the entire fuel tank could be jettisoned.

== Operational history ==
In total, about 17 examples of the MS.180 and its variants were produced, mostly MS.181s. Fifteen MS.181s were owned by Compagnie Française d'Aviation and used in its flying schools from 1930. One was still flying with them in the 1970s. Four of them were acquired by the Republican air force in 1937 for pilot training early in the Spanish Civil War.

== Variants ==
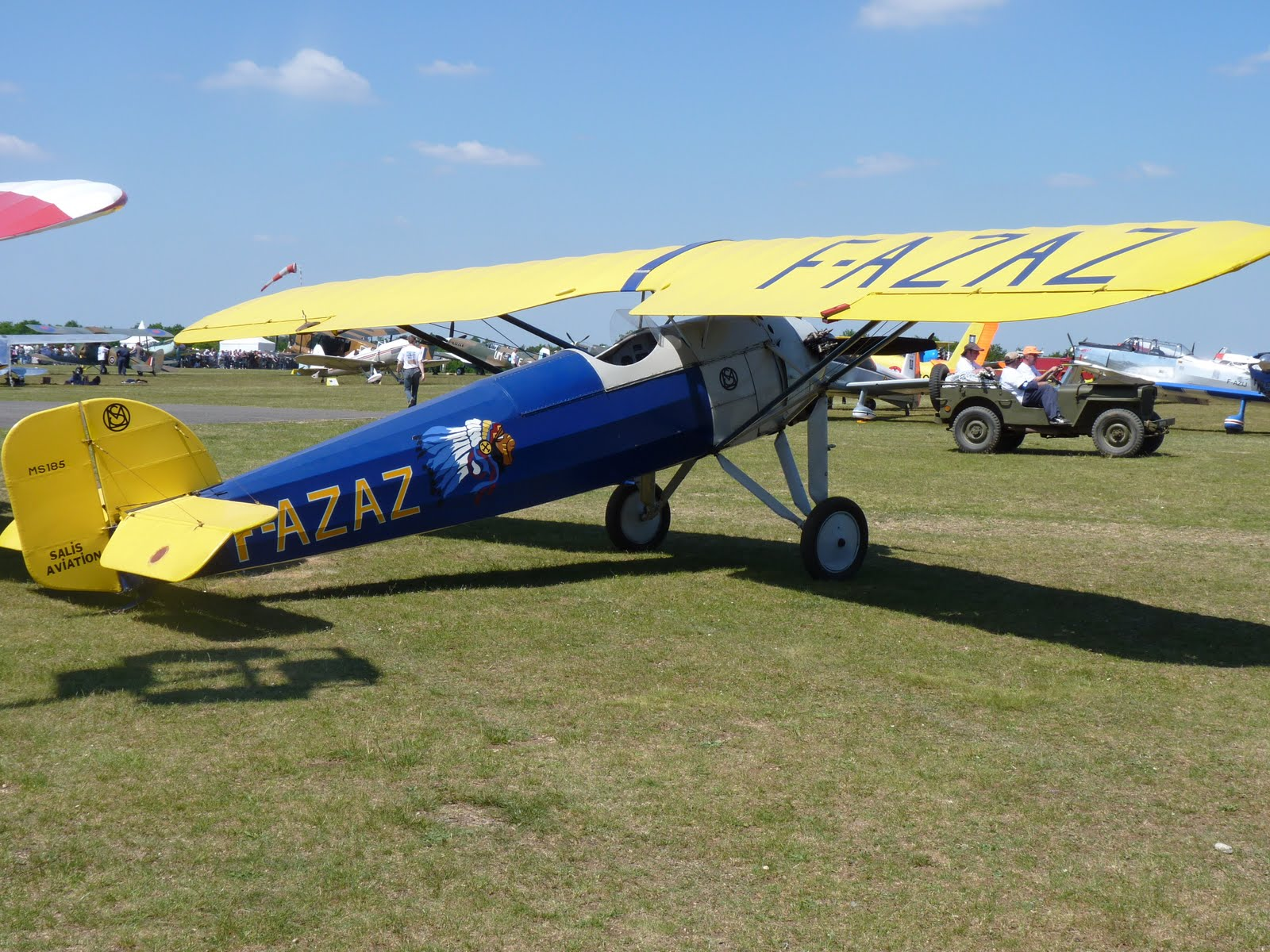
Morane-Saulnier MS.185.

MS.180

- Prototype with 40 hp (30 kW) Salmson 9Ad nine-cylinder radial engine. One built, converted to MS.181.

MS.181

- Production version with 60 hp (40 kW) Salmson 5Ac five-cylinder radial engine. About 15 built.

MS.185

- One built.

== Surviving aircraft ==
Two MS.180-series aircraft are still flying in France. MS.181 N304JX/F-AJXN, previously at EAA AirVenture Oshkosh is privately owned. The MS.185 F-AZAZ is in the Amicale Jean-Baptiste Salis collection at Cerny and is also on display.

The Salis collection has another, non-flying MS.181, though it is not on general display. The Museo del Aire at Cuatro Vientos near Madrid displays a non-flying MS.181 marked up in Spanish Republican Air Force colours.

== Operators ==
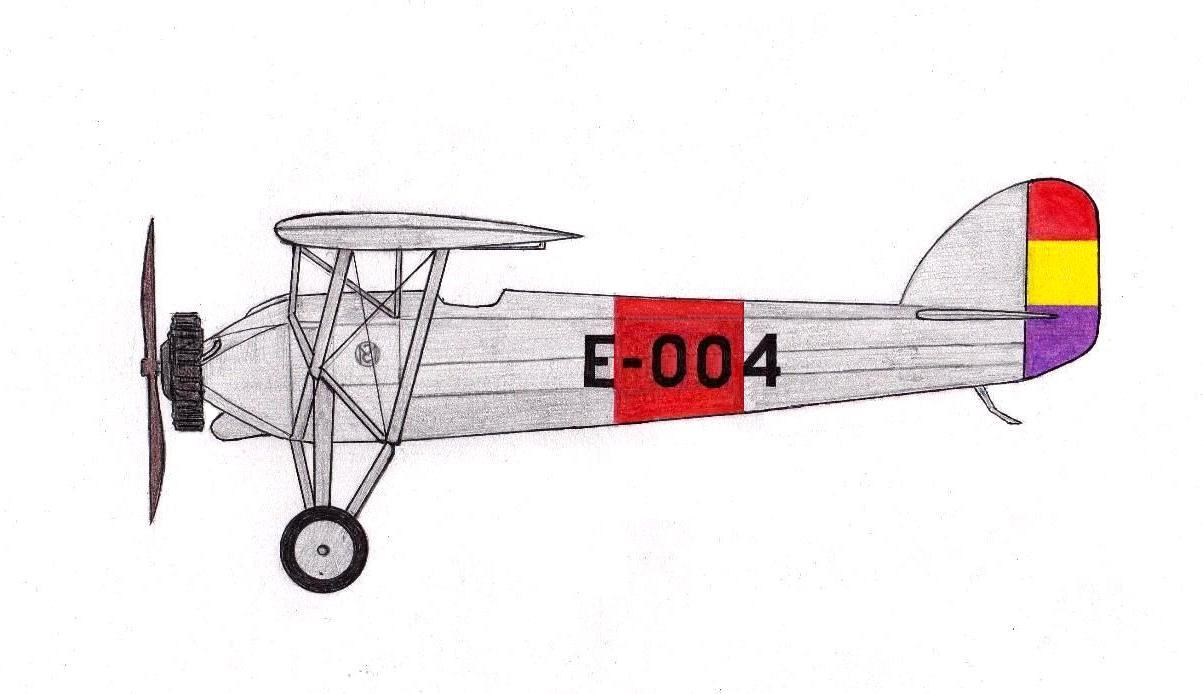
Morane-Saulnier MS.181 of the Spanish Republican Air Force

Spain

- Spanish Republican Air Force

== Specifications (MS.180) ==
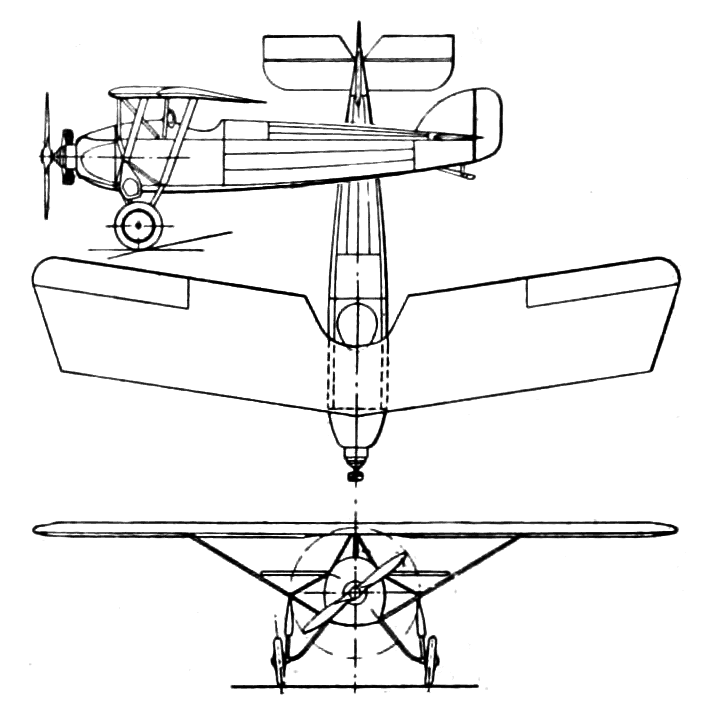
Morane Saulnier MS.180 3-view drawing from Aero Digest December 1929

Data from Aircraft of the Spanish Civil War, National Advisory Committee for Aeronautics

General characteristics

- Crew: 1
- Length: 6.04 m (19 ft 10 in)
- Wingspan: 9.0 m (29 ft 6 in)
- Height: 2.29 m (7 ft 6 in)
- Wing area: 13.2 m^{2} (142 sq ft)
- Empty weight: 379 kg (836 lb)
- Gross weight: 510 kg (1,124 lb)
- Powerplant: 1 × Salmson 9Ad nine-cylinder air-cooled radial engine, 3.65 L swept volume., 30 kW (40 hp)

Performance

- Maximum speed: 133 km/h (83 mph, 72 kn) at sea level. It is not certain if these performance figures relate to the MS.180 or the MS.181.
- Time to altitude: 1,000 m (3,280ft) in 11 minutes and 15 seconds

== See also ==
Related lists

- List of Interwar military aircraft
- List of aircraft of the Spanish Republican Air Force
