= Morane-Saulnier =

French aircraft manufacturer (1911–1966)

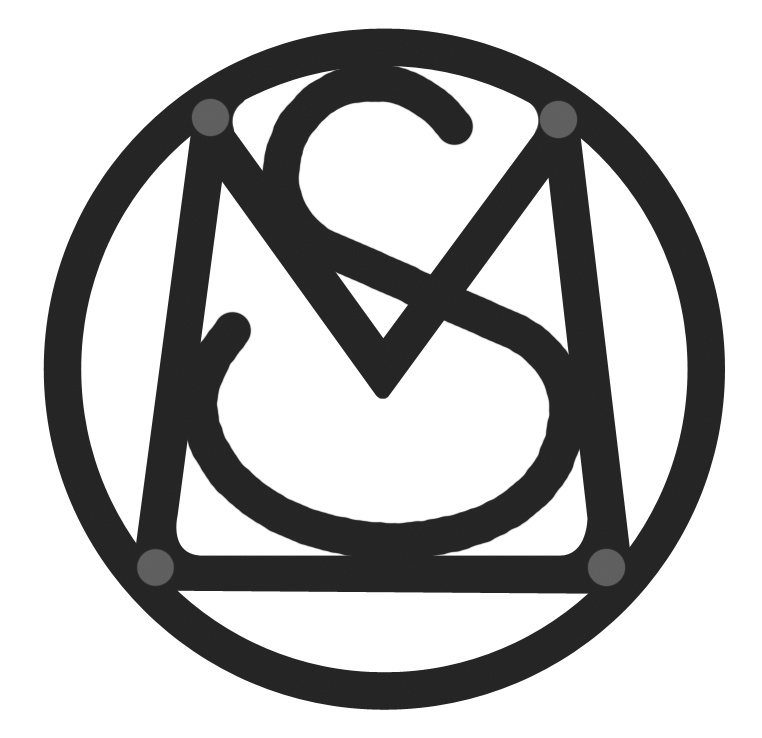
- Industry: Aerospace
- Founded: 1911; 114 years ago
- Founders: Raymond Saulnier and Robert and Léon Morane
- Fate: bought out by Potez on 7 January 1962
- Successor: Société d'exploitation des Établissements Morane-Saulnier (SEEMS) and SOCATA
- Headquarters: France
- Products: Aircraft

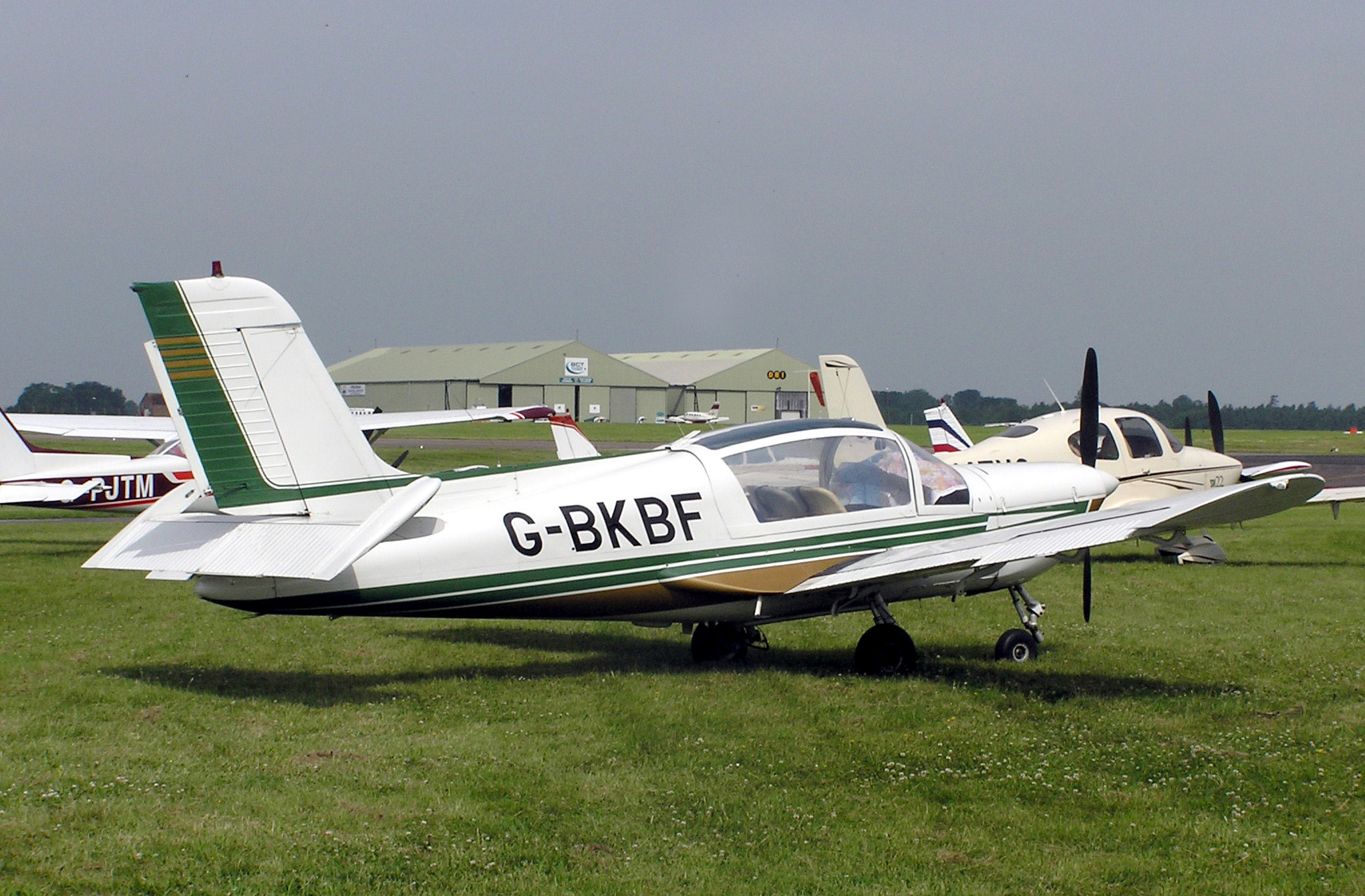
1970 Morane-Saulnier Rallye Minerva MS.894A

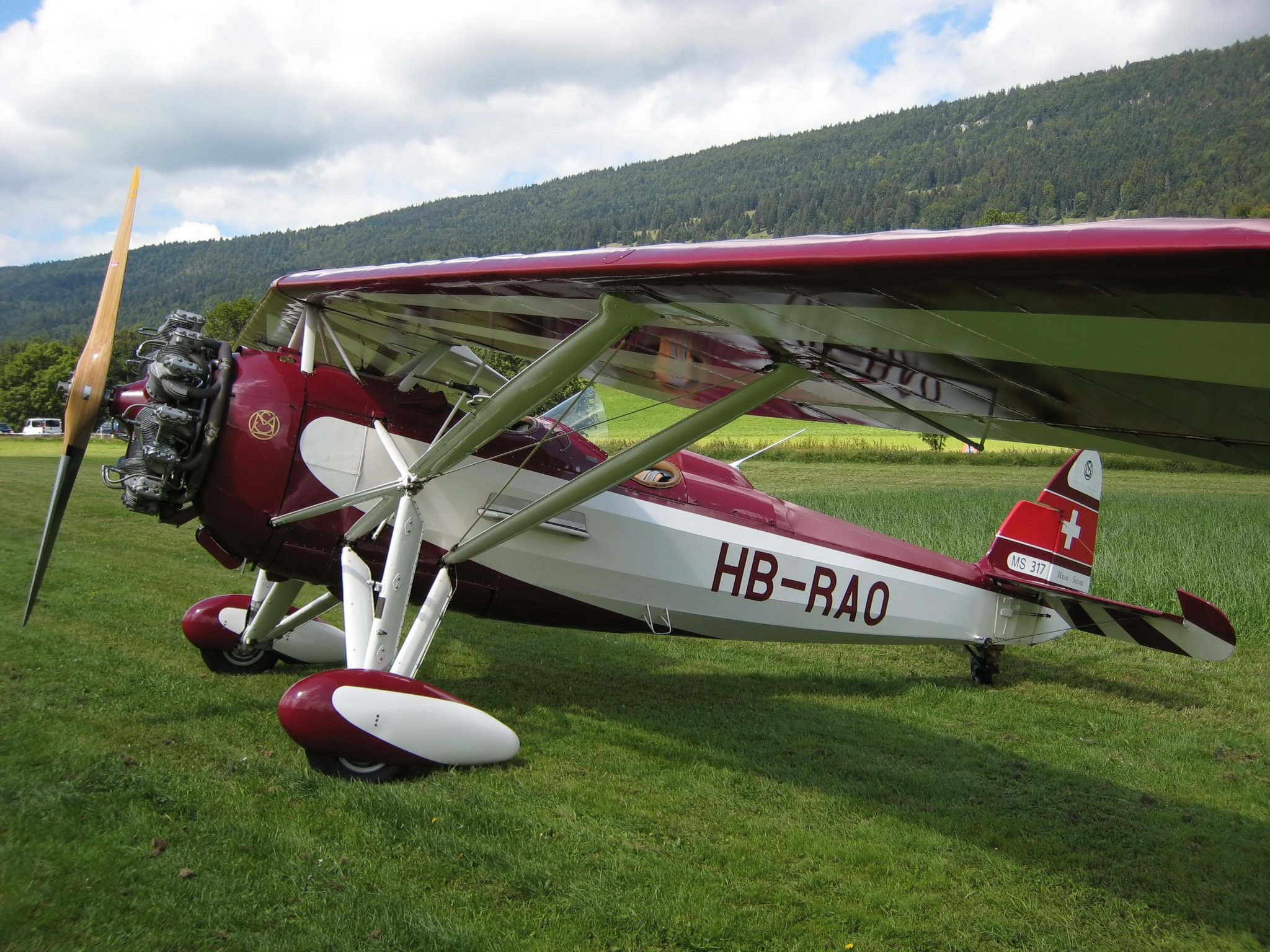
Morane-Saulnier MS.317

Aéroplanes Morane-Saulnier was a French aircraft manufacturing company formed in October 1911 by Raymond Saulnier and the Morane brothers, Léon and Robert. The company was taken over and diversified in the 1960s.

== History ==
=== Model development ===
Morane-Saulnier's first product was the Morane-Borel monoplane, a development of a monoplane design produced by the Morane company (sometimes called Type A) in partnership with Gabriel Borel). Using a wing-warping mechanism for control, this was the type in which Jules Védrines won the Paris-Madrid race on 26 May 1911.

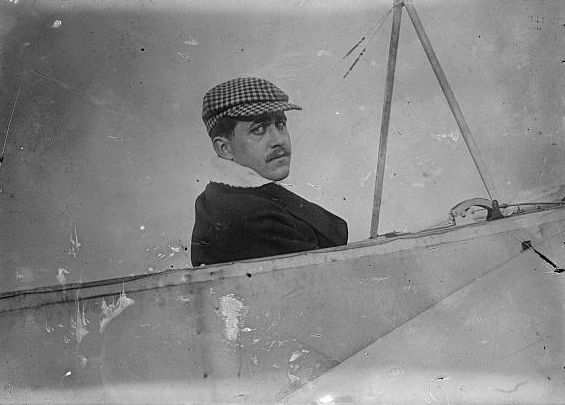
Léon Morane

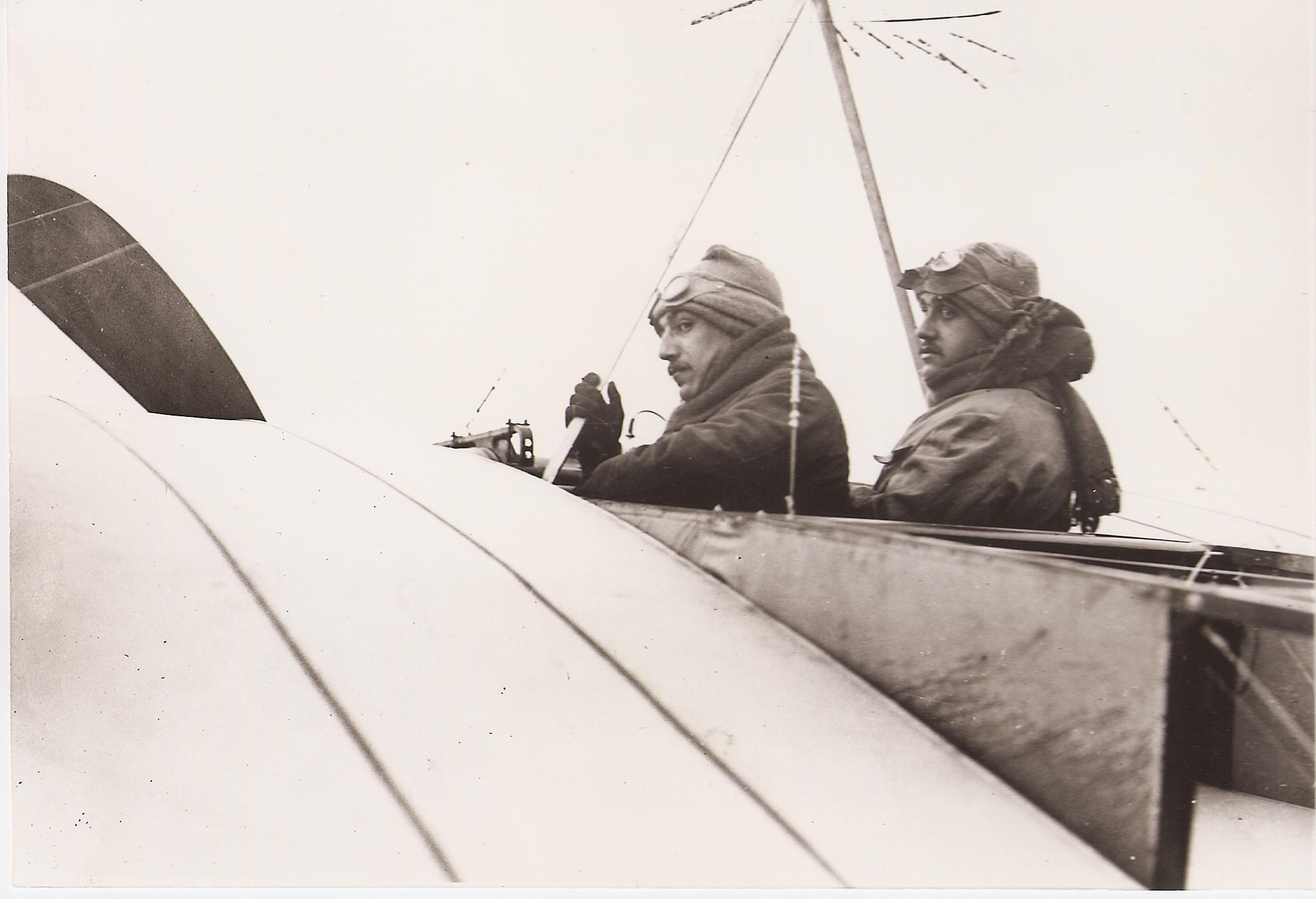
1910:Robert and Léon Morane before takeoff in two-seat Bleriot XI. Both were nearly killed when the machine crashed shortly after. The brothers decided to start their own company afterward.

Morane-Saulnier's first commercially successful design was the Morane-Saulnier G, a wire-braced shoulder-wing monoplane with wing warping. This led to the development of a series of aircraft and was very successful in racing and setting records. The Type G was a 2-seater, and was reduced slightly in size to produce the Morane-Saulnier H, a single-seater, and was given a faired fuselage to produce the Morane-Saulnier N single-seat fighter. The Morane-Saulnier H was modified so that its wings were mounted parasol fashion, above the fuselage to afford the observer a better view, creating the Morane-Saulnier L. The L was then fitted with a faired fuselage as on the N and ailerons to make the Morane-Saulnier LA, which was then completely redesigned (though looking very similar) to make the Morane-Saulnier P which would be the basis for a whole family of aircraft developed in the 1920s. The Type N was developed into the larger and more powerful Morane-Saulnier I and the very similar Morane-Saulnier V, but these were not successful, being too powerful and having inadequate controls. The V was then redesigned to create the Morane-Saulnier AC which substituted ailerons for wing warping and had a strut-braced wing. The AC was not particularly successful, in part because of poor field of view a shoulder-mounted wing produced, so the Morane-Saulnier AI was developed, in which the wing was raised above the fuselage. The AI lost out in the competition to the SPAD XIII but was built in limited numbers in case there was a problem with the SPAD; as it turned out it was the AI that suffered structural problems.

In parallel to the L the Morane-Saulnier BB was developed for the RFC, which was a Type P built as a biplane. Because the type 'BB' when pronounced in French sounds like Bebe (or baby), this became the type's nickname. Most of these types had no fixed fin, or horizontal stabilizer, with the result that they were not only very sensitive on the controls, but also could not even be flown hands off. One early pilot noted that if one left the aircraft to its own devices it would end up going upside down in the opposite direction. Despite this, many were used as trainers, including a great many that had their wings stripped so they couldn't fly, creating what was known as a Penguin.

The Type L has the distinction of being the first fighter aircraft used during World War I when one was fitted with a machine gun firing through the propeller, which was fitted with metal plates to deflect any bullets that struck it. This was flown with success by Roland Garros, who would later be considered to be the first French Ace. A similar system was fitted to the Type N pending the arrival of other machine guns, which made the system workable. While flying his modified Type L, Garros crashed on the German side of the lines and the wreckage was examined by Fokker just prior to Fokker producing a similar system.

After the war, Morane-Saulnier produced a number of designs for training and general aviation, but with the threat of war in the late thirties it once again turned to military aircraft. During the late 1920s and early 1930s, it produced a number of parasol wing fighters including the M.S.230 and M.S.315, but all were of limited performance and were relegated to training duties. Morane-Saulnier had much more success with its dramatically modernized M.S.406, which was the French Air Force's most numerous fighter at the start of the war. The 406 was advanced only at the time of its introduction in 1935, and suffered terribly against the more modern Messerschmitt Bf 109s it faced in 1940.

During World War II, Morane-Saulnier was operated under German control and built a number of German types including the Fieseler Storch, known after the war as the Morane-Saulnier MS.500 Criquet. Morane-Saulnier also produced a number of trainer and civilian aircraft models, the best known of which was the successful "Rallye" series of four-seat STOL semi-aerobatic tourers (see picture above).

Morane-Saulnier was purchased by Potez on 7 January 1962, and became SEEMS, the Societe d'Exploitation des Etablissements Morane-Saulnier. In 1966 its civilian models were spun off to form SOCATA, the Societe de Construction d'Avions de Tourisme et d'Affaires, which was eventually purchased by Aérospatiale.

=== Development of gun synchronisation ===
The company and Saulnier himself had a significant role in the development of the concept of synchronising machine gun fire through an aircraft's propeller.

== Morane-Saulnier designs ==
- Morane-Borel monoplane (Also retrospectively "Type A")
- Morane-Saulnier B
- Morane-Saulnier G
- Morane-Saulnier H
- Morane-Saulnier L
- Morane-Saulnier LA
- Morane-Saulnier N
- Morane-Saulnier I - Type N with more powerful engine
- Morane-Saulnier V
- Morane-Saulnier P
- Morane-Saulnier T
- Morane-Saulnier AC
- Morane-Saulnier AF
- Morane-Saulnier AI (variants MoS-27, MoS-28 MoS-29, MoS-30)
- Morane-Saulnier AN
- Morane-Saulnier AR
- Morane-Saulnier BB
- Morane-Saulnier MS.43
- Morane-Saulnier MoS-50
- Morane-Saulnier MoS.53
- Morane-Saulnier MoS-121
- Morane-Saulnier MS.129
- Morane-Saulnier MS.130
- Morane-Saulnier MS.130 Michelin Cup
- Morane-Saulnier MS.132
- Morane-Saulnier MS.138
- Morane-Saulnier MS.139
- Morane-Saulnier MS.140
- Morane-Saulnier MS.147
- Morane-Saulnier MS.148
- Morane-Saulnier MS.149
- Morane-Saulnier MS.152
- Morane-Saulnier MS.180
- Morane-Saulnier MS.181
- Morane-Saulnier MS.185
- Morane-Saulnier MS.200
- Morane-Saulnier MS.221/MS.222/MS.223
- Morane-Saulnier MS.224
- Morane-Saulnier M.S.225/M.S.226/MS.227
- Morane-Saulnier MS.230
- Morane-Saulnier MS.231
- Morane-Saulnier MS.232
- Morane-Saulnier MS.233
- Morane-Saulnier MS.234
- MS.235, MS.236, MS.237 - MS.230 variants with different engines
- Morane-Saulnier MS.275
- Morane-Saulnier MS.315
- Morane-Saulnier M.S.325
- Morane-Saulnier MS.340
- Morane-Saulnier MS.341
- Morane-Saulnier MS.342
- Morane-Saulnier MS.343
- Morane-Saulnier MS.345
- Morane-Saulnier MS.350
- Morane-Saulnier MS.405
- Morane-Saulnier M.S.406, MS.410, MS.411, MS.412, MS.430, MS.435, MS.450
- Morane-Saulnier MS.470 Vanneau
- Morane-Saulnier MS.500 Criquet, MS.502, MS.505 - production of Fieseler Fi 156 Storch under German occupation and post liberation
- Morane-Saulnier MS.560
- Morane-Saulnier MS.570
- Morane-Saulnier MS.571
- Morane Saulnier MS.603
- Morane-Saulnier MS.660
- Morane-Saulnier MS-700 Pétrel
- Morane-Saulnier MS.703
- Morane-Saulnier Alcyon (MS.730 MS.731, MS.732, MS.733, MS.7350)
- Morane-Saulnier MS.755 Fleuret
- Morane-Saulnier MS.760 Paris
- Morane-Saulnier MS.880 Rallye
- Morane-Saulnier MS.880b Rallye
- Morane-Saulnier MS.885 Super Rallye
- Morane-Saulnier MS.893E
- Morane-Saulnier MS.1500

== Gallery ==
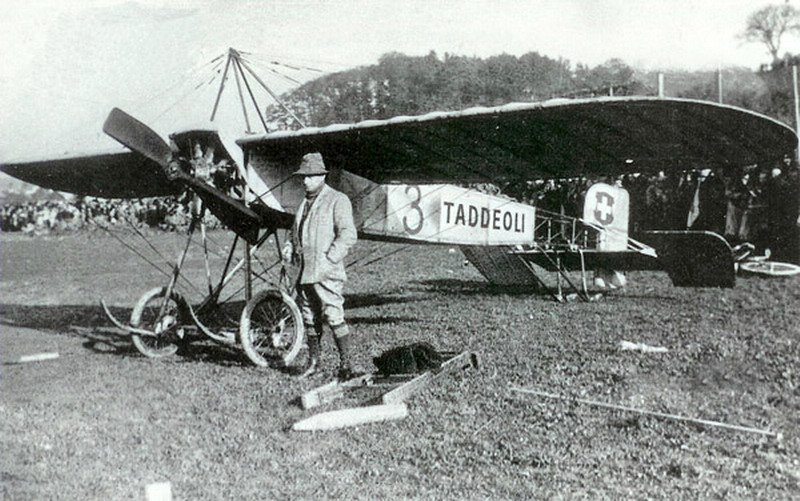
Morane-Saulnier Type A

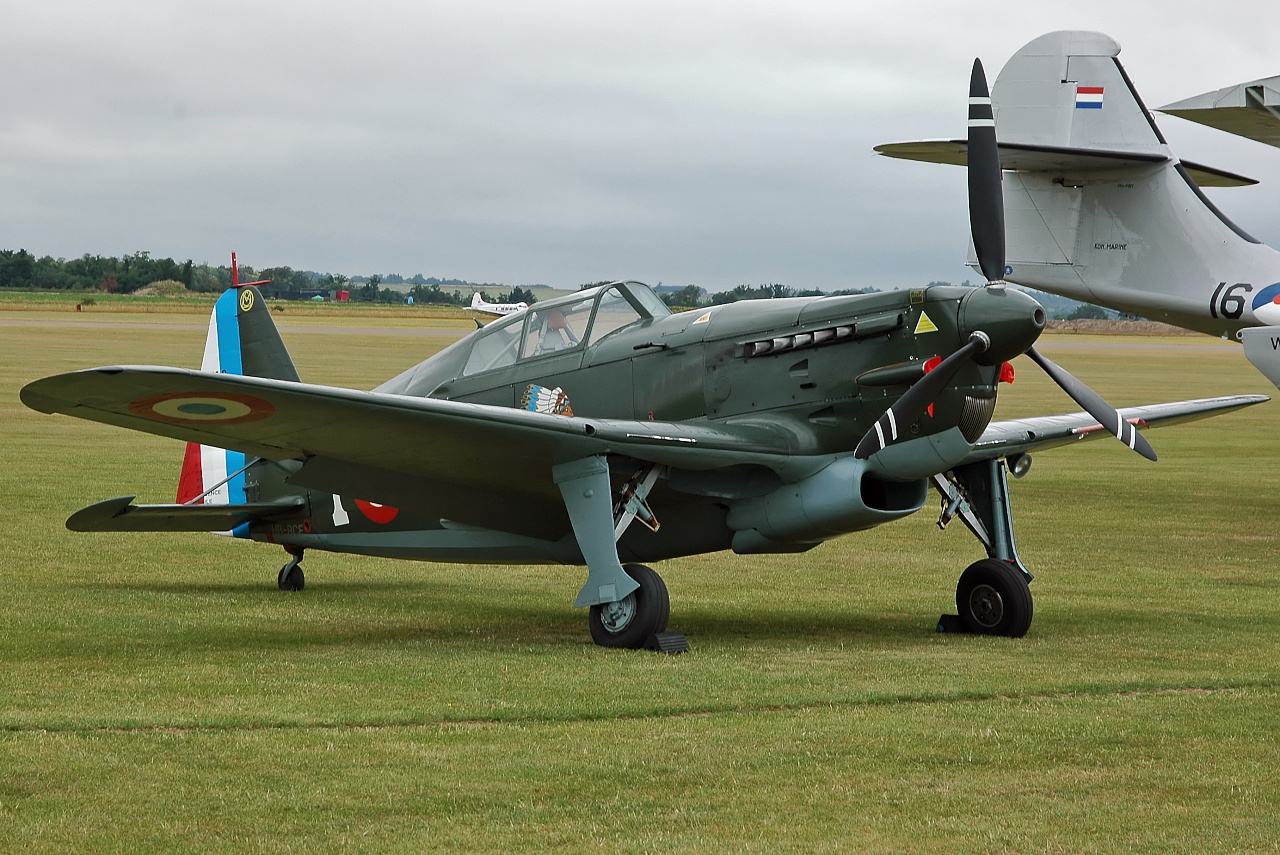
Morane-Saulnier 406

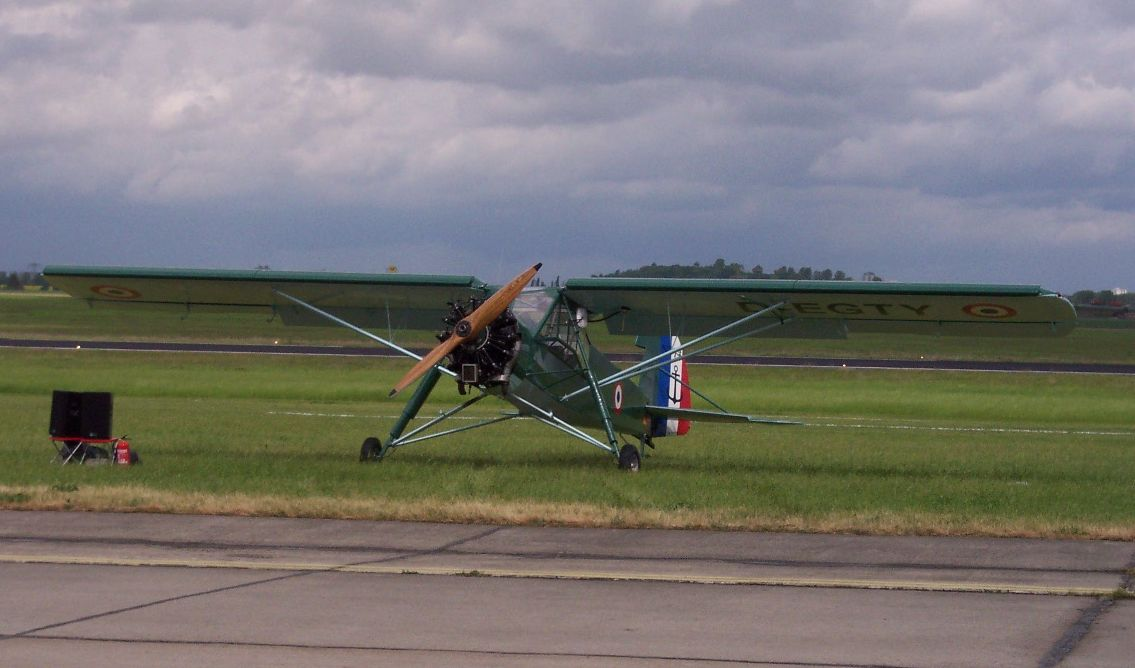
Morane-Saulnier MS.505 Criquet, a French built Fieseler Fi 156 Storch

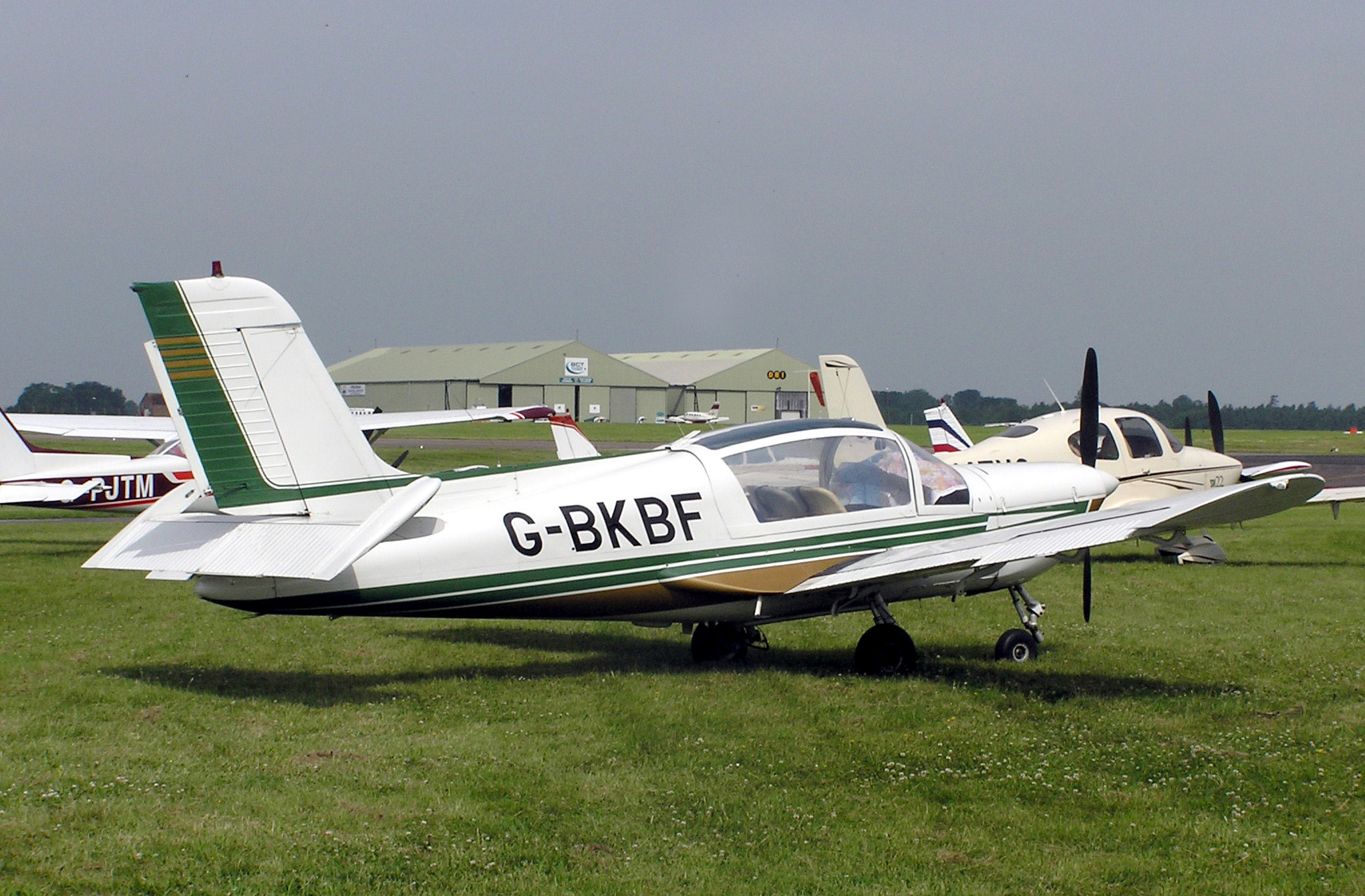
Morane-Saulnier Socata Rallye Minerva MS.894A
