= Morane-Saulnier MS.660 =

General information
- Type: Single seat light aircraft
- National origin: France
- Manufacturer: Morane-Saulnier
- Number built: 3

History
- First flight: 17 February 1946

The Morane-Saulnier MS.660 was a prototype French single seat light aircraft intended to be sold as a kit for assembly at home. A single prototype flew in 1946, and was followed by two modified examples, the MS.661 and MS.662, but the type was not successful with no production following.

== Design and development ==
Following the end of the Second World War, the French aircraft manufacturer Morane-Saulnier, planning to exploit an expected boom in private aviation in France, designed a simple single-seat light aircraft, intended to be built at home from a kit of prefabricated parts. Where practicable, sections were to be able to be assembled on a 2 × 1 m living room table.

The resulting aircraft, the Morane-Saulnier MS.660, was a high-wing monoplane with a fixed tricycle landing gear. The fuselage was of rectangular section, and was constructed of thick plywood panels glued and nailed to plywood bulkheads and frames. It was made in three sections to ease assembly - the nose section included the cockpit, engine mount and attachments for the wings. The fin was integral to the rear section. The rectangular wings were braced with struts, and had duralumin spars and wooden ribs, with plywood covering and could be folded rearwards to ease storage. The cockpit was partially enclosed, with cutouts in the plywood fuselage sides allowing access. The aircraft was powered by a single Train 4E-01 air-cooled 4-cylinder inverted inline engine, rated at 50 horsepower (37 kW), which drove a two-bladed propeller.

The prototype MS.660, aircraft registration F-WBCA made its first flight at Morane-Saulnier's Puteaux works on 14 February 1946. The MS.660 was given a provisional airworthiness certificate and took part in an official presentation of light aircraft at Toussus-le-Noble Airport on 22 April 1946, but it attracted little attention, as the compromises that allowed for easy construction and low cost limited the aircraft's performance.

Later that year, an example of the MS.661, with a new oval-section fuselage was produced, while in 1947, the MS.662, powered by a 60 hp (45 kW) Aster engine was flown, but neither resulted in production, with more modern and capable aircraft available at lower price.

== Variants ==
MS.660
Single-seat ultralight aircraft, registration F-WBGA, powered by 50 hp (37 kW) Train 4E engine.
MS.661
Revised oval-section fuselage. 1 (F-WCDY) built.
MS.662
Powered by 60 hp (45 kW) Aster engine. One (F-BCDY) built.

== Specifications (MS.660) ==
Data from Jane's All the World's Aircraft 1947

General characteristics

- Crew: 1
- Length: 5.60 m (18 ft 4 in)
- Wingspan: 7.20 m (23 ft 7 in)
- Width: 2.10 m (6 ft 11 in) (folded)
- Height: 2.20 m (7 ft 3 in)
- Wing area: 9.0 m^{2} (97 sq ft)
- Empty weight: 232 kg (511 lb)
- Gross weight: 360 kg (794 lb)
- Fuel capacity: 38 L (8.4 imp gal; 10 US gal)
- Powerplant: 1 × Train 4E-01 air-cooled, 4-cylinder inline piston engine, 37 kW (50 hp)

Performance

- Maximum speed: 160 km/h (99 mph, 86 kn) at sea level
- Cruise speed: 127 km/h (79 mph, 69 kn) (50% power)
- Range: 500 km (310 mi, 270 nmi)
- Service ceiling: 4,500 m (14,800 ft)
- Rate of climb: 4 m/s (790 ft/min)
