= Morane-Saulnier MS.140 =

MS.140
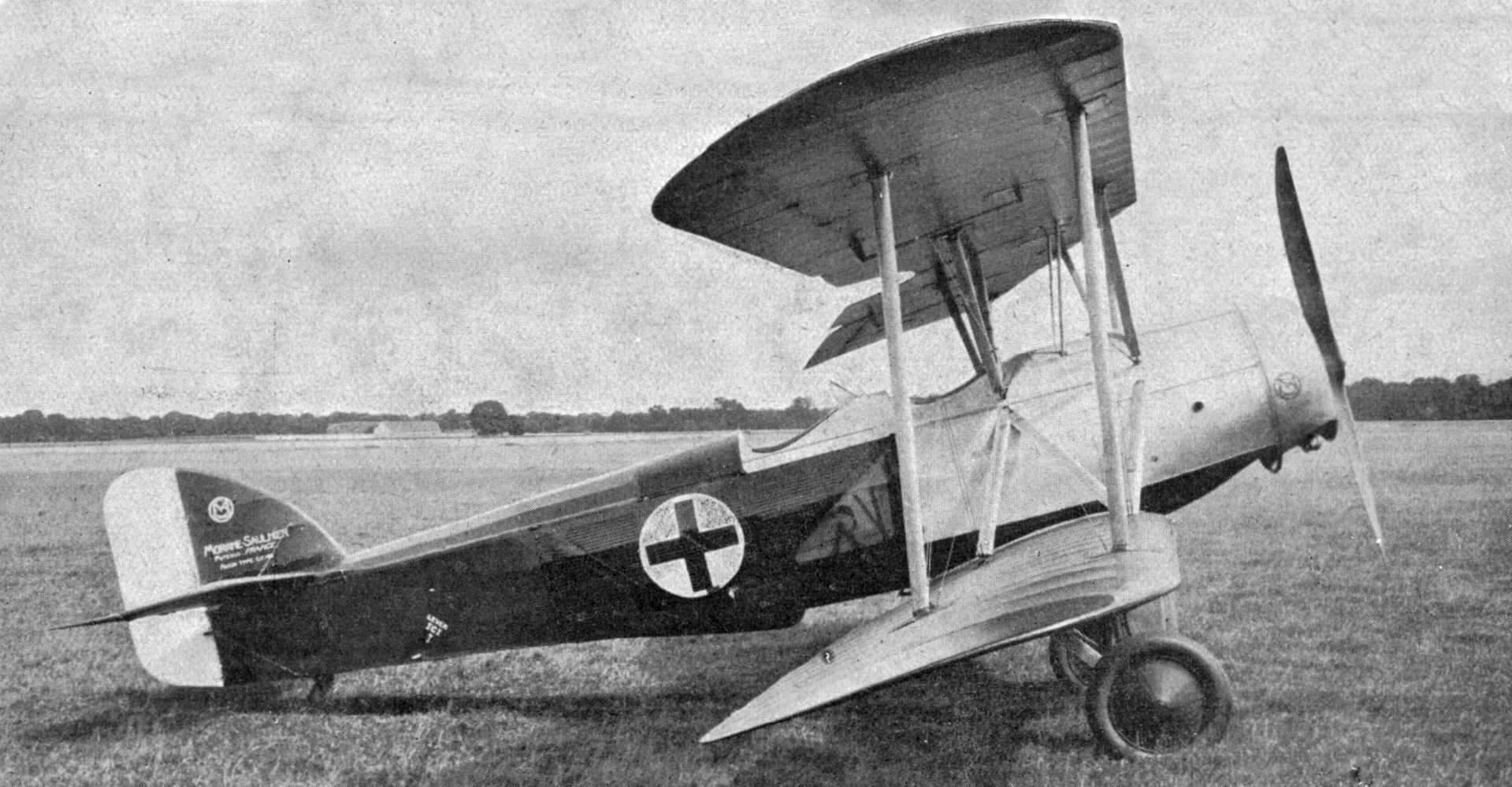

General information
- Type: Air ambulance/Training aircraft
- National origin: France
- Manufacturer: Morane-Saulnier
- Number built: 1

History
- First flight: c.1927

The Morane-Saulnier MS.140 was designed in France as an ambulance aircraft with the ability to operate from small fields and which could double as a trainer. Only one of these single engine, wooden biplanes was built, first flying about 1927.

== Design and development ==
The MS.140 was designed as an ambulance aircraft, with a hatch behind the pilot into which a stretcher could be slid. For maximum utility a second seat with dual control could be fitted instead, the aircraft then able to perform as a trainer.

For a 1927 design it was backward looking, particularly in it use of a rotary engine, an 80 hp (60 kW) Le Rhône 9C. It had an all wood structure with fabric covering. The MS.140 was a single bay biplane with wings of equal span but sweepback on the upper wing only. The bays were defined by pairs of parallel interplane struts. On each side a shorter pair of struts ran from the upper fuselage to the upper wing and another pair from the upper fuselage to the lower wing immediately above the attachment point of the main landing leg. The conventional undercarriage had a wide track, with single wheels on a split axle formed from V-shaped struts hinged at the fuselage lower centreline. The fuselage was square sided with a rounded decking, the pilot sitting below a cut-out in the upper wing for upward visibility. The engine was cowled.

The MS.140 had a generous wing area, giving it a low wing loading of about 25 kg/m^{3} (5 lb/ft^{2}). Combined with a high lift airfoil section, this gave it the ability to operate from very small fields.

== Operational history ==
Only one MS.140 was built and there are few reports of its history. It was noted in the Villacoublay aircraft "graveyard" in 1937 and may have been sold to the Republicans at the start of the Spanish Civil War with others from that store.

== Specifications ==
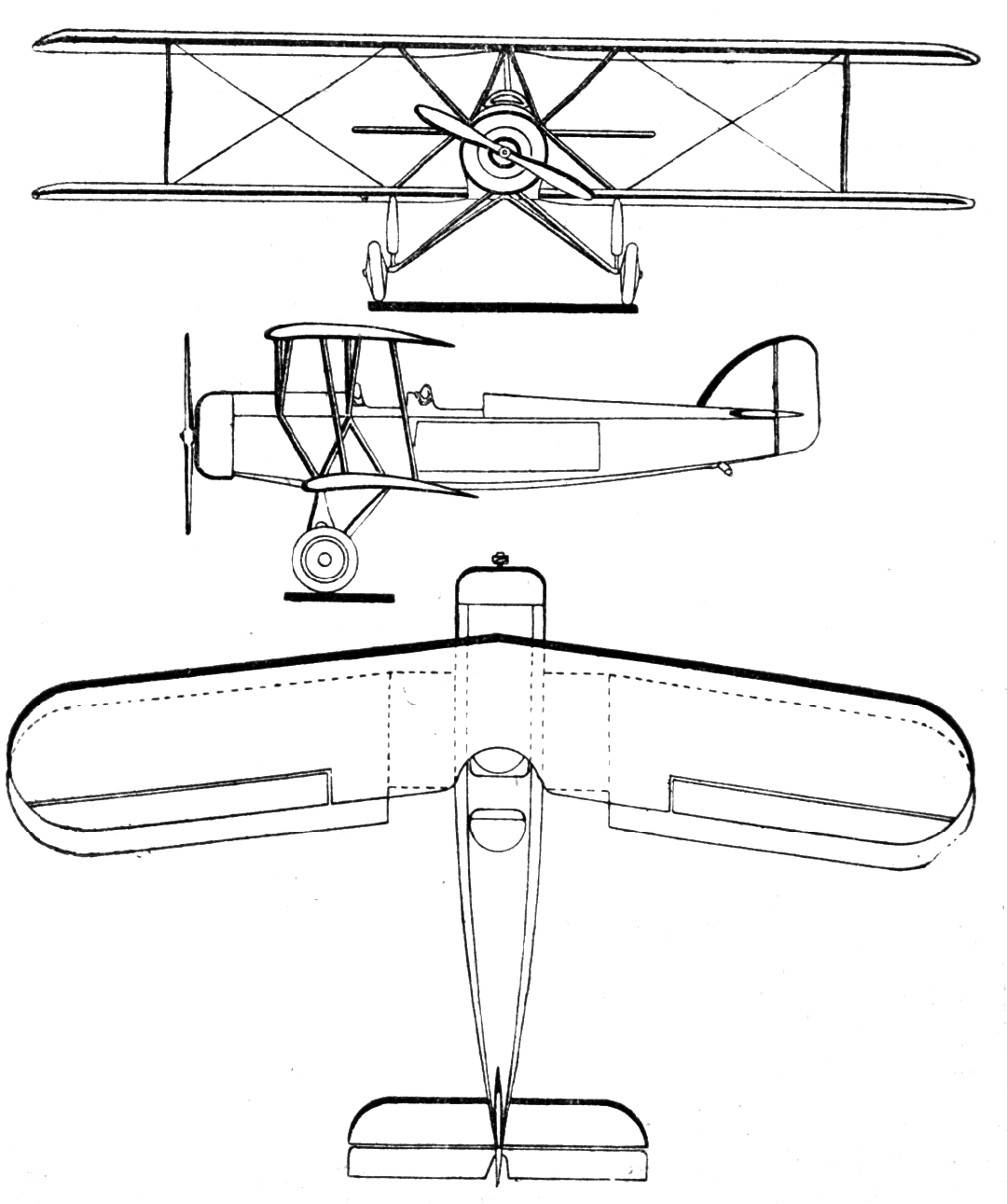
Morane Saulnier MS.140 3-view drawing from Les Ailes February 2, 1928

Data from Howson

General characteristics

- Capacity: 1
- Length: 7.43 m (24 ft 5 in)
- Wingspan: 11.1 m (36 ft 5 in)
- Height: 3.13 m (10 ft 3 in)
- Wing area: 35 m^{2} (380 sq ft)
- Empty weight: 610 kg (1,345 lb)
- Gross weight: 864 kg (1,905 lb)
- Powerplant: 1 × Le Rhône 9C 9-cylinder rotary engine, 60 kW (80 hp)
- Propellers: 2-bladed

Performance

- Maximum speed: 131 km/h (81 mph, 71 kn)
