= Morane-Saulnier N =

French WW1 fighter aircraft

Type N
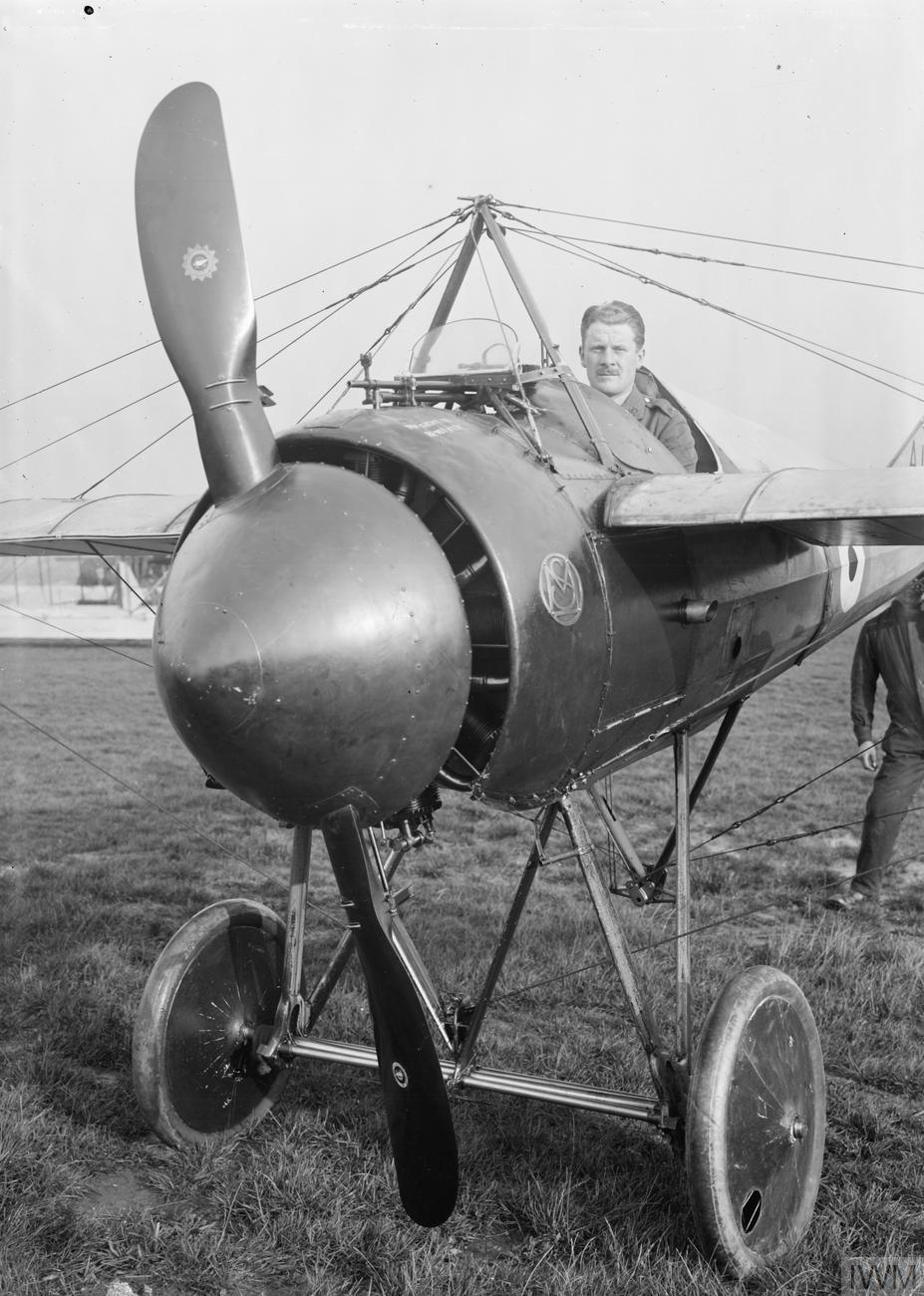
- RFC Morane-Saulnier Type N Bullet, fitted with the immense "casserole" spinner

General information
- Type: fighter
- Manufacturer: Aéroplanes Morane-Saulnier
- Primary users: Aéronautique Militaire Royal Flying Corps; Imperial Russian Air Service
- Number built: 49

History
- Introduction date: 1915
- First flight: 22 July 1914
- Variants: Morane-Saulnier I Morane-Saulnier V

The Morane-Saulnier N, also known as the Morane-Saulnier Type N, was a French monoplane fighter aircraft of the First World War. Designed and manufactured by Morane-Saulnier, the Type N entered service in April 1915 with the Aéronautique Militaire designated as the MoS-5 C1. It also equipped four squadrons of the Royal Flying Corps, in which it was nicknamed the Bullet, and was operated in limited numbers by the 19th Squadron of the Imperial Russian Air Force.

== Description ==
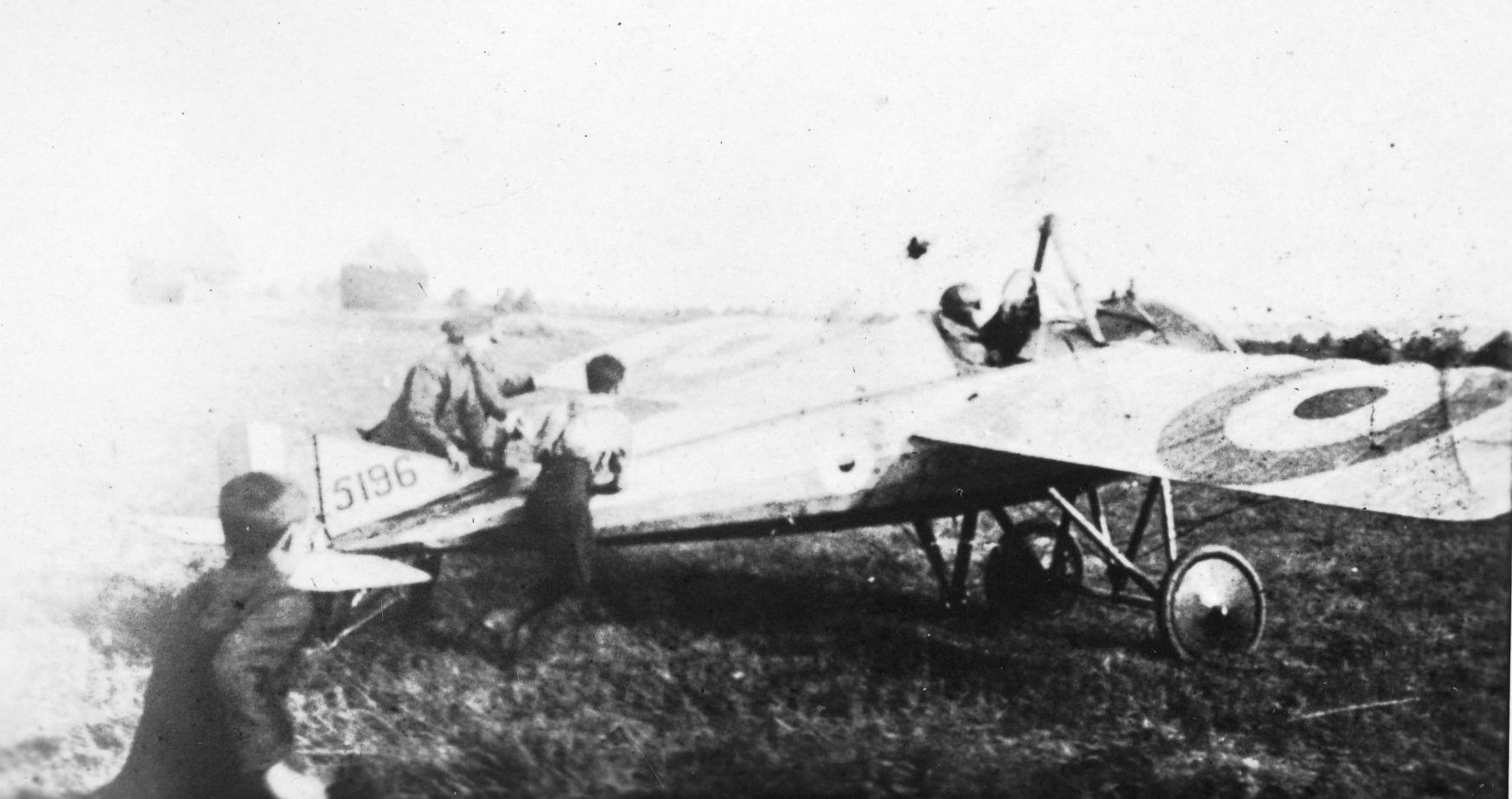
RFC Morane-Saulnier N

While the Type N was a clean, streamlined aircraft, it was not easy to fly due to a combination of stiff lateral control caused by using wing warping instead of ailerons, sensitive pitch and yaw controls caused by using an all flying tail, and very high landing speed for the period. The Type N mounted a single unsynchronized forward-firing 7.9 mm Hotchkiss machine gun which used the deflector wedges first used on the Morane-Saulnier Type L, in order to fire through the propeller arc. The later I and V types used a .303-in Vickers machine gun.

A large metal "casserolle" spinner, appearing much like those used on the Deperdussin Monocoque pre-war racer of 1912, was designed to streamline the aircraft; but caused the engines to overheat. In 1915, the spinners were removed and the overheating problems disappeared with little loss in performance.

Morane-Saulnier manufactured 49 aircraft but the model was quickly rendered obsolete by the pace of aircraft development at that time.

== Variants ==
Morane-Saulnier Type N
Single-seat fighter-scout monoplane.
Morane-Saulnier Type Nm
The Type Nm had a modified tail unit. Built in small numbers.
Morane-Saulnier I
more powerful version with 110 Le Rhône 9J.
Morane-Saulnier V
Longer range version of I.

== Operators ==
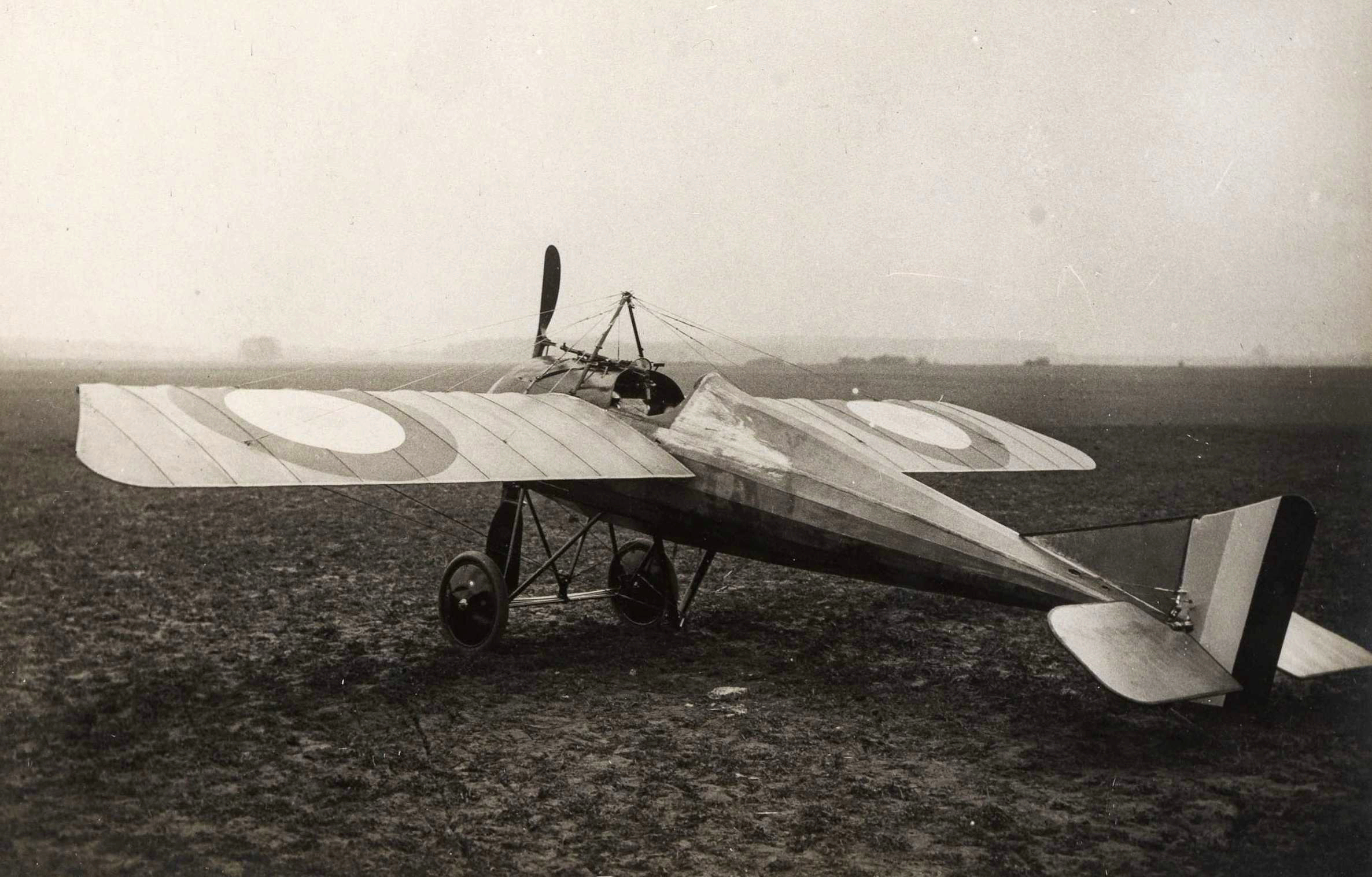
French Morane-Saulnier N in 1916

France

- Aeronautique Militaire

Russian Empire

- Imperial Russian Air Force

Ukrainian People's Republic

- Ukrainian People's Republic Air Fleet - Three aircraft.

United Kingdom

- Royal Flying Corps
  - No. 4 Squadron RFC
  - No. 60 Squadron RFC

== Specifications (Type N) ==
Data from War Planes of the First World War :Volume Five

General characteristics

- Crew: 1
- Length: 5.83 m (19 ft 2 in)
- Wingspan: 8.15 m (26 ft 9 in)
- Height: 2.25 m (7 ft 5 in)
- Wing area: 11 m^{2} (120 sq ft)
- Empty weight: 288 kg (635 lb)
- Gross weight: 444 kg (979 lb)
- Powerplant: 1 × Le Rhône 9C 9-cylinder air-cooled rotary engine, 60 kW (80 hp)

Performance

- Maximum speed: 144 km/h (89 mph, 78 kn)
- Range: 225 km (140 mi, 121 nmi)
- Endurance: 1 hour 30 minutes
- Service ceiling: 4,000 m (13,000 ft)
- Time to altitude: 2,000 m (6,600 ft) in 10 minutes

Armament

- Guns: 1 x .303 in (7.7 mm) Vickers machine gun or .31 in (7.9 mm) Hotchkiss

== See also ==
Related development

- Morane-Saulnier L
- Circa Reproductions Morane Saulnier N, a modern reproduction

Aircraft of comparable role, configuration, and era

- Fokker Eindecker
- Bristol M.1

== Bibliography ==
- Bruce, J.M. (1996). Morane-Saulnier Types N, I, V. Windsock Datafile 58. Hertfordshire, UK: Albatros Publications. ASIN B00FEK5A4M.
- Bruce, J.M. War Planes of the First World War: Fighters: Volume Five. London: Macdonald, 1972. ISBN 978-0-356-03779-0.
- Bruce, Jack. "The Bullets and the Guns". Air Enthusiast. No. 9, February–May 1979. pp. 61–75. ISSN 0143-5450
- Davilla, Dr. James J.; Soltan, Arthur (1997). French Aircraft of the First World War. Mountain View, CA: Flying Machines Press. ISBN 978-1891268090.
