= Morane-Saulnier MS.138 =

MS.137, MS.138, and MS.139
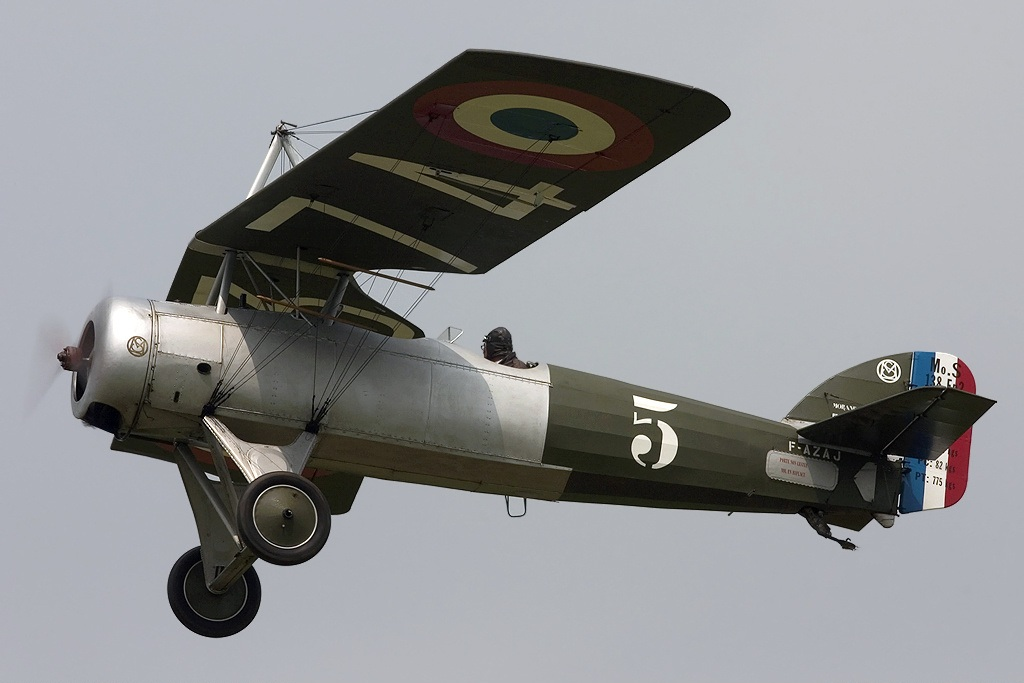
- Preserved Morane-Saulnier MS.138 in 2007

General information
- Type: Military trainer
- National origin: France
- Manufacturer: Morane-Saulnier
- Number built: 178

History
- First flight: 1927

The Morane-Saulnier MS.138 was a military trainer aircraft produced in France in the late 1920s,

== Design and operation ==
The MS.138 was the major production version of a family that also included the MS.137 and MS.139. The design was derived from the MS.35, first flown during World War I, modernised to feature a wing that now included slight sweepback, and a redesigned fuselage of rounder cross-section. The basic layout remained the same, being a wire-braced, parasol-wing monoplane with open cockpits in tandem and fixed tailskid undercarriage. Construction was mostly of wood, with the exception of the metal wing spars, and all control surfaces were covered in fabric.

Most of the production run went to the Aéronautique Militaire, with a few others built for the Aéronavale and for military use by Greece and Denmark. Thirty-three others were purchased by civilian operators in France. The type remained in French military service until 1935.

== Variants ==
MS.137
version with 89 kW (120 hp) Salmson 9Ac engine
MS.138
main production type with 60 kW (80 hp) Le Rhône 9C engine
MS.139
version with 97 kW (130 hp) Clerget 9B engine
MS.191
version with shortened wingspan and 97 kW (130 hp) Clerget 9B engine.

== Operators ==
France

- Aéronautique Militaire
- Aéronavale

Denmark
Greece

- Hellenic Air Force

Paraguay

- Paraguayan Air Force

== Specifications (MS.138) ==
Data from The Illustrated Encyclopedia of Aircraft, Jane's all the World's Aircraft 1928

General characteristics

- Crew: 2
- Length: 6.855 m (22 ft 6 in)
- Wingspan: 10.9 m (35 ft 9 in)
- Height: 3.575 m (11 ft 9 in)
- Wing area: 19.4 m^{2} (209 sq ft)
- Empty weight: 517 kg (1,140 lb)
- Gross weight: 772 kg (1,702 lb)
- Fuel capacity: 80 L (21 US gal; 18 imp gal)
- Powerplant: 1 × Le Rhône 9C 9-cylinder air-cooled rotary piston engine, 60 kW (80 hp)
- Propellers: 2-bladed fixed pitch propeller

Performance

- Maximum speed: 135 km/h (84 mph, 73 kn)

131.5 km/h (81.7 mph; 71.0 kn) at 1,000 m (3,300 ft)
128 km/h (80 mph; 69 kn) at 2,000 m (6,600 ft)
124 km/h (77 mph; 67 kn) at 3,000 m (9,800 ft)

- Service ceiling: 4,000 m (13,000 ft)
- Time to altitude: 1,000 m (3,300 ft) in 9 minutes 6 seconds; 2,000 m (6,600 ft) in 21 minutes 11 seconds; 3,000 m (9,800 ft) in 39 minutes 5 seconds;
- Wing loading: 39.9 kg/m^{2} (8.2 lb/sq ft)
- Power/mass: 0.077 kW/kg (0.047 hp/lb)

== See also ==
Related lists

- List of Interwar military aircraft
