= Morane-Saulnier V =

French WW1 fighter aircraft

Type V

General information
- Type: Fighter
- National origin: France
- Manufacturer: Morane-Saulnier
- Primary user: Royal Flying Corps; Imperial Russian Air Service
- Number built: 30

History
- Introduction date: RFC - 13 May 1916; IRAS - 1 April 1917
- First flight: April 1916
- Retired: RFC - 19 October 1916; IRAS - late 1917

The Morane-Saulnier V, also known as the Morane-Saulnier Type V, was a French fighter of the 1910s.

== Development ==
Developed in parallel with the Morane-Saulnier I, the Type V was similar to the I but was larger with a three-hour endurance. It also differed in that it had larger wing and deepened ventral contours to accommodate extra fuel tanks. An intended development fitted with ailerons was planned as the Morane-Saulnier U, but was not flown.

== Operational history ==
Developed at the beginning of 1916, the Type V was intended primarily to meet a Royal Flying Corps requirement, and the service of the Type V was officially accepted in May 1916. However, like the Type I, the aircraft proved to be unpopular across-the-board and the Type V was retired from service only 5 months later. However, in 1917 18 aircraft were in service with the Imperial Russian Air Service (IRAS). It is believed that these were acquired by the Bolshevik Red Air Fleet during the Russian Revolution.

== Operators ==
United Kingdom

- Royal Flying Corps

Russian Empire

- Imperial Russian Air Service

Soviet Union

- Soviet Air Force - Aircraft taken from IRAS during Russian Revolution

== Variants ==
Morane-Saulnier V
company designation
MS.22
official French government STAe designation for the V

== Specifications ==
General characteristics

- Crew: 1
- Length: 5.81 m (19 ft 1 in)
- Wingspan: 8.75 m (28 ft 8 in)
- Powerplant: 1 × Le Rhône 9J nine-cylinder rotary engine , 82 kW (110 hp)

Performance

- Maximum speed: 165 km/h (102 mph, 89 kn)
- Endurance: 3 hours 0 minutes

Armament

- 1 x 7.7mm cockpit-mounted Vickers gun

== Bibliography ==
- Bruce, Jack. "The Bullets and the Guns". Air Enthusiast. Nine, February–May 1979. pp. 61–75. ISSN 0143-5450
- Davilla, Dr. James J.; Soltan, Arthur (1997). French Aircraft of the First World War. Mountain View, CA: Flying Machines Press. ISBN 978-1891268090.
- Green, William; Gordon Swanborough. The Complete Book of Fighters. Godalming, UK: Salamander Books. p. 414.
