= Morane-Saulnier AR =

Type AR, MS.35
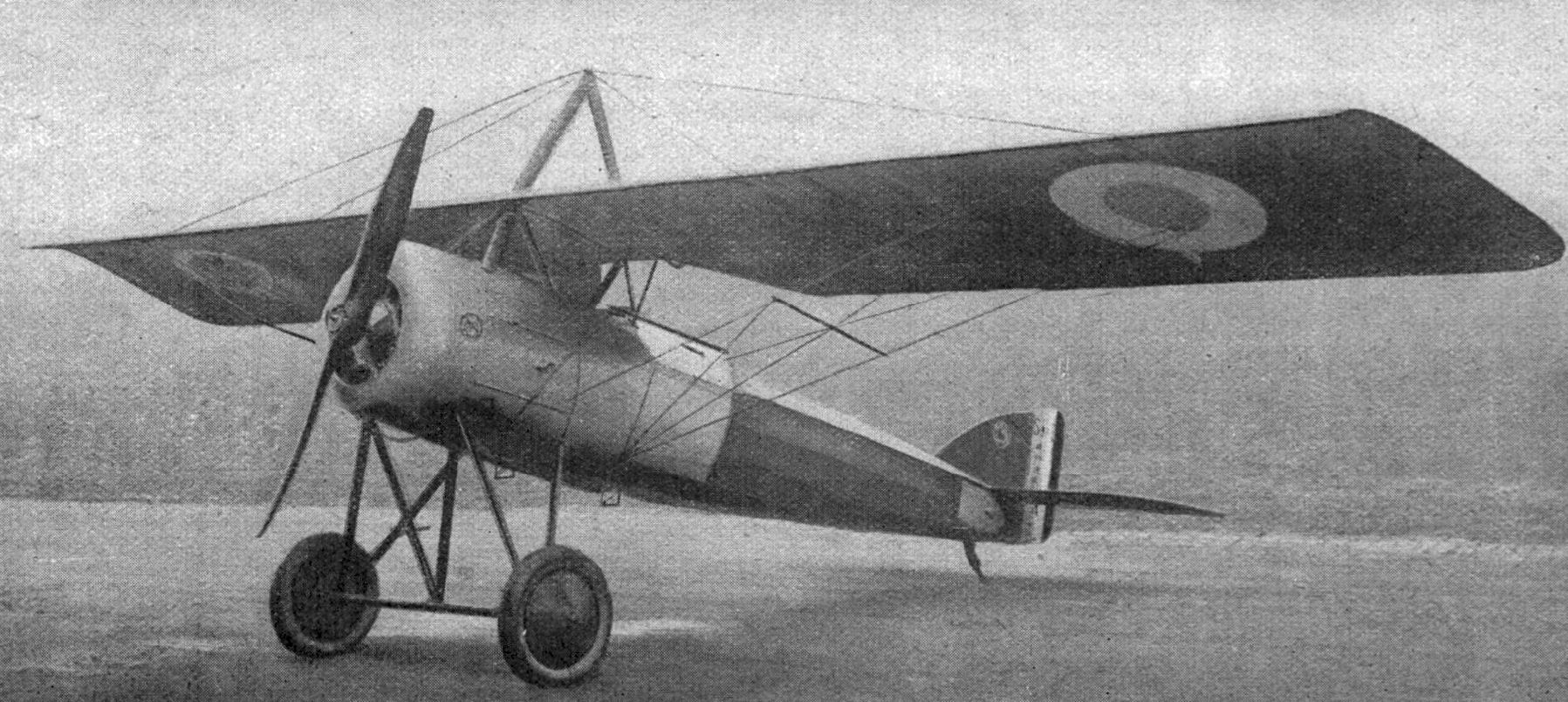
- MS.35R

General information
- Type: Trainer
- National origin: France
- Manufacturer: Morane-Saulnier
- Primary user: Aéronautique Militaire
- Number built: >400

History
- First flight: 1915

The Morane-Saulnier AR was a trainer aircraft produced in France during and after the First World War.

== Design and development ==
Developed from the Morane-Saulnier LA reconnaissance aircraft, the AR was a wire-braced parasol-wing monoplane of conventional design with two open cockpits in tandem and cross-axle-style tailskid undercarriage. Construction was mostly of fabric-covered wood, but the forward fuselage was skinned in metal.

Large-scale production commenced after the Armistice, with the type now designated MS.35, in a number of subtypes differentiated principally in the engine used. Although Morane-Saulnier hoped to sell the type on the civil market as a touring machine, most of the 400 examples built saw service with the French Army, but others were used by the Navy, and still others were exported to foreign air arms. The MS.35s were used in France until 1929, when some of them were purchased by the country's flying clubs.

== Variants ==
- Type AR
- MS.35R - main production version with Le Rhône 9C engine
- MS.35A - version with Anzani engine
- MS.35C - version with Clerget 9C engine

== Operators ==
France

- Aéronautique Militaire
  - Écoles de pilotage
- Aéronautique Navale

Argentina

- Argentine Air Force

Belgium

- Belgian Air Force

Bolivia

- Bolivian Air Force

Brazil

- Brazilian Air Force

Greece

- Hellenic Air Force

Guatemala

- Guatemalan Air Force

Paraguay

- Paraguayan Air Force

Poland

- (70 examples)

Romania

- Royal Romanian Air Force

Soviet Union

- Soviet Air Force - (60 examples)

Switzerland

- Swiss Air Force

Turkey

- Turkish Air Force

United States

- United States Navy

Uruguay

- Uruguayan Air Force

== Specifications (MS.35R) ==
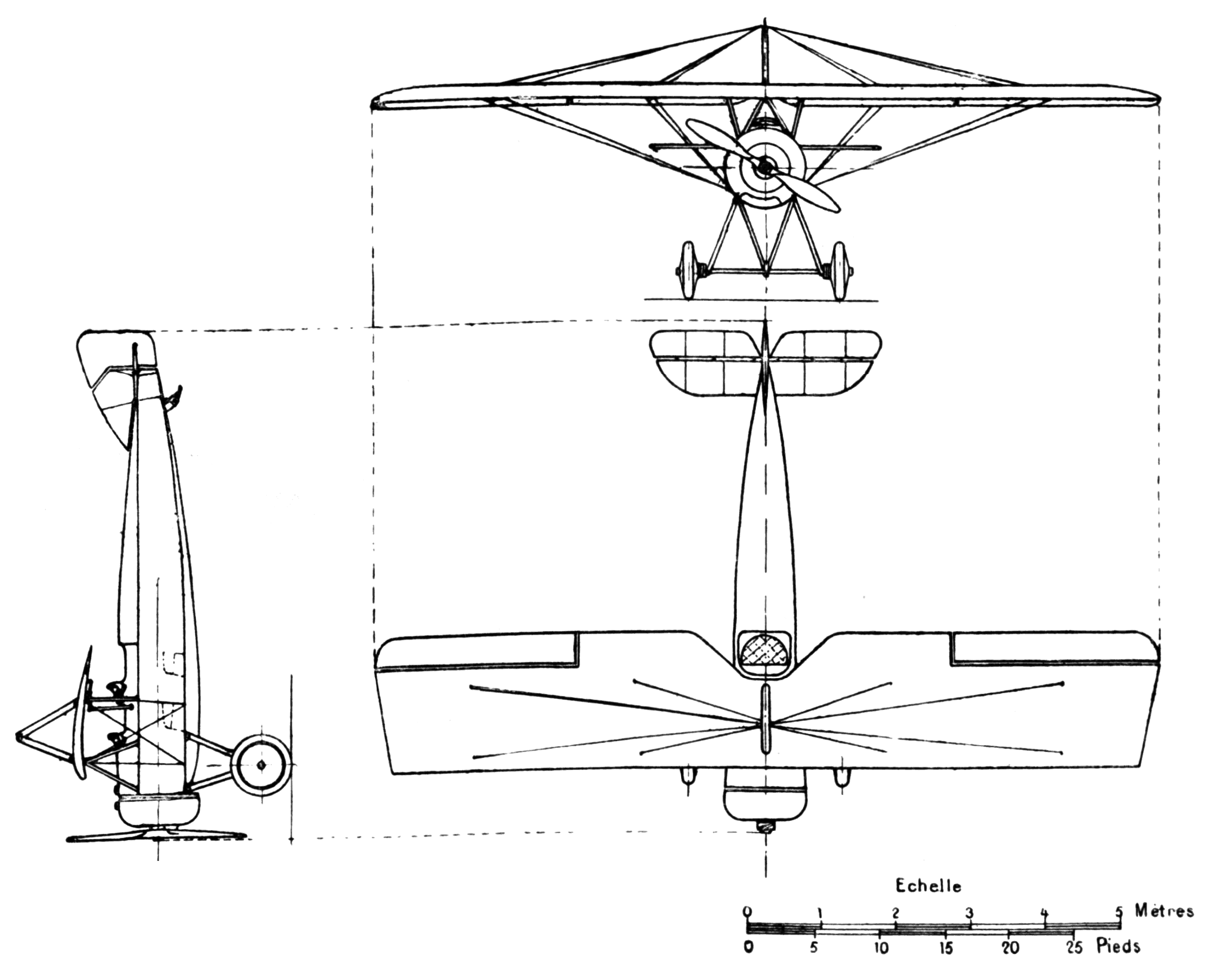
Morane Saulnier MS.35R 3-view drawing from L'Aéronautique July,1927

Data from "Morane-Saulnier Type AR (M.S.35)"

General characteristics

- Crew: Two, pilot and instructor
- Length: 6.30 m (20 ft 8 in)
- Wingspan: 10.57 m (34 ft 8 in)
- Gross weight: 764 kg (1,680 lb)
- Powerplant: 1 × Le Rhône 9C , 60 kW (80 hp)

Performance

- Maximum speed: 125 km/h (78 mph, 68 kn)
- Service ceiling: 4,600 m (15,100 ft)
