= Moyes Microlights =

Australian aircraft manufacturer

Moyes Microlights Pty Ltd
- Company type: Privately held company
- Industry: Aerospace
- Headquarters: Waverley, New South Wales, Australia
- Products: Ultralight aircraft
- Owner: Bill Moyes
- Website: liteflite.com.au

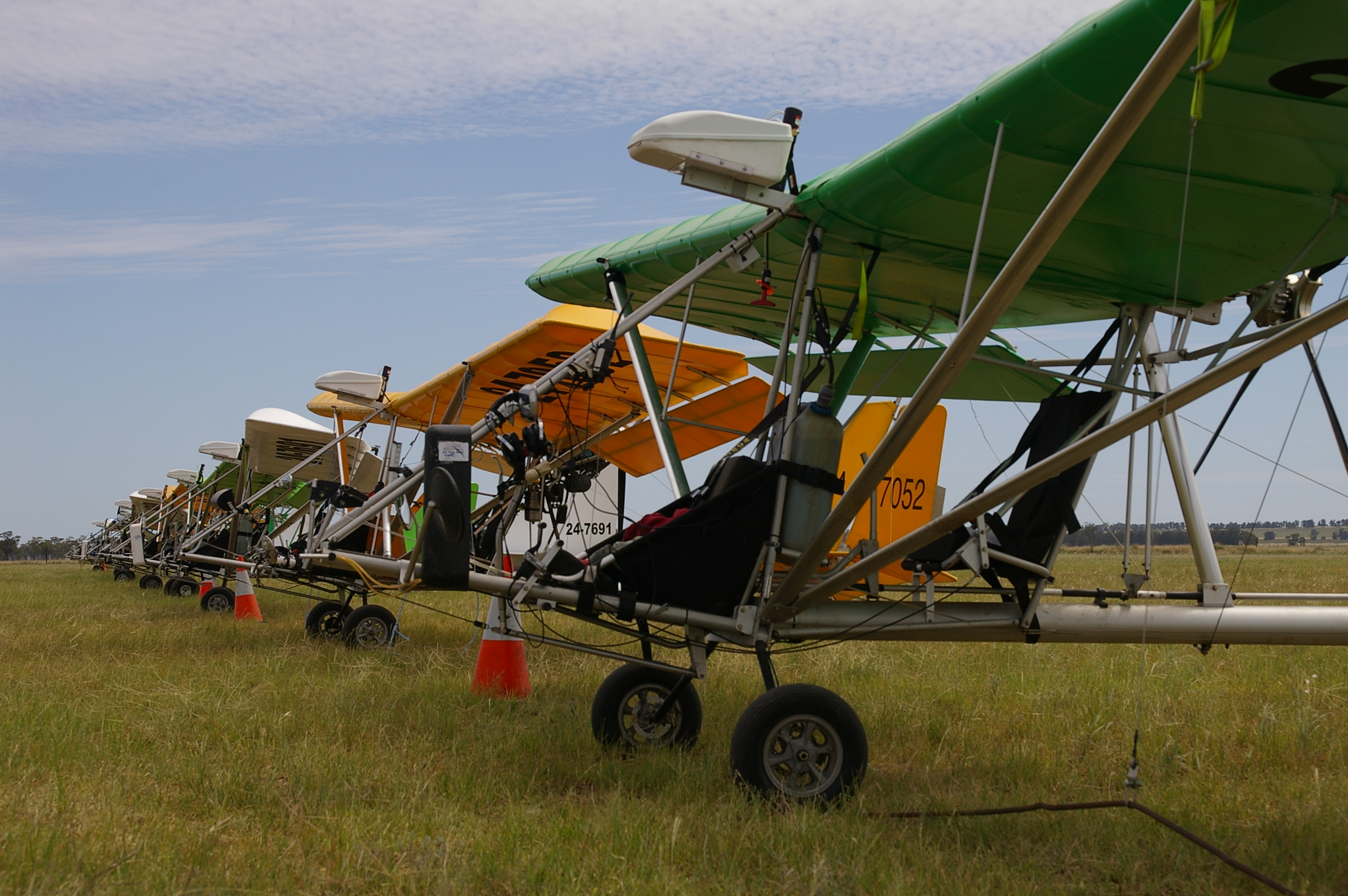
The fleet of Moyes Dragonflies at Forbes, New South Wales, Australia.

Moyes Microlights Pty Ltd is an Australian aircraft manufacturer that was based in Waverley, New South Wales and founded by hang gliding pioneer Bill Moyes. The company specializes in the design and manufacture of ultralight aircraft in the form of kits for amateur construction and ready-to-fly aircraft.

For a time in the early 2000s the company was called Bailey-Moyes Microlights Pty Ltd and sometimes Moyes Aviation.

In the early 2000s the company was renamed LiteFlite Pty Ltd and moved to Botany, New South Wales to continue production of the Dragonfly. Liteflite continues to be owned by Bill Moyes.

An associated company is Moyes Delta Gliders, which builds hang gliders, including the Moyes Litespeed line, in Kurnell, New South Wales.

== Products ==
The company's first product was an ultralight aircraft specifically designed for towing hang gliders, the Bailey-Moyes Dragonfly, which remains in production. Another design produced was the Bailey-Moyes Tempest, a single seat ultralight sailplane designed by Bob Bailey and now out of production. Also produced for a time was the Moyes Connie, a single-seat amphibious ultralight Guy Delage design.

== Aircraft on display ==
The Massey Air Museum, in Massey, Maryland, United States has two Moyes aircraft, a Tempest and a Dragonfly, on display.

== Aircraft ==
Summary of aircraft built by Moyes Microlights
Model name	First flight	Number built	Type
Moyes Connie			single seat amphibious ultralight aircraft
Bailey-Moyes Dragonfly	1990	over 100 (2011)	two seat hang glider tug
Bailey-Moyes Tempest		12 (2001)	single seat ultralight sailplane
