= Moyes Delta Gliders =

Australian aircraft manufacturer

- Company type: Privately held company
- Industry: Aerospace
- Founded: 1967
- Founder: Bill Moyes
- Headquarters: Kurnell, New South Wales, Australia
- Products: Hang gliders
- Website: www.moyes.com.au

Moyes Delta Gliders is an Australian aircraft manufacturer based in Kurnell, New South Wales. The company was founded by Bill Moyes in 1967 and specializes in the design and manufacture of hang gliders. The company's designs have won many world, national and regional championships.

One of the oldest hang glider manufacturers in the world, the company's Litespeed line monopolized world competition throughout the 2000s.

An affiliated company, Moyes Microlights, builds the Moyes Dragonfly hang glider tug and at one time built the Moyes Tempest microlight sailplane.

== History ==
Founded in 1967 by Bill Moyes, a pioneer hang glider pilot, the company started building Moyes' own glider designs for towing behind boats initially. Moyes turned to mountain foot launching in 1968 at Mount Crackenback in the Australian Alps and glider designs developed accordingly. In early competition Moyes won many titles and awards. He retired from competition in 1974 to concentrate on glider design and production, while his son, Steve Moyes, took up competition flying for the Moyes brand.

In November 2014 the company moved from its longstanding location in Botany, New South Wales to Kurnell, New South Wales.

Bill Moyes died in September 2024.

== Aircraft ==
Summary of aircraft built by Moyes Delta Gliders
| Model name | First flight | Number built | Type |
|---|---|---|---|
| Moyes CXS | | | hang glider |
| Moyes GTR | | | hang glider |
| Moyes Litespeed | | | hang glider |
| Moyes Litesport | | | hang glider |
| Moyes Malibu | | | hang glider |
| Moyes Max | | | hang glider |
| Moyes Mega | | | hang glider |
| Moyes Mission | | | hang glider |
| Moyes Sonic | | | hang glider |
| Moyes Ventura | | | hang glider |
| Moyes X2 | | | hang glider |
| Moyes XL | | | hang glider |
| Moyes XS | | | hang glider |
| Moyes XT | | | hang glider |
| Moyes Xtralite | | | hang glider |
