= Ruppert Archaeopteryx =

Swiss microlift glider

Archaeopteryx
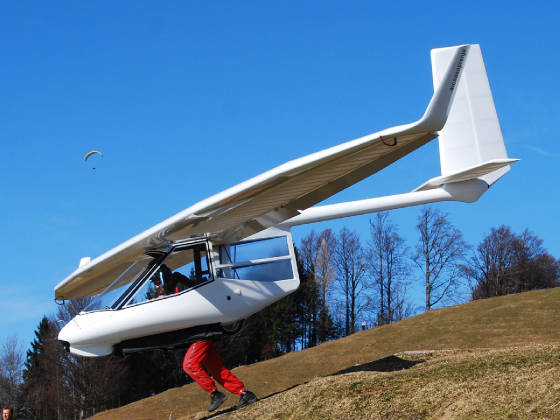
- Archaeopteryx Race being footlaunched

General information
- Type: Glider
- National origin: Switzerland
- Manufacturer: Ruppert Composite GmbH
- Designer: Roger Ruppert
- Status: In series production
- Number built: 42 (Dec 2025)

History
- Manufactured: 2010-present
- Introduction date: 2001
- First flight: September 2001

The Ruppert Archaeopteryx (English: ancient wing) is a Swiss high-wing, pod-and-boom, single-seat, microlift glider that was designed by Roger Ruppert and is produced by Ruppert Composite GmbH.

The aircraft is named for the feathered Archaeopteryx dinosaur that lived during the Late Jurassic Period in what is now Europe.

== Design and development ==
The Archaeopteryx was conceived as a foot-launchable microlift sailplane, with the design goals of a light empty weight, low stall speed with gentle stall characteristics, good maneuverability and good high speed performance. A further goal was a sailplane that could be foot-launched in zero wind conditions.

The Archaeopteryx design started in 1998 at the Zurich University of Applied Sciences (ZHAW) as a research project. The first flight of the initial prototype was in September 2001. Based on initial lessons the prototype was modified and reflown in May 2002. Further flight tests and modifications were carried out, with the prototype re-flying in its new form in March 2003. The production prototype design was started in 2006 and completed in 2009. The first series production started in the summer of 2009 and production deliveries to customers commenced in May 2010. As of September 2023, 38 aircraft had been delivered to customers in Australia, Argentina, Germany, France, Austria, USA, Canada and Switzerland. Most are using the electrical propulsion.

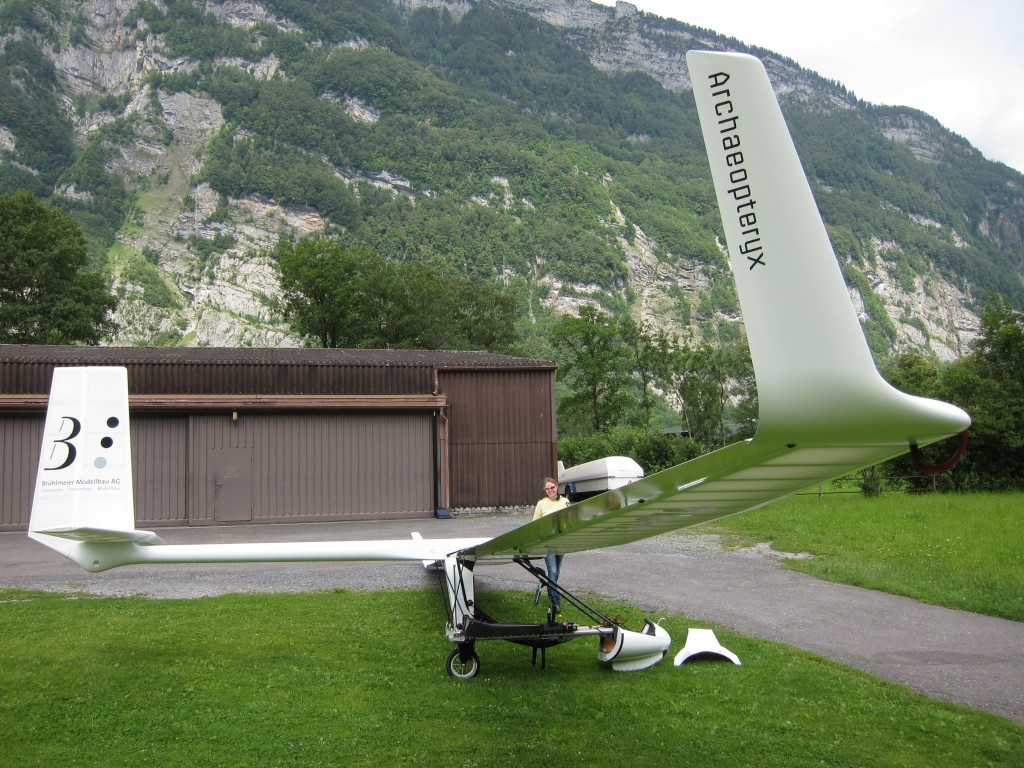
Archaeopteryx standard version, Mollis, June 2011

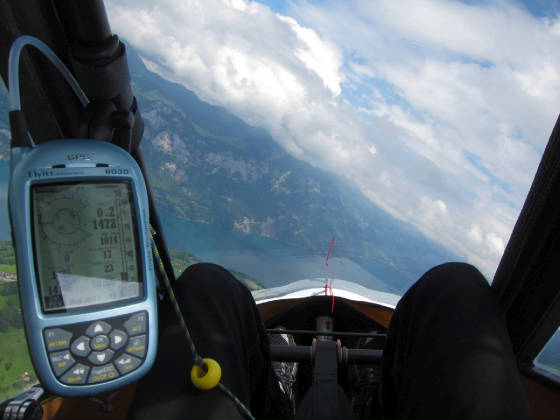
View from inside Archaeopteryx during flight

Archaeopteryx comparison

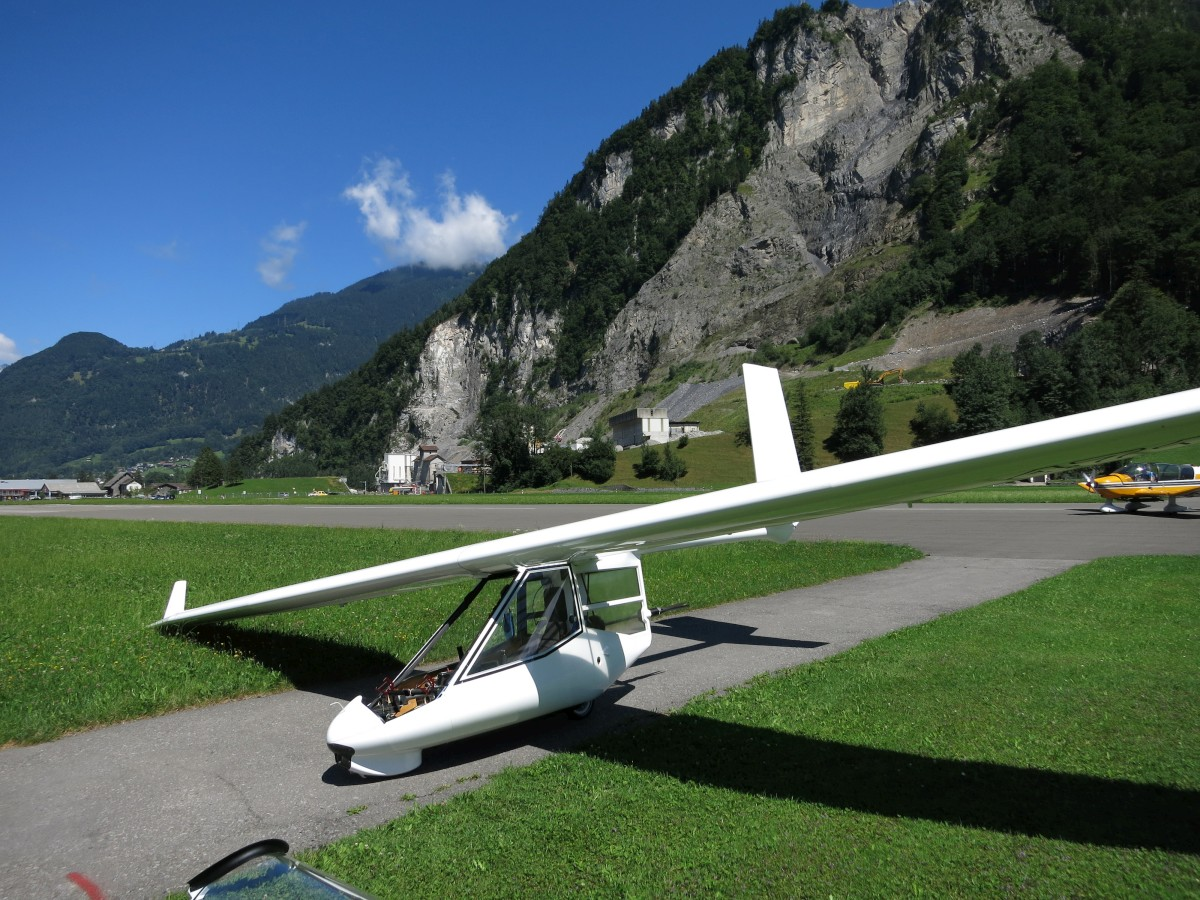
Archaeopteryx with factory electrical motor

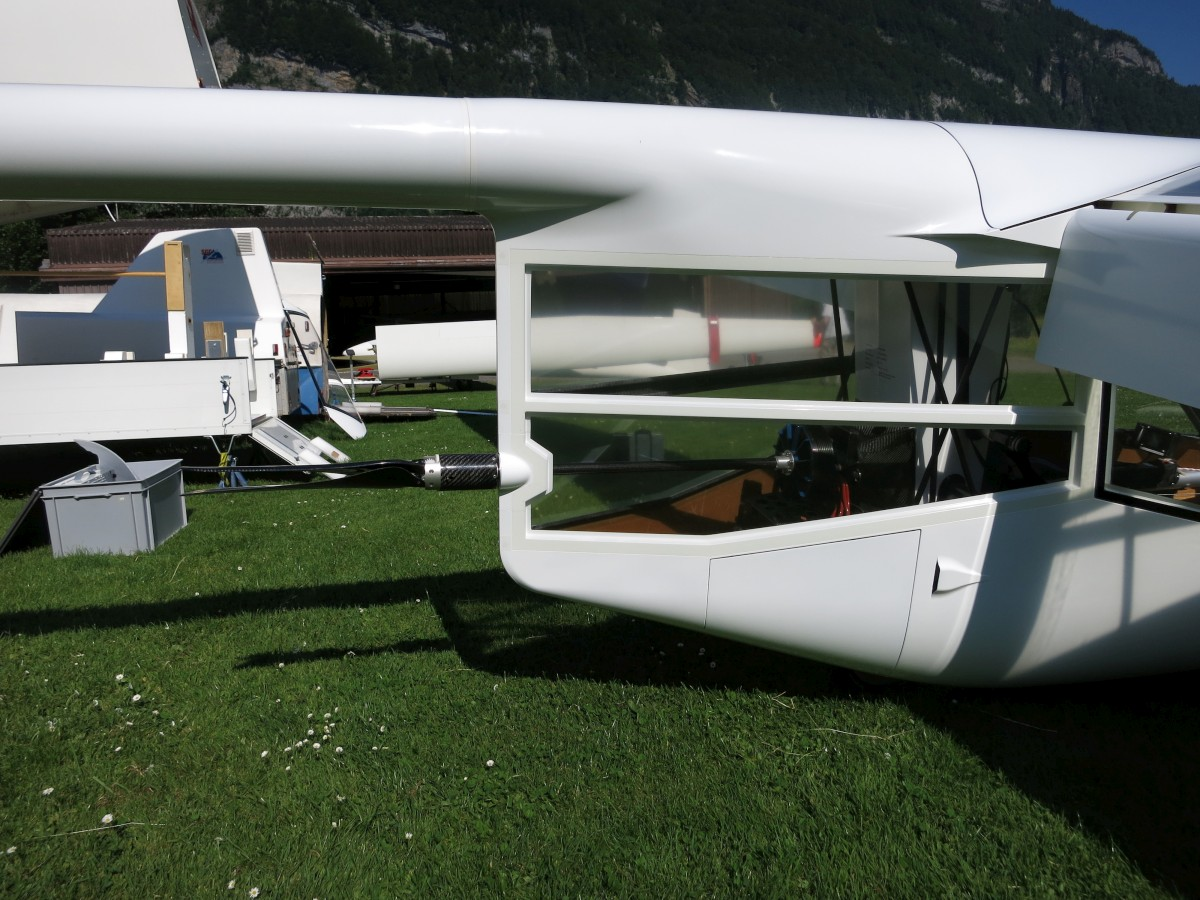
Archaeopteryx electrical motor and propeller detail

The controls are conventional, with a stick for ailerons and elevator and rudder pedals. The aircraft uses flaps for glidepath control, which function as airbrakes when set to 45-70 degrees. A ballistic parachute with an area of 62 m^{2} (670 sq ft) is also fitted. The aircraft can be rigged for flight by one person in 15 minutes. It has been launched by foot, aero-tow, bungee launch, auto-tow and winch-launch. Typically take-off and landing are on the main wheel. For foot launch, the bottom cover is opened to stick the legs out. A foot landing has been performed to achieve the FAA class 2 certification.

The aircraft can accommodate pilots from 165 to 195 cm (65 to 77 in) in height and 55 to 100 kg (121 to 220 lb).

The company further developed a prototype equipped with two electric motors to provide self-launch capability. This prototype did not have satisfactory performance, and a single electric motor version was developed instead. This electric propulsion was introduced in mid-2014 to allow self-launching. Takeoff roll distance is 50 m (160 ft) and rate of climb when fully charged is 2.5 m/s (8.2 ft/s). It can run at full power for 11 minutes on one charge. The electrical motor uses 10.5 kW at 3800 rpm, and the propeller delivers 370 N when flying at 75 km/h. Storage is a 14s1p lithium polymer battery (Kokam) with 40 Ah capacity, delivering 2.07 kWh, maximum 58.8 V and maximum continuous current of 200 amps.

== World record ==
In December 2025, at Mollorca, a first ever launch of a glider by bicycle was achieved by 9 cyclists pulling the Archaeopteryx similar to a winch launch. Together, the cyclist produced an average of 5.8kW during 90 seconds and got the glider to 100m altitude. This event was sponsored by Red Bull. Andy Hediger, who was also the initial test pilot, piloted the Archaeopteryx.

== Variants ==
Archaeopteryx Standard
Basic design without cockpit fairing
Archaeopteryx Performance
Basic design, with cockpit fairing; no longer in production
Archaeopteryx Race
Basic design, with cockpit fairing and windshield
Archaeopteryx Electric "Electeryx"
Race version with electrical propulsion

== Specifications (Standard) ==
Data from Sailplane Directory, company website and flight manual

General characteristics

- Crew: 1
- Length: 5.7 m (18 ft 10 in)
- Wingspan: 13.6 m (44 ft 7 in)
- Height: 2.9 m (9 ft 7 in)
- Wing area: 12.8 m^{2} (138 sq ft)
- Empty weight: 54 kg (119 lb)
- Gross weight: 160 kg (353 lb)
- Max takeoff weight: 191 kg (421 lb)

Performance

- Cruise speed: 57.5 km/h (35.7 mph, 31.0 kn)
- Stall speed: 30–39 km/h (19–24 mph, 16–21 kn)
- Never exceed speed: 130 km/h (81 mph, 70 kn)
- g limits: +4.0 / -2.0 at 130 km/h and +5.1 / -3.1 at 100 km/h
- Maximum glide ratio: 28:1
- Rate of sink: 0.50 m/s (98 ft/min)

Avionics

- Flytec 6030 GPS w/ Flarm

== See also ==
Aircraft of comparable role, configuration, and era

- Aériane Swift
- Hall Vector 1
- Maupin Carbon Dragon
- Rensselaer RP-1

Related lists

- List of gliders
