= Litespeed (disambiguation) =

Litespeed may refer to:

- Litespeed, a bicycle manufacturer
- Litespeed F3, a formula three racing team
- Moyes Litespeed, an Australian hang glider design
- LiteSpeed Web Server

== See also ==
- Lightspeed (disambiguation)
