= Aériane Swift =

Belgian sail plane design

Swift
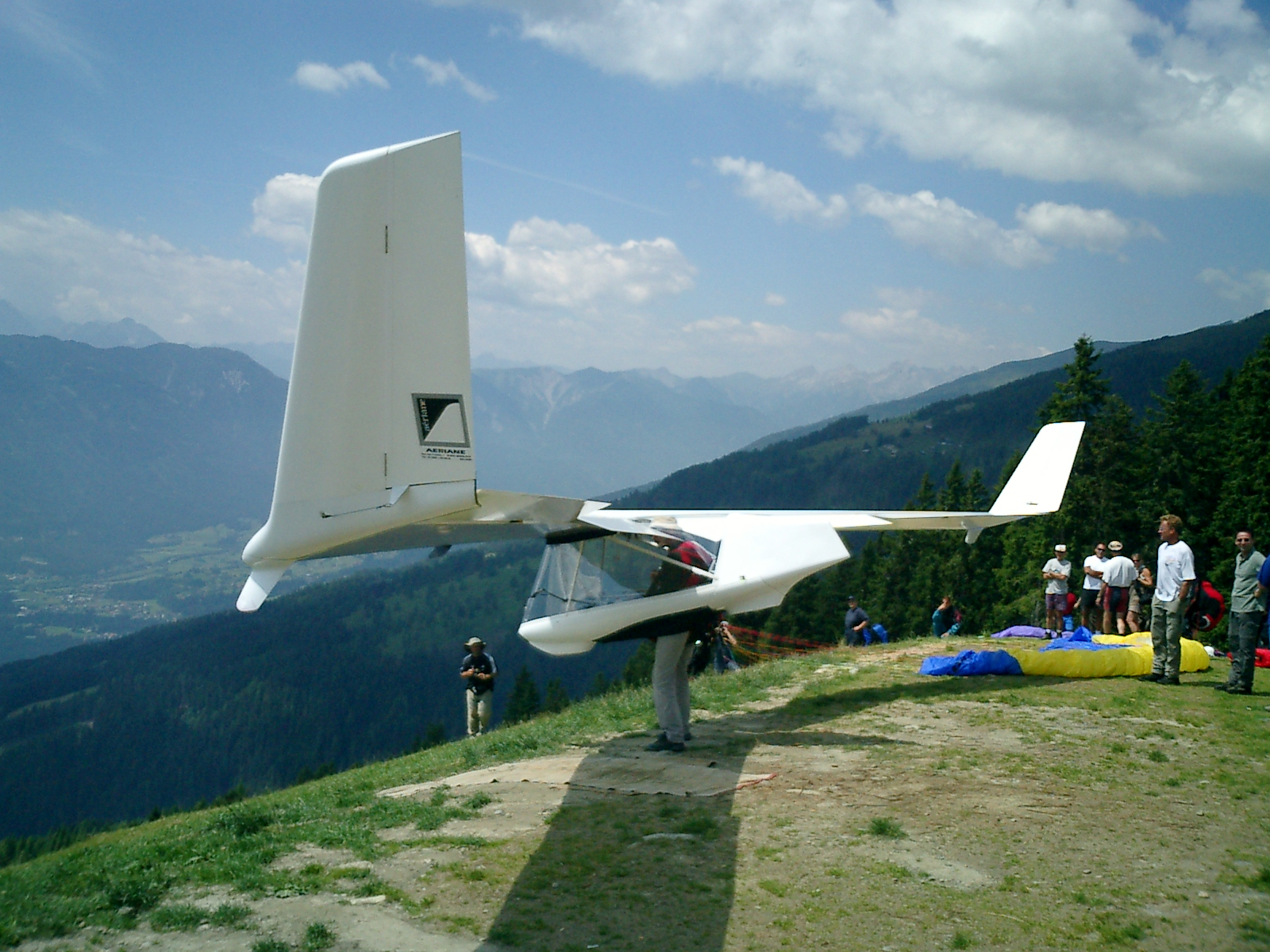

General information
- Type: Foot-launched glider
- National origin: United States
- Manufacturer: Aériane
- Designer: Bright Star Gliders and Stanford University.

History
- First flight: 1989
- Developed from: Bright Star Odyssey
- Developed into: Bright Star Millennium

The Aériane Swift is a lightweight (48 kg) foot-launched tailless sailplane whose rigid wings have a span of 40 feet (12 m). The Swift has been succeeded by the "Swift'Lite".

Although designed in California, Swift aircraft are now manufactured by Aériane, a European firm based in Gembloux, Belgium. Aériane first manufactured the Swift under licence, but the firm is now the sole manufacturer.

== Design & development ==
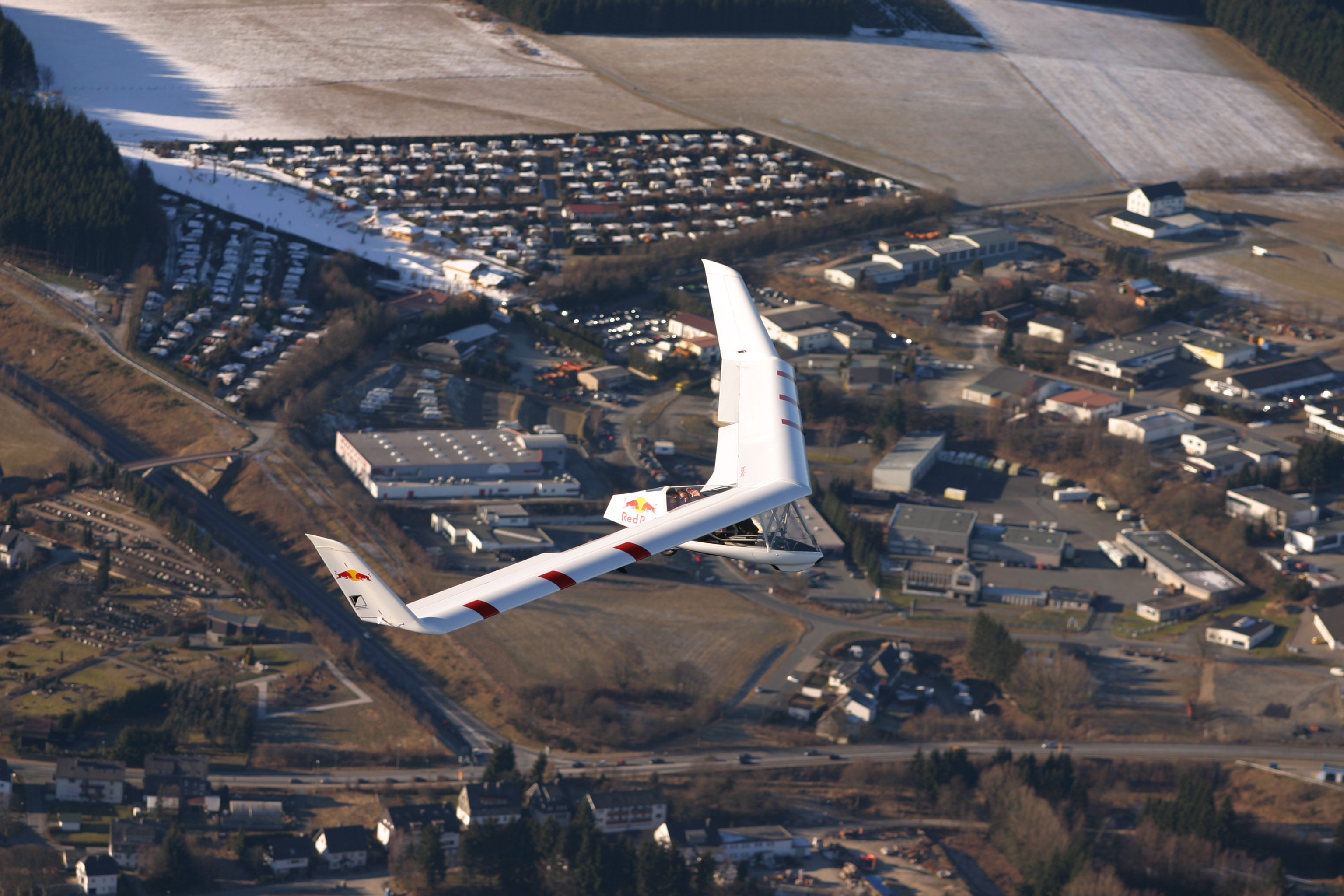
Swift'Lite glider in flight

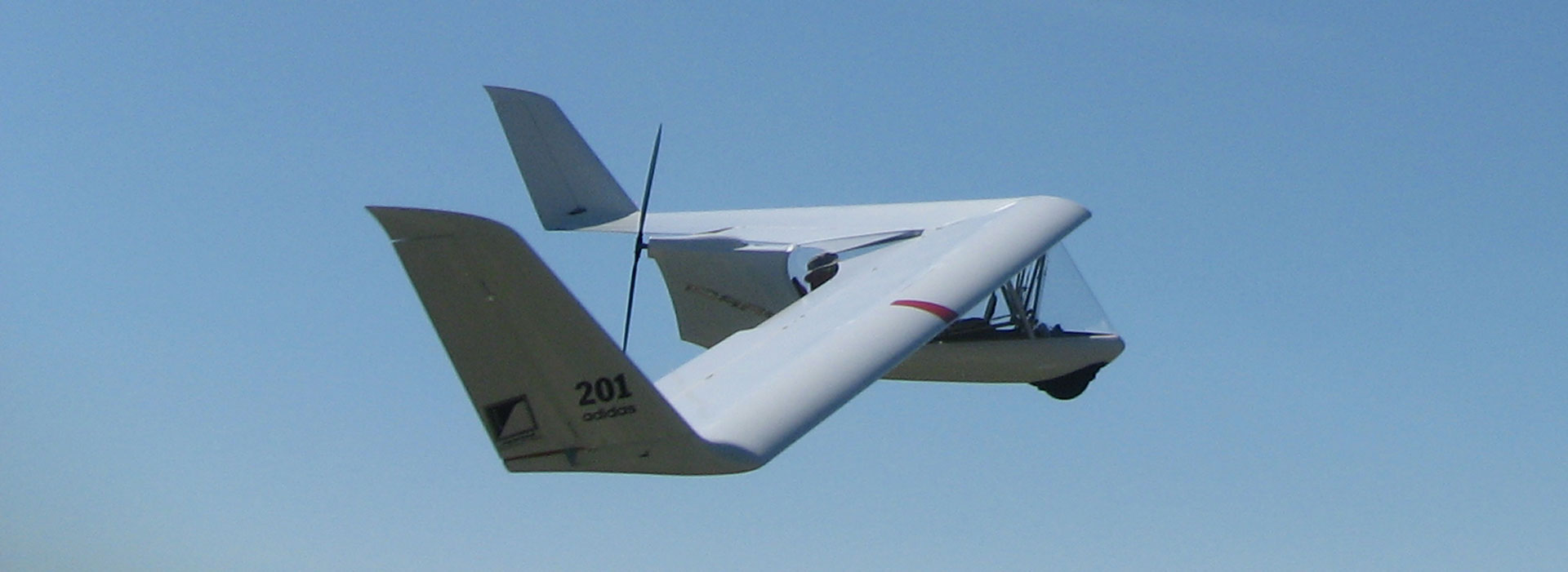
Swift single-seat lightweight motor-glider

The Swift (an acronym for 'Swept Wing with Inboard Flap for Trim') was originally conceived as a rigid hang glider with sailplane-like performance. Bright Star Gliders had developed the 1989 U.S. National Hang Gliding Championship winning Odyssey prototype. Meanwhile, Professor Ilan Kroo and a group of graduate students at Stanford University had developed the Stanford SWIFT design project. When Brian Porter of Bright Star met Stanford student Steve Morris, the projects merged. Bright Star constructed the revised SWIFT and its first flight took place in December 1989.

The swept wing has control surfaces along the entire trailing edge: flaps occupy the inner 42%, and elevons take up 58% of the outer span. Large winglets act as vertical stabilizers and the models with an enclosed cockpit also have conventional fuselage stabilising surfaces that contribute to yaw stability. The winglets on the 1989 prototype were fixed surfaces, so the pilot effected turns using the elevons.

The original Swift is now out of production, having been replaced by a refined version called the Swift'Lite. This new model has winglets that, like those on the Rutan Long-EZ, are rudders when used singly, and air-brakes when used together. In addition, compared to its predecessor, the Swift'Lite is claimed to be: 20% lighter, with lighter and more responsive controls, a lower stall speed, an improved glide ratio of 27:1, better pilot visibility and comfort, and simplified assembly procedure.

== Model range ==
A variety of different "fuselage pods" have been fitted beneath the wings to create a range of aircraft, as follows:

- the core product is the foot-launched glider (the Swift'Lite)
- a self-launching glider (the Swift-PAS) with 12 horsepower (8.9 kW) two-stroke engine, later with an 18 hp Bailey 175 four stroke engine
- a motor-glider (the P-Swift) with 25 horsepower (19 kW) 2-stroke engine
- an electric-powered variant (Swift-Light E) has 20 minutes of powered flight per charge. Power comes from an Eck-Geiger HPD-10, 10-kilowatt motor, controller and battery system, part of a setup designed and sold by Austrian hang-gliding champion Manfred Ruhmer.
- a two-seat glider used for training (the Tandem Swift)

The various fuselage frames are interchangeable and any can be added to the same basic wing. Swift gliders with engines originally had Arplast EcoProp folding propellers, which feather for soaring when then engine is turned off. Powered Swift gliders are not foot-launched, having instead two main wheels in tandem layout, and small wing-tip castors.

=== Current types ===
As of October 2020, Aériane are producing only 2 versions of the Swift'Lite:

- The Swift’Light, foot-launchable, and
- The E-Swift’Light, with an electric motor.

== Specifications (Swift'Lite) ==
data from flight manual

=== Technical data and speeds ===
- Empty weight without fairing: 48 kg
- Maximum take off weight: 158 kg (version without motor)
- Span: 12,8 m
- Surface area: 12,5 m^{2}
- Aspect ratio: 12,9
- Sweep (at 25% of the chord): 20°
- Recommended pilot weight: 55 – 100 kg
- V_{ne} (Never Exceed Speed): 120 km/h
- V_{ra} (Maximum Rough Air Speed): 100 km/h
- V_{fe} (Maximum speed with flaps set to 20° or more): 80 km/h
- V_{a} (Manœuvre Speed): 85 km/h
- V_{s} (Stall Speed):
  - flap sets to 0° at maximum take-off weight: 37 km/h
  - flap sets to 20° at maximum take-off weight: 32 km/h
- Best Glide: 27: 1 @ 70 km/h
- Minimum Sink: 0,6 m/s @ 43 km/h
- Load Factor: + 5,3 g/- 2,65 g (with 1.5 safety coefficient).

== Specifications (Swift) ==
Data from

General characteristics

- Crew: 1
- Wingspan: 42 ft 0 in (12.80 m)
- Wing area: 136 sq ft (12.6 m^{2})
- Aspect ratio: 13:1
- Empty weight: 106 lb (48 kg)

Performance

- Rate of sink: 200 ft/min (1.0 m/s) in a 100 ft (30 m) radius turn
- Minimum sink rate: 118 ft/min (0.6 m/s)
- Lift-to-drag: 20:1 (maximum) 15:1 at 60 kn (111 km/h)

Aircraft of comparable role, configuration, and era

- Hall Vector 1
- Maupin Carbon Dragon
- Mitchell U-2 Superwing
- Rensselaer RP-1
