= Microlift glider =

Class of gliders

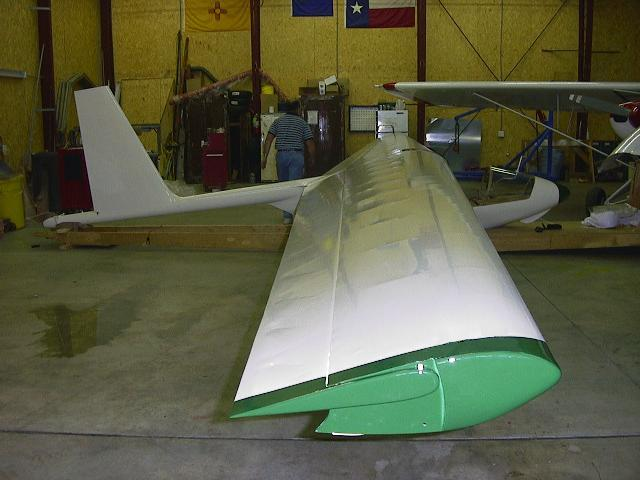
The Arndt Magic Dragon microlift glider at Harris Hill, N.Y. The Magic Dragon is a development of the Carbon Dragon design.

A microlift glider is a recreational glider that is able to exploit microlift, which is lift weaker than a conventional glider would require to stay airborne.

== Classification ==
The Fédération Aéronautique Internationale Gliding Commission's Sporting Code defines the classes for gliding competitions and records. One of the classes is the ultralight glider. These are defined as gliders with a take-off mass not exceeding 220 kg (486 lb). Examples of these are the Apis and Silent 2. Microlift gliders are a sub-type of the ultralight class, further defined by a wing loading that does not exceed 18 kg/m^{2} (3.69 lb/ft^{2}).These definitions were adopted for inclusion in the Sporting Code, Section 3, Gliding, effective on October 1, 2004.

World records for the ultralight class have been recognized by the FAI but there are no World Championships for these types at present. For world records microlift gliders are classed with the other ultralight gliders and/or hang gliders.

The FAI has produced a loaded weight versus wing loading diagram defining the different domains for glider classes.

== Characteristics ==
In addition to the traditional forms of lift used in the sport of gliding, microlift gliding also aims to exploit non-traditional sources of weak lift. In typical conditions, conventional sailplanes may be unable to exploit weak vertical movements of air. However a microlift glider that is specifically designed to have a very low rate of sink and a very small circling radius, may be able to exploit these feeble air movements for sustained flight and may even allow the glider to climb.

== Microlift gliders ==
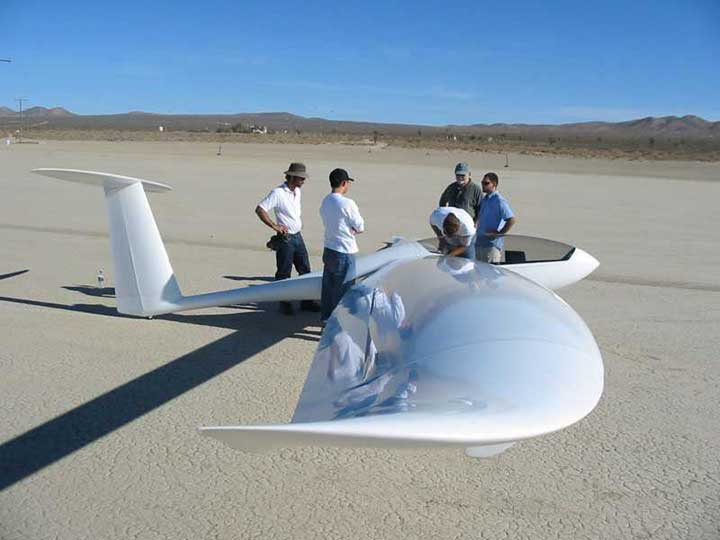
The Glidersport LightHawk, with its complex wing design.

- Advanced Aeromarine Sierra
- Aériane Swift
- Bailey-Moyes Tempest
- EEL ULF 1
- Glidersport LightHawk
- Maupin Carbon Dragon
- Ruppert Archaeopteryx
- Neutrino
- 1comet
