= Empire State Aerosciences Museum =

Coordinates: 42.8606°N 73.9320°W

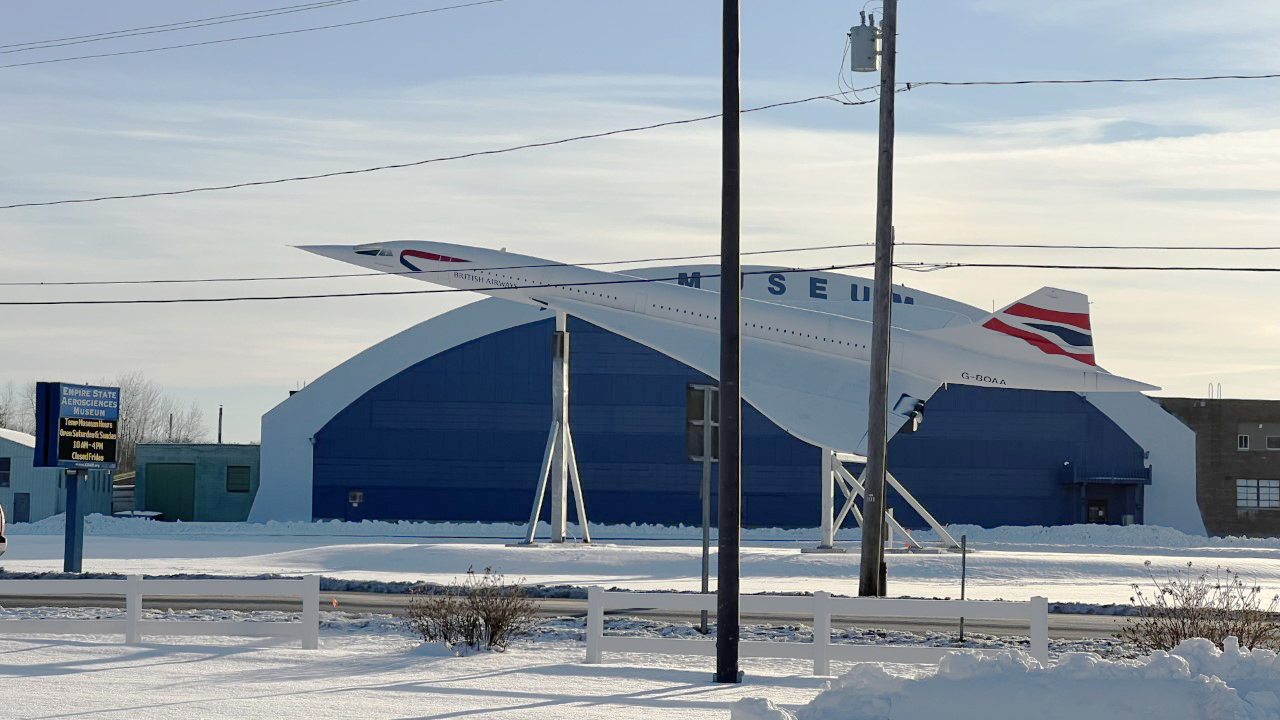
- Established: 1984
- Location: 250 Rudy Chase Drive; Glenville, New York, 12302; United States
- Type: Aerospace museum
- Founders: Carl Battaglia; James Delmonaco; Steven Israel; Ernie Tetrault
- Website: esam.org

The Empire State Aerosciences Museum (commonly referred to as ESAM) is a non-profit museum which strives to "educate, entertain and excite with experiences in air and space". Established in 1984 and chartered by the New York State Department of Education, the museum is located on 27 acres (110,000 m^{2}) of land on the western perimeter of the Schenectady County Airport in Glenville, New York, United States.

ESAM sponsors an annual air show at the Schenectady Airport.

== History ==
The museum is located on the site of the former General Electric Flight Test Center.

The museum celebrated its fortieth anniversary in July 2024. It received an F-15C the following month.

The museum's president, Dan Wilson, was killed in an airplane crash in late July 2025.

== Exhibits ==
The museum has a collection of military aircraft outside the main building, in the Agneta Airpark including:

- Bell UH-1 Iroquois
- Convair F-102A Delta Dagger
- Douglas A-4F Skyhawk II
- Douglas F3D Skyknight (Transferred from Intrepid Sea, Air & Space Museum)
- Fairchild Republic A-10 Thunderbolt II
- Grumman A-6E Intruder
- Grumman F-14A Tomcat
- Grumman S-2 Tracker (arrived in 2009)
- LTV A-7E Corsair II
- McDonnell-Douglas F-4D Phantom II
- McDonnell F-101F Voodoo
- Mikoyan-Gurevich MiG-15 (USSR) (Transferred from Intrepid Sea, Air & Space Museum)
- Mikoyan-Gurevich MiG-17F (USSR)
- Mikoyan-Gurevich MiG-21 (USSR)
- North American RA-5C Vigilante
- North American T-2C Buckeye
- Northrop F-5E Tiger II (used as a "MiG-28" in Top Gun)
- Republic F-84F Thunderstreak
- Republic F-105G Thunderchief ("Wild Weasel" variant)
- Supermarine Scimitar (Transferred from Intrepid Sea, Air & Space Museum)

ESAM's two galleries contain more fragile aircraft, detailed models, artifacts, memorabilia and photographs. Other exhibits include the Amelia Earhart Exhibit, the DePischoff "flying motorcycle", and a 32' scale model of the Japanese World War II aircraft carrier Akagi, used in the film Tora! Tora! Tora! A 102 feet long scale replica of a British Airways Concorde (G-BOAA) that was once on located in Times Square is on display at the museum in its front lawn, having been acquired in 2017. There are also several interactive displays. In addition, the museum houses the Wallace Holbrook Restoration Center which treats aircraft in various stages of restoration. Examples on display indoors include:

- Aeronca 65LB Chief
- Fisher FP-303
- Folland Gnat F.1
- Hughes OH-6A Cayuse
- Mooney M-18LA Mite
- Peterson J-4 Javelin
- Rand Robinson KR-2
- Rensselaer RP-1
- Stits SA-7D Sky-Coupe

== Research Library ==
The primary mission of the Janz Vander Veer Research Center/Library is to support the museum's education, exhibit and restoration programs. In addition, it serves as a resource to the general public for historical and technical aeroscience related information, such as a student with a term paper assignment, a model builder, a media reporter or an author doing research.

The library contents are made up of a broad collection of books, brochures, photographs, technical manuals, periodicals, scrapbooks, artwork and audiovisual items. Its content is particularly strong in the Pioneer, World War I, "Golden Era" and World War II periods (1910–1950).

The Attil Pasquini Collection has over 2,100 photographs that can be searched using a PastPerfect software database. The Frank Coffyn Collection is a gift from the estate of Kingsland Adams Coffyn by the Green family to the Empire State Aerosciences Museum. The collection contains about 200 photos of Wright Flyers aircraft taken by Coffyn who worked for the Wright Brothers.

The Rick Allen Collection has added many books and a large amount of research materials to the library catalog.

== Empire State Aviation Hall of Fame ==
The Empire State Aviation Hall of Fame, located on museum grounds, recognizes the contributions made by New York State aviation pioneers.

== See also ==
- North American aviation halls of fame
- List of aerospace museums
