= Bailey-Moyes Dragonfly =

Ultralight aircraft design

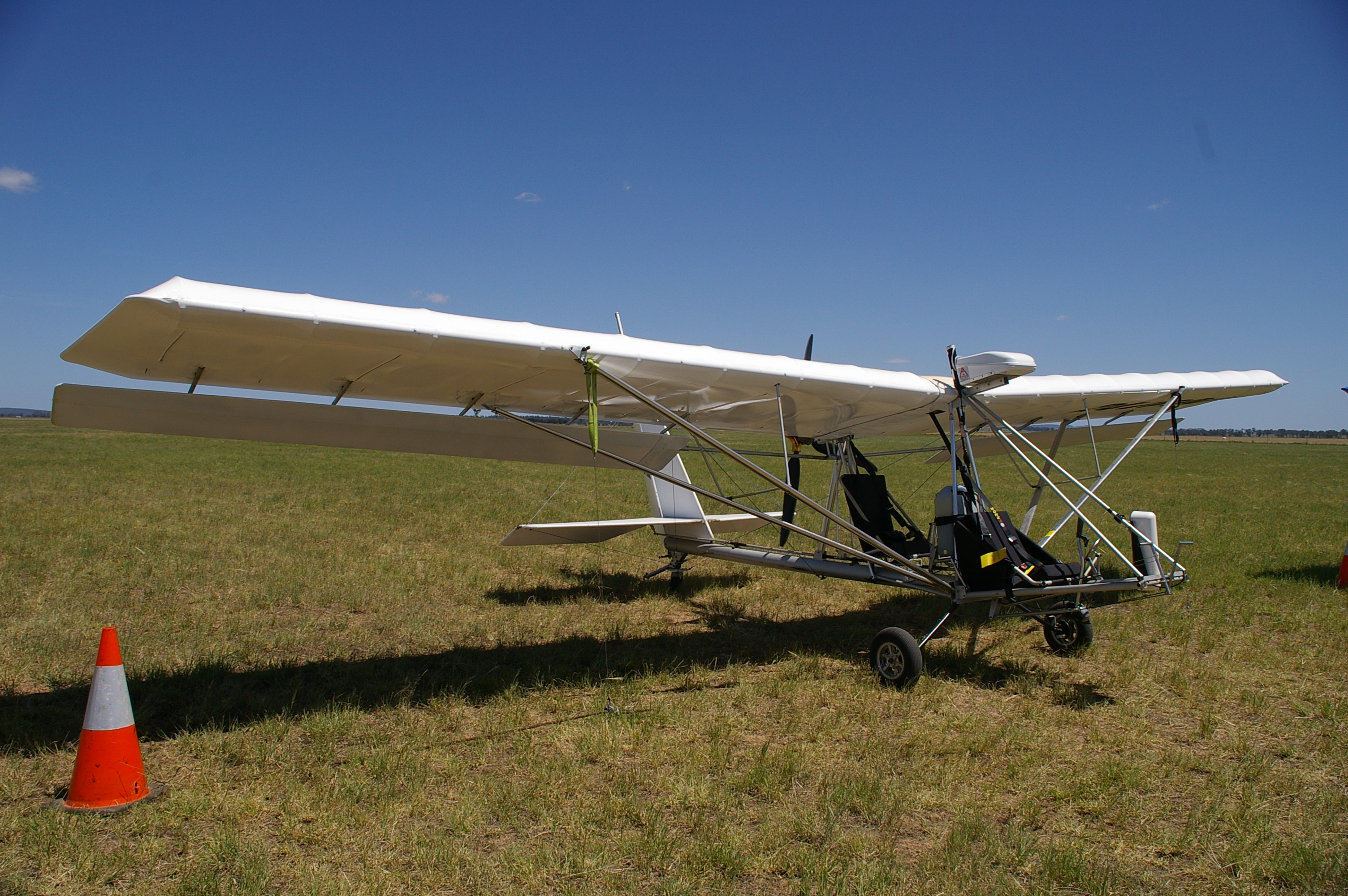
- Bailey-Moyes Dragonfly 'C' with the Rotax 582 powerplant

General information
- Type: Ultralight glider tug
- National origin: Australia/United States
- Manufacturer: Moyes Microlights; Bailey-Moyes Microlights; LiteFlite; Pitman Air
- Designer: Bob Bailey
- Status: In production
- Number built: more than 100 (2011)

History
- Introduction date: 1990

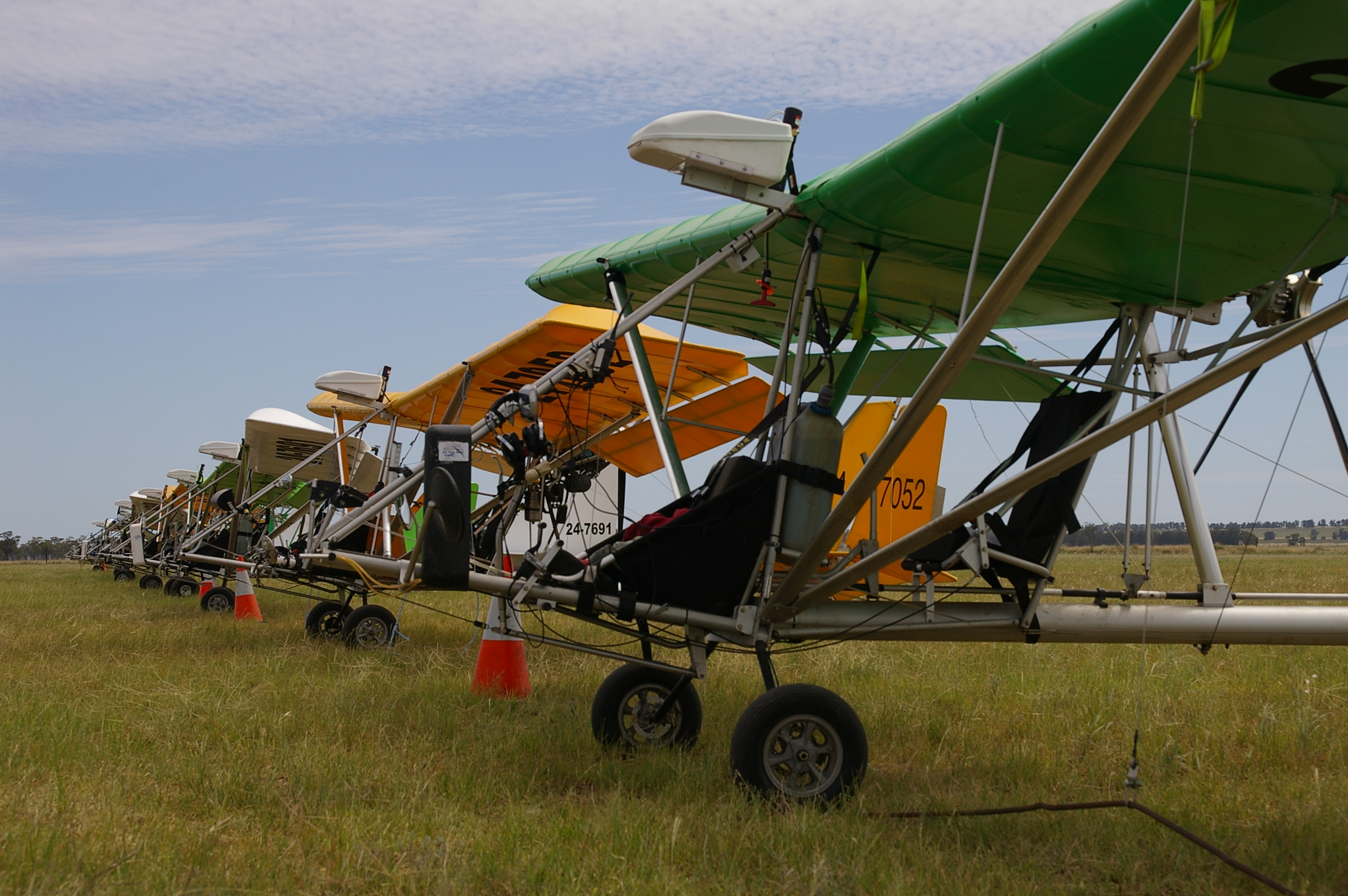
The Moyes fleet at Forbes, New South Wales, Australia

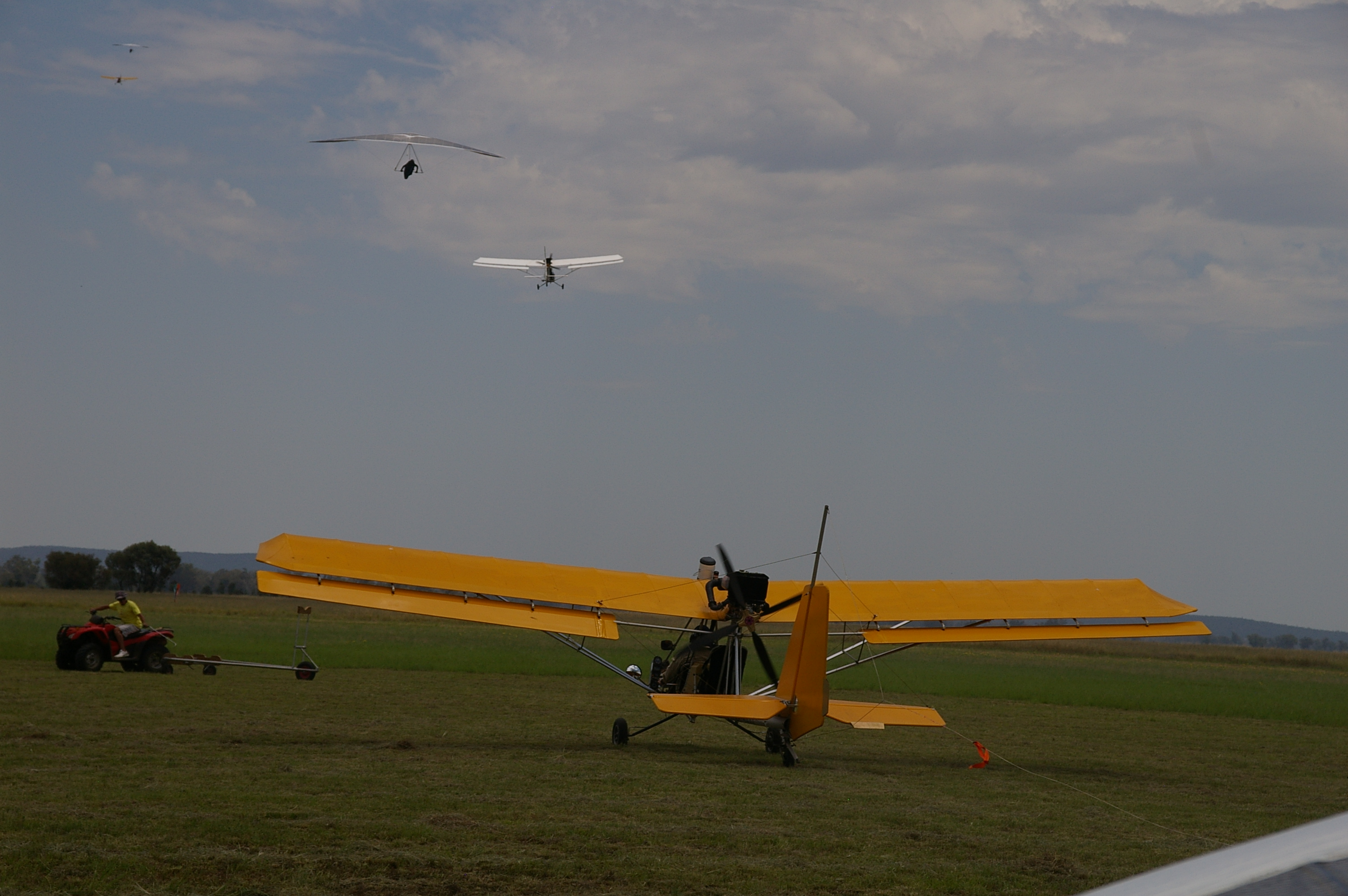
Dragonflies towing hang gliders at Forbes, New South Wales, Australia.

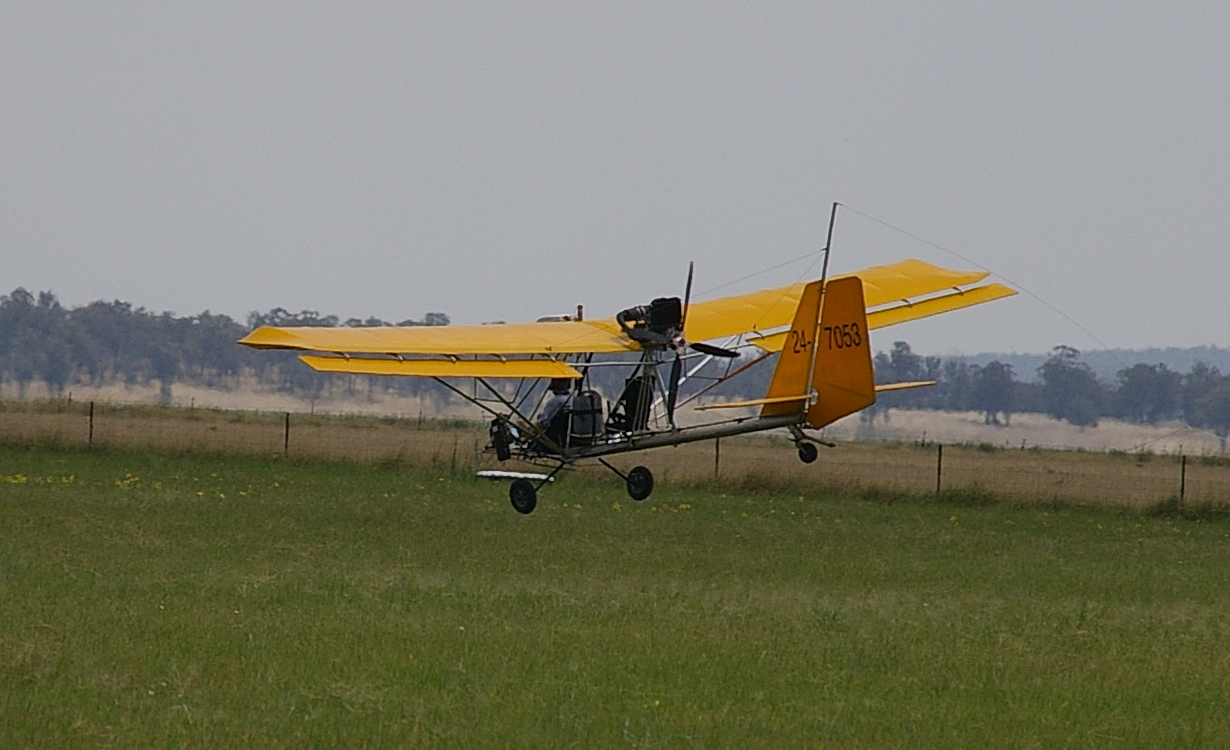
Dragonfly on landing approach

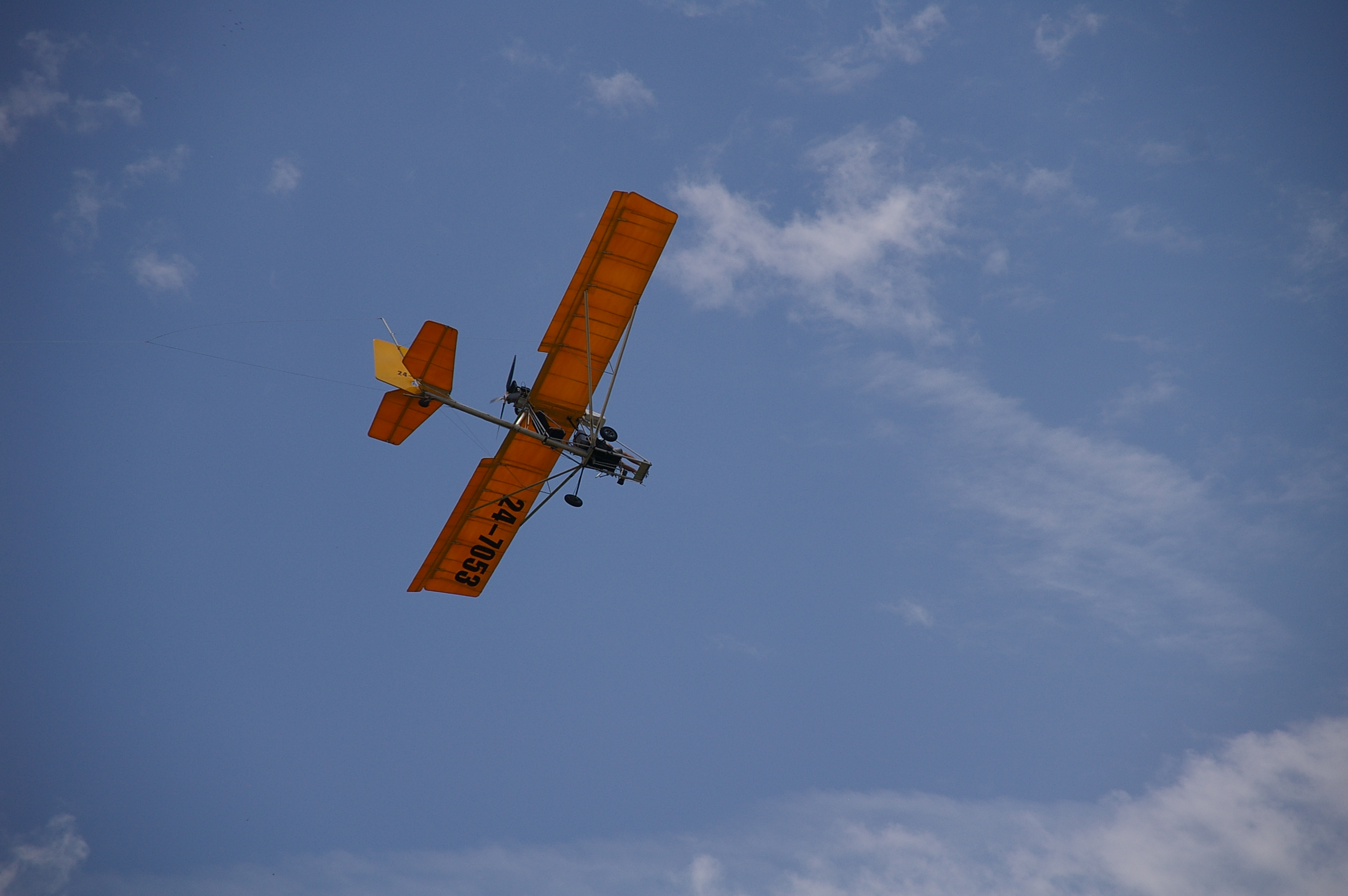
Dragonfly

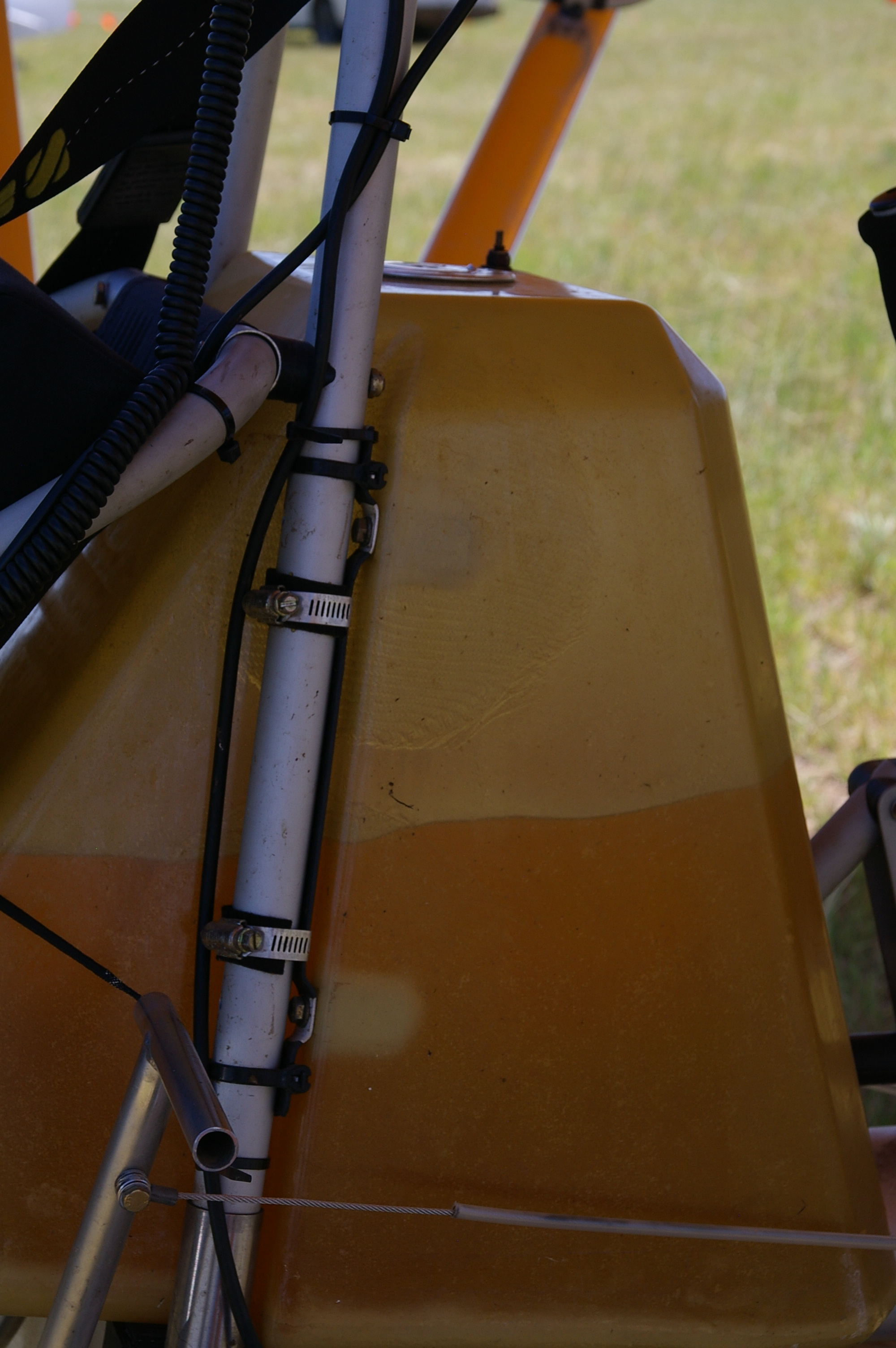
The Dragonfly's optional 50 Litre fuel tank gives 3 hours endurance

The Bailey-Moyes Dragonfly is an Australian-American two-seats-in-tandem, high-wing, strut-braced, open cockpit, conventional landing gear-equipped light-sport aircraft. The aircraft has been in production since 1990 and was designed as a special-purpose tug for hang gliders and ultralight sailplanes. It is available as a complete aircraft or as a kit for amateur construction. The aircraft has been variously produced by Moyes Microlights, Bailey-Moyes Microlights and currently LiteFlite of Botany, New South Wales, all different iterations of the same company.

== Design and development ==
The Dragonfly was developed in the late 1980s specifically as a hang glider tug for use in flatland areas where hang glider flying, which usually relies on hill launches, was not possible. This role requires an aircraft that can climb quickly at low speed. The Dragonfly achieves this goal, with a power-off stall speed of 17 kn (31 km/h) by using a large area wing of 170 square feet (16 m^{2}) in conjunction with Junkers-style flaperons. The takeoff distance required to clear a 49 ft (15 m) high obstacle is 492 ft (150 m) while flying solo and 984 ft (300 m) at maximum weight, on level short dry grass with no wind at 59 °F (15 °C). The aircraft has been successful as a hang glider tug and is also used for livestock mustering in its home country, as well as for recreational flying where STOL capabilities are required.

The aircraft is constructed of bolted 6061-T6 aluminium, with the two seats mounted on a fuselage boom tube that runs from the front rudder pedals to the tail. The landing gear consists of two main wheels on chrome molybdenum steel gear legs and axles, and a tail wheel configuration. The flexible steel axles work as shock absorbers during taxiing and landing. The tail wheel is steerable by means of the rudder pedals. The standard Rotax 582 engine is mounted in pusher configuration behind the wing's trailing edge. The engine's liquid-cooling allows fast descents while towing, without subjecting the engine cylinders to shock-cooling. The wing is supported by a V-strut and jury struts. The wing and tail surfaces are covered in pre-sewn Dacron envelopes. A unique feature is the extended rudder post, which is supported by steel cables from the wings and used as a tow attachment point. The aircraft is equipped with dual controls for pilot training and the rear seat is removable when not needed. The aircraft takes about 200 hours to assemble from the kit.

The design is a Federal Aviation Administration approved special light-sport aircraft, produced by Pitman Air of Red Bluff, California.

== Operational history ==
The Dragonfly has been exported to 12 countries, where it is primarily employed as a hang glider tug.

== Variants ==
Dragonfly
Original model powered by a 64 hp (48 kW) Rotax 582 two-stroke powerplant
Dragonfly C
Improved model powered by a standard 64 hp (48 kW) Rotax 582 two-stroke engine, with the 80 hp (60 kW) Rotax 912UL four-stroke powerplant optional. The BMW 1100S engine can also be used. It can accept engines in a range from 50 to 115 hp (37 to 86 kW).

== Aircraft on display ==
- Massey Air Museum, Massey, Maryland, United States

== Specifications (Dragonfly) ==
Data from Cliche and LiteFlite

General characteristics

- Crew: one
- Capacity: one passenger
- Length: 19 ft 6 in (5.94 m)
- Wingspan: 34 ft 0 in (10.36 m)
- Height: 7 ft 6 in (2.29 m)
- Wing area: 170 sq ft (16 m^{2})
- Empty weight: 514 lb (233 kg) (typical empty weight with Rotax 582 engine installed)
- Gross weight: 992 lb (450 kg)
- Fuel capacity: 6 U.S. gallons (23 L; 5.0 imp gal)
- Powerplant: 1 × Rotax 582 twin cylinder, two-stroke aircraft engine, 64 hp (48 kW)

Performance

- Cruise speed: 40 kn (46 mph, 74 km/h)
- Stall speed: 17 kn (20 mph, 31 km/h) at minimum weight, power off
- Never exceed speed: 63 kn (72 mph, 116 km/h)
- Range: 65 nmi (75 mi, 121 km) 20L tank, no wind
- Service ceiling: 16,000 ft (4,900 m)
- Rate of climb: 700 ft/min (3.6 m/s) at 32 mph (51 km/h), at maximum gross weight
- Rate of sink: 450 ft/min (2.3 m/s) at 35 mph (56 km/h), solo
- Lift-to-drag: 7:1

== See also ==
Aircraft of comparable role, configuration, and era

- Maxair Drifter
- Pterodactyl Ptug - another ultralight used for hang glider towing
