= Glidersport LightHawk =

American glider

LightHawk
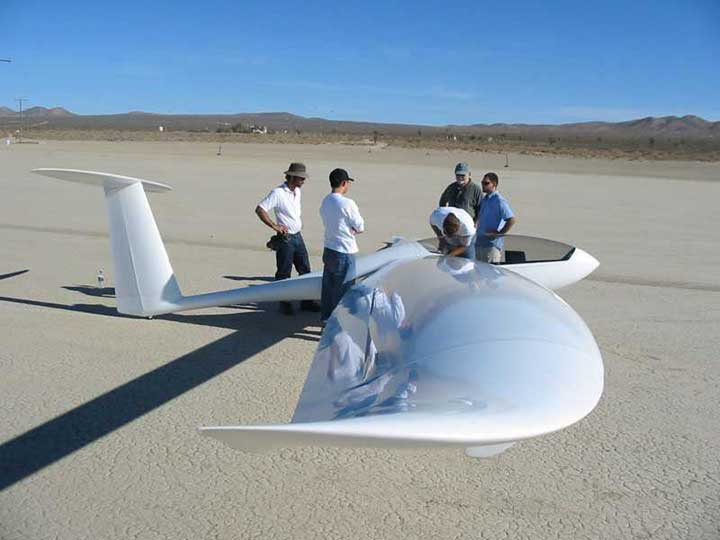

General information
- Type: Glider
- National origin: United States
- Manufacturer: Glidersport
- Status: undergoing certification

History
- First flight: 2002

The Glidersport LightHawk is an American mid-wing, T-tailed, single-seat, microlift glider under development by Glidersport.

== Design and development ==
The LightHawk is made from composites. Its 15 m (49.2 ft) span wing employs a large wing area of 12 m^{2} (130 sq ft) to produce a low wing loading to allow the aircraft to make use of small and light sources of lift. The construction gives a very low empty weight of just 68 kg (150 lb).

The aircraft first flew in 2002 and certification was initially forecast for 2011, and then for late 2012, but had not been completed as of December 2015.

== Specifications (LightHawk) ==
Data from Bayerl

General characteristics

- Crew: one
- Wingspan: 15 m (49 ft 3 in)
- Wing area: 12 m^{2} (130 sq ft)
- Empty weight: 68 kg (150 lb)
- Gross weight: 170 kg (375 lb)

Performance

- Maximum glide ratio: 35:1
- Rate of sink: 0.36 m/s (71 ft/min)
- Wing loading: 14.17 kg/m^{2} (2.90 lb/sq ft)

== See also ==
Related lists

- List of gliders
