= Maupin Carbon Dragon =

American ultralight sailplane

Carbon Dragon
- Carbon Dragon logo from the 1988 sales brochure

General information
- Type: Glider
- National origin: United States
- Designer: Jim Maupin
- Status: Plans no longer available
- Number built: At least four

History
- First flight: 1988

The Maupin Carbon Dragon is an American, high-wing, single-seat, glider that was designed by Jim Maupin and made available as plans for amateur construction. Plans are no longer available.

== Design and development ==
The Carbon Dragon was intended to take advantage of the US FAR 103 Ultralight Vehicles regulations that classify unpowered aircraft with empty weights of 155 lb (70 kg) or less as hang gliders and thus allow them to be flown without a pilot license, Federal Aviation Administration aircraft registration or a Certificate of Airworthiness. The Carbon Dragon's standard empty weight is 145 lb (66 kg) and the aircraft has a gross weight of 335 lb (152 kg), giving a payload of 190 lb (86 kg). The designer said "The philosophy behind its development was to try to bring foot launch soaring performance up into the lower performance range of sailplanes." The Carbon Dragon was intended to be similar in concept to the Hall Vector 1.

The original design was intended to be a much more complex aircraft, as Maupin explained:

As originally envisioned, it would have 40 ft span, and a sailcloth flap that would roll up on a roller inside the wing, changing the area from 100 to 140 square feet and back again. As calculations and drawings progressed, it got more and more complicated: chain drive to turn the roller; 1000 lb. pull to get the flap out; required five pullies: and double cables behind the wing and in the slip stream, etc., etc., not to mention the aileron problem. One evening over coffee in our motel room in Hemet, my friend, mentor, advisor, and consultant, Irv Culver, said, "Jim, you're going to build that, and then spend the springtime of your youth getting it all to work. And, it'll get heavier and more complex and ultimately the drag and weight of all that stuff will defeat the whole purpose. Why don't you throw all that out and put everything you save in weight and complexity into added span? If you like, I'll run the numbers for drag on all that hardware." When Irv offers to "run the numbers" to prove his point, it's time to get out gracefully.

As a result, the aircraft was redesigned to its final configuration, a simpler and lighter aircraft with a 44 ft (13.4 m) span wing.

The Carbon Dragon is predominantly a conventional wood and doped aircraft fabric glider, making judicious use of carbon fiber in the wing spar caps, control rods, flaperons and the elliptical tail boom to save weight. The control tubes are constructed by laying up the carbon fiber on aluminium tubing and then, when the carbon has cured, dissolving the aluminium with swimming pool acid. The cockpit is totally enclosed and the original design called for a cockpit width of 17 in (43 cm) at the hips and 25 in (64 cm) at the shoulder, although some have been modified to accommodate pilots of larger dimensions. The main aircraft structure consists of dual triangular torque boxes on each side of the fuselage. The wing employs a Culver SD airfoil that was designed by Irv Culver for the project and full-span flaperons of 30% chord. The flaperons can deploy from −5° to +15° as flaps and −4° to +16° as ailerons, with a 4:1 differential. The flaperons are driven by two, vertically mounted pushrods enclosed within the fuselage and connected to the side stick. The wing ribs forward of the spar are fabricated from 1/4 in (6 mm) 5-ply mahogany and aft of the spar from 5/16 in (8 mm) square spruce. The landing gear is a fixed monowheel, mounted on the hinged cockpit bottom door, that opens to allow the pilot to lift the aircraft for foot-launching. The aircraft was designed so that if the pilot falls while foot-launching his body will be in the rear fuselage cavity and not pinned under the aircraft. The ultimate structural load limit is +/-7.5 g, with a +/-5.0 g operational load limit.

The Carbon Dragon was designed to be launched by foot-launch, aero-tow, winch-launch, auto-tow or bungee launch.

In October 1988 Maupin reported that the prototype had been flown by ten different pilots ranging in weight from 120 to 210 lb (54 to 95 kg), had achieved a 100 fpm (0.51 m/s) sink rate and had been launched by auto-tow, aero-tow and bungee, but had not been foot-launched. In October 1988 Maupin estimated that building a Carbon Dragon would cost US$2000 and take 1000–1500 hours of construction time.

When they were available the plans consisted of 23 sheets of 2' X 4' (61 X 122 cm) blueprints and sold for US$150.

At least one Carbon Dragon was modified to include a cockpit roof-mounted pentagonal spoiler, similar to that used on the Maupin Windrose.

== Operational history ==
Many of the early test flights were done near Tehachapi, California by auto-tow using a 2,000 ft (610 m) rope and these included several 45-minute soaring flights in evening convergent lift. The designer conducted many of the prototype flights himself and said of flying the aircraft, "It's great fun to fly, everything happens so slowly".

In October 1988 Maupin stated that 70 sets of plans had been sold.

In the 1994 Kansas Kowbell Klassic, a scheduled, non-handicapped cross-country distance contest, Gary Osoba flew a Carbon Dragon to win with a distance of 180 mi (290 km). In July 1995 Gary Osoba flew a Carbon Dragon to a US National and World Record in the Ultralight Category for Distance up to Three Turnpoints for a flight of 237.440 mi (382 km). In September 1995, Osoba set US National and World Records in the Ultralight Category for 100 km (62 mi) Triangle Speed, Triangle Distance, and Out & Return Distance of 24.48 mph (39 km/h), 133.02 mi (214 km), and 115.52 mi (186 km) respectively.

Qualifying as a FAR Part 103 hang glider, the Carbon Dragon does not require FAA registration and thus an accurate number of the total completed is not available, but the Soaring Directory reports four have been flown.

== Variants ==
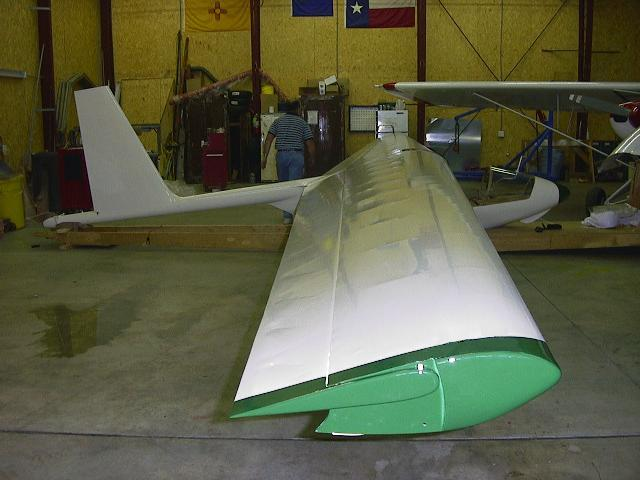
The Arndt Magic Dragon under construction

Carbon Dragon
Initial version
Magic Dragon
Improved version developed by Steve Arndt

== Specifications (Carbon Dragon) ==
Data from Sailplane Directory and Jim Maupin

General characteristics

- Crew: One
- Length: 20 ft 0 in (6.1 m)
- Wingspan: 44 ft 0 in (13.41 m)
- Wing area: 153.34 sq ft (14.246 m^{2})
- Aspect ratio: 12.62:1
- Airfoil: Culver SD
- Empty weight: 145 lb (66 kg)
- Gross weight: 335 lb (152 kg)

Performance

- Stall speed: 22 mph (35 km/h, 19 kn)
- g limits: +/-7.5 g ultimate, +/-5.0 g load limit
- Maximum glide ratio: 25:1 at 35 mph (56 km/h)
- Rate of sink: 100 ft/min (0.51 m/s)
- Wing loading: 2.18 lb/sq ft (10.6 kg/m^{2})

== See also ==
- Microlift glider

Aircraft of comparable role, configuration, and era

- Advanced Aeromarine Sierra
- Hall Vector 1
- Rensselaer RP-1
- Ruppert Archaeopteryx

Related lists

- List of gliders
