= Bailey-Moyes Tempest =

Tempest

General information
- Type: Glider
- National origin: Australia and the United States
- Manufacturer: Moyes Microlights
- Designer: Bob Bailey
- Status: Production completed
- Number built: 12 (2001)

History
- Developed from: Advanced Aeromarine Sierra

The Bailey-Moyes Tempest, is an Australian-American high-wing, strut-braced, single-seat, microlift glider that was designed by Bob Bailey of Florida, United States and produced by Moyes Microlights of Waverley, New South Wales, Australia.

== Design and development ==
The Tempest is a development of the Advanced Aeromarine Sierra and was designed to be towed aloft behind an ultralight aircraft.

The aircraft's 42 ft (12.8 m) span wing is made from aluminium tubing covered in Dacron and is supported by a single lift strut on each side, plus a jury strut. The fuselage is made from fiberglass and features a canopy that is hinged on one side for cockpit access. The cockpit is 22 in (56 cm) wide. The landing gear is either a monowheel gear or, optionally, bicycle gear.

Although very light, with a standard empty weight of 200 lb (91 kg), the Tempest does not qualify under the US FAR 103 Ultralight Vehicles regulations as a hang glider, neither is it foot-launchable. When it was available the aircraft was supplied as a kit, that required an estimated 200 hours to complete, or as a complete ready-to-fly aircraft. In 1998 the kit was US$10,000 and the complete aircraft was US$12,500. Twelve were reported as flying by the end of 2001.

== Aircraft on display ==
- Massey Air Museum, Massey, Maryland, United States

== Specifications (Tempest) ==
Data from Purdy, Bertrand and KitPlanes

General characteristics

- Crew: one
- Length: 20 ft (6.1 m)
- Wingspan: 42 ft (13 m)
- Height: 5 ft (1.5 m)
- Wing area: 150 sq ft (14 m^{2})
- Aspect ratio: 12:1
- Empty weight: 200 lb (91 kg)
- Gross weight: 400 lb (181 kg)

Performance

- Maximum speed: 90 mph (140 km/h, 78 kn)
- Stall speed: 27 mph (43 km/h, 23 kn)
- Maximum glide ratio: 23:1 at 37 mph (60 km/h)
- Rate of sink: 170 ft/min (0.86 m/s) at 25 mph (40 km/h)
- Wing loading: 2.67 lb/sq ft (13.0 kg/m^{2})

== See also ==
Related lists

- List of gliders
