= Massey Air Museum =

Aviation museum

- Established: 2001
- Location: 33541 Maryland Line Rd. Massey, Maryland 21650
- Coordinates: 39.3026°N 75.8011°W
- Website: masseyaero.org

Massey Air Museum at Massey Aerodrome is an aviation museum near Massey, Maryland, United States.

The museum is a non-profit organization with exhibits on tail wheel aircraft and information about the aviation heritage of Maryland and Delaware.

== History ==
The museum collection includes a static Douglas DC-3, 23 flying airplanes, 11 gliders, a rotating beacon tower, a working windmill with cypress wood tank inside the tower and an EAA chapter.

== Aircraft based at Massey Aerodrome ==
Flying aircraft based at Massey Aerodome (community hangars & tie-downs), as of December 2019:

- 1947 Aeronca 7CCM (L-16)
- 1992 Bailey-Moyes Dragonfly
- 1975 Bellanca 7ECA Citabria
- 1941 Boeing Stearman B75N1 PT-17, "U.S ARMY 747" (engine: 450 hp P&W R-985)
- 1944 Boeing Stearman E75N1 (engine: 225 hp Lycoming R680) “VN2S-5”
- 1957 Cessna 172
- 1991 Pietenpol Aircamper BJ-1 (29’ Clip Winged Piper wings)
- 1967 Piper Cherokee Cruiser PA-28-140
- 1939 Piper Cub J3C
- 1960 Piper PA-25 Pawnee
- 1957 Piper Tri-Pacer PA-22-150
- 1943 Stinson/Vultee V-77 (“Gull Wing” Reliant)
- 1990 Wolf W-11 Boredom Fighter

Flying aircraft based in Massey Aerodome T hangars:

- 1967 Cessna 150H
- 1981 Cessna 172P
- 1960 Cessna 182D
- 1963 Cessna 182G (Massey Air Museum glider tow plane)
- 1940 Piper Clip Wing Cub J3C-65 (engine: Lycoming 0-145B)
- 1946 Piper Cub J-3C-65
- 1950 Piper Pacer PA-20 (engine: 125 hp Lycoming O-290-D)
- 1936 Hammond 100 biplane (s/n 204) (engine: Kinner 100 hp)
- 2011 Searey (rotax engine)
- 1939 WACO ZKS-7 (engine: Lycoming R680 conversion)

Gliders:

- Bailey-Moyes Tempest Microlight glider, single place, glide ratio: 23:1 at 37 mph
- (Trailer) 1965 SCHLEICHER K-10 A (#10009) glider, glide ratio: best, 32:1
- 1952 SCHWEIZER SGS 1-23 (#102) glider, Sgl. place, glide ratio: 30.8:1 at 50 mph
- 1975 SCHWEIZER SGS 1-35 (#24) glider, Sgl. place, glide ratio: 38:1 at 55 mph
- 1968 SCHWEIZER SGS 1-26B (#393) glider, Sgl. place, glide ratio: 23:1@ 53 mph
- 1963 SCHWEIZER SGS 1-26B (#192) glider, Sgl. place, glide ratio: 23:1@ 53 mph
- 1955 SCHWEIZER SGU 2-22 (#39) glider, 2 place, glide ratio: 17:1@ 47 mph
- (trailer) 1972 SCHWEIZER SGS 2-33A (#231) glider, 2 place, glide ratio: 22.25:1

Motor gliders:

- (trailer) 2000 Aviastroitel AC-5M self-launching motor-glider, 25 hp, Russia
- (trailer) 2005 TeST TST-10 Atlas self-launching motor-glider, 40 hp Rotax 447, glide ratio: 40:1, Wingspan: 15.00 m (49 ft 3 in), Czech Republic
- (trailer) 2006 TST-14M Bonus motor-glider, 50 hp Rotax 503UL (Certif. 05/08/2019)

Non-flying aircraft:

- 1963 Piper Colt PA-22-108

Static outdoor museum display:

- N18111 1937 Douglas DC-3A (s/n #1983) United Airlines

Inside the museum:

- Replica 1911 Wright glider made by Jimmy Dayton
- N738 1946 Ercoupe 415-C, s/n 1788. Eng: 75 HP Cont. C85

Engines on display:

- 1710 hp, 14 cylinder, Wright R-2600 radial as used on the B-25 bomber and B-314 Boeing Clipper
- 160 hp, Kinner 5 cylinder radial engine
- 37 hp Continental A-40 4 cylinder flat head engine (single spark plug and ignition) 2550 rpm, wt. 144 lb (introduced on the 1931-1936 Taylor E-2 Cub)
- 65 hp Lycoming O-145-B2 4 cylinder horizontally opposed engine (overhead valves, dual ignition).2300 rpm, weight 165.5 lb (0.0751 t)o late 1940s)
- Cut-away engine - Spanish Elizalde Tigre IVB (150 hp) four-cylinder inverted air-cooled engine (ca. 1940s). Used in C.A.S.A. 1.131E (license-built Bücker 131 Jungmann)

Static museum display project in West Hangar:

- N42DL 1993 Lance Aero (Bellanca 14–13), experimental, amateur built (non-flying museum project)
