= Advanced Aeromarine Sierra =

American glider

Sierra

General information
- Type: Glider
- National origin: United States
- Manufacturer: Advanced Aeromarine
- Status: Production completed
- Number built: 1 (1998)

History
- First flight: March 1991
- Variant: Moyes Tempest

The Advanced Aeromarine Sierra was an American high-wing, strut-braced, single-seat, glider that was designed and produced by Advanced Aeromarine, as a kit for amateur construction.

== Design and development ==
The Sierra was intended as a lightweight and affordable glider with modest performance that could be launched by ultralight aircraft aerotow, auto-tow, winch-launch or bungee launch. It first flew in March 1991.

The aircraft was made from aluminium tube, fabric and composites. Its 42.65 ft (13.0 m) span wing was supported by a lift strut and jury struts. The glide ratio was 25:1 and had a landing roll of 150 ft (46 m). The landing gear was tandem wheels, plus a tail caster. The completion time from the factory kit was rated as 150 hours.

Although very light, with a standard empty weight of 205 lb (93 kg), the Sierra did not qualify under the US FAR 103 Ultralight Vehicles regulations as a hang glider, neither was it foot-launchable. Only one prototype had been reported as completed by December 1998.

== Operational history ==
In September 2011 there were no Sierras registered with the US Federal Aviation Administration and it is likely that none exist anymore.

== Variants ==
Sierra LS
Main production version

== Specifications (Sierra LS) ==
Data from Purdy and KitPlanes

General characteristics

- Crew: one
- Length: 21 ft 0 in (6.40 m)
- Wingspan: 42 ft 7.8 in (13.000 m)
- Wing area: 142 sq ft (13.2 m^{2})
- Aspect ratio: 13:1
- Empty weight: 205 lb (93 kg)
- Gross weight: 455 lb (206 kg)

Performance

- Stall speed: 27 mph (43 km/h, 23 kn)
- Maximum glide ratio: 25:1 at 40 mph (64 km/h)
- Wing loading: 3.2 lb/sq ft (16 kg/m^{2})

== See also ==
Related development

- Moyes Tempest

Aircraft of comparable role, configuration, and era

- Hall Vector 1
- Maupin Carbon Dragon

Related lists

- List of gliders
