= Rensselaer RP-1 =

American glider

RP-1
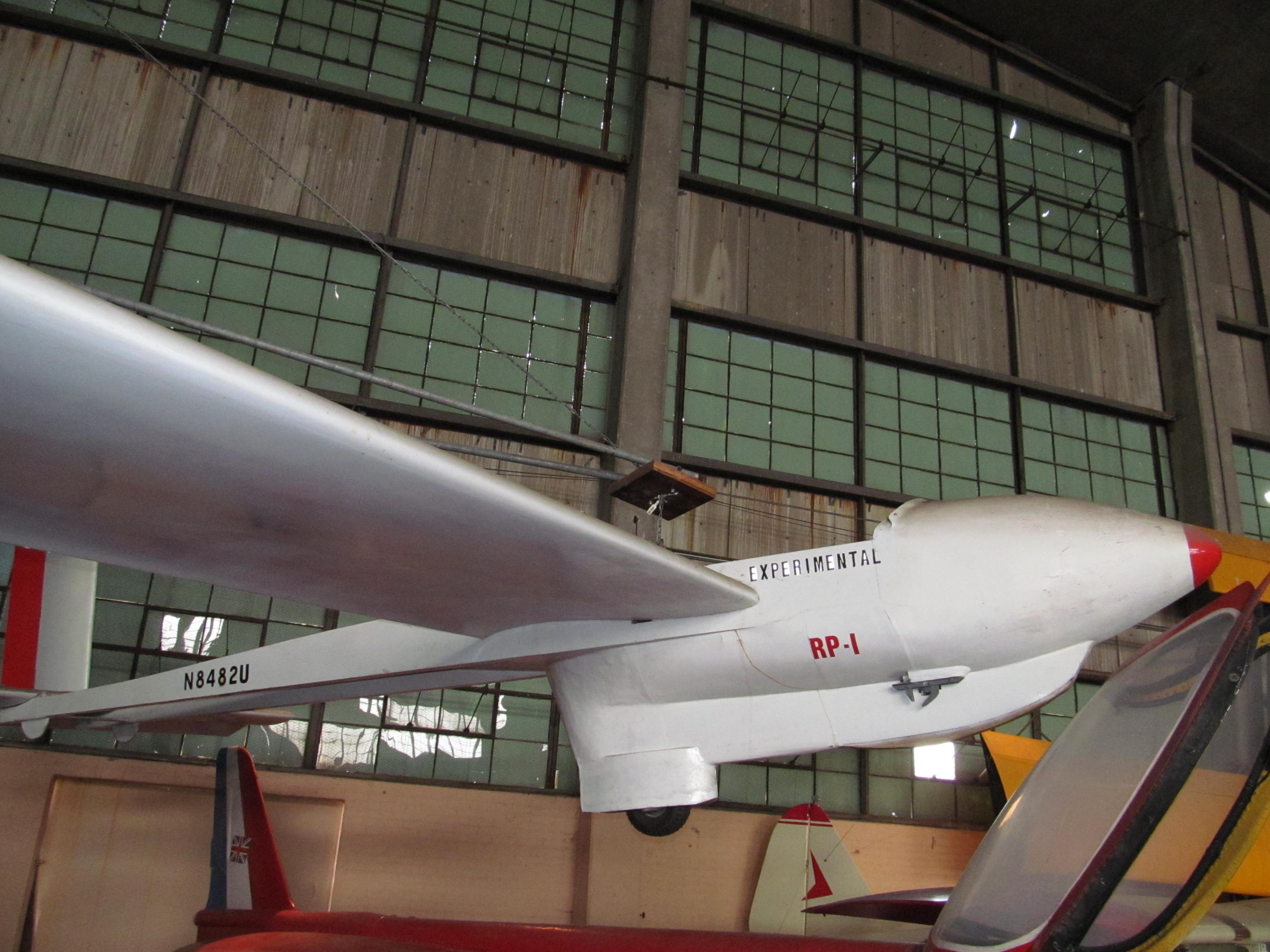

General information
- Type: Glider
- National origin: United States
- Manufacturer: Rensselaer Polytechnic Institute
- Status: Project completed
- Number built: one

History
- First flight: 1980

The Rensselaer RP-1 (for Rensselaer Polytechnic design 1) is an American low-wing, single-seat, foot-launchable prototype glider that was designed and built by the Rensselaer Polytechnic Institute of Troy, New York. It first flew in 1980.

== Design and development ==
The RP-1 was partly funded by NASA and was the first aircraft in Rensselaer's Composite Aircraft Program.

The aircraft is of mixed construction, made from composites, Kevlar and PVC foam. Its 37.5 ft (11.4 m) span wing employs a Wortmann FX-63-137 airfoil. The aircraft weighs just 116 lb (53 kg) and was intended to be foot-launched. The landing gear consists of a main skid and dual tail skids. The aircraft achieved a 20:1 glide ratio. Only one was completed; it has been preserved at the Empire State Aerosciences Museum in Schenectady, New York.

== Specifications (RP-1) ==
Data from Sailplane Directory

General characteristics

- Crew: one
- Wingspan: 37 ft 6 in (11.43 m)
- Wing area: 129 sq ft (12.0 m^{2})
- Aspect ratio: 11:1
- Airfoil: Wortmann FX-63-137
- Empty weight: 116 lb (53 kg)
- Gross weight: 265 lb (120 kg)

Performance

- Maximum glide ratio: 20:1 at 33 mph (53 km/h)
- Rate of sink: 120 ft/min (0.61 m/s)
- Wing loading: 2.05 lb/sq ft (10.0 kg/m^{2})

== See also ==
Aircraft of comparable role, configuration, and era

- Hall Vector 1
- Maupin Carbon Dragon
- Ruppert Archaeopteryx

Related lists

- List of gliders
