= Stan Hall =

English footballer

Personal information
- Full name: Stanley Arthur Hall
- Date of birth: 18 February 1917
- Place of birth: Southgate, England
- Date of death: September 1999 (aged 82)
- Place of death: Enfield, England
- Height: 5 ft 11 in (1.80 m)
- Position: Goalkeeper

Senior career*
Years	Team	Apps	(Gls)
- Tottenham Hotspur
- Wood Green
–1937	Finchley		
1937–1947	Leyton Orient	26	(0)
1947–1949	Yeovil Town	46	(0)
- * Club domestic league appearances and goals

Stanley Arthur Hall (18 February 1917 – September 1999) was an English professional footballer who played in the Football League for Leyton Orient as a goalkeeper.
