= Moyes Litespeed =

Litespeed

General information
- Type: Hang glider
- National origin: Australia
- Manufacturer: Moyes Delta Gliders
- Status: In production

The Moyes Litespeed is a series of Australian high-wing, single-place, hang gliders, designed and produced by Moyes Delta Gliders of Botany, New South Wales.

== Design and development ==
The Litespeed series was designed as a top-level competition class glider. The entire family of gliders are "topless" designs, lacking a kingpost and upper rigging. The company also builds a derivative aircraft with a kingpost, the Litesport.

The aircraft is made from aluminum tubing, with some models making extensive use of carbon fibre tubing. The wing is covered in Dacron sailcloth, with many models using Mylar reinforcing.

== Operational history ==
Litespeeds have placed highly in world and national competition since their introduction. For instance at the Australian Forbes Odyssey competition in 2001, Gerolf Heinrischs won flying a Litespeed, Litespeeds took the first four places and eight of the top ten. At the Flytec 2002 Championships Litespeeds captured ten of the top 25 spots.

At the 2003 World Hang Gliding Championships, held in Brasília, Brazil, six of the top ten pilots flew Litespeed gliders. The Ceara Hang Gliding Race and Rally was an invitational event held between 3–7 September 2003 and took competitors across the Brazilian state of Ceará. Five of the top six places went to Litespeed pilots, including first place, which went to American Curt Warren.

At the 2005 Flytec championships Litespeeds finished in five of the top ten places.

At the 16th FAI World Hang Gliding Championship held in August 2007 at Big Spring, Texas, USA, Litespeeds captured the first three places and captured 17 out of the top 25 places.

In the 2007 Rob Kells Memorial competition Litespeeds took second and third place as well as seven of the top 13 places.

The 2008 World Hang Gliding Champion, Elio Cataldi won flying a Litespeed RS 4, as did fourth-place finisher Filippo Oppicci. At the 2008 European Hang Gliding Championships held between 7–21 June the men's event was won by Elio Cataldi, with Tomas Weissenberger and Michael Friesenbichler second and third; the women's champion was Corinna Schwiegershausen, all of them flying the Litespeed RS 4. The 2008 World Women's and Rigid Hang Gliding championships held between 19 July – 2 August in Sigillo, Italy was won by Corinna Schwiegershausen of Germany flying a Litespeed. Second and third places were won by Francoise Dieuzeide of France and Britain's Kathleen Rigg, both also flying Lightspeeds. Also in 2008 Jonny Durand Jr won the Australian Gulgong Classic, flying a Litespeed RS. Second and third places went to Curt Warren and Blay Olmos, flying Litespeed models RS 4 and 3.5 respectively.

In Namibia on 16 December 2008, Jean Souviron set an unofficial world record for an out-and-return flight of 350 km (217 mi), between the Namib and Kalahari deserts, flying a Litespeed RS 4.

In the January 2009 Australian Corryong Cup competition Steve Crosby placed second flying a Litespeed 5. In the 2009 Bogong Cup, flown in nine days ending on 21 January all of the three winners, Curt Warren first, Jon Durand Jr second and Steve Blenkinsop in third place, were flying Litespeeds models. The Dalby Big Air 2009 competition, held in Queensland, Australia between 8–14 March, was won by Australian Curt Warren flying a Litespeed RS 4. Warren also completed a remarkable 338 km (210 mi) flight in the face of Cyclone Hamish as part of the competition. Giovanni Vitola won the 2009 Guatemalan Hang Gliding Nationals held in March, unusually at Roldanillo, Colombia, while flying a Litespeed. The 2009 Forbes Flatlands competition, held in New South Wales, Australia was won by Spanish pilot Blay Olmos, flying a Litespeed S. Second and third places went to Jon Durand Jr and Attila Bertok, both also flying Litespeed S models. In August 2009 Thomas Weissenberger placed second in the Slovenian Open Hang Gliding Championship flying a Litespeed.

At the 2010 Forbes Flatlands competition, Australian Jonny Durand placed first flying a Litespeed RS 3.5. Nine of the top ten places went to pilots flying Litespeeds. The top three winners of the 2010 Mexican Hang gliding Championships, held between 16–24 April at San Marcos, Jalisco and Tapalpa, Mexico, were Rodrigo de Obeso, Rodrigo Russek and Erick Salgado, all flying Litespeed RS 4s.

On 3 July 2010 Tom Weissenberger completed a new European hang gliding record of 345 km (214 mi), flying a Litespeed RS 3.5.

Rodrigo de Obeso came in second in the 2011 Panamerican Hang Gliding Championships held in Tapalpa, Mexico, flying a Litespeed RD. At the 2011 Montegrappa Meet in Italy, German pilot Corinna Schwiegershausen won the Women's category flying a Litespeed 3.5S.

In reviewing the Litespeed RX 3 in January 2012, world level competition woman pilot Evgeniya Laritskaya concluded "In comparing the RX3 with the S3 (keeping in mind my 50 kilos weight), I think that the S3 is more conservative and forgiving, while the RX3 is faster and more dynamic, more like a racing machine. And that I like a lot."

== Variants ==
Litespeed 3
Small sized model for lighter pilots. Its 9.6 m (31.5 ft) span wing has a nose angle of 132°, a wing area of 12.6 m^{2} (136 sq ft) and an aspect ratio of 7.2:1. Pilot hook-in weight range is 55 to 95 kg (121 to 209 lb).
Litespeed 4
Medium sized model for mid-weight pilots. Its 10.0 m (32.8 ft) span wing has a nose angle of 132°, a wing area of 13.5 m^{2} (145 sq ft) and an aspect ratio of 7.4:1. Pilot hook-in weight range is 59 to 110 kg (130 to 243 lb). Certified as DHV Class 3 and HGMA.
Litespeed 5
Large sized model for heavier pilots. Its 10.4 m (34.1 ft) span wing has a nose angle of 132°, a wing area of 14.5 m^{2} (156 sq ft) and an aspect ratio of 7.5:1. Pilot hook-in weight range is 68 to 120 kg (150 to 265 lb). Certified as DHV Class 3 and HGMA.
Litespeed RS 3.5
Small sized model, redesigned by Gerolf Heinrichs to incorporate a higher aspect ratio wing for improved gliding performance at the cost of maneuvering performance. Its 10.3 m (33.8 ft) span wing has a nose angle of 130–132°, a wing area of 13.7 m^{2} (147 sq ft) and an aspect ratio of 7.7:1. Pilot hook-in weight range is 68 to 109 kg (150 to 240 lb) and best glide ratio is 15:1.
Litespeed RS 4
Large sized model, redesigned by Gerolf Heinrichs to incorporate a higher aspect ratio wing for improved gliding performance at the cost of maneuvering performance. Its 10.4 m (34.1 ft) span wing has a nose angle of 130–132°, a wing area of 14.1 m^{2} (152 sq ft) and an aspect ratio of 7.7:1. Pilot hook-in weight range is 68 to 109 kg (150 to 240 lb) and best glide ratio is 15:1.
Litespeed S 3
Extra-small sized model for lighter pilots. Its 9.7 m (31.8 ft) span wing has a nose angle of 130–132°, a wing area of 12.9 m^{2} (139 sq ft) and an aspect ratio of 7.3:1. Pilot hook-in weight range is 60 to 80 kg (132 to 176 lb) and best glide ratio is 15:1.
Litespeed S 3.5
Small sized model for lighter pilots. Its 10.0 m (32.8 ft) span wing has a nose angle of 130–132°, a wing area of 13.6 m^{2} (146 sq ft) and an aspect ratio is 7.5:1. Pilot hook-in weight range is 68 to 109 kg (150 to 240 lb) and best glide ratio is 15:1.
Litespeed S 4
Medium sized model for mid-weight pilots. Its 10 m (32.8 ft) span wing has a nose angle of 130–132°, a wing area of 14 m^{2} (150 sq ft) and an aspect ratio is 7.3:1. Pilot hook-in weight range is 68 to 109 kg (150 to 240 lb) and best glide ratio is 15:1.
Litespeed S 4.5
Large sized model for heavier pilots. Its 10.4 m (34.1 ft) span wing has a nose angle of 130–132°, a wing area of 14.4 m^{2} (155 sq ft) and an aspect ratio is 7.6:1. Pilot hook-in weight range is 75 to 120 kg (165 to 265 lb) and best glide ratio is 15:1.
Litespeed S 5
Extra-large sized model for heavier pilots. Its 10.4 m (34.1 ft) span wing has a nose angle of 130–132°, a wing area of 14.8 m^{2} (159 sq ft) and an aspect ratio is 7.4:1. Pilot hook-in weight range is 75 to 120 kg (165 to 265 lb) and best glide ratio is 15:1.

== Specifications (S 4) ==
Data from Moyes

General characteristics

- Crew: one
- Wingspan: 10.0 m (32 ft 10 in)
- Wing area: 14.0 m^{2} (151 sq ft)
- Aspect ratio: 7.3:1
- Empty weight: 33.6 kg (74 lb)
- Gross weight: 142.6 kg (314 lb)

Performance

- Cruise speed: 34 km/h (21 mph, 18 kn)
- Stall speed: 26 km/h (16 mph, 14 kn)
- Never exceed speed: 85 km/h (53 mph, 46 kn)
- Maximum glide ratio: 15:1 at 45 km/h (28 mph)
- Wing loading: 10.2 kg/m^{2} (2.1 lb/sq ft)
