= List of World War I Entente aircraft =

This is a list of World War I Entente aircraft organized by country of origin. Dates are of first flight.

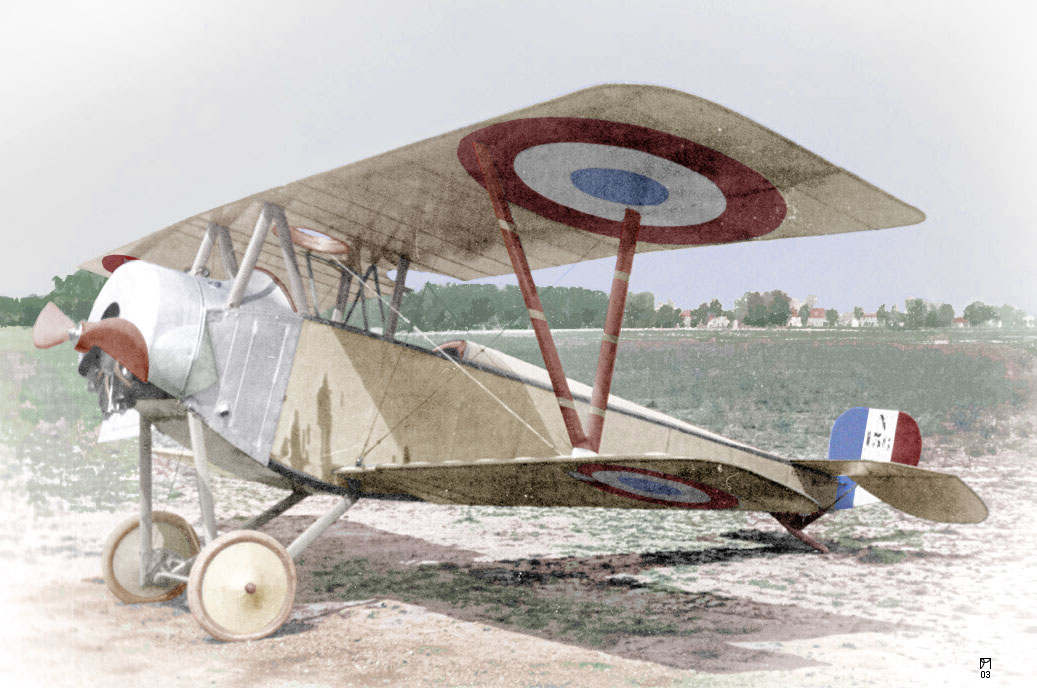
Nieuport 10, used by most Entente countries as fighter, reconnaissance aircraft and trainer.

== Canada ==
Aircraft	Origin	Role(s)	1st flight	Refs
Curtiss C-1 Canada	Canada	bomber	1915	
Curtiss JN-4 (Canadian)	Canada	trainer	1917	

== France ==
Aircraft	Origin	Role(s)	1st flight	Refs
Astoux-Vedrines triplane	France	experimental	1916	
Astra-Torres airship	France	patrol blimp	1908	
Astra bomber	France	bomber	1916	
Audenis C2	France	fighter	1916	
B.A.J. IV	France	fighter	1918	
Béchereau SAB C.1	France	fighter	1918	
Bernard AB 1	France	bomber	1918	
Blériot XI	France	trainer	1909	
Blériot La Vache	France	reconnaissance	1912	
Blériot 67	France	bomber	1916	
Borel-Boccacio Type 3000	France	fighter	1918	
Borel hydro-monoplane	France	reconnaissance	1911	
Borel-Odier Bo-T	France	bomber	1916	
Breguet AG 4	France	reconnaissance	1913	
Breguet U2	France	reconnaissance	1913	
Breguet Bre.4/BUM/BLM/BAM	France	bomber	1914	
Breguet Bre.5/6/9/12	France	fighter/bomber	1915	
Bréguet XI Corsaire	France	bomber	1916	
Breguet 14	France	bomber	1917	
Breguet 16	France	night bomber	1918	
Breguet 17	France	fighter	1918	
Caudron Type J	France	reconnaissance	1914	
Caudron G.2	France	trainer	1913	
Caudron G.3	France	reconnaissance	1913	
Caudron G.4	France	bomber	1915	
Caudron G.5	France	reconnaissance	1915	
Caudron G.6	France	reconnaissance	1916	
Caudron C.21	France	night bomber	1917	
Caudron C.22	France	bomber	1917	
Caudron C.23	France	night bomber	1918	
Caudron O2	France	fighter	1917	
Caudron R.4	France	reconnaissance	1915	
Caudron R.11	France	reconnaissance	1916	
Caudron R.12	France	reconnaissance	1918	
Caudron R.14	France	reconnaissance	1918	
Courtois-Suffit Lescop CSL-1	France	fighter	1918	
De Bruyère C 1	France	fighter	1917	
Deperdussin TT	France	reconnaissance	1912	
Deperdussin Monocoque	France	reconnaissance	1912	
Descamps 27	France	fighter	1918	
Donnet-Denhaut flying boat	France	patrol seaplane	1915	
Dorand AR	France	reconnaissance	1917	
Dorand DO.1	France	reconnaissance	1914	
Dufaux C.1	France	fighter	1916	
Farman HF.20	France	reconnaissance	1913	
Farman HF.30	France	fighter	1916	
Farman MF.7	France	trainer	1913	
Farman MF.11	France	reconnaissance	1914	
Farman MF.12	France	reconnaissance	1914	
Farman F.31	France	fighter	1918	
Farman F.40	France	reconnaissance	1915	
Farman F.50	France	bomber	1918	
FBA Type A	France	patrol seaplane	1913	
FBA Type B	France	patrol seaplane	1914	
FBA Type C	France	patrol seaplane	1915	
FBA Type D	France	fighter	1916	
FBA Type H	France	patrol seaplane	1915	
FBA Type S	France	patrol seaplane	1917	
Georges Levy G.L.40	France	reconnaissance	1917	
Gourdou-Leseurre Type A	France	fighter	1918	
Hanriot HD.1	France	fighter	1916	
Hanriot HD.2	France	fighter	1916	
Hanriot HD.3	France	fighter	1918	
Letord Let.1	France	reconnaissance	1916	
Letord Let.7	France	bomber	1917	
Letord Let.9	France	night bomber	1918	
Morane-Saulnier G	France	trainer	1912	
Morane-Saulnier H	France	trainer	1913	
Morane-Saulnier I	France	fighter	1916	
Morane-Saulnier L	France	reconnaissance	1914	
Morane-Saulnier LA	France	reconnaissance	1914	
Morane-Saulnier BB	France	reconnaissance	1915	
Morane-Saulnier L	France	fighter	1914	
Morane-Saulnier N	France	fighter	1914	
Morane-Saulnier P	France	reconnaissance	1916	
Morane-Saulnier S	France	bomber	1915	
Morane-Saulnier T	France	reconnaissance	1916	
Morane-Saulnier TRK	France	bomber	1915	
Morane-Saulnier V	France	fighter	1916	
Morane-Saulnier AC	France	fighter	1916	
Morane-Saulnier AF & AFH	France	fighter	1917	
Morane-Saulnier AI	France	fighter	1917	
Morane-Saulnier AN	France	fighter	1918	
Nieuport II	France	trainer	1910	
Nieuport IVG & M	France	reconnaissance	1912	
Nieuport VIM & H	France	reconnaissance	1913	
Nieuport 10	France	fighter	1914	
Nieuport 11	France	fighter	1915	
Nieuport 12	France	reconnaissance	1915	
Nieuport 12bis	France	fighter	1916	
Nieuport 13	France	reconnaissance	1915	
Nieuport 14	France	reconnaissance	1916	
Nieuport 15	France	bomber	1916	
Nieuport 16	France	fighter	1916	
Nieuport 17, 21 and 23	France	fighter	1916	
Nieuport 20	France	reconnaissance	1916	
Nieuport 24 and 24bis	France	fighter	1917	
Nieuport 25	France	fighter	1917	
Nieuport 27	France	fighter	1917	
Nieuport 28	France	fighter	1917	
Nieuport Madon	France	fighter	1917	
Nieuport 29	France	fighter	1918	
Nieuport 31	France	fighter	1918	
Nieuport 80	France	trainer	1917	
Nieuport 81	France	trainer	1917	
Nieuport 82	France	trainer	1917	
Nieuport 83	France	trainer	1917	
Paul Schmitt P.S.3	France	trainer	1915	
Paul Schmitt P.S.7	France	bomber	1915	
Paul Schmitt P.S.10	France	bomber	1917	
Ponnier L.1	France	reconnaissance	1914	
Ponnier M.1	France	fighter	1915	
Ponnier P.2	France	fighter	1916	
R.E.P. Type L Parasol	France	reconnaissance	1914	
R.E.P. type N	France	reconnaissance	1912	
R.E.P. C.1	France	fighter	1918	
Salmson-Moineau S.M.1	France	reconnaissance	1916	
Salmson 2	France	reconnaissance	1917	
Salmson 3	France	fighter	1918	
Salmson 4	France	bomber	1918	
Salmson 5	France	reconnaissance	1917	
Salmson 7	France	reconnaissance	1918	
SEA IV	France	fighter	1918	
SPAD S.A-1, 2, 3 & 4	France	fighter	1915	
SPAD S.G	France	fighter	1916	
SPAD S.VII	France	fighter	1916	
SPAD S.XI	France	reconnaissance	1917	
SPAD S.XII	France	fighter	1917	
SPAD S.XIII	France	fighter	1917	
SPAD S.XIV	France	fighter	1917	
SPAD S.XV	France	fighter	1917	
SPAD S.XVI	France	reconnaissance	1917	
SPAD S.XVII	France	fighter	1918	
SPAD S.XX	France	fighter	1918	
SPAD S.XXI	France	fighter	1918	
SPAD S.XXIV	France	fighter	1918	
Tellier T.3	France	patrol seaplane	1916	
Tellier T.4	France	patrol seaplane	1917	
Tellier T.5	France	patrol seaplane	1917	
Tellier T.6	France	patrol seaplane	1917	
Vendôme 1914 Monoplane	France	reconnaissance	1914	
Vendôme A3	France	reconnaissance	1916	
Voisin L	France	reconnaissance	1912	
Voisin LA/3	France	reconnaissance	1914	
Voisin LB/LBS/4/Canon	France	fighter	1915	
Voisin LAS/5	France	reconnaissance	1915	
Voisin Triplane	France	bomber	1915	
Voisin E.28 Triplane	France	bomber	1916	
Voisin LC/7	France	reconnaissance	1916	
Voisin LAP/8	France	night bomber	1916	
Voisin LC/9	France	reconnaissance	1917	
Voisin LAR/LBR/10/E.94/11	France	bomber	1917	
Weymann W-1	France	fighter	1915	
Wibault Wib.1	France	fighter	1918	

== Italy ==
Aircraft	Origin	Role(s)	1st flight	Refs
Ansaldo A.1 Balilla	Italy	fighter	1917	
Ansaldo SVA	Italy	reconnaissance	1917	
Caproni Ca.1	Italy	bomber	1915	
Caproni Ca.2	Italy	bomber	1915	
Caproni Ca.3	Italy	bomber	1915	
Caproni Ca.4	Italy	bomber	1918	
Caproni Ca.5	Italy	bomber	1917	
Caproni Ca.20	Italy	fighter	1914	
Caproni Ca.42	Italy	bomber	1918	
Gabardini monoplane	Italy	trainer	1913	
Gabardini biplane	Italy	trainer	1914	
Macchi M.3	Italy	patrol seaplane	1916	
Macchi M.5	Italy	fighter	1917	
Macchi M.7	Italy	fighter	1918	
Macchi M.8	Italy	bomber	1918	
Macchi M.14	Italy	fighter	1918	
Pomilio Gamma	Italy	fighter	1918	
Pomilio PE	Italy	reconnaissance	1917	
SAML S.2	Italy	reconnaissance	1914	
Savoia-Pomilio SP.2	Italy	reconnaissance	1916	
Savoia-Pomilio SP.3	Italy	reconnaissance	1917	
Savoia-Pomilio SP.4	Italy	reconnaissance	1917	
SIA 7	Italy	reconnaissance	1917	
SIA 9	Italy	reconnaissance	1918	
SIAI S.8	Italy	reconnaissance	1917	
SIAI S.9	Italy	reconnaissance	1918	

== Japan ==
Aircraft	Origin	Role(s)	1st flight	Refs
Yokosuka Ro-go Ko-gata	Japan	reconnaissance	1918	

== Russia ==
Aircraft	Origin	Role(s)	1st flight	Refs
Anatra Anadis	Russia	fighter	1916	
Anatra D Anade	Russia	reconnaissance	1915	
Anatra DS Anasal	Russia	reconnaissance	1916	
Anatra DSS	Russia	reconnaissance	1917	
Grigorovich M-5	Russia	patrol seaplane	1915	
Grigorovich M-9	Russia	patrol seaplane	1916	
Grigorovich M-11	Russia	patrol seaplane	1916	
Grigorovich M-12	Russia	patrol seaplane	1916	
Grigorovich M-15	Russia	trainer	1916	
Grigorovich M-20	Russia	patrol seaplane	1917	
Lebed VII	Russia	reconnaissance	1914	
Lebed X	Russia	reconnaissance	1915	
Lebed XI	Russia	reconnaissance	1915	
Lebed XII	Russia	reconnaissance	1915	
Mosca-Bystritsky MBbis	Russia	fighter	1916	
Sikorsky S-5A	Russia	reconnaissance	1913	
Sikorsky S-10	Russia	reconnaissance	1913	
Sikorsky S-12	Russia	trainer	1913	
Sikorsky S-16	Russia	fighter	1916	
Sikorsky S-20	Russia	fighter	1916	
Sikorsky Ilya Muromets	Russia	bomber	1914	

== United Kingdom ==
Aircraft	Origin	Role(s)	1st flight	Refs
23-class airship	UK	training airship	1917	
AD Flying Boat	UK	patrol seaplane	1916	
Airco DH.1	UK	fighter	1915	
Airco DH.2	UK	fighter	1915	
Airco DH.3	UK	bomber	1916	
Airco DH.4	UK	bomber	1917	
Airco DH.5	UK	fighter	1916	
Airco DH.6	UK	trainer	1916	
Airco DH.9	UK	bomber	1917	
Airco DH.9A	UK	bomber	1918	
Airco DH.10 Amiens	UK	bomber	1918	
Alcock Scout	UK	fighter	1917	
Armstrong Whitworth F.K.3	UK	reconnaissance	1915	
Armstrong Whitworth F.K.6	UK	fighter	1916	
Armstrong Whitworth F.K.8	UK	reconnaissance	1916	
Armstrong Whitworth F.K.10	UK	fighter	1916	
Austin-Ball AFB.1	UK	fighter	1917	
Austin A.F.T.3 Osprey	UK	fighter	1918	
Avro 500/E	UK	trainer	1912	
Avro 503	UK	patrol seaplane	1913	
Avro 504	UK	trainer	1913	
Avro 510	UK	patrol seaplane	1914	
Avro 519	UK	bomber	1916	
Avro 521	UK	fighter	1915	
Avro 529	UK	bomber	1917	
BAT Bantam	UK	fighter	1918	
Beardmore W.B.III	UK	fighter	1917	
Blackburn Kangaroo	UK	bomber	1918	
Blackburn Twin Blackburn	UK	Zeppelin fighter	1915	
Boulton & Paul Bobolink	UK	fighter	1918	
Bristol Boxkite	UK	trainer	1910	
Bristol Coanda Monoplanes	UK	trainer	1912	
Bristol S.2A	UK	trainer	1914	
Bristol T.B.8	UK	trainer	1913	
Bristol T.T.A.	UK	fighter	1916	
Bristol Scout	UK	fighter	1914	
Bristol F.2 Fighter	UK	fighter	1917	
Bristol M.1	UK	fighter	1917	
C Star class airship	UK	patrol blimp	1918	
Coastal class airship	UK	patrol blimp	1916	
Fairey Hamble Baby	UK	patrol seaplane	1917	
Fairey Campania	UK	patrol seaplane	1917	
Fairey III	UK	patrol seaplane	1918	
Felixstowe F.1	UK	patrol seaplane	19??	
Felixstowe F.2	UK	patrol seaplane	1916	
Felixstowe F2A	UK	patrol seaplane	1917	
Felixstowe F.3	UK	patrol seaplane	1917	
Felixstowe F.5	UK	patrol seaplane	1918	
Felixstowe Porte Baby	UK	patrol seaplane	1916	
Flanders B.2	UK	trainer	1912	
Grahame-White Type XV	UK	trainer	1913	
Handley Page Type G	UK	trainer	1913	
Handley Page 0/100 and 0/400	UK	bomber	1916	
Handley Page V/1500	UK	bomber	1918	
HMA No. 9r	UK	training airship	1916	
Mann Egerton Type B	UK	patrol seaplane	1916	
Martinsyde G.100 & G.102 Elephant	UK	bomber	1915	
Martinsyde F.3	UK	fighter	1917	
Martinsyde F.4 Buzzard	UK	fighter	1918	
Martinsyde S.1	UK	reconnaissance	1914	
Nieuport B.N.1	UK	fighter	1918	
Norman Thompson N.T.2B	UK	trainer	1917	
Norman Thompson N.T.4	UK	patrol seaplane	1916	
NS class airship	UK	patrol blimp	1917	
Parnall Hamble Baby convert	UK	trainer	1917	
Parnall Panther	UK	reconnaissance	1917	
Pemberton-Billing P.B.9	UK	trainer	1914	
Pemberton-Billing P.B.25	UK	fighter	1915	
Port Victoria Grain Griffin	UK	reconnaissance	1917	
R23X-class airship	UK	patrol airship	1918	
R31-class airship	UK	patrol airship	1918	
Robey-Peters Gun-Carrier	UK	zeppelin fighter	1917	
Royal Aircraft Factory B.E.2	UK	reconnaissance	1912	
Royal Aircraft Factory B.E.3, 4 & 7	UK	reconnaissance	1912	
Royal Aircraft Factory B.E.8	UK	trainer	1913	
Royal Aircraft Factory B.E.9	UK	reconnaissance	1915	
Royal Aircraft Factory B.E.12	UK	fighter	1915	
Royal Aircraft Factory F.E.2	UK	bomber	1915	
Royal Aircraft Factory F.E.4	UK	bomber	1915	
Royal Aircraft Factory F.E.8	UK	fighter	1916	
Royal Aircraft Factory F.E.9	UK	fighter	1917	
Royal Aircraft Factory H.R.E.2	UK	patrol seaplane	1913	
Royal Aircraft Factory R.E.1	UK	reconnaissance	1913	
Royal Aircraft Factory R.E.5	UK	reconnaissance	1914	
Royal Aircraft Factory R.E.7	UK	bomber	1915	
Royal Aircraft Factory R.E.8	UK	reconnaissance	1916	
Royal Aircraft Factory S.E.2	UK	fighter	1913	
Royal Aircraft Factory S.E.4 & 4a	UK	fighter	1914	
Royal Aircraft Factory S.E.5 & 5a	UK	fighter	1917	
Short Bomber	UK	bomber	1916	
Short S.38	UK	trainer	1912	
Short S.57	UK	trainer	1912	
Short S.60	UK	trainer	1913	
Short S.81	UK	experimental seaplane	1913	
Short Type 74	UK	patrol seaplane	1914	
Short Type 81	UK	trainer	1913	
Short Type 135	UK	bomber	1914	
Short Type 166	UK	patrol seaplane	1916	
Short Type 184	UK	patrol seaplane	1915	
Short Type 320	UK	patrol seaplane	1916	
Short Type 827/830	UK	patrol seaplane	1914	
Siddeley-Deasy R.T.1	UK	reconnaissance	1917	
Sopwith 1½ Strutter	UK	reconnaissance	1916	
Sopwith B.1	UK	bomber	1917	
Sopwith Baby	UK	reconnaissance	1915	
Sopwith Bat Boat	UK	patrol seaplane	1913	
Sopwith Bulldog	UK	fighter	1918	
Sopwith Camel & Ship's Camel	UK	fighter	1917	
Sopwith Cuckoo	UK	bomber	1918	
Sopwith Dolphin	UK	fighter	1918	
Sopwith Dragon	UK	fighter	1918	
Sopwith Gunbus	UK	trainer	1914	
Sopwith Hippo	UK	fighter	1917	
Sopwith L.R.T.Tr.	UK	fighter	1916	
Sopwith Pup	UK	fighter	1916	
Sopwith Rhino	UK	bomber	1917	
Sopwith Salamander	UK	bomber	1918	
Sopwith Schneider	UK	reconnaissance	1914	
Sopwith Snail	UK	fighter	1918	
Sopwith Snipe	UK	fighter	1918	
Sopwith Sociable	UK	trainer	1914	
Sopwith Special torpedo seaplane Type C	UK	bomber	1914	
Sopwith Swallow	UK	fighter	1918	
Sopwith Tabloid	UK	reconnaissance	1914	
Sopwith Three-seater & D.1	UK	trainer	1913	
Sopwith Triplane	UK	fighter	1916	
Sopwith Type 807	UK	patrol seaplane	1914	
Sopwith Type 860	UK	patrol seaplane	1914	
Sopwith Type 880 Spinning Jenny	UK	zeppelin fighter	1914	
SS class airship	UK	patrol blimp	1915	
SST class airship	UK	patrol blimp	1918	
SSZ class airship	UK	patrol blimp	1916	
Vickers F.B.5 & F.B.9	UK	fighter	1914	
Vickers F.B.12	UK	fighter	1916	
Vickers F.B.14	UK	fighter	1916	
Vickers F.B.19	UK	fighter	1916	
Vickers Vimy	UK	bomber	1918	
Westland N.1B	UK	fighter	1917	
Westland Wagtail	UK	fighter	1918	
Westland Weasel	UK	fighter	1918	
White and Thompson No. 3	UK	patrol seaplane	1914	
White & Thompson N.T.3 Bognor Bloater	UK	reconnaissance	1915	
Wight Converted Seaplane	UK	patrol seaplane	1916	
Wight Pusher Seaplane	UK	patrol seaplane	1914	
Wight Type 840	UK	patrol seaplane	1915	

== United States ==
Aircraft	Origin	Role(s)	1st flight	Refs
Aeromarine 39	US	trainer	1917	
Aeromarine 40	US	trainer	1918	
Aeromarine 700	US	bomber	1917	
B-class blimp	US	patrol blimp	1917	
Boeing Model C	US	trainer	1917	
Burgess HT-2 Speed Scout	US	reconnaissance	1917	
Burgess Model S	US	trainer	1917	
Burgess Gunbus	US	reconnaissance	1914	
C-class blimp	US	patrol blimp	1918	
Curtiss Model E	US	trainer	1911	
Curtiss Model F	US	trainer	1912	
Curtiss Model H	US	patrol seaplane	1916	
Curtiss Model K	US	patrol seaplane	1915	
Curtiss Model R	US	reconnaissance	1915	
Curtiss HA Dunkirk fighter	US	fighter	1918	
Curtiss HS	US	patrol seaplane	1917	
Curtiss JN-4	US	trainer	1915	
Curtiss F-5L	US	patrol seaplane	1918	
Curtiss MF	US	trainer	1918	
Curtiss 18	US	fighter	1918	
Gallaudet D-4	US	reconnaissance	1918	
Heinrich Pursuit	US	fighter	1917	
Loening M-8	US	fighter	1918	
LWF model V	US	trainer	1916	
LWF model G	US	bomber	1918	
Martin MB-1	US	bomber	1918	
Martin S	US	reconnaissance	1915	
Orenco B	US	fighter	1918	
Packard-Le Père LUSAC-11	US	fighter	1918	
Standard E-1	US	fighter	1917	
Standard H-3	US	trainer	1916	
Standard H-4-H	US	trainer	1917	
Standard J	US	trainer	1916	
Sturtevant S	US	trainer	1916	
Thomas Brothers T-2/SH-4	US	trainer	1914	
Thomas-Morse MB-2	US	fighter	1918	
Thomas-Morse S-4	US	trainer	1917	
Thomas-Morse S-5	US	reconnaissance	1917	
Vought VE-7	US	trainer	1917	
Wittemann-Lewis Training Tractor	US	trainer	1918	
Wright-Martin Model R	US	trainer	1917	
Wright-Martin Model V	US	trainer	1917	
Wright Model G Aeroboat	US	trainer	1913	
Wright Model K	US	trainer	1915	
