= Nieuport 15 =

French WW1 bomber aircraft

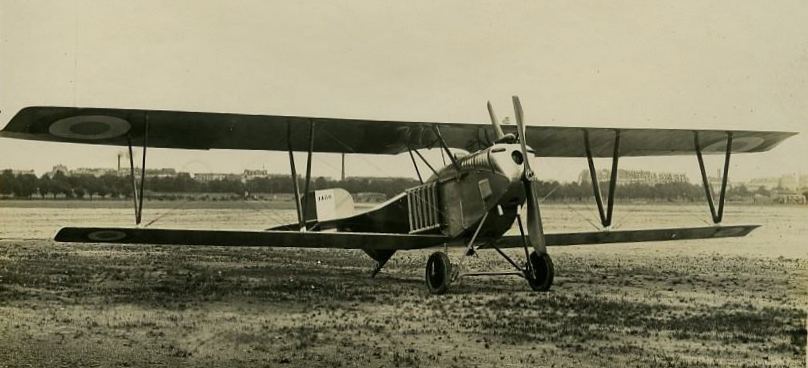
- Nieuport 15 prototype circa 1916

General information
- Type: Bomber
- National origin: France
- Manufacturer: Nieuport
- Status: abandoned
- Number built: At least 4

History
- First flight: November 1916
- Developed from: Nieuport 14

The Nieuport 15 (or Nieuport XV in contemporary sources) was a French World War I bomber aircraft. Due to disappointing performance the type was rejected and never entered service.

== Design and development ==
Scaled up from the Nieuport 14, the new bomber was built in the summer of 1916 and the first prototype was ready for testing in November of that year.

The Nieuport 15 was a two-bay sesquiplane with V-struts and a newly designed tailplane including a heart shaped elevators. It was powered by a 220 hp (160 kW) Renault 12F V-12 engine. with Hazet modular radiators mounted on each side of the fuselage.

During limited flight testing the controls and landing gear were found to be unsatisfactory and the French quickly abandoned the bomber. In December 1916 it was declared obsolete but the British showed some interest and had ordered 70 aircraft but after the tests proved disappointing, all orders were eventually cancelled.

== Specifications ==
Data from History of War

General characteristics

- Crew: 2
- Length: 9.6 m (31.4 ft)
- Wingspan: 17 m (55 ft 9 in)
- Wing area: 47.85 m^{2} (515.1 sq ft)
- Empty weight: 1,330 kg (2,932 lb)
- Max takeoff weight: 1,900 kg (4,189 lb)
- Powerplant: 1 × Renault 12F V-12 water-cooled piston engine, 160 kW (220 hp)
- Propellers: 2-bladed Chauvière 1665, 2.95 m (9 ft 8 in) diameter wooden fixed pitch propeller.

Performance

- Maximum speed: 155 km/h (96 mph, 84 kn)
- Endurance: 3 hours
- Service ceiling: 4,000 m (13,000 ft)
- Time to altitude: 7 min 20 sec to 3,280 ft

Armament

- Guns: 1 x .303 in (7.70 mm) Lewis Gun on an Etévé gun ring.
- Bombs: Fourteen 120 mm (4.72 in) calibre 10.0 kg (22 lb) Anilite bombs - 140 kg (308 lb) total

== See also ==
- 1916 in aviation

Aircraft of comparable role, configuration, and era

- Airco DH.4
- Armstrong Whitworth F.K.8
- Avro 519
- Bréguet XI Corsaire
- Paul Schmitt Type 7
- Voisin VII

Related lists

- List of World War I Entente aircraft
- List of military aircraft of France
- List of bomber aircraft
