= SPAD S.XV =

French WW1 fighter aircraft

S.XV
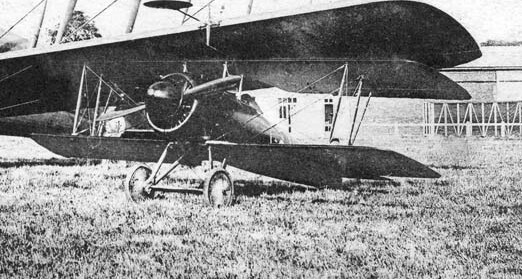

General information
- Type: single-seat fighter
- National origin: France
- Manufacturer: SPAD (Société Pour l'Aviation et ses Dérivés)
- Designer: André Herbemont
- Number built: 5

History
- First flight: 31 July 1917

The SPAD S.XV was a single-seat fighter designed and built in France and offered to fulfil a 1918 C1 specification (C1 - Chasseur single-seat).

== Design and development ==
The 1918 C1 specification called for a medium altitude fighter with 220 kg (490 lb) payload and a 6,500 m (21,300 ft) service ceiling, maximum speed of 240 km/h (150 mph; 130 kn) and absolute ceiling of 9,000 m (30,000 ft). The specification called for the use of several different engine types, one of which was the 160 hp (120 kW) Gnome Monosoupape 9Nc rotary engine. Five aircraft were allocated the Gnome in response to the specification: Morane-Saulnier MoS 27, Morane-Saulnier MoS 29, Courtois-Suffit Lescop CSL-1, Nieuport 28 and SPAD S.XV.

André Herbemont, at SPAD, designed a single-bay biplane with un-staggered, equal span wooden wings and a moulded plywood monocoque fuselage. The closely cowled Gnome engine was mounted in the nose, driving a 2-bladed propeller. Two 7.70 mm (0.303 in) Vickers machine-guns were mounted in the forward upper decking, firing through the propeller disc, using synchronising gear.

First flown on 31 July 1917, the relatively low power of the Gnome engine limited any performance advantage over the SPAD S.XIII, so production was not authorised. The moulded plywood monocoque fuselage concept, however, was used extensively by Herbemont in subsequent designs due to its light weight and high strength.

== Operational history ==
None of the S.XVs were accepted by the Aviation militaire.

== Variants ==
S.XV/1
First S.XV, armed with 2x Vickers machine-guns; one built.
S.XV/2
Second S.XV, reportedly completed with a slightly longer span wings and a re-designed tail; one built.
S.XV/3
Third S.XV, completed with reduced chord and wing area wings and a lengthened fuselage; one built.
S.XV/4
Intended to be powered by a 170 hp (130 kW) Le Rhône 9R, but not completed.
S.XV/5
A post-war sporting aircraft, powered by an 80 hp (60 kW) Le Rhône 9C in a large cowling, one built for René Fonck and another for Charles Nungesser; two built.

== Specifications (S.15/2) ==
Data from

General characteristics

- Crew: 1
- Length: 5.35 m (17 ft 7 in)
- Wingspan: 7.1 m (23 ft 4 in)
- Height: 2.3 m (7 ft 7 in)
- Empty weight: 368 kg (811 lb)
- Gross weight: 625 kg (1,378 lb)
- Powerplant: 1 × Gnome Monosoupape 9Nc 9-cylinder air-cooled rotary piston engine, 120 kW (160 hp)
- Propellers: 2-bladed wooden fixed-pitch propeller

Performance

- Maximum speed: 199 km/h (124 mph, 107 kn) at 2,000 m (6,600 ft)
- Endurance: 2.5 hours
- Time to altitude: 2,000 m (6,600 ft) in 5.67 minutes

Armament

- Guns: 2x 7.70 mm (0.303 in) fixed forward-firing synchronised Vickers machine guns.
