= Paul Schmitt P.S.7 =

French WW1 bomber aircraft

P.S.7
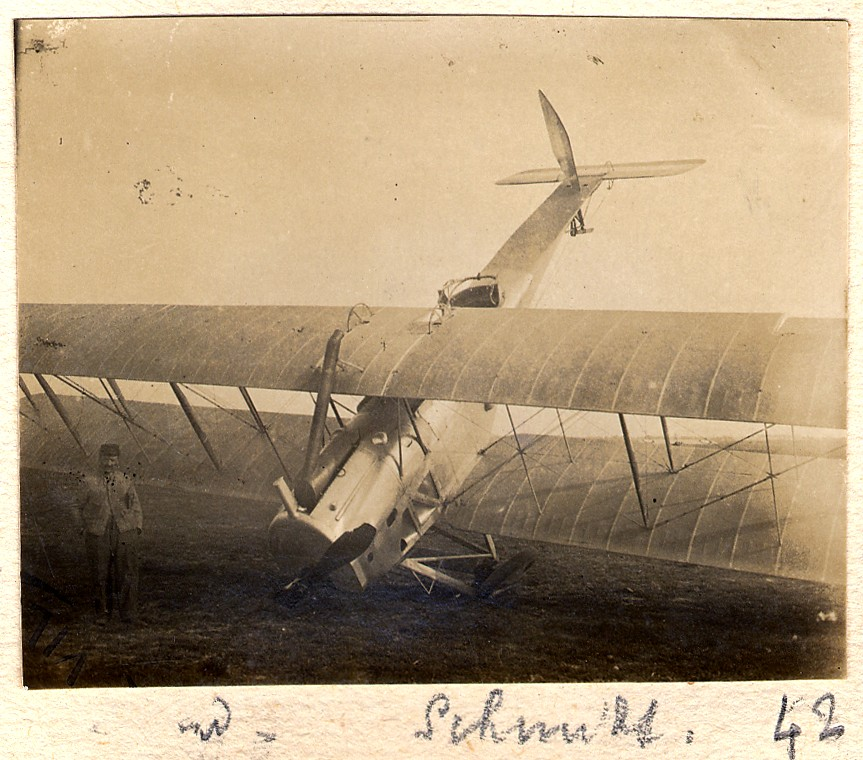

General information
- Type: Bomber
- National origin: France
- Manufacturer: Paul Schmittt
- Number built: 150-200

History
- Introduction date: February 1917
- First flight: 1915
- Developed from: Paul Schmitt P.S.6
- Developed into: Paul Schmitt P.S.10

The Paul Schmitt P.S.7 (company designation of B.R.A.H. (Bomber Renault Aile Haute) - High wing Renault bomber) was a French World War I two-seat biplane bomber that dispensed with the novel variable incidence wing used on prior designs.

== Design ==
The P.S.7 was an oversized, three bay biplane, developed from the preceding Paul Schmitt Aerobus. Each wing bay was divided by addition braces in the same manner as the SPAD VII so as to look like a 6 bay biplane. Its fuselage consisted of a fabric-covered wooden frame, while the flying surfaces were similarly constructed. The engine was mounted on a metal mount, covered with metal panels and equipped with a frontal radiator. The pilot and observer were placed behind the wings, while the fuel and oil tanks were located ahead of the pilot, directly behind the 250 hp (190 kW) Renault 12Fb engine.

The undercarriage was built of tubular steel, the wheels attached to a fixed horizontal axle. The armament consisted of a synchronized machine gun for the pilot and a second machine gun for the observer. Mountings for 150 kg bombs were mounted under the wings.

== Operational history ==
The "Groupe de bombardement 3" (GB.3) - a bomb squadron of the four Escadrilles PS.125-128, which operated on the Western Front was equipped with the aircraft. The aircraft of the last delivery series, which went to the Escadrille PS.128, received an undercarriage with four wheels to improve the ground handling.

At the time of delivery to the escadrilles of the Aéronautique Militaire, the PS-7, constructed in 1915, was already obsolete. Their low speed made the slow and lumbering craft an easy target for enemy antiaircraft guns and fighters. Re-equipping with the more powerful 265 hp Renault engine could not sufficiently alleviate these shortcomings. The P.S.7 were therefore mainly used as a night bomber against long-range targets such as railroad stations and supply depots, as on 13./14. April 1917 against the railway stations in Marl and Crécy-sur-Serre and on 2 May against a German airfield near Saint-Quentin.

The oversized aircraft proved to be so difficult to control that accurately hitting targets was extremely difficult. In addition, the engine proved to be unreliable, so that the operational strength of the squadron temporarily dropped to only twelve machines. The crews now often took with them another Lewis machine gun and additional ammunition for defense, which further reduced the bomb load to 90 kg. Only on the express command of the High Command were further attacks by the squadron carried out. The last major attack was carried out on October 20, 1917. After that, more long-range missions due to the threat of German fighters and enemy anti-aircraft artillery was no longer possible. The remaining PS-7 GB.3 were replaced by January 1918 in the front line by Sopwith 1½ Strutter and Breguet 14s and transferred to training units.

== Specifications ==
Data from

General characteristics

- Crew: 2
- Length: 9.60 m (31 ft 6 in)
- Wingspan: 17.65 m (57 ft 11 in)
- Height: 3.58 m (11 ft 9 in)
- Wing area: 48.4 m^{2} (521 sq ft)
- Empty weight: 1,295 kg (2,855 lb)
- Max takeoff weight: 2,100 kg (4,630 lb)
- Powerplant: 1 × Renault 12F V-12 water-cooled piston engine, 198 kW (265 hp)
- Propellers: 2-bladed 3.00 m (9.84 ft) Régy 325 or 3.05 m (10.0 ft) Régy 282

Performance

- Maximum speed: 135 km/h (84 mph, 73 kn) at 2000 meters
- Range: 4,300 km (2,700 mi, 2,300 nmi)
- Service ceiling: 2,000 m (6,600 ft)

Armament

- Guns: 2x 7.7 mm machine guns
- Bombs: 150 kg of bombs

== See also ==
Aircraft of comparable role, configuration, and era

- Nieuport 15
- Short Bomber

Related lists

- List of bomber aircraft
- List of military aircraft of France
- List of military aircraft of the Entente Powers in World War I
