= Nieuport 14 =

French WW1 reconnaissance aircraft

Nieuport 14 A.2
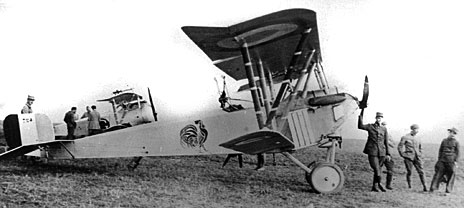

General information
- Type: Reconnaissance aircraft
- National origin: France
- Manufacturer: Nieuport
- Status: retired
- Primary user: Aéronautique Militaire
- Number built: 100

History
- Introduction date: 1916
- First flight: September 1915

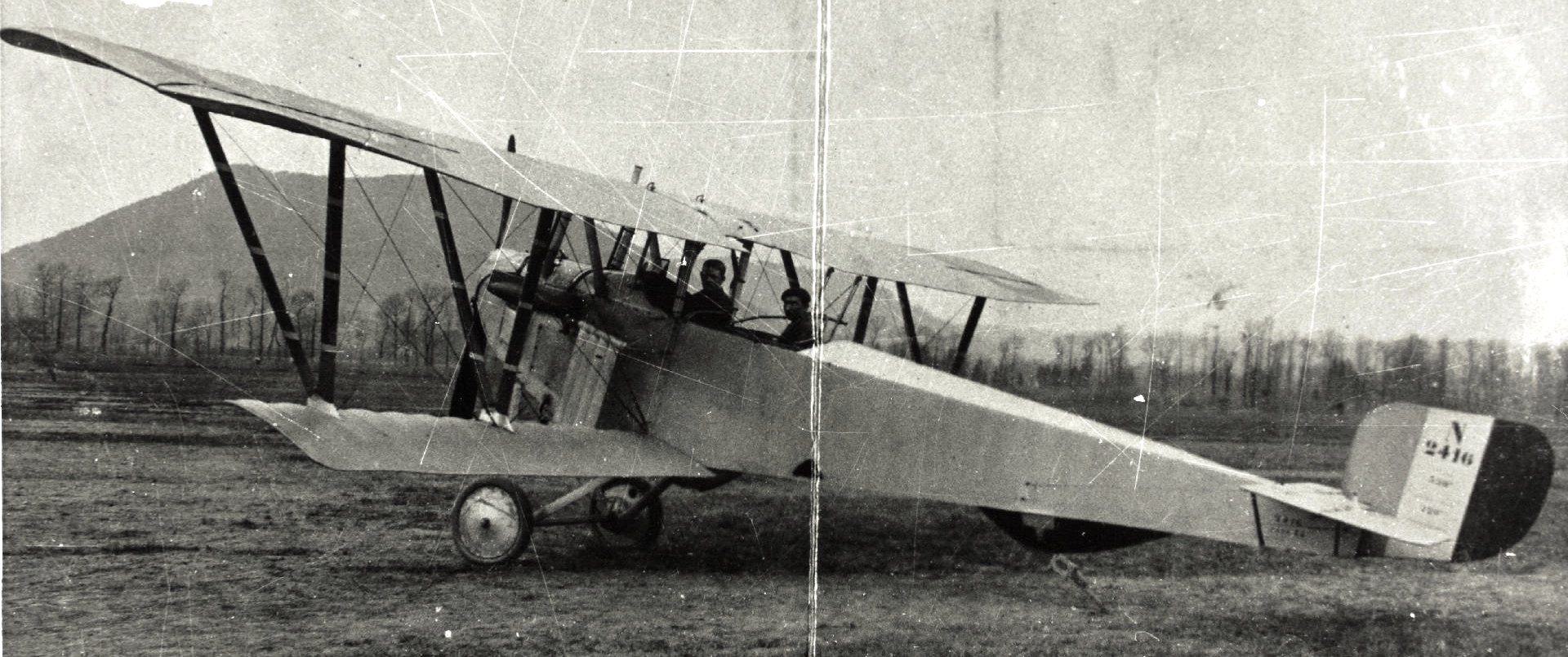
Nieuport 14

The Nieuport 14 (or Nieuport XIV A.2 in contemporary sources) was a military reconnaissance sesquiplane produced in France during the First World War. The French Army deployed it in 1916 but the type was quickly withdrawn from front-line service.

== Development ==
Developed in response to an order by the Aéronautique Militaire in the summer of 1915 for a two-seat reconnaissance machine capable of making a flight of 180 km (110 mi) and back while carrying a load of bombs. Nieuport started with the Nieuport 12 reconnaissance aircraft, but stretched its fuselage to balance the single nose-mounted Hispano-Suiza V-8 engine and its wingspan was increased by the addition of an additional bay. Protracted development that saw some refinement in the engine installation and the wing area increased from 28 m^{2} (300 sq ft) square meters to 30 m^{2} (320 sq ft) resulted in it entering service only in mid 1916.

Further development, with a larger engine and a further enlarged and airframe would result in the Nieuport 15.

Three additional unrelated airframes that some sources have connected to the Nieuport 14 were built, all featuring a nose radiator, single bay wings and a deep hunchback fuselage. One had large wing cut-outs to improve visibility and was fitted with a 180 hp (130 kW) Lorraine-Dietrich 8A engine, another with a 150 hp (110 kW) Hispano-Suiza engine, and a third with a 220 hp (160 kW) Hispano-Suiza engine and a crescent-shaped wing.

With its failure as a combat aircraft, a dedicated trainer variant was developed, the Nieuport 14 École with dual controls, nosewheels to guard against nose-over accidents, and an 80 hp (60 kW) Le Rhone 9C rotary engine in the place of the original V-8. It is possible that some of these airframes had been left over from the original production. When further refined, the trainer version was redesignated the Nieuport 82 E.2 and was nicknamed Grosse Julie ("Big Julie").

== Operational history ==
Deliveries to reconnaissance squadrons commenced in late 1916, replacing obsolete Voisin III and V types. However, changing priorities resulted in production being curtailed as the Hispano-Suiza engines were desperately needed for SPAD VII fighters, and several units including Escadrille 102 and 103 that had planned on operating the Nieuport 14 became fighter units instead, operating the Nieuport 17.

With production halted prematurely, the remaining machines were relegated to training duties and as unit hacks once improvements had been made to their side-mounted Hazet radiators that had been the source of some problems. While the Nieuport 14 only saw service in France, the Nieuport 82 served more widely. Aside from flight schools in France, Brazil operated 9 Nieuport 82s from 1919 to 1924, and Japan operated a small number, with at least one acquiring the civil registration J-TOXC. The first Native American and African-American female aviator Bessie Coleman did some of her training in a Nieuport 82 in France.

== Variants ==
- Nieuport 14 A.2 - service designation of prototype reconnaissance aircraft with 140 hp (100 kW) engine.
- Nieuport 14bis A.2 - designation of production reconnaissance aircraft with 175 hp (130 kW) engine.
- Nieuport 14 E.2 - initial service designation of trainer.
- Nieuport 82 E.2 - purpose-built trainer version with 80 hp (60 kW) rotary engine.

== Operators ==
France

- Aeronautique Militaire
  - Escadrille 62
  - Escadrille 69
  - Escadrille 112
  - Escadrille 202 (operated at least one example)
  - Escadrille 210 (operated one example)

Brazil
Aviacao Militar

Japan
Imperial Japanese Army - Army Aviation Department

== Specifications ==
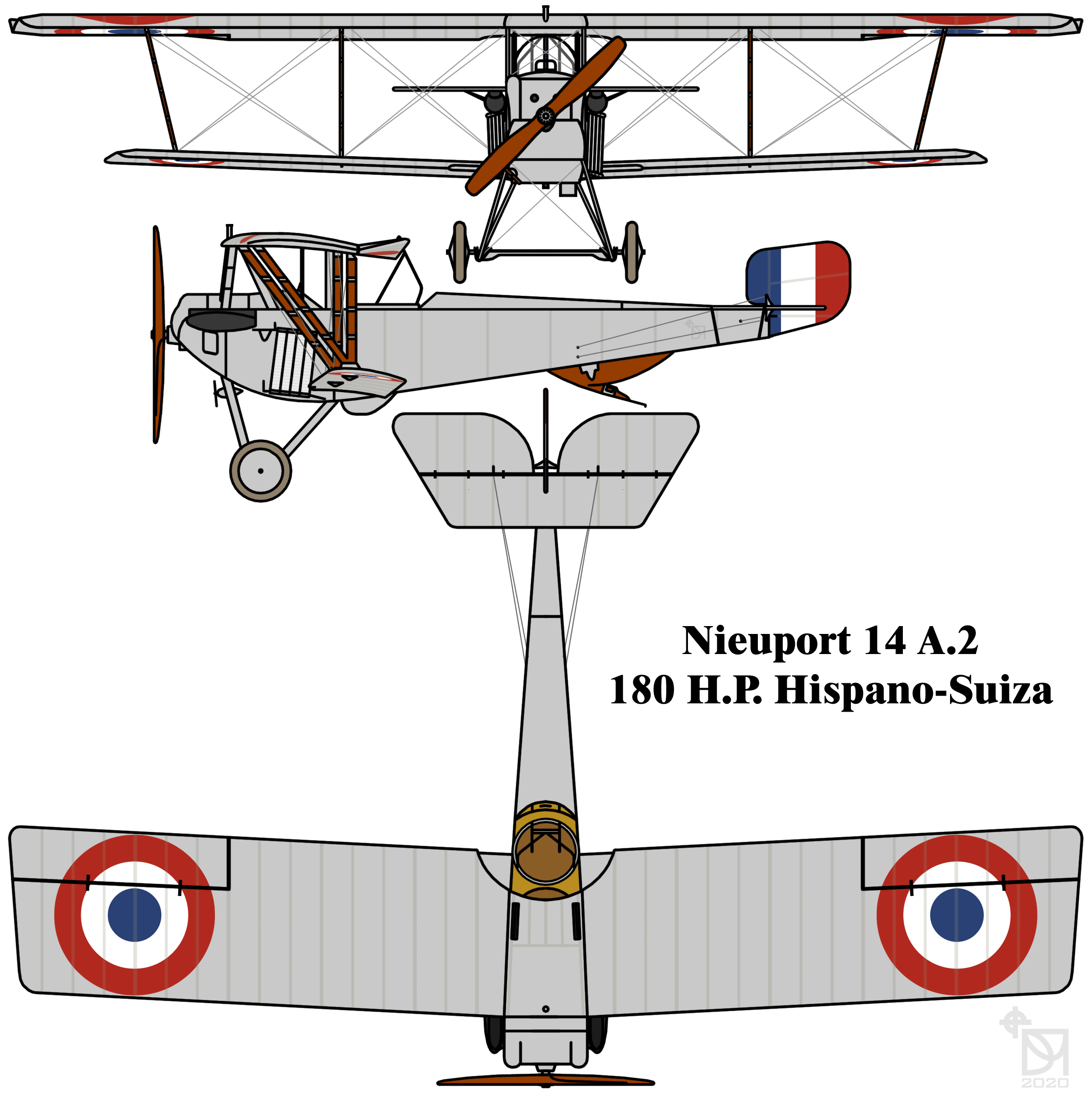
Nieuport 14 3-view drawing

Data from Nieuport Aircraft of World War One and French Aircraft of the First World War

General characteristics

- Crew: Two, pilot and observer
- Length: 7.90 m (25 ft 11 in)
- Wingspan: 11.90 m (39 ft 1 in)
- Height: 2.65 m (8 ft 8 in)
- Wing area: 30.0 m^{2} (323 sq ft)
- Empty weight: 620 kg (1,367 lb)
- Gross weight: 1,030 kg (2,271 lb)
- Powerplant: 1 × Hispano-Suiza 8Aa liquid-cooled V-8 piston engine, 130 kW (175 hp)
- Propellers: 2-bladed Régy 326 or Eclair 8, 2.60 m (8 ft 6 in) diameter wood fixed pitch propeller.

Performance

- Maximum speed: 155 km/h (96 mph, 84 kn) at sea level
  - 138 km/h (86 mph; 75 kn) at 2,000 m (6,600 ft)
  - 129 km/h (80 mph; 70 kn) at 3,000 m (9,800 ft)
- Endurance: 3
- Time to altitude:
  - 15 minutes to 2,000 m (6,600 ft)

Armament

- 1 × trainable 0.303 in (7.7 mm) Lewis gun on Etévé gun ring in rear cockpit for observer
- 4 x 120 mm (4.7 in) bombs

== See also ==
- 1915 in aviation
