= Gabardini biplane =

General information
- Type: Advanced military trainer
- National origin: Italy
- Manufacturer: Società Incremento Aviazione, Cameri

History
- First flight: c.1914

The Gabardini biplane was an Italian single seat biplane, designed and built near the beginning of World War I. It was an advanced trainer and could be fitted with engines of output between about 40 to 80 kW (55 to 105 hp).

== Design and development ==
Intended as an advanced military trainer, the Gabardini was a conventionally laid out two bay biplane, its thin section, unstaggered wings braced together with a near-parallel pair of interplane struts on each side and assisted by flying wires. The lower wing was mounted on the bottom fuselage longerons and the upper wing supported over the fuselage by two pairs of short cabane struts. The fuselage was broadly similar to that of the Gabardini monoplane, deep bellied between the wings, flat sided and flat topped behind the cockpit, tapering markedly rearwards to the tail. The cockpit was just forward of the trailing edge of the upper wing. The biplane's empennage was also similar to that of the monoplane, with its tailplane well forward of the rounded, single piece rudder and mounting a pair of semi-circular elevators. Though the biplane had a skidless conventional undercarriage, with single mainwheels strut-mounted and wire braced to the lower fuselage near the wing leading edge, the tail skid was unusually long and attached at mid-fuselage just aft of the cockpit. On the ground the aircraft had an attitude closer than usual to that attained in-flight, keeping the elevators, which when deflected reached below the fuselage bottom, well clear of the grass.

Variants of the biplane appeared with a range of different rotary engines, each carefully cowled and driving a two bladed propeller. The most powerful of these was an 82 kW (110 hp) Le Rhône. A smaller (60 kW (80 hp))) engine of the same make was also fitted, as was a 37 kW (50 hp) Gnôme. Apart from the effect of different engine diameters, these variants were similar in appearance, though at least one of the higher powered Le Rhone aircraft had a rudder which was less upright and also scallop-edged.

== Specifications (82 kW (110 hp) trainer) ==
Data from Jane's Fighting Aircraft of World War I

General characteristics

- Crew: One
- Wingspan: 7.2 m (23 ft 7 in)
- Height: 2.25 m (7 ft 5 in)
- Wing area: 15.85 m^{2} (170.6 sq ft)
- Gross weight: 535 kg (1,179 lb)
- Powerplant: 1 × Le Rhône rotary engine, 82 kW (110 hp)
- Propellers: 2-bladed

Performance

- Maximum speed: 180 km/h (110 mph, 97 kn) "low down""
- Wing loading: 33.7 kg/m^{2} (6.9 lb/sq ft)
- Power/mass: 0.15 kW/kg (0.093 hp/lb)
