= Paul Schmitt P.S.10 =

French WW1 bomber aircraft

P.S.10 B.2

General information
- Type: Bomber
- National origin: France
- Manufacturer: Paul Schmitt
- Number built: 1

History
- First flight: 1917
- Developed from: Paul Schmitt P.S.7

The Paul Schmitt PS.10 was a prototype World War I French two-seat biplane bomber.

== Development ==
The P.S.10 was a refinement of the previous P.S.7, fitted with a heavier armament and a more powerful 300 hp (220 kW) Renault 12Fe engine however the success of the Breguet 14 meant there was no official interest and none entered service.

== Specifications (Paul Schmitt P.S.10) ==
Data from

General characteristics

- Crew: 2
- Length: 9.10 m (29 ft 10 in)
- Wingspan: 14.65 m (48 ft 1 in)
- Height: 3.59 m (11 ft 9 in)
- Wing area: 50.00 m^{2} (538.2 sq ft)
- Empty weight: 1,140 kg (2,513 lb)
- Max takeoff weight: 1,870 kg (4,123 lb)
- Powerplant: 1 × Renault 12Fe V-12 water-cooled piston engine, 220 kW (300 hp)
- Propellers: 2-bladed
- Maximum speed: 182 km/h (113 mph, 98 kn) at 2000 meters
- Range: 5,400 km (3,400 mi, 2,900 nmi)
- Service ceiling: 2,000 m (6,600 ft)

== See also ==
Related lists

- List of bomber aircraft
- List of military aircraft of France
- List of military aircraft of the Entente Powers in World War I
