= Salmson 3 =

1910s WW1 French fighter aircraft

Sal 3 C.1
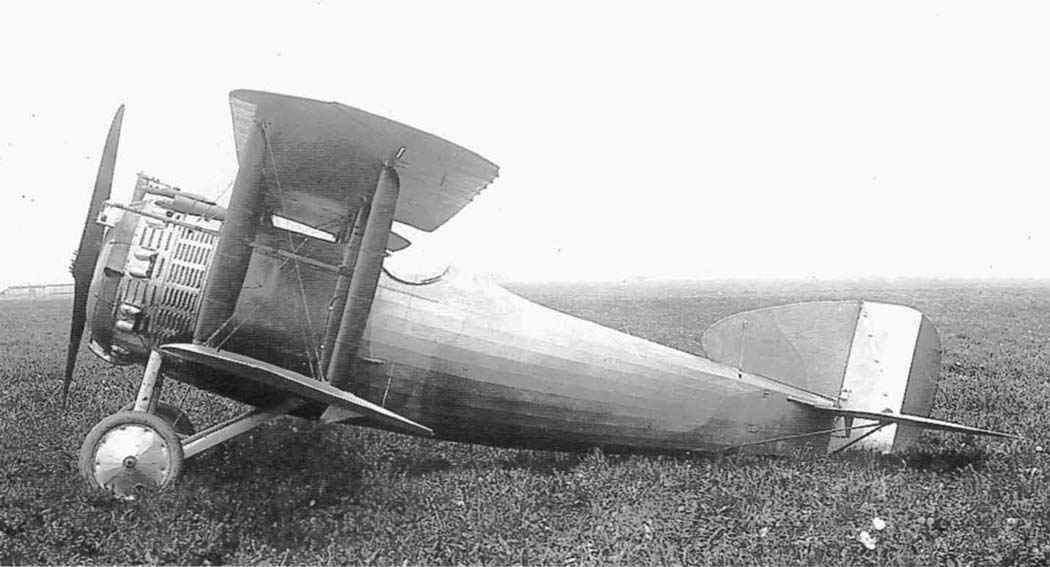

General information
- Type: Fighter
- National origin: France
- Manufacturer: Salmson
- Status: Abandoned
- Number built: 1

History
- First flight: 1917
- Developed from: Salmson 2 A.2

The Salmson 3 C.1 was a French World War I biplane fighter aircraft developed by Salmson which lost out in competition to the SPAD XIII and Morane-Saulnier AI.

== Design ==
The Sal 3 C1 was a biplane of all-wood construction, originally built with a 230 hp (170 kW) Salmson 9Z, but re-engined with a 260 hp (190 kW) Salmson 9Zm in an effort to rectify deficiencies in performance.

Flight tests began in late 1917, but pilots complained of poor visibility and difficulties operating the machine. Although the Salmson 3 prototype was returned to the factory for modifications, further tests were unable remedy the deficiencies sufficiently, and the French military judged the Salmson 3 to be inferior to the SPAD XIII in performance.

== Specifications (Sal 3 C1) ==
Data from Salmson aircraft of World War I; Airwar : Salmson Sal.3

General characteristics

- Crew: 1
- Length: 6.4 m (21 ft 0 in)
- Wingspan: 9.85 m (32 ft 4 in)
- Height: 2.48 m (8 ft 2 in)
- Wing area: 23.936 m^{2} (257.64 sq ft)
- Empty weight: 696.7 kg (1,536 lb)
- Gross weight: 1,026.7 kg (2,263 lb)
- Powerplant: 1 × Salmson 9Zm 9-cylinder water-cooled radial piston engine, 190 kW (260 hp)
- Propellers: 2-bladed Ratmanoff CUH

Performance

- Maximum speed: 215 km/h (134 mph, 116 kn) at 2,000 m (6,600 ft)

207 km/h (129 mph; 112 kn) at 4,000 m (13,000 ft)
202 km/h (126 mph; 109 kn) at 5,000 m (16,000 ft)
190 km/h (120 mph; 100 kn) at 6,000 m (20,000 ft)

- Cruise speed: 182 km/h (113 mph, 98 kn)
- Range: 350 km (220 mi, 190 nmi)
- Service ceiling: 7,000 m (23,000 ft)
- Time to altitude: 1,000 m (3,300 ft) in 2.73 minutes

2,000 m (6,600 ft) in 5.43 minutes
4,000 m (13,000 ft) in 13.28 minutes
5,000 m (16,000 ft) in 21 minutes
6,000 m (20,000 ft) in 34.1 minutes

Armament

- Guns: 2 x fixed, forward-firing, synchronised 7.7 mm (0.30 in) Vickers machine guns
