= Salmson 4 =

SAL-4 AB.2

General information
- Type: Reconnaissance / Ground attack / Bomber
- National origin: France
- Manufacturer: Société des Moteurs Salmson
- Primary user: Aéronautique Militaire
- Number built: 12

History
- Introduction date: 1918
- First flight: 1918
- Retired: 1920
- Developed from: Salmson 2

The Salmson 4 AB.2, or SAL-4 AB.2 (AB.2 - Reconnaissance Bomber two-seat) was a two-seat bomber designed and built in France during the closing stages of World War I.

== Design and development ==
A variant of the Salmson 2, the Salmson 4 was essentially an enlarged version with a greater wingspan, three bay wings of greater area, enlarged vertical tail surfaces and detail changes to the engine installation. Twelve aircraft were built for l'Aéronautique Militaire before the end of World War I, all of which were assigned to operational escadrilles in anticipation of widespread deployment following orders for mass production, which were cancelled with the end of the war. They were withdrawn in 1920.

== Specifications (SAL-4 AB.2) ==
Data from Salmson SAL-4

General characteristics

- Crew: 2
- Length: 8.78 m (28 ft 10 in)
- Wingspan: 15.2 m (49 ft 10 in)
- Height: 2.96 m (9 ft 9 in)
- Wing area: 49.28 m^{2} (530.4 sq ft)
- Empty weight: 1,410 kg (3,109 lb)
- Gross weight: 1,935 kg (4,266 lb)
- Powerplant: 1 × Salmson 9Zm 9-cyl. water-cooled radial engine, 190 kW (260 hp)
- Propellers: 2-bladed Regy 822
- Maximum speed: 180 km/h (110 mph, 97 kn)
- Range: 500 km (310 mi, 270 nmi)
- Service ceiling: 6,000 m (20,000 ft)
- Time to altitude: 1,000 m (3,300 ft) in 8 minutes 21 seconds

Armament

- Guns: 1x fixed machine gun over the forward fuselage decking, plus 1x manually aimed machine-gun on a flexible mount in the rear cockpit

== See also ==
Related development

- Salmson 2 A.2

Related lists

- List of World War I Entente aircraft
