= Avro 510 =

510

General information
- Type: Racing and patrol seaplane
- National origin: United Kingdom
- Manufacturer: Avro
- Primary user: Royal Naval Air Service
- Number built: 6

History
- First flight: July 1914
- Variants: Avro 519

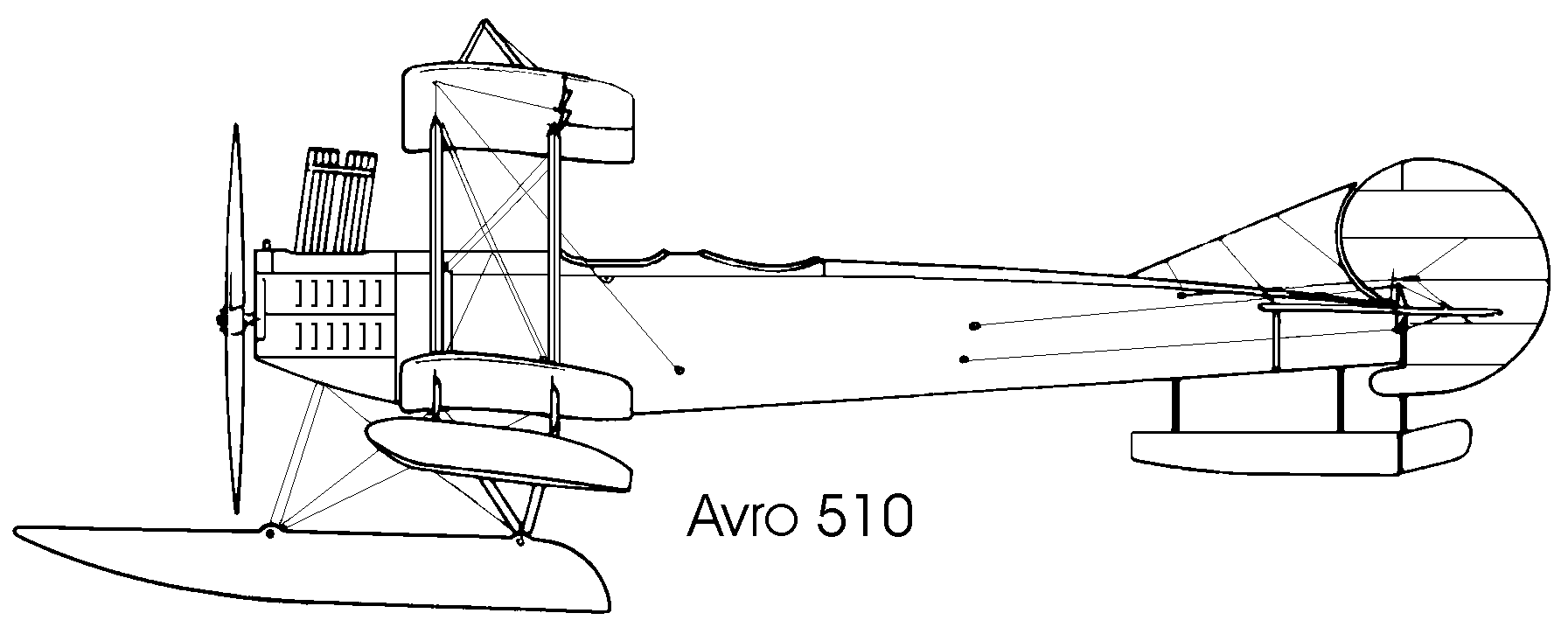

The Avro 510 was a two-seat racing seaplane designed by Avro to compete in the 1914 Circuit of Britain Race. It was a conventional two-bay biplane of greatly uneven span, equipped with two large central floats and two outriggers. The race was called off at the outbreak of the First World War, but the British Admiralty was aware of the type and ordered five examples, with modified floats and tail. In service, these proved completely unsuitable, and it was discovered that with a second person aboard, the aircraft could barely fly. In October 1915, the 510s in service were sent to Supermarine for modification and improvement, but by March the following year all were removed from service.

== Specifications ==
Data from Avro Aircraft since 1908

General characteristics

- Crew: 1
- Capacity: 1
- Length: 38 ft 0 in (11.58 m)
- Wingspan: 63 ft 0 in (19.20 m)
- Wing area: 564 sq ft (52.4 m^{2})
- Empty weight: 2,080 lb (943 kg)
- Gross weight: 2,800 lb (1,270 kg)
- Powerplant: 1 × Sunbeam Crusader V-8 water-cooled piston engine, 150 hp (110 kW) ^{[a]}
- Propellers: 2-bladed fixed-pitch propeller

Performance

- Maximum speed: 70 mph (110 km/h, 61 kn)
- Endurance: 4 hours 30 minutes
- Time to altitude: 4 1/2 minutes to 1,000 ft (305 m)

== See also ==
Related development

- Avro 519

== Notes ==
^{a} Most sources give the powerplant of the 510 as a Sunbeam Nubian, an engine that would not yet exist until all the 510s had been withdrawn from service in 1916. The Wolverhampton Museum of Industry website cites Eric Brew's Sunbeam Aero Engines and identifies the 510's engine as a Crusader.
