= Audenis C2 =

C2

General information
- Type: Trainer
- National origin: France
- Designer: Charles Auddenis
- Number built: 1

History
- First flight: 1916

The Audenis C2 was a two-seat fighter biplane, designed and built in France during 1916. Probably powered by a 130 hp (97 kW) Clerget 9B 9-cylinder rotary engine, the C2 had equal span single bay biplane wings with the lower mainplane set well below the fuselage attached by the rear undercarriage struts and a pair of struts at the leading edge. The undercarriage was of conventional tailskid configuration with the mainwheel axle attached to the fuselage by V-struts. Pilot and gunner were seated in individual cockpits with the pilot under the centre-section and the gunner aft of the wings, provided with a single fixed Vickers machine-gun fired by the pilot and a machine-gun on a ring in the rear cockpit. Development of the C2 did not continue after initial flight trials.

== Specifications (C2) ==
Data from French aircraft of the First World War

General characteristics

- Crew: 2
- Powerplant: 1 × Clerget 9B 9-cylinder air-cooled rotary piston engine, 97 kW (130 hp)
- Propellers: 2-bladed fixed-pitch propeller

Armament

- Guns: 1x fixed forward firing 7.7 mm (0.303 in) Vickers machine-gun on the forward fuselage decking and 1x machine gun on a flexible mount in the rear cockpit.
