= Béchereau SAB C.1 =

General information
- Type: Biplane fighter
- National origin: France
- Manufacturer: Societe et Ateliers Béchereau
- Designer: Louis Béchereau
- Number built: 5

History
- First flight: 11 November 1918

The Béchereau SAB C.1 was a French single-seat fighter biplane designed by a team led by Louis Béchereau who had designed biplane fighters for SPAD including the SPAD S.VII.

== Design and development ==
The C.I was a two-bay single-seat fighter biplane powered by a 300 hp (224 kW) Hispano-Suiza 8Fb inline piston engine. Without any production facilities the aircraft was built by Levasseur and five aircraft were built and tested during 1918. Following the end of the first world war the aircraft was not developed further and did not enter production.

== Specifications ==
Data from Illustrated Encyclopedia of Aircraft, French aircraft of the First World War

General characteristics

- Crew: 1
- Length: 6.90 m (22 ft 8 in)
- Wingspan: 9.35 m (30 ft 8 in)
- Height: 2.55 m (8 ft 4 in)
- Empty weight: 783 kg (1,726 lb)
- Gross weight: 1,122 kg (2,474 lb)
- Powerplant: 1 × Hispano-Suiza 8Fb inline piston engine, 220 kW (300 hp)
- Propellers: 2-bladed

Performance

- Maximum speed: 210 km/h (130 mph, 110 kn)

Armament

- Guns: Two fixed forward-facing 0.303in Vickers machine-guns
