= B.A.J. IVC.2 =

IV C2

General information
- Type: Two-seat biplane fighter
- National origin: France
- Manufacturer: Boncourt-Audenis-Jacob
- Number built: 2

History
- First flight: 1918

The B.A.J. IV C2 (or the Boncourt-Audenis-Jacob Type IV) was a French two-seat fighter designed and built by Boncourt-Audenis-Jacob, (Monsieur Boncourt, Charles Audenis & Jean Jacob), at Bron.

== Design and development ==
The IVC.2 was an equal-span two-bay biplane powered by a 300 hp (224 kW) Hispano-Suiza 8Fb inline piston engine. It was fitted with a fixed and synchronised forward firing Vickers machine-gun and the observer had a mounted twin Lewis Gun. The type was ordered by the French government in May 1918 as the Type IV C2 and by November the prototype was test flying from Villacoublay. Testing went well, but the prototype was returned to Bron for repairs, replaced by the second prototype. A fire in late 1918 at Bron led to the development of the type being abandoned.

== Specifications ==
Data from Illustrated Encyclopedia of Aircraft

General characteristics

- Crew: 2
- Powerplant: 1 × Hispano-Suiza 8Fb inline piston engine, 220 kW (300 hp)
- Propellers: 2-bladed fixed-pitch propeller

Armament

- Guns: One fixed 7.7 mm (0.303 in) Vickers machine-gun and an observer operated twin 7.7 mm (0.303 in) Lewis guns on a T.O.3 ring
