= Salmson 5 =

Salmson 5 A.2

General information
- Type: Artillery spotting
- National origin: France
- Manufacturer: Société des Moteurs Salmson
- Number built: 1

History
- Introduction date: n/a
- First flight: 1917
- Retired: n/a
- Developed from: Salmson 2

The Salmson 5 was a French aircraft built in 1917 during World War I intended for artillery spotting. It was based on the Salmson 2, but it was 23 km/h slower and offered no compensating advantages and only 1 aircraft was built.

== Specifications ==
Data from British and Allied Aircraft Manufacturers of the First World War

General characteristics

- Crew: 2
- Length: 7.80 m (25 ft 7 in)
- Wingspan: 12.20 m (40 ft 0 in)
- Height: 2.90 m (9 ft 6 in)
- Empty weight: 1,410 kg (3,109 lb)
