= Anilite bomb =

- Type: Aerial bomb
- Place of origin: France

Service history
- In service: World War I
- Used by: Allied Forces

Production history
- Designed: 1915–16

Specifications
- Mass: 10 kg (22 lb); 25 kg (55 lb); 50 kg (110 lb)
- Diameter: 120 mm (4.72 in); 155 mm (6.10 in); 200 mm (7.87 in)
- Filling: Nitrogen Dioxide (NO_{2}) and Gasoline
- Filling weight: 6 kg (13 lb); 12 kg (26 lb); 25 kg (55 lb)
- Detonation mechanism: contact detonator

Anilite bombs, also known as Gros Andreau bombs, were introduced early in the First World War for dropping from aircraft.

== Description ==
The Anilite bomb consisted of two compartments; one filled with gaseous Nitrogen Dioxide (NO_{2}) and another filled with Gasoline or any other suitable / available hydrocarbon to proportions of 80% NO_{2} and 20% hydrocarbon as oxidiser and fuel respectively.

Once released the two components mixed inside the casing becoming explosive after mixing. This gave the advantage of relatively safe handling with low risk of premature detonation, even with rough handling. If the bomb components did not mix or the gas leaked, the bomb became an incendiary device. Disadvantages included the toxicity of the NO_{2} if leakage occurred, with several instances of crews being poisoned and incapacitated by leaking bombs and the relative fragile nature of the casing which meant that the bombs had none or little penetration on impact, limiting their effectiveness.

The Gros Andreau bombs were produced in three calibres:

120 mm (4.72 in)
weighing 10 kg (22 lb), containing 6 kg (13 lb) of explosive.
155 mm (6.10 in)
weighing 25 kg (55 lb), containing 12 kg (26 lb) of explosive.
200 mm (7.87 in)
weighing 50 kg (110 lb), containing 25 kg (55 lb) of explosive.

== Operational history ==
Gros Andreau bombs proved effective and relatively safe to use and were first dropped on Karlsruhe on 22 June 1916, being withdrawn from use in 1918 and replaced with bombs filled with Melinite (picric acid and guncotton) and Mononitronaphthalene known as MMN bombs.
