= Nieuport 12 =

French WW1 fighter and reconnaissance aircraft

Nieuport 12 and 12bis
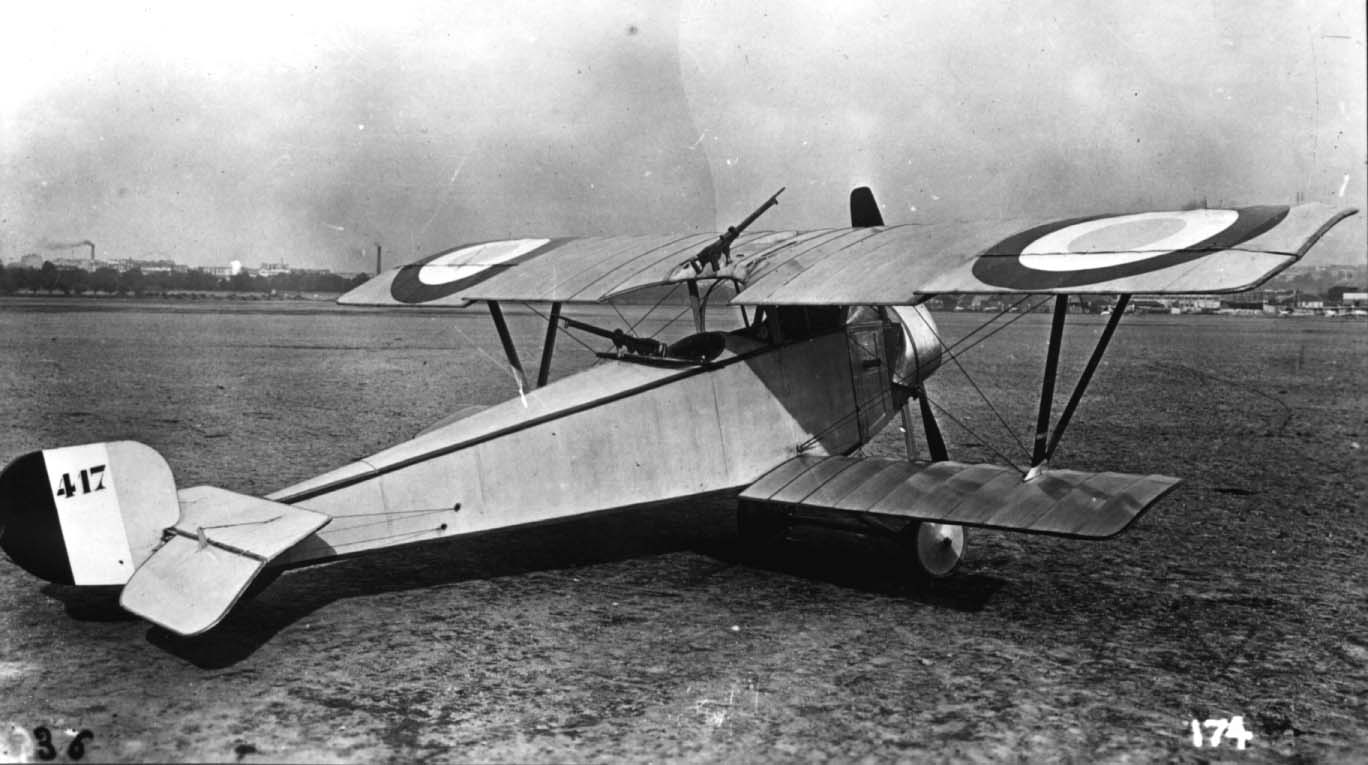
- Nieuport 12 A.2 prototype

General information
- Type: Reconnaissance(Artillery)/Fighter/Trainer
- Manufacturer: Nieuport
- Designer: Gustave Delage
- Status: retired
- Primary users: France Imperial Russian Air Service; Royal Naval Air Service; Royal Flying Corps
- Number built: 300+

History
- Manufactured: 1915–1918
- Introduction date: 1915
- First flight: 1915
- Developed from: Nieuport 10

The Nieuport 12 (or Nieuport XII in contemporary sources) was a French sesquiplane reconnaissance, fighter aircraft and trainer used by France, Russia, Great Britain and the United States during World War I. Later production examples were built as trainers and served widely until the late 1920s.

== Design and development ==
To improve the performance of the Nieuport 10 a re-engined version was developed as the Nieuport 12 with a significantly enlarged upper wing. A Lewis gun was fitted to the rear cockpit for use by the observer, normally on an Etévé ring (known as the Nieuport ring in British service) although early examples used a pedestal mount or half ring. A second Lewis was sometimes fitted to fire over the top wing. Nieuport 12s built by Beardmore used by the Royal Flying Corps were sometimes fitted with a Scarff ring instead of the Nieuport ring, and a synchronized Vickers gun for the pilot. Additional modifications were made to those built by Beardmore.

It could be fitted with either a 100 hp (75 kW) Clerget, 130 hp (97 kW) Clerget 9B engine or 110 hp (82 kW) Le Rhône 9J mounted in the nose.

== Variants ==
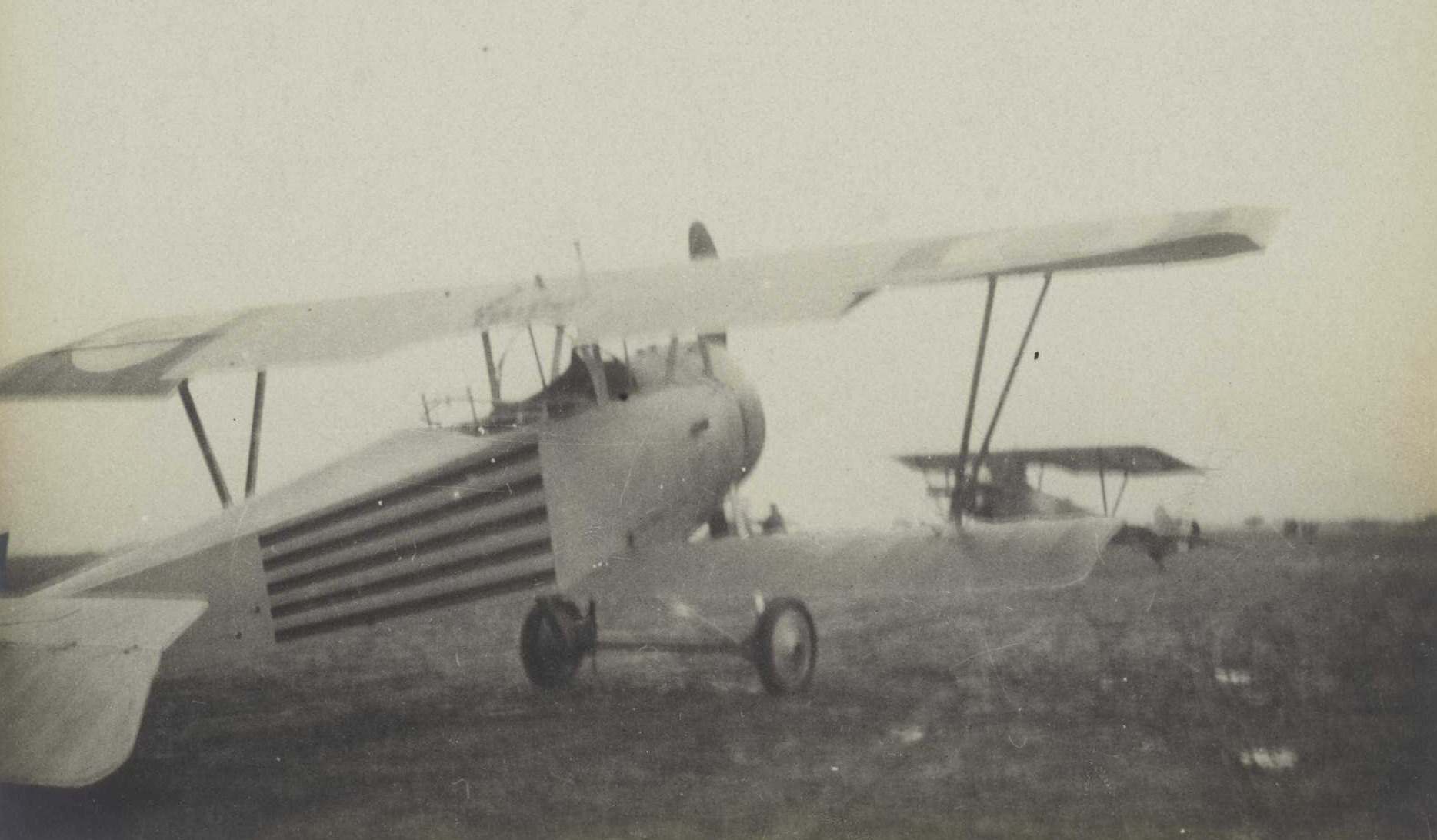
Nieuport 12bis of Escadrille N69

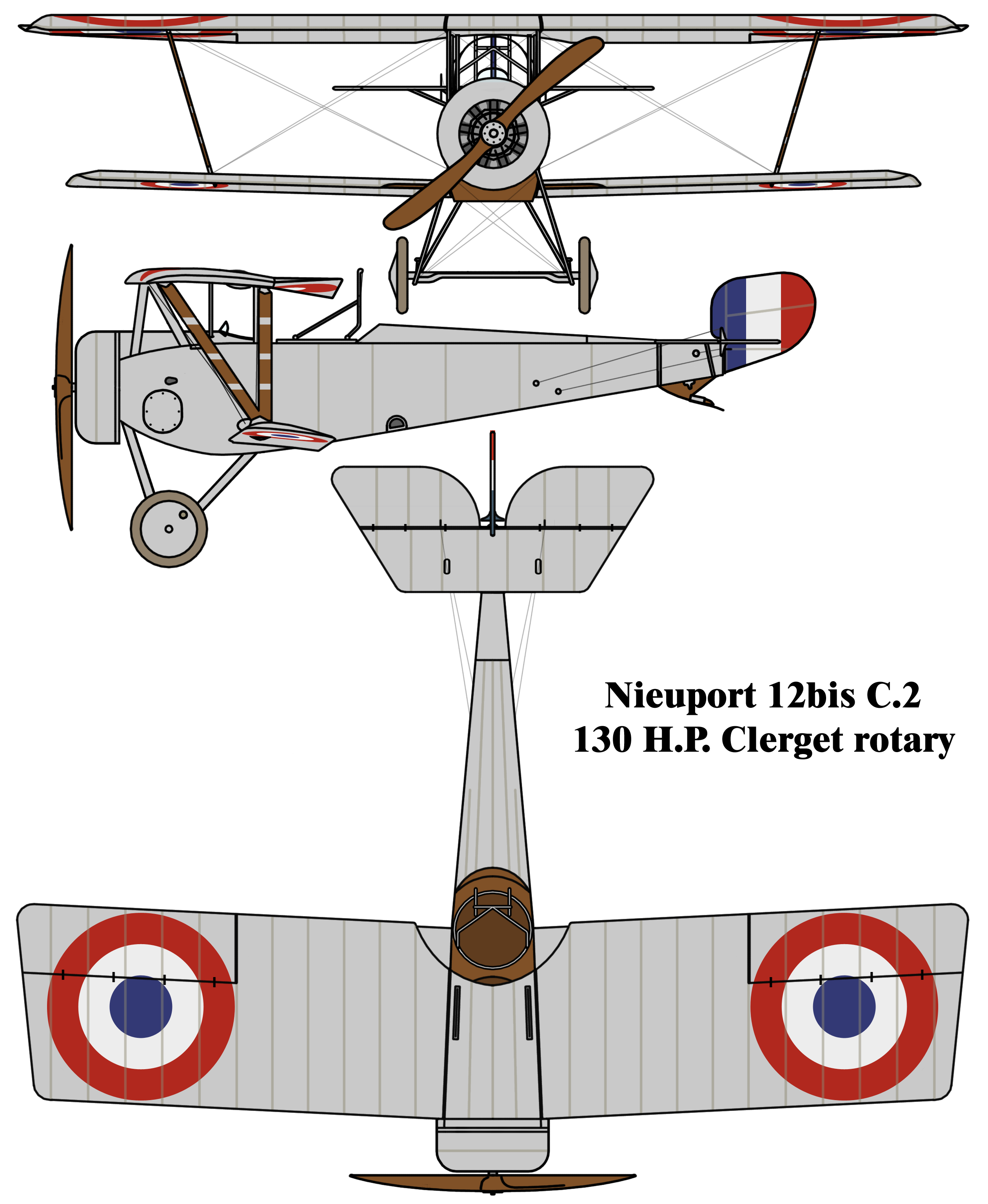
Nieuport 12bis C.2

Nieuport 12 A.2
Two-seat fighter-reconnaissance biplane, powered by 110 hp (82 kW) Clerget 9Z engine. or 110 hp (82 kW) Le Rhône 9J.
Nieuport 12bis C.2
Revised version with 130 hp (97 kW) Clerget 9B engine and streamlined side fairings.
Nieuport 13
Two prototypes with increased span but same nominal wing area as 12. One powered by a 140 hp (100 kW) Hispano-Suiza 8, and the other by an 80 hp (60 kW) Le Rhône 9C.
Nieuport 20
Version powered by 110 hp (82 kW) Le Rhône 9J. Not used by France, but 21 delivered to Royal Flying Corps. All but first examples externally similar to 12bis.
23 meter Nieuport
Unofficial generic designation for all types listed here based on nominal wing area of 23 square meters.
Nieuport 80 E.2 and 81 E.2
Nieuport 12s were later built in large numbers specifically as training aircraft with the gun ring removed. 8 in designation referred to 80 hp (60 kW) Le Rhône 9C. These differed in having flight controls for just the pilot in the rear seat (81 E.2), or both pilot and passenger (80 E.2).
Nieuport 12 (Beardmore)
Beardmore progressively redesigned the Nieuport 12 during a production run of 50 aircraft so early examples were almost stock but late production examples differed considerably in detail. These were fitted with 110 hp (82 kW) Clerget 9Z and 130 hp (97 kW) Clerget 9B rotaries.
Mitsubishi Army Type Kō 1 Trainer
Japanese designation for licence built Nieuport 81 E.2s. 57 built.
Trainer Type 1
Siamese designation for Nieuport 80 E.2.
Sipowicz 1
Polish experimental aircraft using lifting struts similar to the Wright-Bellanca WB-2.

== Operators ==
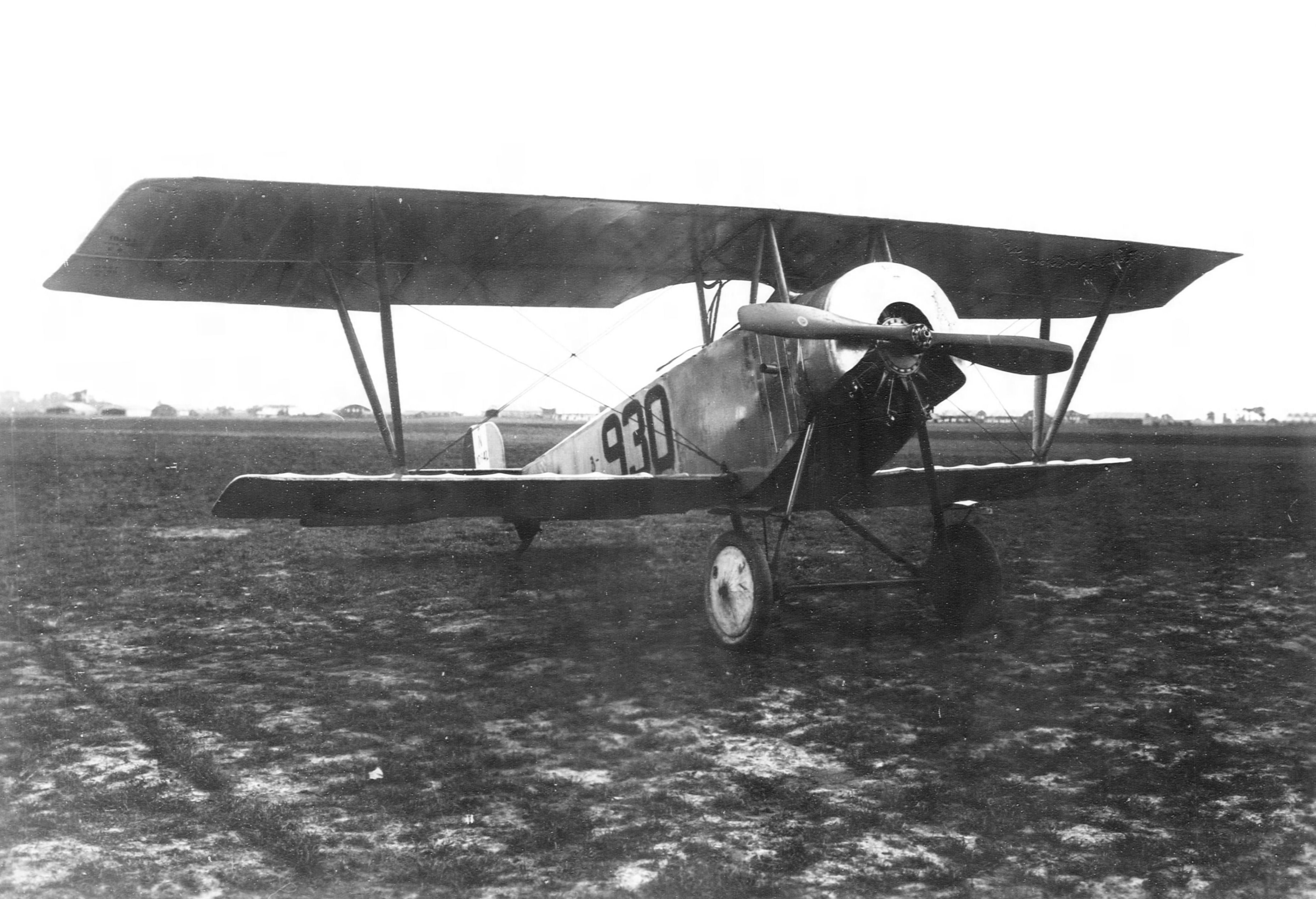
American Nieuport 80 E.2 trainer

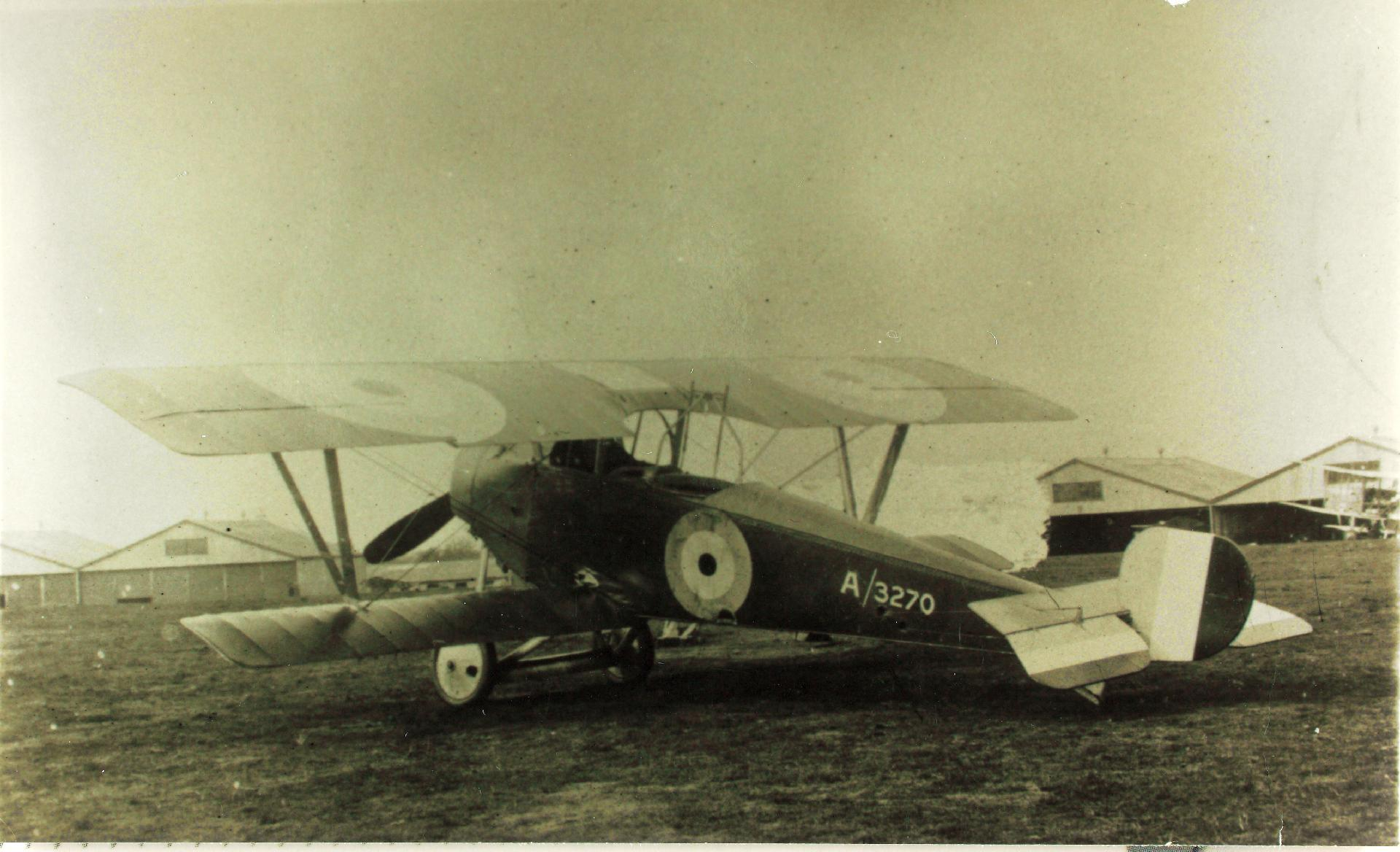
Royal Flying Corps Nieuport 12 built by Beardmore. Elevator stripes were a Beardmore trademark.

Argentina

- Argentine Naval Aviation – One aircraft in 1919

Belgium

- Belgian Air Force

Chile

- Chilean Air Force – One aircraft only.

France

- Aéronautique Militaire

Estonia

- Estonian Air Force – Postwar.

Greece

- Royal Hellenic Navy

Japan

- Imperial Japanese Army Air Service – received 40 Nieuport 81 E.2 from France in 1919, supplemented with 57 licence-built aircraft.

Poland

- Polish Air Force

Portugal

- Portuguese Air Force

Romania

- Romanian Air Corps

Russian Empire

- Imperial Russian Air Service

Serbia

- Serbian Air Force

(Thailand) Siam

- Royal Siamese Aeronautical Service – One aircraft only. Locally designated B.F.1 (Thai: บ.ฝ.๑).

United Kingdom

- Royal Flying Corps
  - No. 45 Squadron RFC
  - No. 46 Squadron RFC
  - No. 65 Squadron RFC
  - No. 84 Squadron RFC
- Royal Naval Air Service
  - No. 7 Squadron RNAS
  - No. 10 Squadron RNAS

United States

- American Expeditionary Force

Soviet Union
Workers' and Peasants' Air Fleet

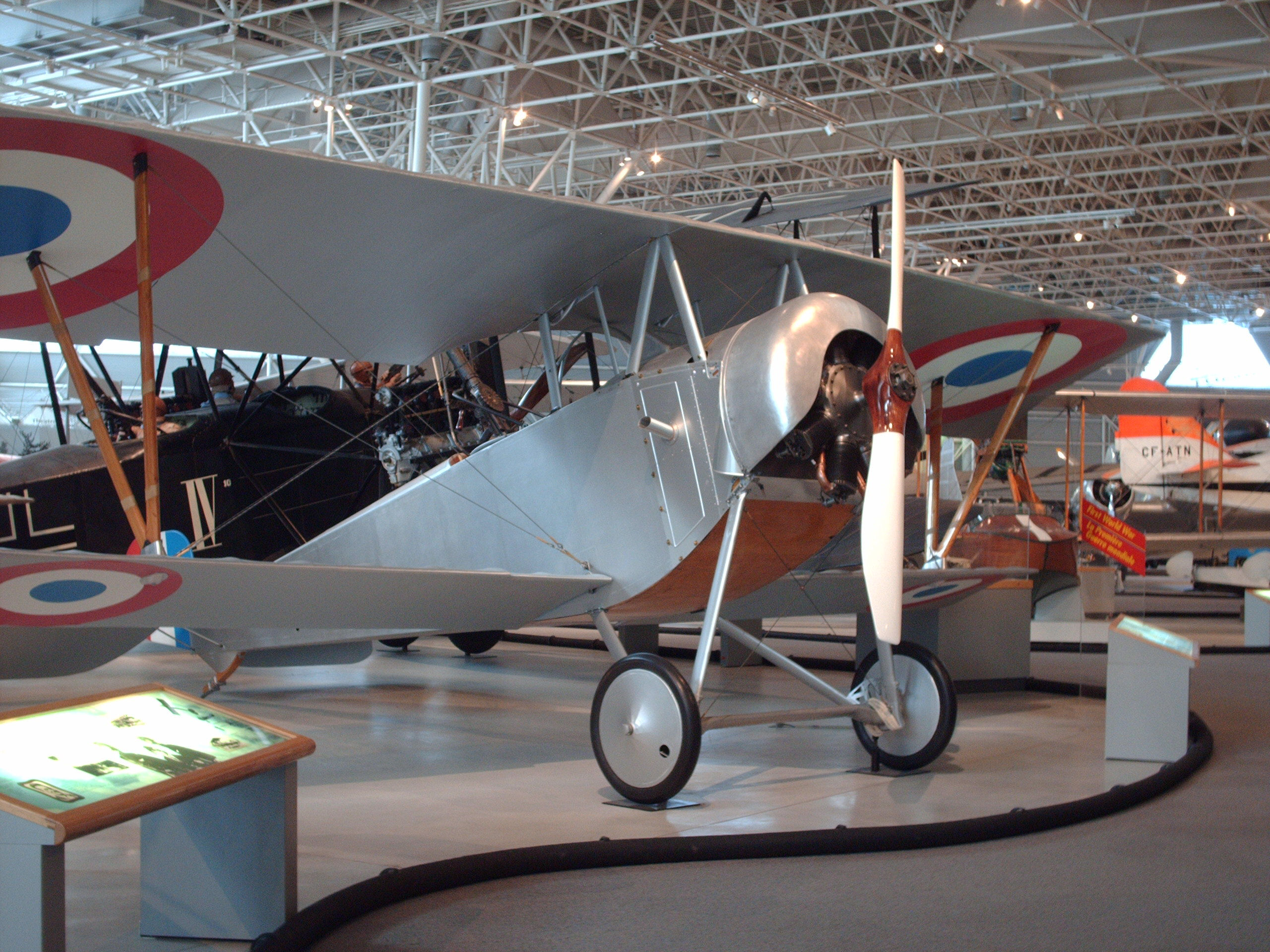
Nieuport 12 at the Canada Aviation and Space Museum.

== Survivor ==
A single ex-French Nieuport 12 is on display following an extensive restoration (including reinstalling the original Le Rhône 9J rotary engine) at the Canada Aviation and Space Museum in Ottawa in the late 1990s. This aircraft was donated to the Canadian Dominion Archives along with a Canon de 75 modèle 1897 cannon and an extensive collection of propaganda posters by the French Government in 1916 and was used for war bond drives until the 1918 flu pandemic resulted in it being placed in storage. In the late 1960s the Royal Canadian Air Force partially converted it into an RFC Beardmore example for display.

== Specifications (French-built Nieuport 12 A.2) ==
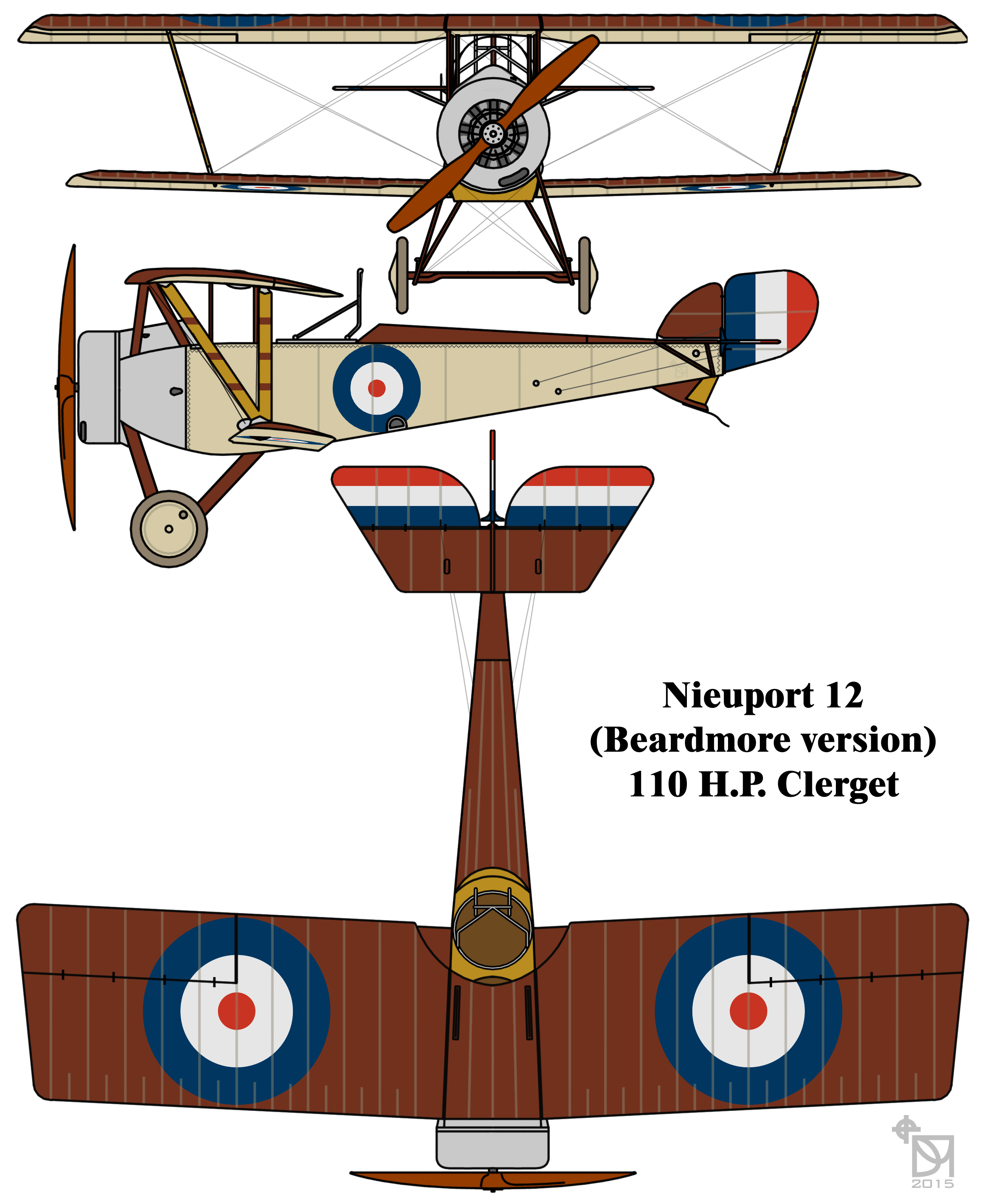
Drawing of late production Beardmore-built Nieuport 12 incorporating their modifications

Data from Davilla, 1997, p.369

General characteristics

- Crew: Two (pilot and observer/gunner)
- Length: 7.10 m (23 ft 4 in)
- Wingspan: 9.00 m (29 ft 6 in) measurements of survivor indicate 9.15 m (30.0 ft)
- Height: 2.70 m (8 ft 10 in)
- Wing area: 22.00 m^{2} (236.8 sq ft)
- Empty weight: 550 kg (1,213 lb)
- Gross weight: 825 kg (1,819 lb)
- Fuel capacity: 120 kg
- Powerplant: 1 × Clerget 9Z 9 cylinder air-cooled rotary engine, 82 kW (110 hp)
- Propellers: 2-bladed 2.50 m (8 ft 2 in) Régy 274 or 2.55 m (8 ft 4 in) Régy 289 or 2.53 m (8 ft 4 in) Eclair 2 wood fixed pitch propeller.

Performance

- Maximum speed: 146 km/h (91 mph, 79 kn) at 2,000 m (6,600 ft)
- Range: 500 km (310 mi, 270 nmi)
- Endurance: 3 hours
- Service ceiling: 4,000 m (13,000 ft)
- Time to altitude: 14 minutes 15 seconds to 2,000 m (6,600 ft)

Armament

- 1 × .303 in (7.7 mm) Lewis gun on Etévé gun ring in rear cockpit and occasionally a second one on the upper wing

== See also ==
- 1915 in aviation

Related development

- Nieuport 10

Related lists

- List of military aircraft of France
- List of aircraft of the Royal Flying Corps
- List of aircraft of the Royal Naval Air Service
- List of World War I Entente aircraft
- List of fighter aircraft
- List of military aircraft of the United States (1909–19)
