= Avro 519 =

519 and 522
- Avro 519

General information
- Type: Bomber
- National origin: United Kingdom
- Manufacturer: Avro
- Number built: 4

History
- First flight: 1916
- Developed from: Avro 510

The Avro 519 was a British bomber aircraft of the First World War, a development of the Avro 510 seaplane. They were two-bay biplanes of conventional configuration with greatly uneven span. Two single-seat examples, powered by a single 150 hp (110 kW) Sunbeam water-cooled engine, were ordered by the RNAS in early 1916. This was soon followed by orders for two modified aircraft for the Royal Flying Corps. These were fitted with seats for a crew of two and had more powerful (225 hp/168 kW) Sunbeam engines

The first of the two-seaters was designated 519A to reflect its modifications. The second two-seater, however, was so different that it received a completely new number from Avro - 522 - and featured new wings with both upper and lower wings of equal but greater span, in the hope that this would rectify the type's poor climbing performance.

Never used operationally, all four were used for flight testing with the last still in service in April 1917.

There are some indications that the Avro 522A formed part of the equipment of 2 Squadron, Royal Canadian Air Force in the 1920s.

== Specifications (519) ==
Data from Avro Aircraft since 1908

General characteristics

- Crew: one pilot
- Length: 32 ft 9 in (9.98 m)
- Wingspan: 63 ft 0 in (19.21 m)
- Height: 11 ft 8 in (3.56 m)
- Wing area: 600 sq ft (55.8 m^{2})
- Gross weight: 3,000 lb (1,360 kg)
- Powerplant: 1 × Sunbeam Nubian V-8 , 150 hp (112 kW)

Performance

- Maximum speed: 75 mph (121 km/h, 65 kn)
- Rate of climb: 200 ft/min (1.0 m/s)

Armament

- Bombs carried on underfuselage racks

== See also ==
Related development

- Avro 510
