= Bréguet 11 Corsaire =

WWI French bomber

Bréguet XI
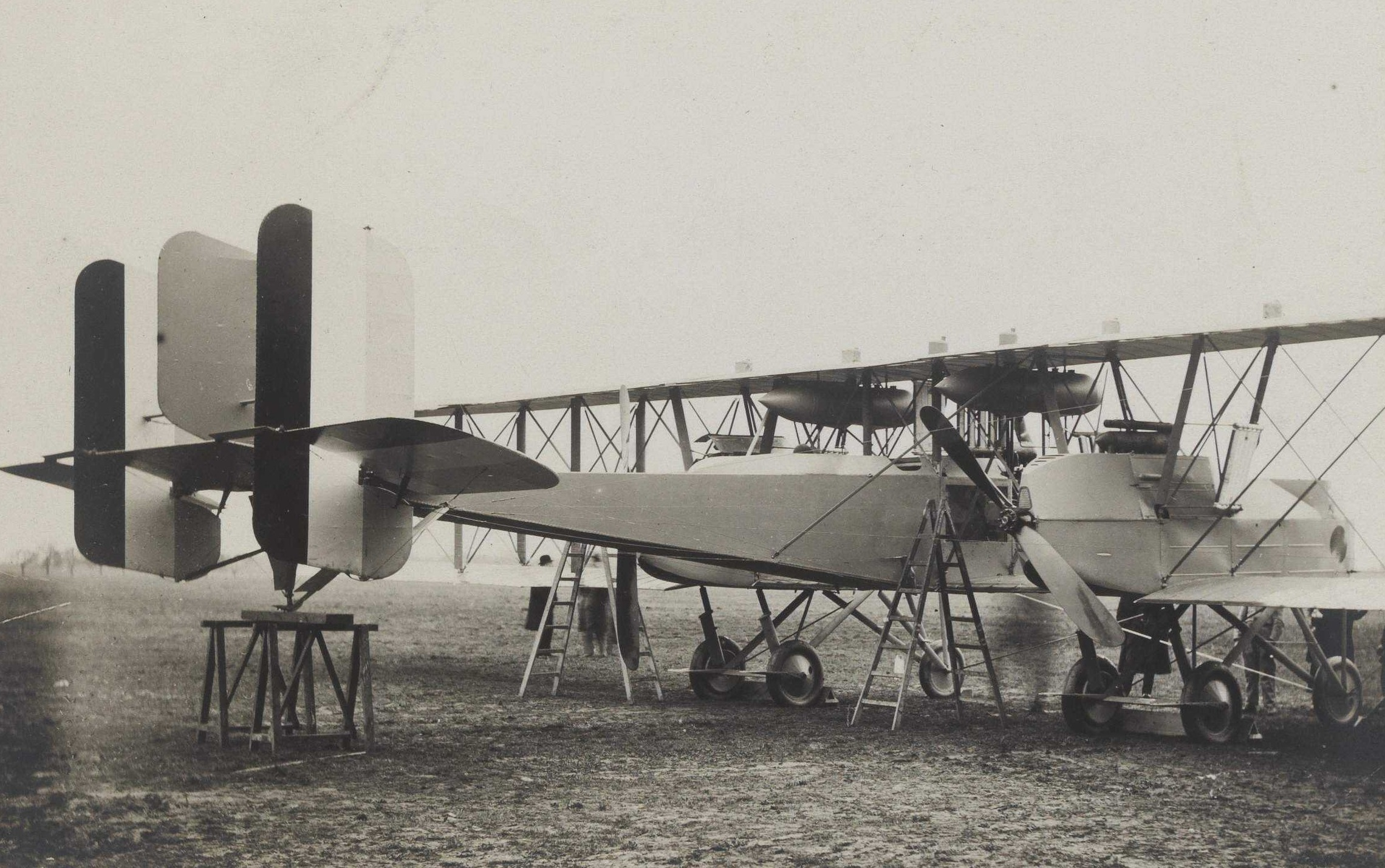

General information
- Type: Bomber
- Manufacturer: Breguet
- Designer: Marcel Vuillierme
- Primary user: Aéronautique Militaire
- Number built: 1

History
- First flight: February 1916

The Bréguet XI was a prototype French biplane bomber of the First World War.

== Development ==
In 1915, German fighters and well-established air defense systems made flights by French bombers extremely unsafe. French commanders therefore urgently ordered the production of new, more sophisticated bomber aircraft. Two main lines of development were devised - the development of light, high-speed and heavy, but well-protected aircraft.

The first flight of the Bréguet XI took place in February 1916. Despite the satisfactory test results, the French military refused the aircraft, arguing that the Bréguet XI was too large for frontline aviation.

== Specifications ==
Data from

General characteristics

- Crew: 4
- Length: 11.9 m (39 ft 1 in)
- Wingspan: 27.65 m (90 ft 9 in)
- Height: 4 m (13 ft 1 in)
- Wing area: 105.2 m^{2} (1,132 sq ft)
- Empty weight: 3,100 kg (6,834 lb)
- Max takeoff weight: 4,865 kg (10,725 lb)
- Powerplant: 3 × Renault 8Gd V-8 water-cooled piston engine, 160 kW (220 hp) each
- Propellers: 2-bladed pusher propeller

Performance

- Maximum speed: 148 km/h (92 mph, 80 kn)
- Cruise speed: 120 km/h (75 mph, 65 kn)
- Range: 900 km (560 mi, 490 nmi)
- Service ceiling: 6,000 m (20,000 ft)
- Rate of climb: 4.86 m/s (957 ft/min)
- Wing loading: 32 kg/m^{2} (6.6 lb/sq ft) (at max. takeoff weight)
- Power/mass: 0.15 kW/kg (0.09 hp/lb) (at max. takeoff weight)

Armament

- Guns:

1x 37 mm (1.457 in) cannon in a fixed mount in the front cockpit
2 × flexible 7.7 mm (0.303 in) machine guns

- Bombs: 300 kg (660 lb) of bombs

== See also ==
Related development

- Breguet Bre.6
- Breguet 16

Aircraft of comparable role, configuration, and era

- Airco DH.4
- Airco DH.9
- Caproni Ca.3

Related lists

- List of military aircraft of France
- List of bomber aircraft
