= Courtois-Suffit Lescop CSL-1 =

1910s French fighter aircraft

CSL C1
- An oblique view of the CSL-1, c. 1918

General information
- Type: Prototype fighter
- Manufacturer: S.A.I.B.
- Designer: Roger Courtois-Suffit and Capitaine Pierre Lescop
- Number built: 1

History
- First flight: January 1918

The Courtois-Suffit Lescop CSL C1 was a prototype French biplane fighter built in the final months of World War I by the Société Anonyme d'Application Industrial du Bois (S.A.I.B.). It was among the first aircraft to be fitted with leading-edge flaps on the lower wing. It was not put into production.

== Development and description ==
Roger Courtois-Suffit and Capitaine Pierre Lescop designed the CSL-1 to satisfy a French Military Aviation (Aviation Militaire) requirement for a single-seat fighter issued in 1917 for service the following year. It was designed to use the nine-cylinder 160-horsepower (120 kW) Gnome Monosoupape 9Nc rotary engine, but a 140-horsepower (100 kW) Clerget 9Bf rotary had to be used instead when the 9Nc was unavailable. A subsequent model was intended to use the 11-cylinder 200-horsepower (150 kW) Clerget 11E rotary whenever it became available.

The CSL-1 was a single-bay biplane with a fabric-covered wooden fuselage with its engine covered by a full metal cowling. The two-spar wings were of the same construction and were connected with single streamlined I-shaped interplane struts. Inverted V-shaped cabane struts connected the upper wing to the fuselage in front of the cockpit. The ailerons were located at the outer ends of the lower wing and were operated by torque tubes. The lower wing was also fitted with 1.3-metre-wide (4 ft 3 in) plywood leading-edge flaps at its ends that were 0.18 metres (7.1 in) deep. The flaps were hinged to the forward wing spar and covered with fabric. The leading edge of the horizontal stabiliser was also equipped with a full-width flap that measured 0.15 metres (5.9 in) in depth. S.A.I.B. had built British Sopwith 1½ Strutter bombers under license and the CSL-1 used a variant of that aircraft's conventional landing gear with each wheel on a half-axle connected by a spreader bar.

Construction of the prototype began in October 1917 at S.A.I.B.'s Paris factory and the aircraft made its first flight in January 1918. The CSL-1 was noted as undergoing testing on 1 May 1918, but nothing is known of its performance or how well its leading-edge flaps performed. The aircraft was not selected for production along with all the other aircraft designed to use the Monosoupape 9Nc engine.

== Specifications (All performance data is estimated) ==
Data from French Aircraft of the First World War,; French Warplanes of WWI: A Centennial Perspective on Great War Airplanes; Volume 1: Fighters

General characteristics

- Crew: 1
- Length: 7.6 m (24 ft 11 in)
- Wingspan: 7.8 m (25 ft 7 in)
- Height: 2.8 m (9 ft 2 in)
- Wing area: 19 m^{2} (200 sq ft)
- Empty weight: 470 kg (1,036 lb)
- Gross weight: 760 kg (1,676 lb)
- Powerplant: 1 × Clerget 9Bf 9-cylinder air-cooled rotary piston engine, 100 kW (140 hp)
- Propellers: 2-bladed fixed-pitch propeller

Performance

- Maximum speed: 220 km/h (140 mph, 120 kn) at sea level
- Endurance: 2 hours 30 minutes
- Time to altitude: 4,000 m (13,000 ft) in 16 minutes

== Bibliography ==
- Davilla, Dr. James J. & Soltan, Arthur M. (1997). French Aircraft of the First World War. Stratford, Connecticut: Flying Machines Press. ISBN 0-9637110-4-0.
- Green, William & Swanborough, Gordon (2001) [1994]. The Complete Book of Fighters: An Illustrated Encyclopedia of Every Fighter Built and Flown (Revised and Updated ed.). London: Salamander Books. ISBN 1-84065-269-1.
- Owers, Colin A. (2020). French Warplanes of WWI: A Centennial Perspective on Great War Airplanes. Great War Aviation Centennial Series (43). Vol. 1: Fighters. n.p.: Aeronaut Books. ISBN 978-1-935881-93-3.
