= Gabardini monoplane =

Monoplane
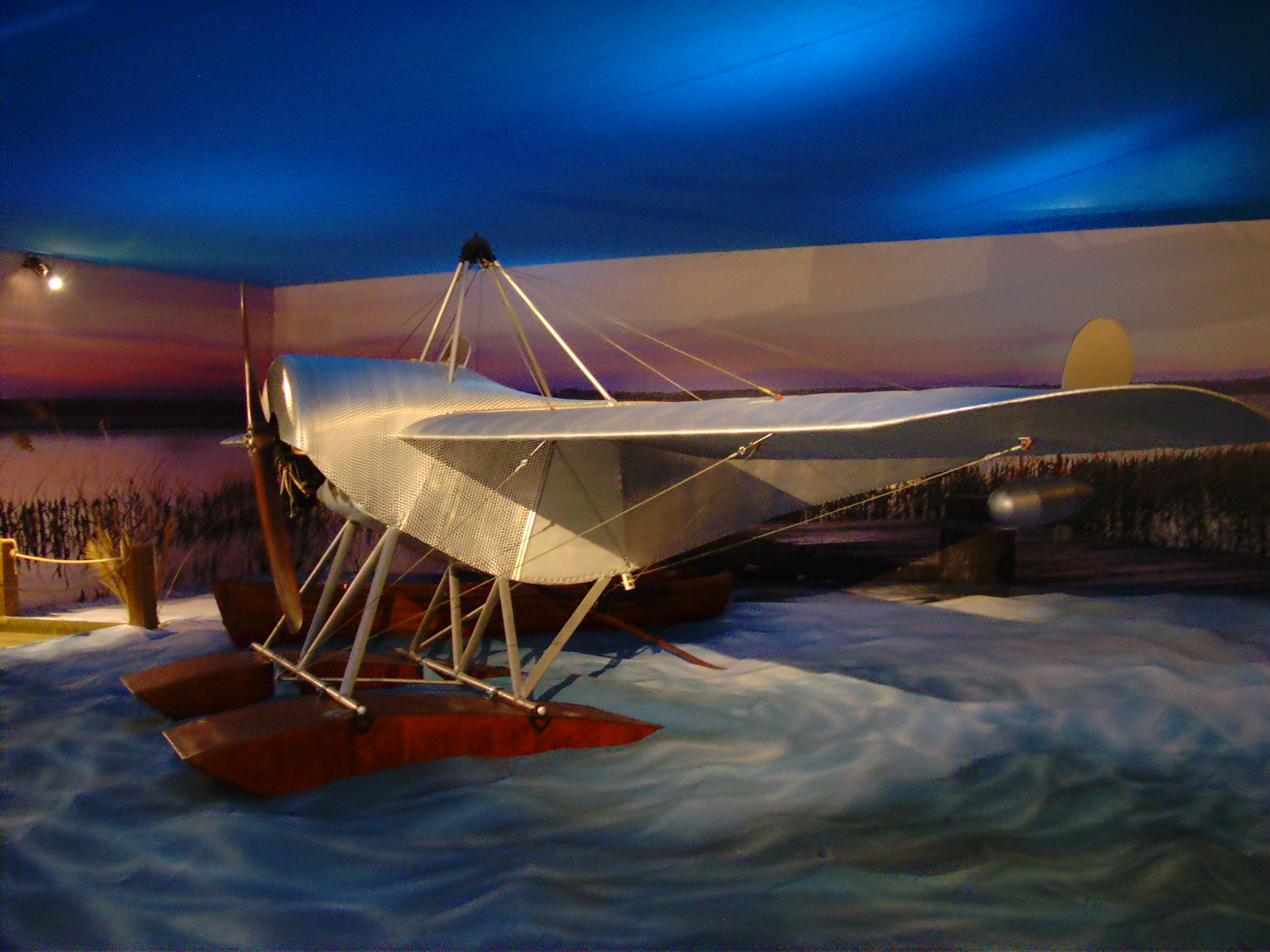
- Float equipped Gabardini monoplane, Volandia Museum, Varese

General information
- Type: Early monoplane and military trainer
- National origin: Italy
- Manufacturer: Società Incremento Aviazione, Cameri

History
- First flight: 1913

The Gabardini monoplane was a successful early monoplane constructed in Italy which made several notable flights, often carrying passengers, just before World War I. During the war, a number of lower-powered Gabardini monoplanes served as a training aircraft for the military.

== Design and development ==
The Gabardini monoplane, then fitted with a 60 kW (80 hp) rotary engine and capable of carrying two passengers for 240 km (150 mi), gained attention as an effective if inelegant monoplane through a series of public appearances, flying at the beginning of a period dominated by multiplane aircraft. Fitted with a 50 horsepower (37 kW) Gnôme rotary, it proved a useful single-seat advanced trainer and was produced at the Cameri works from 1914 onwards. Other variants differed chiefly in engine size, though undercarriage details also varied; there were, for example, elementary trainers with 35 horsepower (26 kW) Anzani engines and single-seaters with 80 horsepower (60 kW) Le Rhônes. Reported spans differ somewhat but the fuselage, empennage and wing area generally remained constant. Contemporary sources describe the aircraft simply as Gabardini monoplanes, with no type number, though it is known that there also existed a Gabardini 2 (or Ga.2), which was a monoplane trainer used at Cameri.

The Gabardini monoplane was designed with a steel tube structure, which was unusual. Its shoulder mounted monoplane wings were built around two tubular steel spars, with wooden ribs and canvas covering. In plan view the low aspect ratio wings were barely straight, tapered to generously rounded tips. Roll control was by wing warping, with conventional control column input. The wings were wire-braced to the fuselage from above as well as from below. The three upper wires on each side, one from the front spar and two from the rear at about mid-span, ran to the top of a three-legged pylon over the cockpit. The lower wires were attached to the frame that also carried the landing wheels and skids.

The fuselage was also steel tube-framed, reinforced with wood and covered with fabric. The forward part, with the engine, pylon and open cockpit, had four longerons and a rectangular cross-section deepest around the cockpit, producing a tubby-bellied look. Behind the cockpit, the lower longerons met to make a triangular rear cross-section, much like that of the earlier Etrich Taube's rear fuselage. A single piece rounded rudder with no fin was attached to the extreme tail. A semicircular tailplane, fitted with a pair of similarly shaped elevators, was placed well ahead of the rudder, giving it plenty of room for movement. Under the forward fuselage, a pair of skids formed the undercarriage, often straight with turned up front ends but sometimes continuously curved, connected to the fuselage by three struts. Between them and connected with elastic was a tubular axle carrying a single wheel at each end. Some aircraft (seaplanes or idro), with somewhat different dimensions, were fitted with twin floats in lieu of wheels.

== Operational history ==
One of the first flights to bring attention to the Gabardini monoplane was made in 1913, when Philip Cevasco carried two passengers non-stop from Milan to Paris in a 60 kW (80 hp) model. The following year, Landini flew from Italy to Switzerland, over Monte Rosa in the Alps, reaching a height of 3,450 m (11,320 ft) with one passenger. The next day, Desbrueres set a solo Italian altitude record at 4,950 m (16,240 ft).

The lower-powered 37 kW (50 hp) Gnôme-engined variant proved a capable single-seat trainer, and several were produced during the First World War, remaining in use from 1914 to 1918 with only a cockpit modification. It was claimed that the Cameri School produced as many pilots as all the other flight schools in Italy combined, and that their pupils had the highest survival rate.

Some "captive" Gabardini monoplanes, stripped of their engines, horizontal tails and undercarriages, were fixed to static mountings, which allowed freedom of roll and yaw to familiarize students with the feel of the controls. Motion excursion limits were set by fixed external cables.

== Specifications (37 kW (50 hp) trainer) ==
Data from Jane's Fighting Aircraft of World War I

General characteristics

- Crew: One
- Wingspan: 10 m (32 ft 10 in)
- Wing area: 18 m^{2} (190 sq ft)
- Powerplant: 1 × Gnôme rotary engine, 37 kW (50 hp)
- Propellers: 2-bladed

Performance

- Maximum speed: 100 km/h (62 mph, 54 kn) "low down""
