= Morane-Saulnier AI =

French WW1 fighter aircraft

AI (MoS.27, MoS.29 & MoS.30)
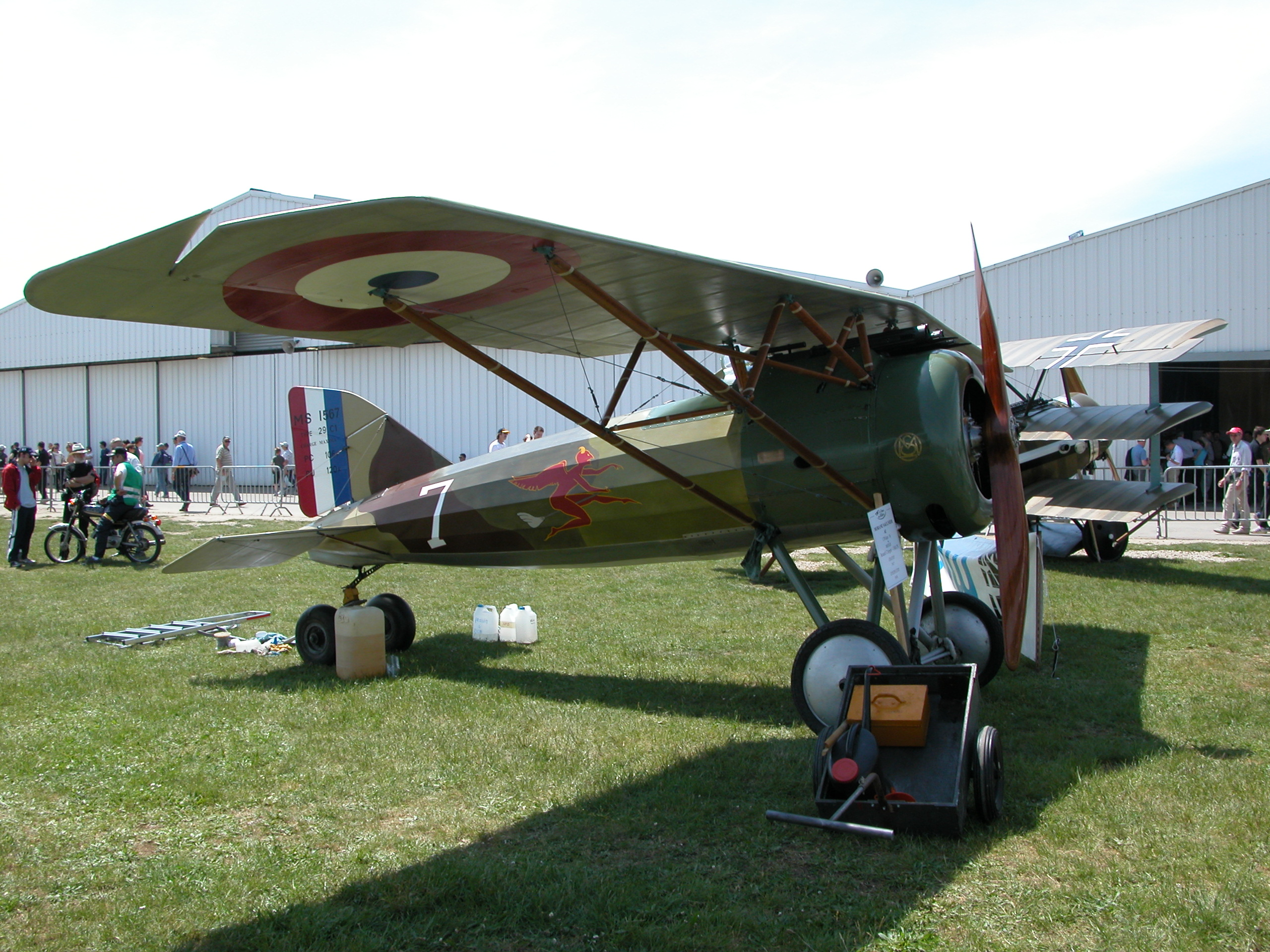

General information
- Type: fighter/trainer
- National origin: France
- Manufacturer: Morane-Saulnier
- Primary user: French Air Force
- Number built: 1210

History
- Introduction date: February 1918
- First flight: August 1917
- Developed from: Morane-Saulnier AC

The Morane-Saulnier AI (also MoS.27, MoS.29 and MoS.30) is a French parasol-wing fighter aircraft that was produced by Morane-Saulnier during World War I. (Note: Morane-Saulnier used letters for designations, while official government designations used numbers. Contemporary use was generally in Roman numerals, as MoS.XXVII, MoS.XXIX and MoS.XXX, but Arabic numerals were also used. Both MS and MoS were used interchangeably as an abbreviation of Morane-Saulnier.)

== Development and design ==
The AI evolved via the AC from the Morane-Saulnier Type N, but with a parasol wing. It had a rigidly braced wing with ailerons replacing the N's wing warping. It was intended to replace the Nieuport 17 and SPAD VII in French service, in competition against the SPAD XIII and Nieuport 28. It was ordered as a back-up for the SPAD XIII, in case the ongoing problems with its Hispano-Suiza continued to be unresolved.

Its Gnome Monosoupape 9N 120 kW (160 hp) rotary engine was mounted in the nose, in a tight fitting circular open-front cowling. The strut braced constant chord two-spar parasol wing was slightly swept back, and fitted with horn-balanced ailerons. The spars and ribs of the circular section teardrop-shaped fuselage were wood, wire-braced and covered in fabric, and faired out with wood stringers. Unlike most previous Morane-Saulnier designs, the AI's fuselage did not end in a horizontal knife edge, but rather came to a point which extended to the rear of the rudder and elevators.

Production aircraft were given service designations based on whether they had 1 Vickers machine gun (designated MoS 27), 2 Vickers guns (designated MoS 29) or none (designated MoS.30).

== Operational history ==
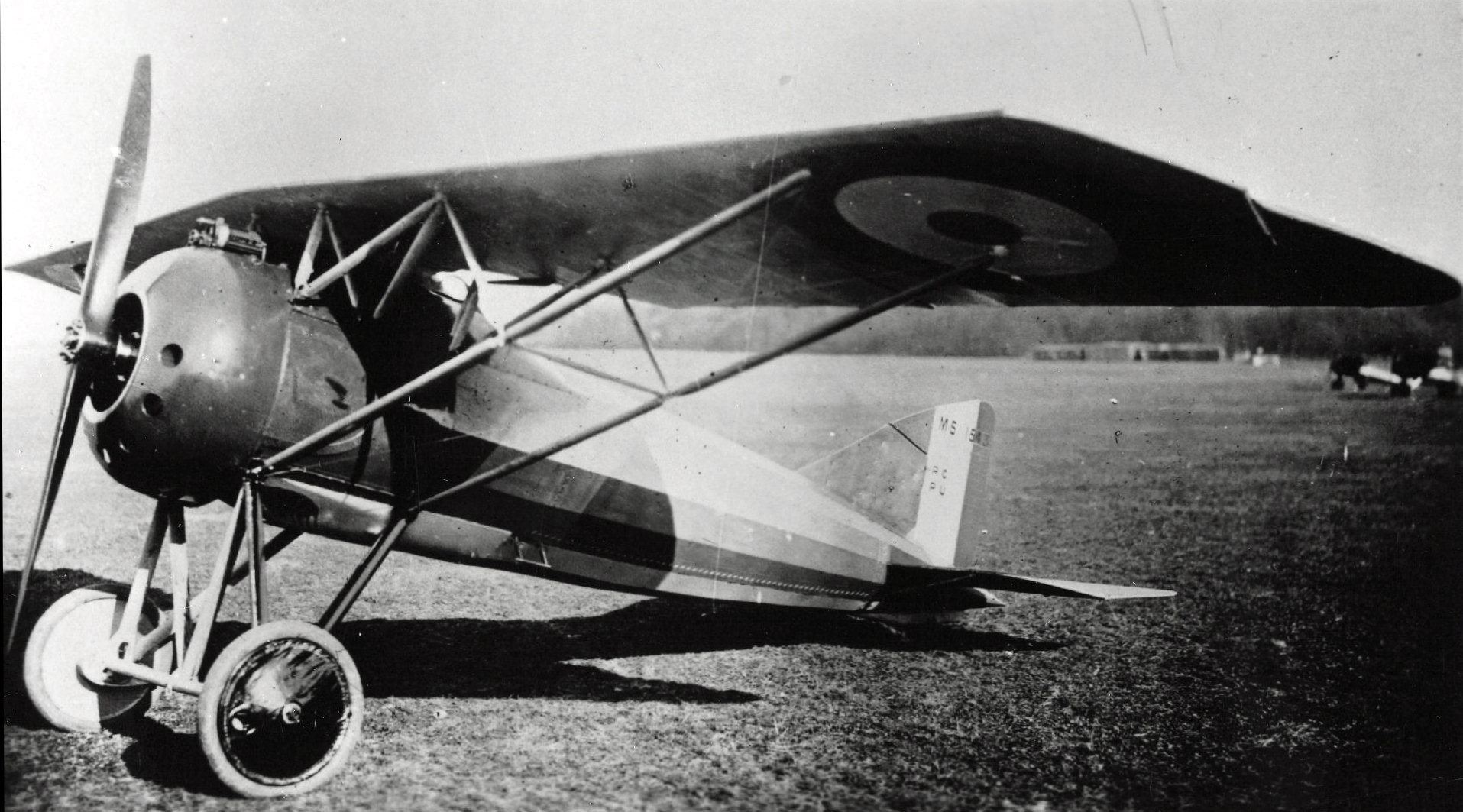
French Morane-Saulnier AI

The AI was briefly operated by a number of escadrilles from February 1918, but by mid-May 1918, most had been withdrawn from operations, and replaced by SPAD XIIIs due to structural problems. After that problem had been resolved, the aircraft were returned to service, but as advanced trainers, with new purpose-built examples being designated MoS 30 E.1. Many were used post-war after having been sold off as surplus, as aerobatic aircraft, including one which was flown by Charles Nungesser for a tour across the US.

Fifty-one MoS 30 E.1s were purchased by the American Expeditionary Force as pursuit trainers.

== Variants ==
MoS.23 C.1/AC
Rigidly-braced shoulder-wing monoplane precursor.
MoS 27 C.1
Fighter variant with one 7.7 mm (0.303 in) Vickers machine gun and powered by a 120 kW (160 hp) Gnome Monosoupape 9N or NI rotary engine.
MoS 28 C.1/AF/AFH
Biplane derivative with a 120 kW (160 hp) Gnome Monosoupape 9N rotary engine. The AFH sub-variant was fitted with floats and intended for shipboard use.
MoS 29 C.1
Fighter variant with two 7.7 mm (0.303 in) Vickers machine guns and powered by a 120 kW (160 hp) Gnome Monosoupape 9N or NI rotary engine.
MoS 30 E.1
Unarmed single seat advanced trainer with either a 90 kW (120 hp) le Rhone 9Jb or a 100 kW (130 hp) le Rhone 9Jby rotary engine.
MoS 30bis E.1
Variant of the MoS 30 with a de-rated 67 kW (90 hp) le Rhone 9Jby.

In addition one undesignated example was built with a wood monocoque fuselage, and fitted with a 130 kW (170 hp) Le Rhone 9R rotary and two 7.7 mm (0.303 in) Vickers machine guns.

Post-war, examples in civilian use were re-engined with the 100 kW (130 hp) Clerget 9Ba rotary engine in a shorter cowling.

== Operators ==
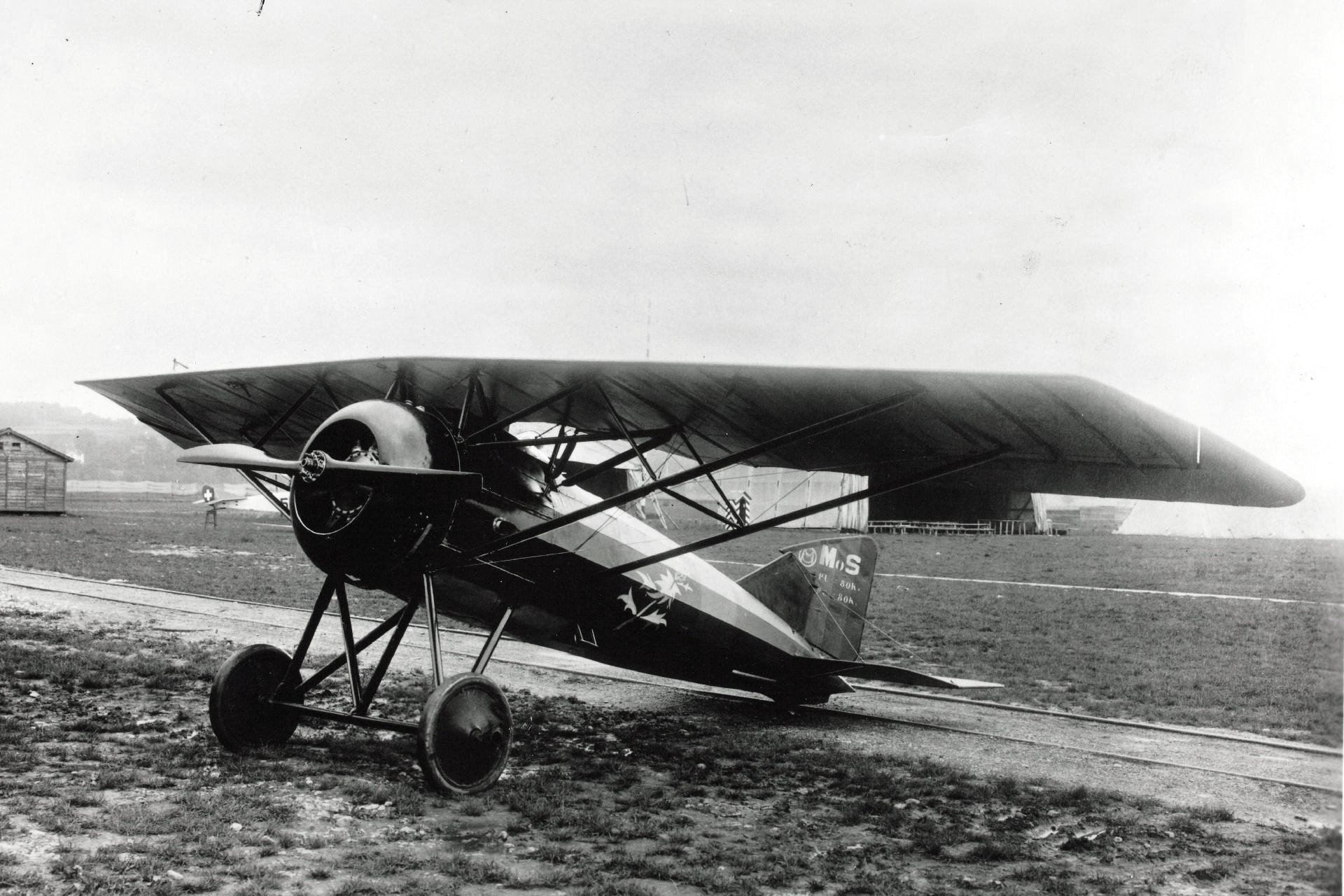
Belgian Morane-Saulnier AI

In addition to military operators, the Morane-Saulnier AI was popular with French aerobatic pilots and a number carried civil registrations.

Belgium

- Belgian Air Force

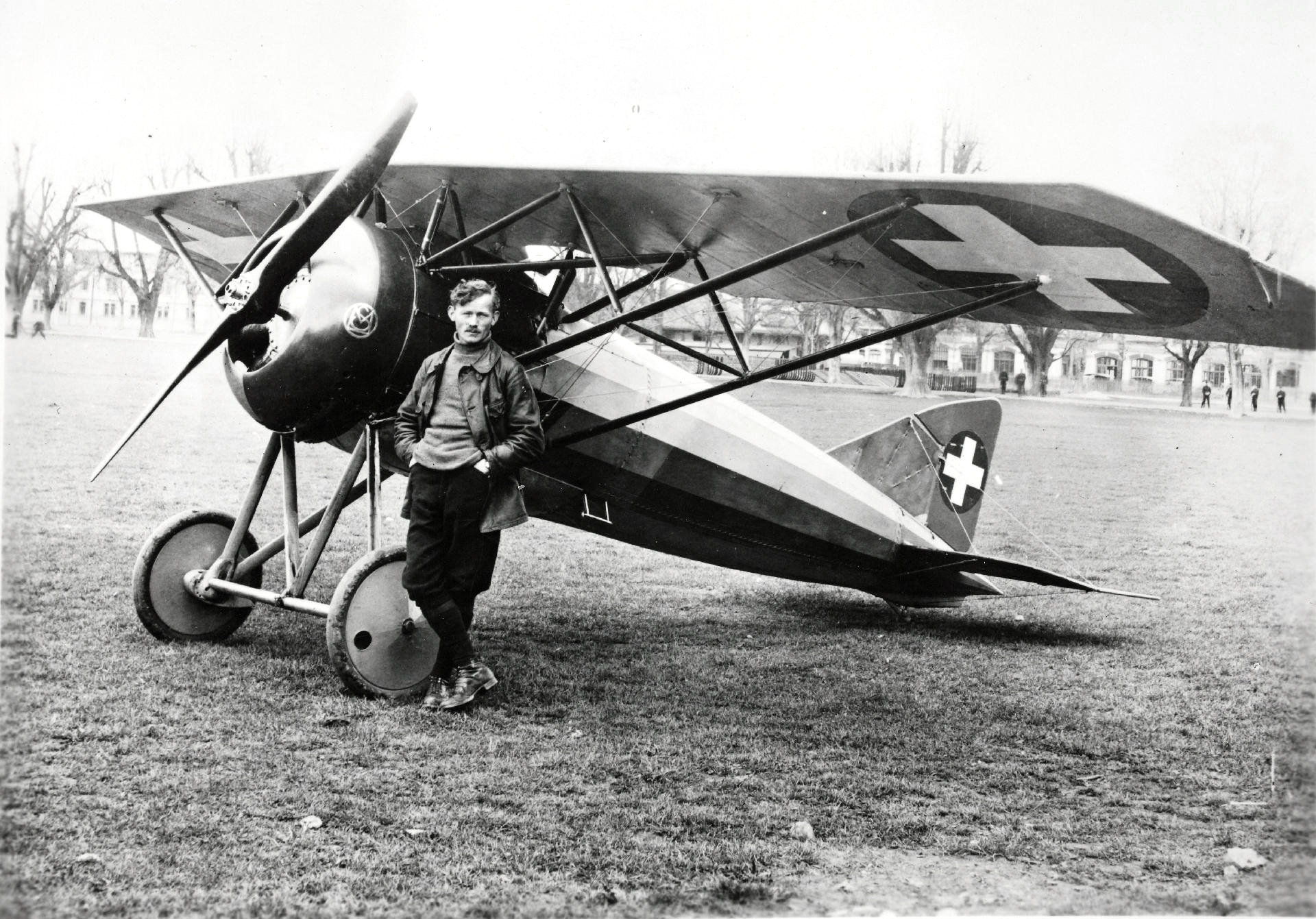
This Swiss Morane-Saulnier AI has been purchased privately from France in March 1920 by Léon Progin, a test pilot for the Swiss air force and the K+W Thun.

France

- French Air Force
  - Escadrille MS 156
  - Escadrille MS 158
  - Escadrille MS 161

Japan

- Imperial Japanese Army Air Service – evaluated a single MoS.30 in 1922.

Soviet Union

- Soviet Air Force – four aircraft, used for tests and trials.

Switzerland

- Swiss Air Force – The Morane-Saulnier AI was never formally adopted or operated as an official military asset by the Swiss Air Force (Fliegertruppe). A single Morane-Saulnier Type AI (MoS.30 E1 trainer variant) made its way to Switzerland in March 1920 when it was purchased privately from France by Léon Progin, a test pilot for the Swiss air force and a test pilot of the Eidgenössische Konstruktionswerkstätte (K+W) Thun.

United States

- American Expeditionary Force – operated 51 MoS.30 trainers.

== Surviving aircraft ==
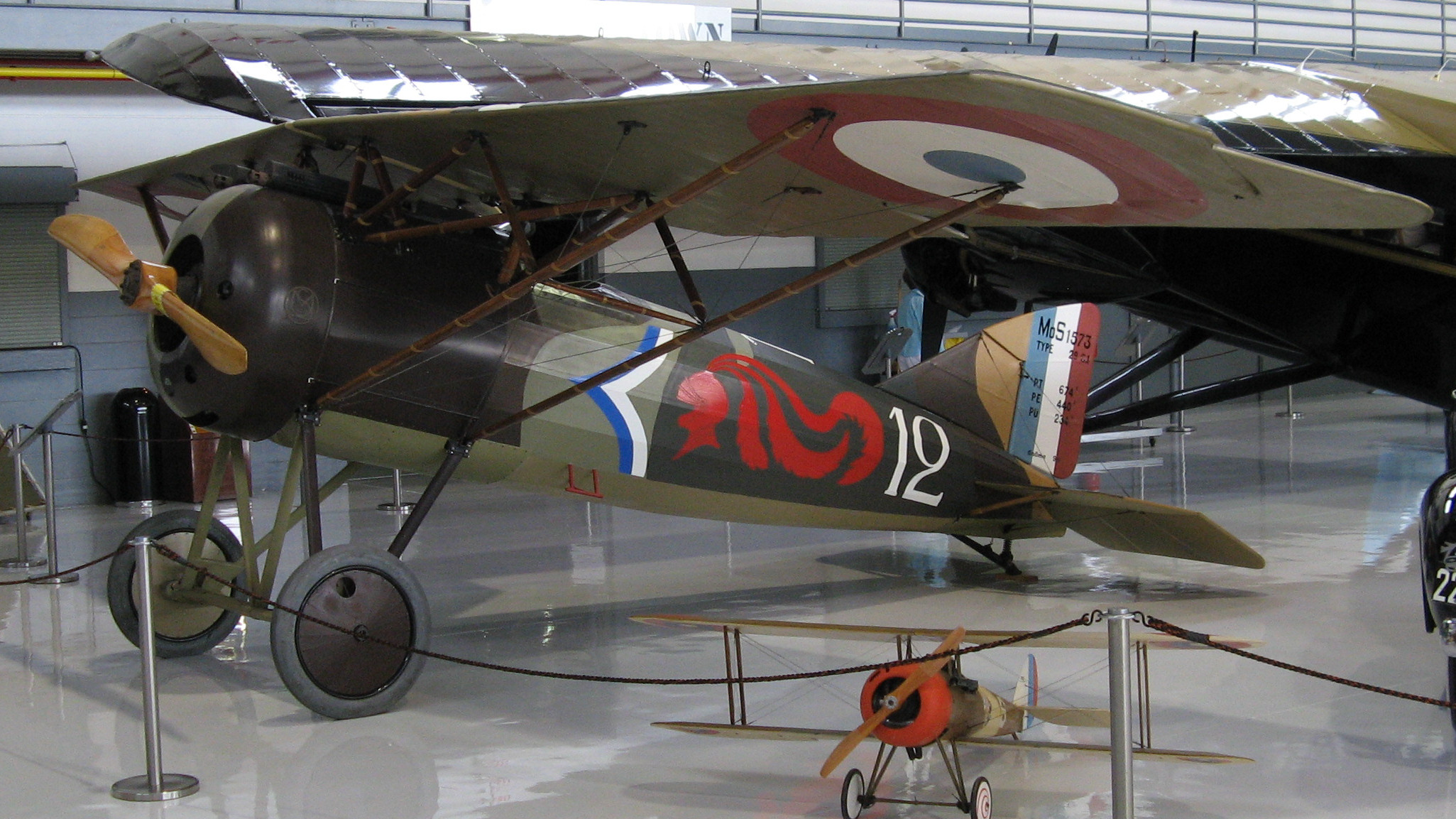
Morane-Saulnier AI at Fantasy Of Flight

Three AIs are flown from La Ferté-Alais.

The Fantasy of Flight collection in Polk City, Florida has an AI tested by the United States Army Air Service in 1918 at McCook Field in Ohio until being sold off for private use. It subsequently joined the Tallmantz Collection which was then acquired by Fantasy of Flight in 1985 and restored in the late 1980s.

Another AI, formerly flown by Charles Nungesser is at the Old Rhinebeck Aerodrome, and was flown in the weekend airshows there.

== Specifications (MoS 27 C.1, 150 hp Monosoupape) ==
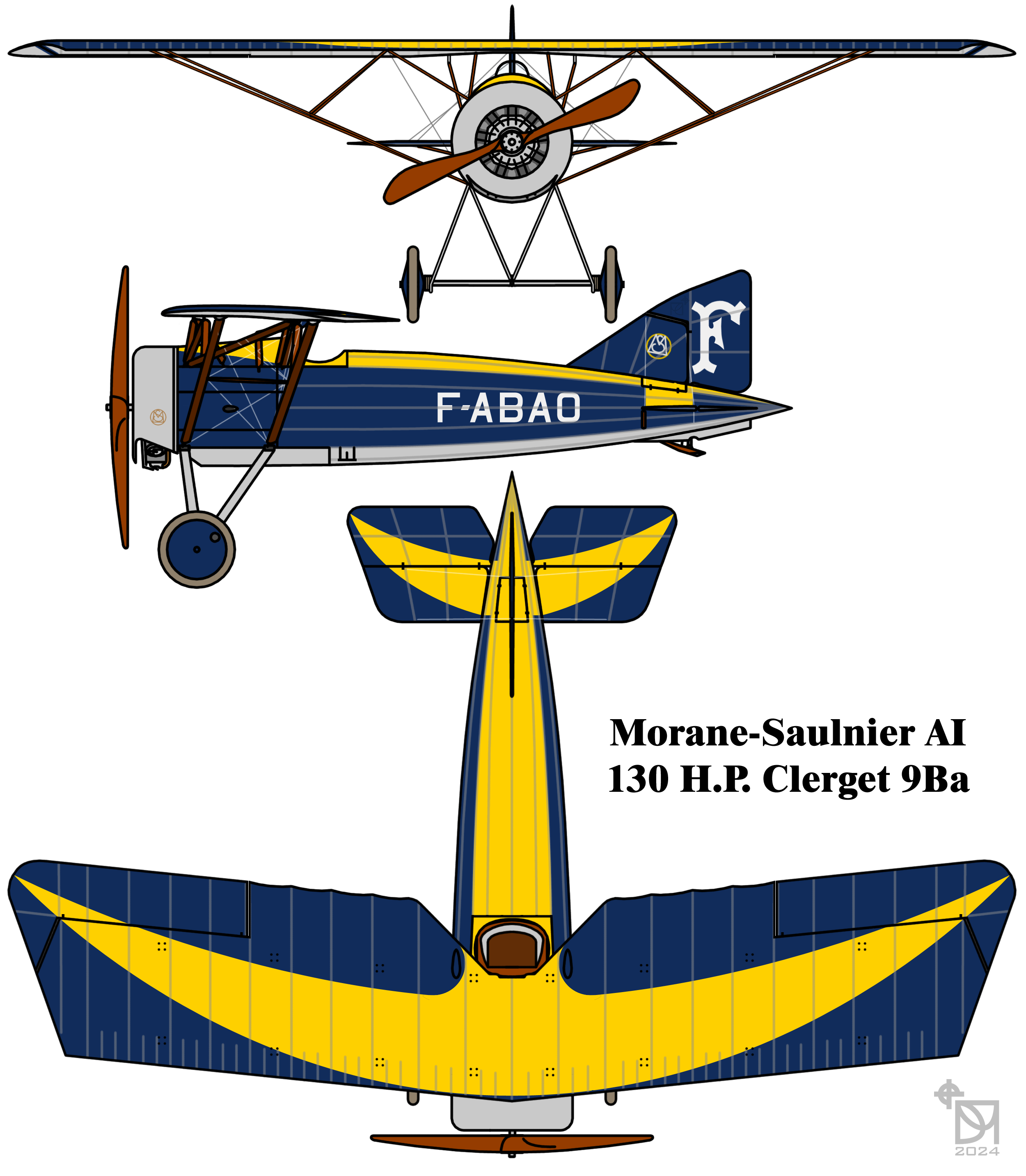
Morane-Saulnier MS.30E.1 or AI, as aerobatic aircraft

Data from War Planes of the First World War: Volume Five Fighters

General characteristics

- Crew: 1
- Length: 5.65 m (18 ft 6 in)
- Wingspan: 8.51 m (27 ft 11 in)
- Height: 2.40 m (7 ft 10 in)
- Wing area: 13.39 m^{2} (144.1 sq ft)
- Empty weight: 421 kg (928 lb)
- Gross weight: 649 kg (1,431 lb)
- Powerplant: 1 × Gnome Monosoupape 9N , 112 kW (150 hp)

Performance

- Maximum speed: 225 km/h (140 mph, 121 kn)
- Endurance: 1 hours 45 minutes
- Service ceiling: 7,000 m (23,000 ft)
- Time to altitude: 2 minutes to 1,000 m (3,300 ft)

Armament

- Guns: 1 x 7.7 mm (0.303 in) Vickers machine gun forward of cockpit, later MoS.29 had two Vickers, and the MoS.30 trainer was unarmed.

== See also ==
Aircraft of comparable role, configuration, and era

- Fokker D.VIII
- Kondor E 3
- LFG Roland D.XVI
