= RAF 2 =

- Type: Piston radial aero engine
- Manufacturer: Royal Aircraft Factory
- First run: October 1913
- Major applications: Royal Aircraft Factory B.E.8

The RAF 2 was a British air-cooled, nine-cylinder radial engine developed for aircraft use just prior to World War I; it was designed and built by the Royal Aircraft Factory.

== Applications ==
- Royal Aircraft Factory B.E.8

== Specifications (RAF 2) ==
Data from Lumsden

=== General characteristics ===
- Type: 9-cylinder, single-row, radial engine
- Bore: 3.94 in (100 mm)
- Stroke: 5.51 in (140 mm)
- Displacement: 604.6 cu in (9.9 L)

=== Components ===
- Valvetrain: Poppet valve
- Cooling system: Air-cooled
- Reduction gear: 0.563:1, geared epicyclic, right-hand tractor

=== Performance ===
- Power output: 120 hp (90 kW)
- Specific power: 0.2 hp/cu in (9.2 kW/L)

== See also ==
Related lists

- List of aircraft engines
