= BE3 =

BE3 may refer to:

- The BE3 Base Editor
- BE-3, a rocket engine from Blue Origin
- Royal Aircraft Factory B.E.3, a 1912 aircraft
- Bracuí (D-23, U-31, Be-3), a Brazilian destroyer escort warship previously known as USS Reybold (DE-177)
- Virgin Media Three, a television channel within the Republic of Ireland formally known as be3.
- BE3 (#BE3), shortcut for Bethesda + E3, hashtag for Bethesda's panel on Electronic Entertainment Expo
- The EU NUTS I statistical region denoting Wallonia in Belgium
