= Royal Aircraft Factory S.E.2 =

S.E.2
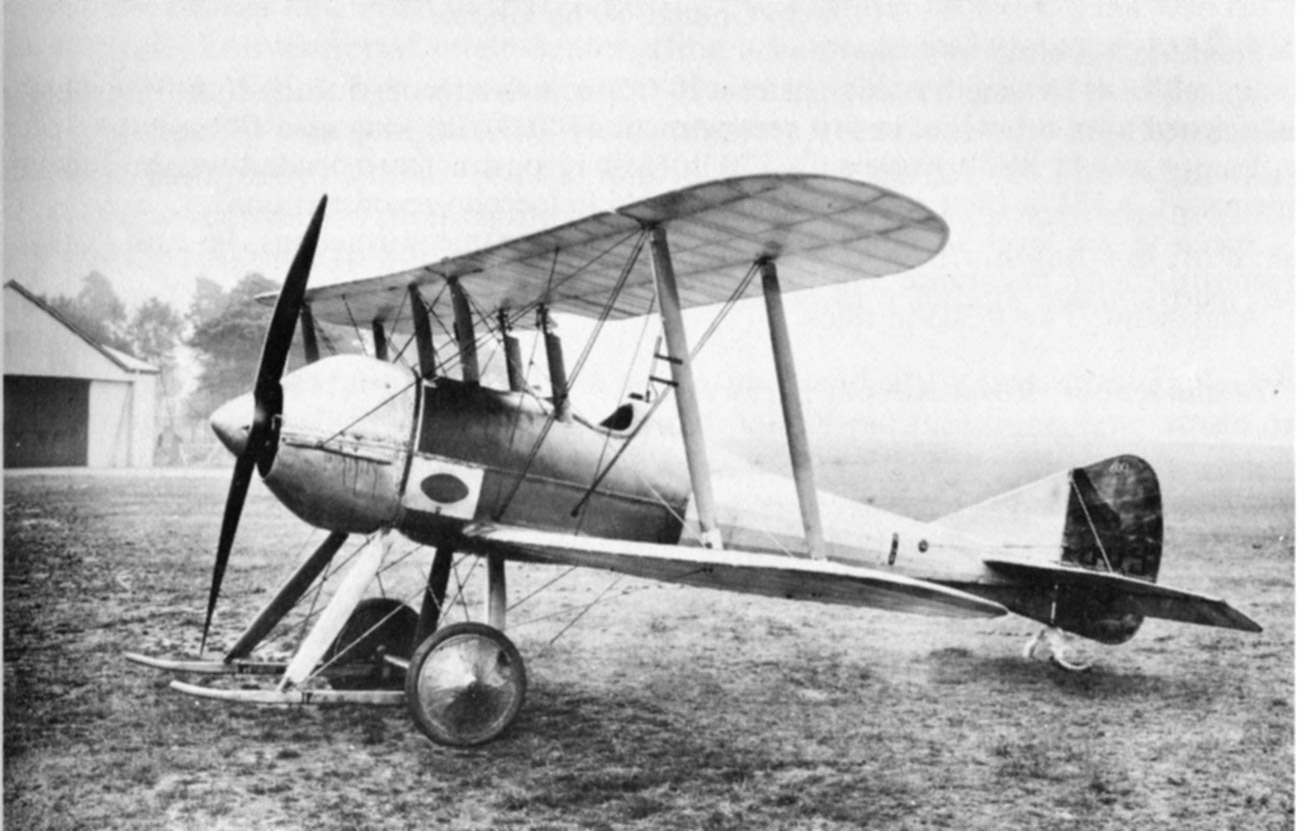
- The S.E.2 in its final form, at the Royal Aircraft Factory, Farnborough

General information
- Type: Scout aircraft
- National origin: United Kingdom
- Manufacturer: Royal Aircraft Factory
- Designer: Geoffrey de Havilland (B.S.1)
- Primary user: Royal Flying Corps
- Number built: 1

History
- Introduction date: 1914
- First flight: March 1913
- Retired: 1915

The Royal Aircraft Factory S.E.2 (Scout Experimental) was an early British single-seat scout aircraft. Designed and built at the Royal Aircraft Factory in 1912–13 as the B.S.1, the prototype was rebuilt several times before serving with the Royal Flying Corps over the Western Front in the early months of the First World War.

== Development and design ==
In 1912, a team at the Royal Aircraft Factory, led by Geoffrey de Havilland, started design of a single seat scout, or fast reconnaissance aircraft, the first aircraft in the world specifically designed for this role. The design was a small tractor biplane, and was named the B.S.1 (standing for Blériot Scout) after Louis Blériot, a pioneer of tractor configuration aircraft. It had a wooden monocoque circular section fuselage, and single-bay wings. Lateral control was by wing warping, while the aircraft was initially fitted with a small rudder without a fixed fin (a scaled down version of that fitted to the B.E.3), and a one-piece elevator. It was powered by a two-row, 14-cylinder Gnome rotary engine rated at 100 hp (75 kW).

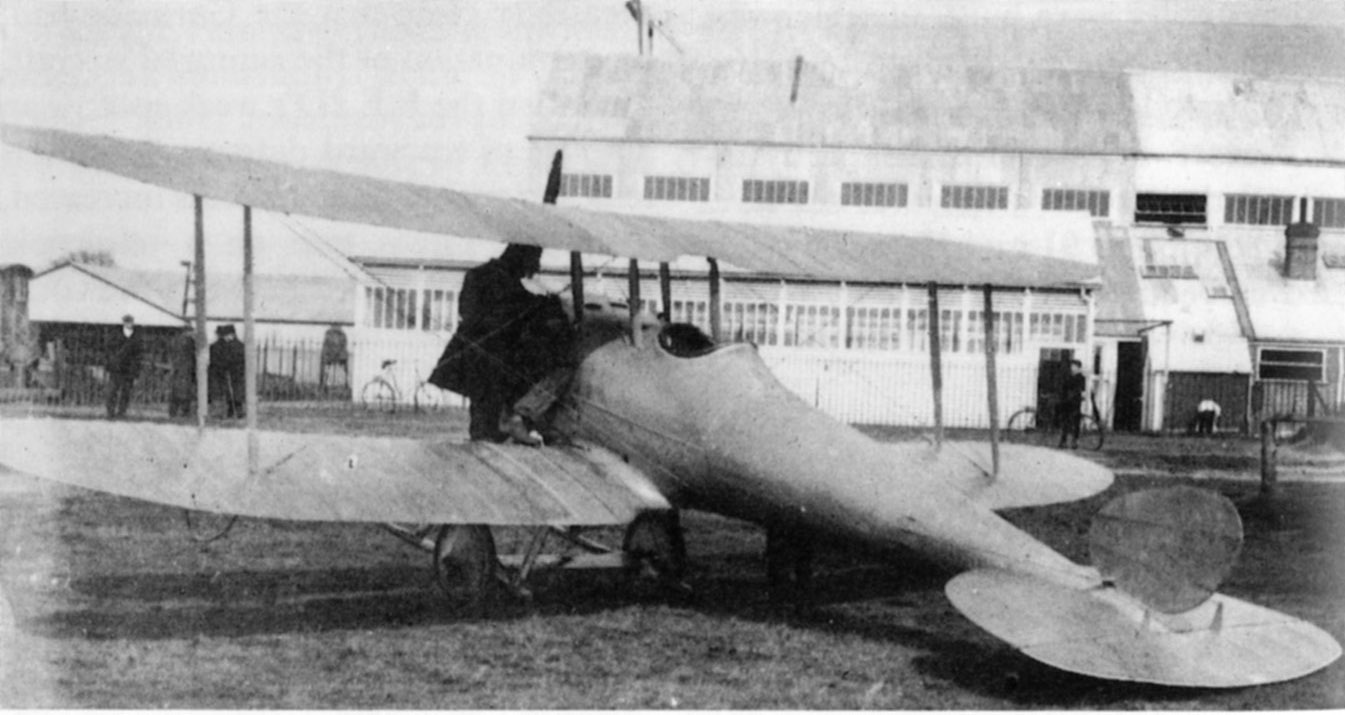
The Royal Aircraft B.S.1 in its original form

The B.S.1 was first flown by Geoffrey de Havilland early in 1913, demonstrating excellent performance, with a maximum speed of 91.7 mph (147.6 km/h), a stalling speed of 51 mph (82 km/h) and a rate of climb of 900 ft/min (4.6 m/s), despite the engine only delivering about 82 hp (61 kW) instead of the promised 100 hp. De Havilland was not satisfied with the control afforded by the small rudder and designed a larger replacement, but on 27 March 1913, before the new rudder could be installed, he crashed the B.S.1, breaking his jaw and badly damaging the aircraft.

Following this accident, it was rebuilt, with an 80 hp single-row Gnome and new tail surfaces, with triangular fins above and below the fuselage, a larger rudder and conventional divided elevators. While the rebuilt aircraft was initially designated B.S.2, it was soon redesignated S.E.2 (for Scout Experimental). It was flown in this form by de Havilland in October 1913.

In April 1914, the S.E.2 was again rebuilt, this time under the supervision of Henry Folland, as de Havilland had left the Royal Aircraft Factory to become chief designer of Airco (the B.S.1/S.E.2 was the last design de Havilland produced for the Factory). The tail surfaces were again revised, with a larger fin and rudder, with new tailplane and elevators. The monocoque rear fuselage, which had been criticised as too expensive for mass production, was replaced by a conventional wood and fabric structure. Better streamlined struts were fitted, as well as streamline sectioned bracing wires (Raf-wires). It was first flown in this form on 3 October 1914. This modified version is often referred to as the "S.E.2a" - this designation was not used at the time, and was probably not official.

== Operational history ==
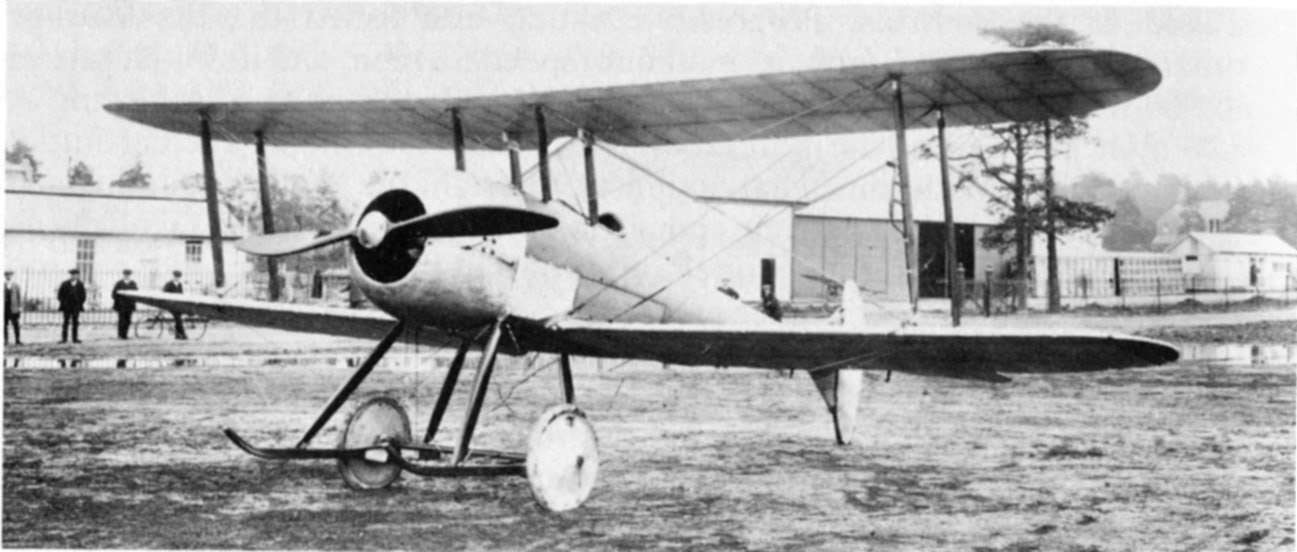
The Royal Aircraft Factory S.E.2 in about October 1913 - after its reconstruction from the B.S.1 and before its final rebuild

The S.E.2 was handed over the Royal Flying Corps on 17 February 1914, with the serial number 609 being issued to No. 5 Squadron, where it made a good impression, and then to No. 3 Squadron before being returned to the Royal Aircraft Factory in April.

By the time the rebuilt "S.E.2a" version was completed, the First World War had broken out, and the modified S.E.2 was sent across the English Channel to join No. 3 Squadron on 27 October. It was fitted with an improvised armament of a pair of rifles mounted on the side of the fuselage, angled outwards to avoid the propeller, together with the pilot's revolver. It was one of the fastest aircraft available in the early months of the war, with it being said that: "Its speed enabled it to circle around the enemy machines and gave it a decided ascendancy." It remained in use with 3 Squadron until March 1915, when it was damaged by an exploding bomb and was sent back to England. It was struck off charge and its subsequent fate is unknown.

== Operators ==
United Kingdom

- Royal Flying Corps
  - No. 3 Squadron RFC
  - No. 5 Squadron RFC

== Specifications (S.E.2 - after first rebuild) ==
Data from The Aeroplanes of the Royal Flying Corps (Military Wing)

General characteristics

- Crew: 1
- Length: 20 ft 10 in (6.35 m)
- Wingspan: 27 ft 6 1/4 in (8.388 m)
- Height: 9 1/8 ft (2.8 m)
- Wing area: 188 sq ft (17.5 m^{2})
- Aspect ratio: 4.03
- Empty weight: 720 lb (327 kg)
- Gross weight: 1,132 lb (513 kg)
- Powerplant: 1 × Gnome rotary engine, 80 hp (60 kW)

Performance

- Maximum speed: 91 mph (146 km/h, 79 kn)
- Endurance: 3 hr

Armament

- Guns: 2× .303 in rifles

== See also ==
Aircraft of comparable role, configuration, and era

- Royal Aircraft Factory S.E.4
- Bristol Scout
- Sopwith Tabloid

Related lists

- List of aircraft of the Royal Flying Corps
