= Royal Aircraft Factory F.E.6 =

General information
- Type: Biplane
- National origin: United Kingdom
- Manufacturer: Royal Aircraft Factory

History
- Developed from: Royal Aircraft Factory F.E.3

The Royal Aircraft Factory F.E.6 was a two-bay, single-engine pusher biplane built by the British Royal Aircraft Factory, a larger version of their F.E.3.

== Design and development ==
The F.E.6 was a larger version of their F.E.3. The aircraft was driven by a 120 hp (89 kW) Austro-Daimler/Beardmore engine, which drove a four-bladed propeller. The tail unit was on a single steel boom which projected aft through the propeller shaft. The biplane had ailerons on both upper and lower wings, with no wing stagger, while landing gear consisted of mainwheels on oleo struts with an auxiliary nosewheel. It was possibly armed with a 6-pound Davis recoilless weapon, or the Coventry Ordnance Works COW 37 mm gun. However, the aircraft was damaged upon landing during its first flight, and was subsequently not rebuilt.

== Specifications ==
Data from The British Fighter Since 1912

General characteristics

- Length: 8.99 m (29 ft 6 in)
- Wingspan: 15.04 m (49 ft 4 in)
- Height: 4.6 m (15 ft)
- Wing area: 50.4 m^{2} (542 sq ft)
- Empty weight: 907 kg (2,000 lb)
- Powerplant: 1 × Austro-Daimler/Beardmore , 89 kW (120 hp)
- Propellers: 4-bladed
