= BE-4 (disambiguation) =

BE-4 or Blue Engine 4 is a rocket engine under development by Blue Origin.

Be-4 or Be4 may also refer to:

- Beriev Be-4, a Soviet reconnaissance flying boat
- Royal Aircraft Factory B.E.4, a pre-World War I British biplane
- Comandante Bauru (D-18, U-28, Be-4), a Brazilian destroyer escort warship previously known as USS McAnn (DE-179)
