= Royal Aircraft Factory H.R.E.2 =

H.R.E.2
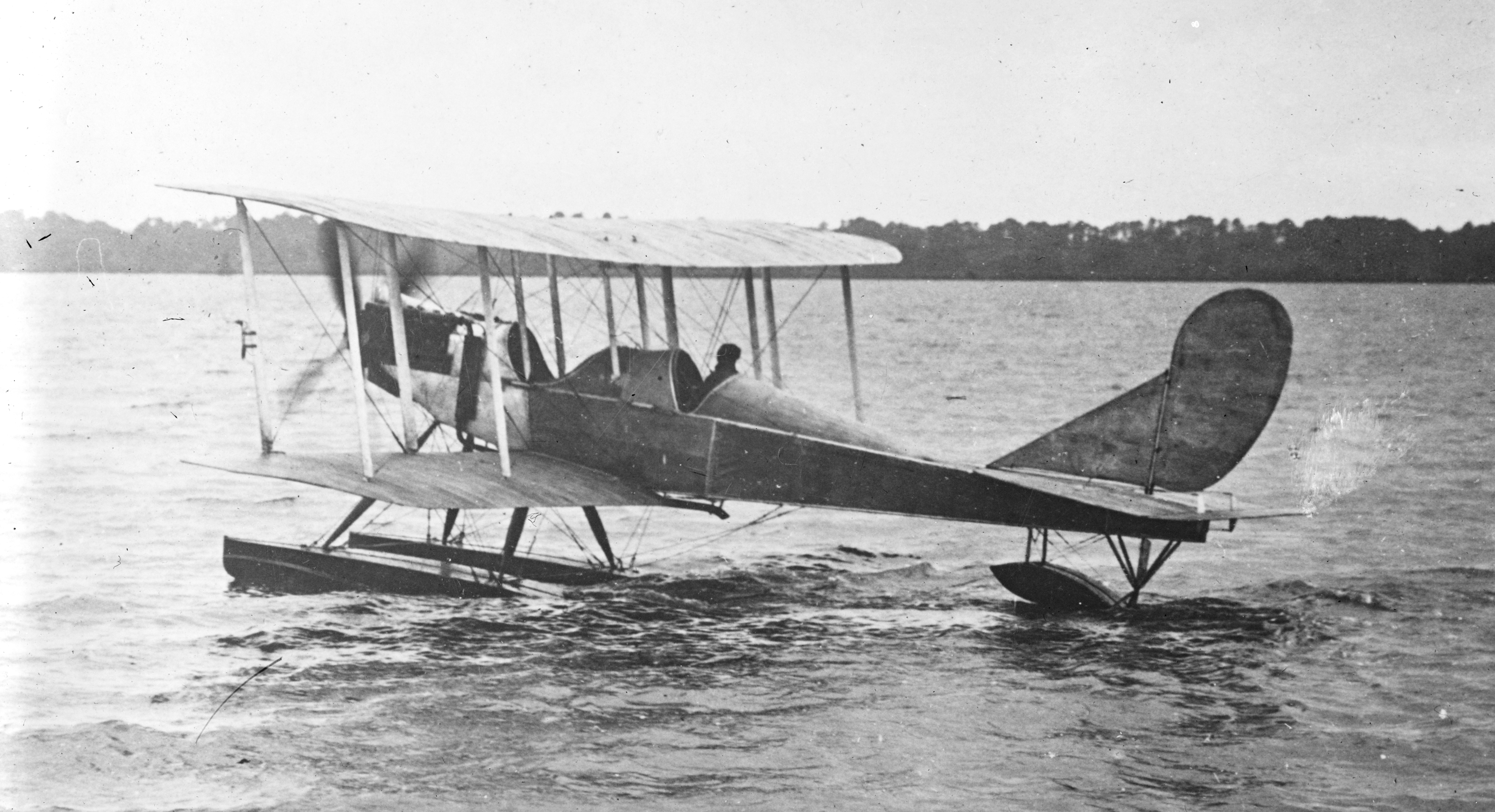

General information
- Type: Naval reconnaissance seaplane
- National origin: United Kingdom
- Manufacturer: Royal Aircraft Factory
- Primary user: Royal Naval Air Service
- Number built: 1

History
- First flight: 1913

The Royal Aircraft Factory H.R.E.2 was intended as a Naval reconnaissance floatplane. The single example built was serving with the Royal Naval Air Service at the start of World War I.

== Design and development ==
The H.R.E.2 was the second aircraft designed by the Royal Aircraft Factory under its Reconnaissance Experimental designation. This team was headed by Chief Engineer Fred Green, but details were by John Kenworthy, who had designed the derivatives of the B.E.3, The H stood for hydroplane (sea- or float plane), for the specification came from the Air Department of the Admiralty for the Naval Wing of the R.F.C. It was a two-bay biplane with staggered wings of equal span and equal, constant chord. Lateral control was by wing warping. The fuselage was flat sided with a deep, rounded decking similar to that of the earlier R.E.1, though the front cockpit was much longer and more open-sided in the later aircraft. The pilot sat behind, just aft of the wing trailing edge; there was no cut-out for visibility. The elevator and tailplane were both single-piece surfaces.

Though it was intended as a floatplane powered by a 100 hp (75 kW) 12-cylinder Renault engine, it initially flew as a landplane with the smaller 70 hp Renault air-cooled upright V-8 as used in the R.E.1. In this configuration the rudder was mounted above and clear of the tail plane, leaving room for the one piece elevators and having the same shape, roughly a flattened oval with its long axis parallel with the fuselage, as that of the B.E.3. The landplane version was often referred to as the R.E.2.

The floats of the H.R.E.2 were fitted at the same time as the more powerful engine. They were typical of the time: a pair of main short floats were mounted to the fuselage by two pairs of struts, those at the front sloping back to around the engine bulkhead and the aft pair running vertically to the point where the front wing spar joined the fuselage. The aircraft sat tail down in the water, the rear supported by a third small double float. A triangular fin was fitted and a new teardrop-shaped rudder, cropped at the bottom, mounted on it. The elevator hinge was near the trailing edge of the rudder, giving the elevator clearance to move. The fin and rudder design was essentially repeated on the later R.E.3. The aircraft was seriously damaged in an attempted take off from Frensham Pond and then rebuilt as a landplane once again, fitted with ailerons rather than wing warping. It kept the revised fin and rudder and had a two-wheeled, single-axle undercarriage mounted on two longitudinal members that projected forwards to form "hockey stick" anti-nose-over skids like those of the B.E.1. In this form it served with the Royal Naval Air Service (RNAS) as aircraft no.17 and was still in service at the start of World War I. It was wrecked in a crash on 10 February 1915.

== Specifications ==
Data from Thetford 1958, p. 370

General characteristics

- Crew: 2
- Length: 32 ft 3 in (9.83 m)
- Wingspan: 45 ft 3.5 in (13.80 m)
- Height: 12 ft 2 in (3.71 m)
- Powerplant: 1 × Renault V-12 , 100 hp (75 kW)
- Maximum speed: 60 mph (97 km/h, 52 kn)
