= Royal Aircraft Factory F.E.10 =

Royal Aircraft Factory aircraft

General information
- Type: Fighter aircraft
- National origin: British
- Manufacturer: Royal Aircraft Factory

The Royal Aircraft Factory F.E.10 (Farman Experimental No. 10) was an aircraft designed by John Kenworthy, Henry P. Folland, and Maj. Frank W. Goodden in June 1916. The design placed the pilot and a machine gun in front of the aircraft's propeller, which was in a nacelle braced between the undercarriage and the upper wing. It was to have been powered by a 150 hp (110 kW) Hispano-Suiza 8 engine, placed between the wings.

== Specifications ==
General characteristics

- Powerplant: 1 × Hispano-Suiza V8, 110 kW (150 hp)
