= Royal Aircraft Establishment =

Defunct aerospace research organization and aircraft manufacturer

- Farnborough, Hampshire
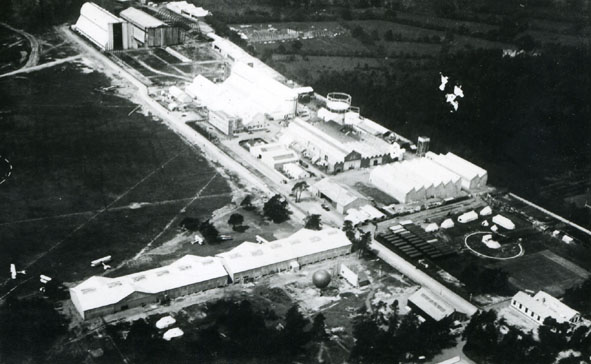
- Royal Aircraft Factory (RAF) c.1915

Site information
- Type: Research establishment
- Owner: War Office (1904–1906); Ministry of Defence (1964–1991)
- Controlled by: British Army (1904–1906)

Location
- Coordinates: 51.279475°N 0.787926°W

Site history
- In use: 1905–1991
- Battles/wars: First World War; Second World War; Cold War

The Royal Aircraft Establishment (RAE) was a British research establishment, known by several different names during its history, that eventually came under the aegis of the UK Ministry of Defence (MoD), before finally losing its identity in mergers with other institutions.

The British Army Balloon Factory was established on Farnborough Common in 1905. By 1912, it had come under civilian control and was the Royal Aircraft Factory (RAF). In 1918, it was renamed Royal Aircraft Establishment to prevent confusion with the newly created Royal Air Force. The first site was at Farnborough Airfield ("RAE Farnborough") in Hampshire to which was added a second site RAE Bedford (Bedfordshire) in 1946.

On 1 May 1988, it was renamed the Royal Aerospace Establishment (RAE) before merging with other research entities to become part of the new Defence Research Agency in 1991.

== History ==
The Royal Aircraft Establishment was originally founded as the Army Balloon Factory in 1905. Between 1905–1906, the Army Balloon Factory, which was part of the Army School of Ballooning, under the command of Colonel James Templer, relocated from Aldershot to the edge of Farnborough Common in order to have enough space to inflate the new "dirigible balloon" or airship which was then under construction. Templer's place was taken by Colonel John Capper and Templer himself retired in 1908. Besides balloons and airships, the factory also experimented with Samuel Franklin Cody's war kites and aeroplanes designed both by Cody and J. W. Dunne. In October 1908, Cody made the first aeroplane flight in the United Kingdom at Farnborough.

In 1909, Army work on aeroplanes ceased and the Factory was brought under civilian control. Capper was replaced as Superintendent by Mervyn O'Gorman. In 1912, the Balloon Factory was renamed the Royal Aircraft Factory (RAF). By this point, the organisation was focused on the construction and evaluation of new aircraft and aero engines of both domestic and foreign origins. During the First World War, the RAF played a leading role in implementing new manufacturing, testing and inspection standards for both aircraft and various associated apparatus, ranging from anemometers to gear boxes, lighting, and aero engines.

The RAF's first new designer was Geoffrey de Havilland, who subsequently founded his own company. Later colleagues included John Kenworthy who became chief engineer and designer at the Austin Motor Company in 1918 and who went on to found the Redwing Aircraft Co in 1930 and Henry Folland – later chief designer at Gloster Aircraft Company, and founder of his own company Folland Aircraft. One of the designers in the engine department was Samuel Heron, who later went on to invent the sodium-filled poppet valve, instrumental in achieving greater power levels from piston engines. While at the RAF, Heron designed a radial engine that he was not able to build during his time there, however upon leaving the RAF he then went to Siddeley-Deasy where the design, the RAF.8, was developed as the Jaguar. Heron later moved to the United States where he worked on the design of the Wright Whirlwind. Other engineers included Major F. M. Green, G. S. Wilkinson, James E. "Jimmy" Ellor, Prof. A .H. Gibson, and A. A. Griffith. Both Ellor and Griffith would later go on to work for Rolls-Royce Limited.

In 1918, the Royal Aircraft Factory was once more renamed, becoming the Royal Aircraft Establishment (RAE) to avoid confusion with the Royal Air Force, which was formed on 1 April 1918, and because it had relinquished its manufacturing role to concentrate on research related to improving performance, safety and reliability across the field of aeronautics.

Activities undertaken during the interwar period by the RAE included the creation of professional scientific and engineering qualifications for aeronautics. In the 1920s, the organisation was heavily involved in the testing of theories relating to aerofoil and airscrew designs, which included the use of wind tunnels. In support of this work, the RAE's first specialised wind tunnel building was completed in 1920; further wind tunnels would be commissioned in the 1930s and 1950s. Another study area was high altitude flight, for which the RAE helped to develop heated pressurised flight suits and onboard oxygen supply systems for pilots; this research would continue into the Cold War era. Another area of research around the 1920s was spin behaviour, with the aim of reducing the accident rate caused by loss of control from spinning; this work included low-altitude flight trials. In 1932, a deep wave tank for testing the hulls of seaplanes and flying boats was completed.

The RAE was also involved in early work on jet propulsion; in 1926, A. A. Griffith published a RAE report proposing the use of a gas turbine as a new power plant, experiments were conduced by the RAE to verify this theory, including the testing of a single-stage turbine in 1929. The RAE also introduced increasingly sophisticated test rigs for performing structural testing, evaluating aspects such as torsion forces, materials limits and manufacturing techniques. Other areas of research included navigation lighting, improved magnetos and ignition units for engines, and electric heaters for guns.

During the Second World War, the Marine Aircraft Experimental Establishment, which had moved from Felixstowe to a safer location at Helensburgh in Scotland, was placed under the control of the RAE. One influential innovation produced the RAE that was deployed during the conflict was its aerial reconnaissance techniques and technologies, such as the F.24 camera, which was frequently fitted to Supermarine Spitfires, de Havilland Mosquitos and other RAF aircraft. Another key breakthrough, made by Beatrice "Tilly" Shilling at the RAE, was Miss Shilling's orifice, which resolved a major issue with the Rolls-Royce Merlin engine that caused it to reduce power or even cut out in negative-G combat conditions. The Establishment was also involved in the design and testing of various features for aircraft carriers, including catapults, arrestor gear, barrier systems, and the angled flight decks.

In 1946, work began to convert RAF Thurleigh into RAE Bedford. Engineers at the Royal Aircraft Establishment invented high strength carbon fibre in 1963. In 1957, a centrifuge was commissioned to simulate high G-forces present during the flight of modern jet aircraft. The RAE were heavily involved in the testing of ejector seats (both on the ground and from modified aircraft) and, via a decompression chamber, evaluated emergency procedures related to pressurisation loss.

The RAE were particularly interested in runway performance; during the late 1940s, the Flexible Deck Research Programme involved an experimental rubber deck being trialled at Farnborough. In 1961, the world's first grooved runway for reduced aquaplaning was constructed. In 1965, a US delegation visited to view the new surfacing practice, which cumulated in a study performed by the Federal Aviation Administration and NASA.

On 1 May 1988, the RAE was renamed the Royal Aerospace Establishment. On 1 April 1991, the RAE was merged into the Defence Research Agency (DRA), the Ministry of Defence's (MOD) newly-formed research organisation. Then, on 1 April 1995, the DRA and other MOD organisations merged to form the Defence Evaluation and Research Agency (DERA). The Bedford site was largely shut down in 1994. In 2001, DERA was part-privatised by the MOD, resulting in two separate organisations, the state-owned Defence Science and Technology Laboratory (DSTL), and the privatised limited company QinetiQ.

Aircraft

The unit used various aircraft such as : Hawker Hunter, English Electric Canberra B.6 WK163 & B.6 WH953, BAC One-Eleven Series 402 XX919, Hawker Siddeley HS.125 XW930, and Douglas Dakota ZA947. During February 1988, the last Westland Wessex left after 30 years of trials work.

== Royal Aircraft Factory ==
=== Aircraft Factory designs ===
Between 1911 and 1918, the Royal Aircraft Factory produced a number of aircraft designs. Most of these were essentially research aircraft, but several actually went into quantity production, especially during the First World War. Some orders were met by the factory itself, but the bulk of production was by private British companies, some of which had not previously built aircraft.

Up to about 1913 the designation letters referred to the general layout of the aircraft, derived from a French manufacturer or designer famous for that type:

- S.E. = Santos Experimental (Canard or tail-first layout)
- B.E. = Blériot Experimental (Tractor or propeller-first layout)
- F.E. = Farman Experimental (Pusher or propeller behind the pilot layout)

From 1913/4 onwards this was changed to a designation based on the role for which the aircraft was designed:

- A.E. = Armed or Armoured Experimental
- C.E. = Coastal Experimental (e.g. Royal Aircraft Factory C.E.1 – prototype only)
- F.E. = Fighting experimental (although they remained "Farmans" in the sense of being pushers)
- N.E. = Night Experimental (e.g. Royal Aircraft Factory N.E.1 – prototype only)
- R.E. = Reconnaissance experimental (two-seat machines)
- S.E. = Scout experimental fast single-seat aircraft.

The B.S.1 of 1913 was a one-off anomaly, combining both systems: Blériot (tractor) Scout (fighter).

R.T. & T.E. were also used for strictly one-off prototypes.

=== Designs produced ===
Several aircraft were produced during the days as the Army Balloon Factory. These include the airships as well as the Cody and Dunne designs.

Subsequent Royal Aircraft Factory type designations are inconsistent and confusing. For instance the "F.E.2" designation refers to three quite distinct types, with only the same broad layout in common, the F.E.2 (1911), the F.E.2 (1913), and finally the famous wartime two-seat fighter and general-purpose design, the F.E.2 (1914). This last aircraft was the one that went into production and had three main variants, the F.E.2a, F.E.2b, and the F.E.2d. As if this wasn't enough, there is the F.E.2c; this was a generic description rather than a subtype proper, and refers to several one-off conversions of F.E.2b's that experimentally reversed the seating positions of the pilot and the observer.

The B.E.1 was basically the prototype for the early B.E.2 but the B.E.2c was almost a completely new aeroplane, with very little common with the earlier B.E.2 types apart from engine and fuselage. On the other hand, the B.E.3 to the B.E.7 were all effectively working prototypes for the B.E.8 and were all very similar in design, with progressive minor modifications of the kind that many aircraft undergo during a production run. The B.E.8a was at least as different from the B.E.8 as the B.E.7 was.

The S.E.4a had nothing in common at all with the S.E.4, while the S.E.5a was simply a late production S.E.5 with a more powerful engine.

Several early RAF designs were officially "reconstructions" of existing aircraft because the Factory did not initially have official authority to build aircraft to their own design. In most cases, the type in question used no parts whatever from the wreck, in some cases, not even the engine.

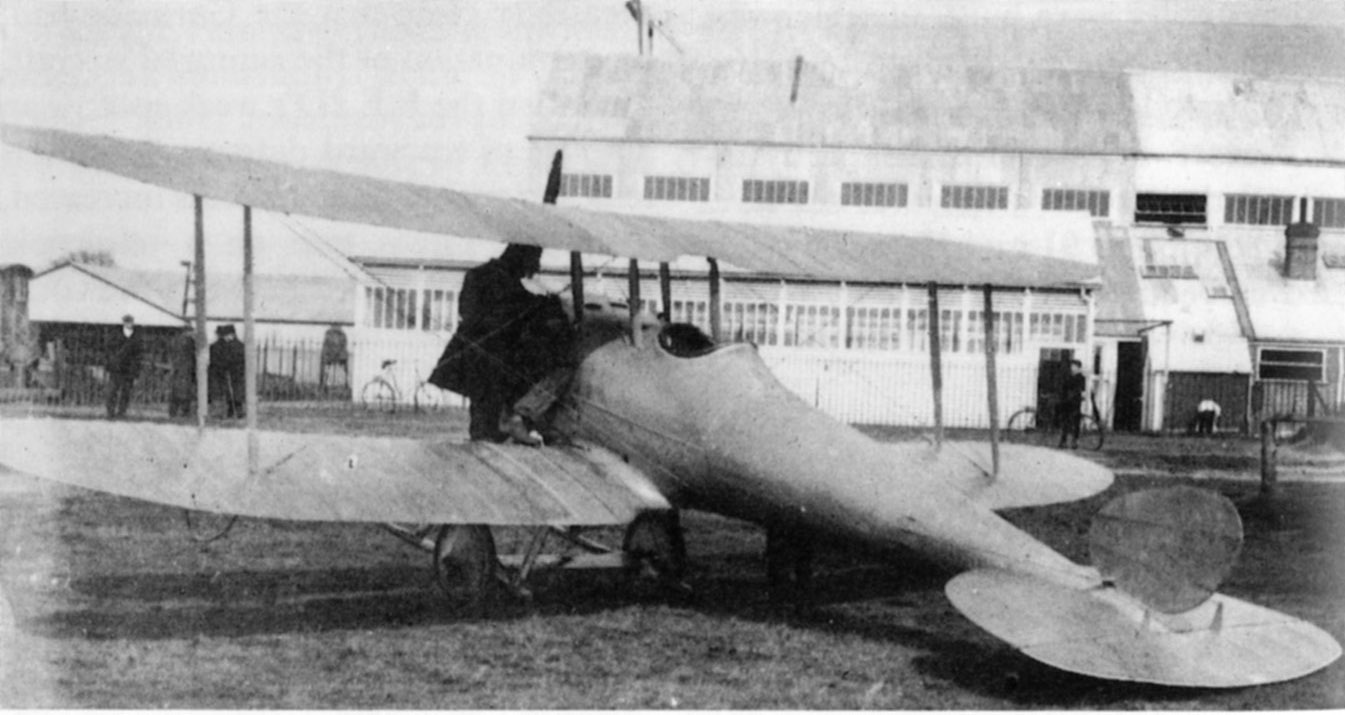
Royal Aircraft Factory B.S.1 in 1913

- British Army Dirigible No 1 Nulli Secundus—1907
- Nulli Secundus II—1908
- British Army airship Beta – 1910
- Dunne D.1 – 1907
- British Army Aeroplane No 1 (Cody) – 1908
- Dunne D.3
- Dunne D.4
- Royal Aircraft Factory S.E.1—1911
- Royal Aircraft Factory F.E.1—1911
- Royal Aircraft Factory B.E.1—1911
- Royal Aircraft Factory B.E.2—1912
- Royal Aircraft Factory B.E.3—1912
- Royal Aircraft Factory B.E.4—1912
- Royal Aircraft Factory F.E.3—1913
- Royal Aircraft Factory B.E.7—1913
- Royal Aircraft Factory S.E.2—1913
- Royal Aircraft Factory R.E.1—1913
- Royal Aircraft Factory R.E.2—1913
- Royal Aircraft Factory B.E.8—1913
- Royal Aircraft Factory R.E.3—1913
- Royal Aircraft Factory H.R.E.2—1913
- Royal Aircraft Factory F.E.2—1914
- Royal Aircraft Factory S.E.2—1914
- Royal Aircraft Factory R.E.5—1914
- Royal Aircraft Factory S.E.4—1914
- Royal Aircraft Factory F.E.6—1914
- Royal Aircraft Factory R.E.7—1915
- Royal Aircraft Factory B.E.12—1915
- Royal Aircraft Factory B.E.9—1915
- Royal Aircraft Factory F.E.8—1915
- Royal Aircraft Factory S.E.4a—1915
- SS class airship – 1915
- Royal Aircraft Factory F.E.4 – 1916
- Royal Aircraft Factory F.E.10 – 1916
- Royal Aircraft Factory R.E.7 – 1916
- Royal Aircraft Factory R.E.8 – 1916
- Royal Aircraft Factory R.E.9 — 1916
- Royal Aircraft Factory S.E.5—1916
- Royal Aircraft Factory S.E.5a—1917
- Royal Aircraft Factory F.E.9—1917
- Royal Aircraft Factory N.E.1—1917
- Royal Aircraft Factory A.E.3—1918
- Royal Aircraft Factory C.E.1—1918
- Royal Aircraft Factory Ram—1918

No details are known for the B.E.11 and F.E.11 projects.

=== Engines ===
- RAF 1
- RAF 2
- RAF 3
- RAF 4
- RAF 5
- RAF 8

=== Controversy ===
At the time of the "Fokker Scourge" in 1915, there was a press campaign against the standardisation of Royal Aircraft Factory types in the Royal Flying Corps, allegedly in favour of superior designs available from the design departments of private British firms. This slowly gained currency, especially because of the undeniable fact that the B.E.2c and B.E.2e were kept in production and in service long after they were obsolete and that the B.E.12 and B.E.12a were indisputable failures. Some of this criticism was prejudiced and ill-informed.

Some aviation historians continue to perpetuate the resulting belittling of the important experimental work of the Factory during this period, and the exaggeration of the failings of Factory production types, several of which were described in sensationally derogatory terms.

A modern, rather more "pro-factory" point of view, can be found in several of the volumes of War Planes of the First World War, by J.M. Bruce—MacDonald, London, 1965.

== Superintendents ==
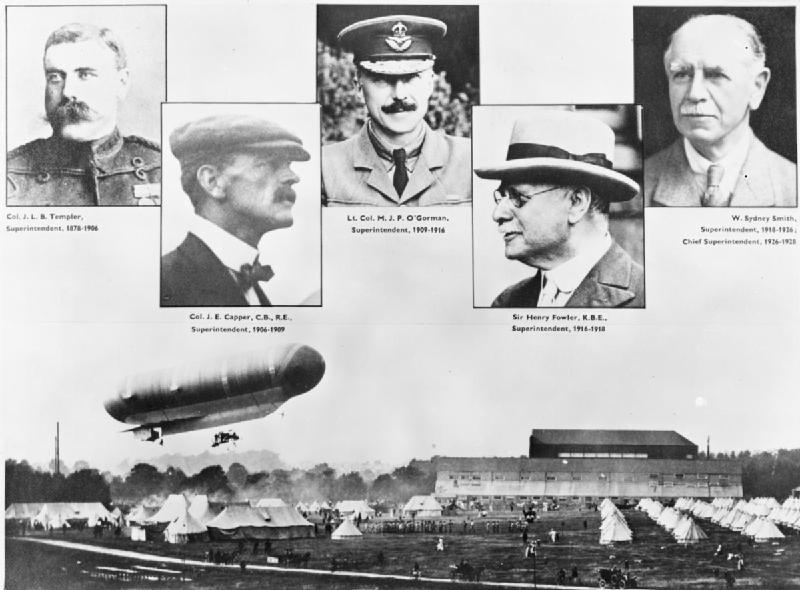
The first five Superintendents at Farnborough

The Superintendents of the School of Ballooning were James Templer (1878–1906) and John Capper (1906 – 1909). The following have served as Superintendents of the Royal Aircraft Factory / Establishment:

- Mervyn O'Gorman (1912–1916) - Also Superintendent of the Balloon Factory from 1909 to 1912
- Henry Fowler (1916–1918)
- Sidney Smith (1918-)

== Changes ==
After the end of the First World War, the design and development of aircraft types ended – although work continued on general research and the development of missiles. Research included wind tunnel testing and other aeronautical research, areas which offered rare opportunities for women in STEM fields at this time with examples including Frances Bradfield who worked at the RAE for her entire career from 1919 to her retirement; Muriel Glauert (née Barker) joined in 1918 as a researcher working in aerodynamics and Beatrice Shilling who went on to invent Miss Shilling's orifice, to improve the engine performance of RAF Hurricane and Spitfire fighters during the Battle of Britain as part of wider work at the RAE on aircraft engine problems during World War II. Johanna Weber, a German mathematician who joined the RAE after the Second World War II as part of Operation Surgeon to employ German aeronautical researchers and technicians and bring them to the UK to prevent their technical knowledge falling into the hands of the Soviet occupying forces in Germany.

In 1930, the RAE developed the Robot Air Pilot, an autopilot that used a gyro and flight controls that functioned by compressed air.

=== Aircraft ===
- Brennan Helicopter
- RAE Conceptual low altitude tactical bomber
- RAE Hurricane
- RAE Scarab
- RAE Zephyr

=== Missiles ===
- RAE Target—Surface-to-surface missile project from the early 1920s.
- RAE Larynx—1927 unmanned pilotless aircraft, surface-to-surface anti-ship missile.
- Malkara missile

=== Rockets ===
In the late fifties and through the sixties work proceeded at the RAE on several rocket projects – all of which were eventually abandoned

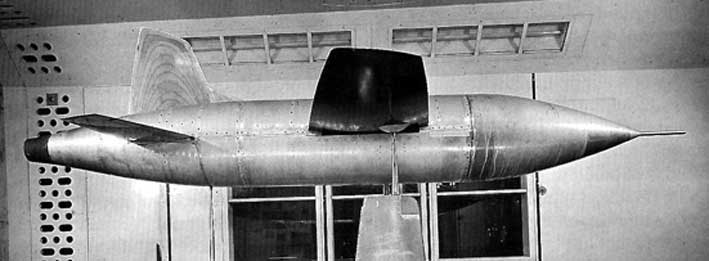
A model of the Miles M.52 undergoing supersonic wind tunnel testing at the RAE circa 1946

- R.A.E. – Vickers Transonic Research Rocket
- Black Arrow
- Black Prince
- Black Knight
- Jaguar
- Skylark

=== Space satellites ===
- Orba X-2 – space satellite
- Prospero X-3 – space satellite

== Current use of the Farnborough site ==
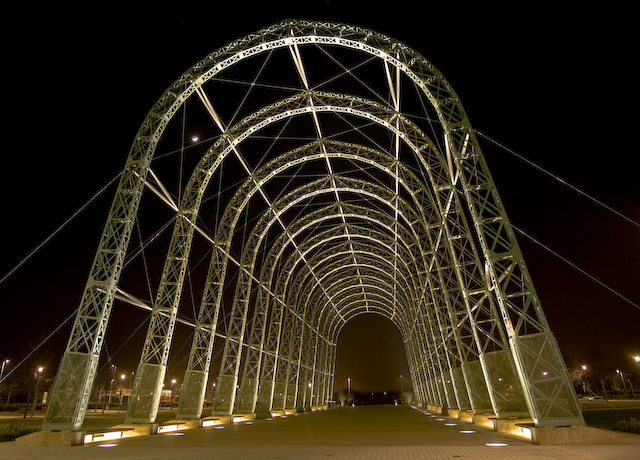
Reconstructed airship hangar at IQ Farnborough.

The former RAE Farnborough site is (as of 2011) occupied by:

- Farnborough Airport.
- QinetiQ.
- Housing, hotels, offices etc. The IQ Farnborough development includes several refurbished former-RAE buildings.
- The Farnborough Air Sciences Trust (FAST) museum, which has several former RAE aircraft and other exhibits.
- Air Accidents Investigation Branch.

The National Aerospace Library (NAL), located in the former Weapon Aerodynamics building (Q134 Building), has a collection of over 2,500 technical reports produced by the RAE.

=== Historic structures ===
The historic Farnborough factory site houses three major wind tunnels, the 24 ft (7.3 m) low-speed wind tunnel (Q121 Building), constructed during the early 1930s, the No. 2 11 ft 6 in (3.51 m) low-speed wind tunnel (R136 Building) and the 8 ft × 6 ft (2.4 m × 1.8 m) transonic wind tunnel within R133 Building, which was originally commissioned in the early 1940s as a 10 ft × 7 ft (3.0 m × 2.1 m) high subsonic speed tunnel but converted during the mid-1950s. A smaller 2 ft × 1.5 ft (0.61 m × 0.46 m) transonic tunnel is housed in R133 Building, while R52 Building contains the remaining 4 ft × 3 ft (1.22 m × 0.91 m) low turbulence wind tunnel. R52 Building had previously housed two early 10 ft x 7 ft low-speed tunnels in separate bays, which were replaced by the No. 1 11.5' and 4ft x 3ft tunnels respectively. The former remains in operation at the University of Southampton. R52 building also previously contained a 5 ft (1.5 m) open jet low-speed tunnel, originally built as a sub-scale prototype for the larger 24-ft tunnel, but subsequently modified for use as a noise measurement facility. Both Q121 and R133 are now Grade I listed buildings.

To the west of the Farnborough site is the 5-metre pressurised low-speed wind tunnel, which was commissioned in the late 1970s. This facility remains in operation by QinetiQ, primarily for the development and testing of aircraft high lift systems.

== Fictional appearance ==
The hero of Nevil Shute's 1948 novel No Highway is an eccentric "boffin" at Farnborough who predicts metal fatigue in the United Kingdom's new airliner, the fictional "Rutland Reindeer". The Comets failed for just this reason in 1954, although in the case of the Comet I the problem was in the metal structure around the navigation windows, while the point of failure in the Reindeer aircraft was in the structure of the rear empennage/fuselage joints. A film version of the novel, No Highway in the Sky, appeared in 1951, starring James Stewart as the protagonist. Stewart prepared for the role by shadowing Fred Jones OBE, a co-founder of the RAE Accident Section. Jones later was head of Structures Section (formerly Airworthiness Section) from 1957 to 1980.

== See also ==
- FAST aviation museum on the site of the RAE
- RAE Bedford, Farnborough's sister site at former RAF Thurleigh, Bedford
- Seaplane Experimental Station, Felixstowe
- Aeroplane and Armament Experimental Establishment
- National Gas Turbine Establishment, a branch of the RAE used for design and testing of gas turbine engines
- Arnold Alexander Hall
- Rhys Probert
- RAE code
