= Austin Whippet =

British single-seat aircraft

Whippet
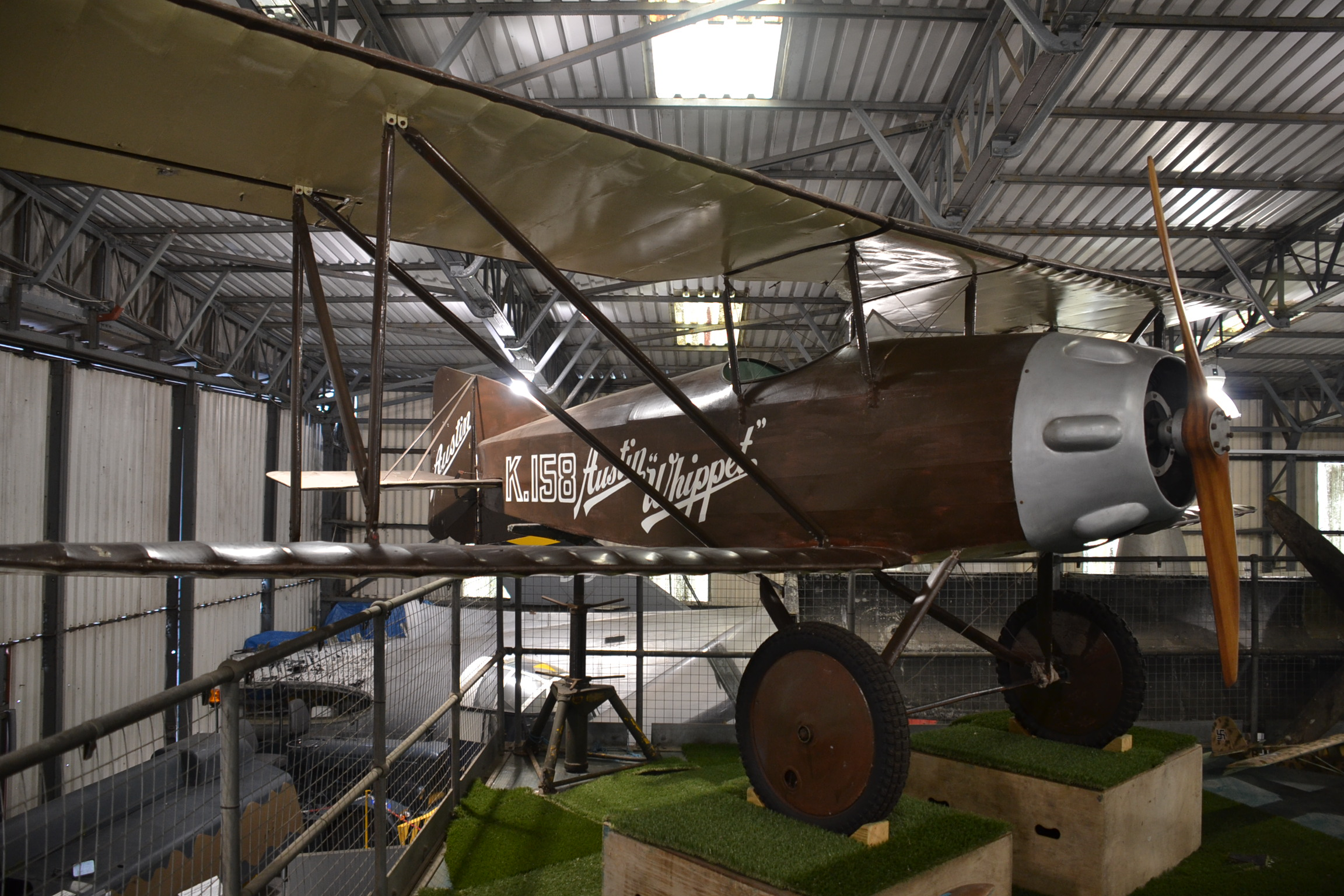
- Austin Whippet replica at South Yorkshire Aircraft Museum

General information
- Type: Private light aircraft
- National origin: Britain
- Manufacturer: Austin Motor Company
- Number built: 5

History
- First flight: 1919

The Austin Whippet was a British single-seat light aircraft that was designed and built by the Austin Motor Company just after the First World War. It was a small single-seat biplane that was intended to be an inexpensive aircraft for the amateur private pilotwere. Five were built, after which Austin abandoned aircraft production.

== Development and design ==
In 1919, John Kenworthy, chief designer of the motor manufacturer Austin Motor Company, (who had built large numbers of aircraft under license during the First World War) designed a small single-seater light aircraft in order to cash in on an expected boom in private flying. The resulting aircraft, named the Austin Whippet, was a small single-seat biplane of mixed construction, with a fabric covered steel tube fuselage, and single-bay, folding wooden wings. The wings avoided the need for rigging wires by use of streamlined steel lift struts.

The first prototype, powered by a two-cylinder horizontally opposed engine, flew in 1919, receiving its Airworthiness Certificate in December that year. Production aircraft were powered by a six-cylinder Anzani air-cooled radial, and four more aircraft followed before Austin abandoned aircraft production in 1920, when it realised that the postwar depression was severely limiting aircraft sales.

== Operational history ==
Of the five aircraft built, two were sold to New Zealand, while another was sent by its purchaser to Argentina. One of the New Zealand aircraft, serial AU.4/ZK-ACR, remained in existence at Kai Iwi in the 1940s.

A Whippet replica, marked as the first example, K-158, later G-EAGS, is currently on display at the South Yorkshire Aircraft Museum in Doncaster, UK.

== Specifications ==
Data from British Civil Aircraft since 1919: Volume I

General characteristics

- Crew: 1
- Length: 16 ft 3 in (4.95 m)
- Wingspan: 21 ft 6 in (6.55 m)
- Height: 7 ft 6 in (2.29 m)
- Wing area: 134 sq ft (12.4 m^{2})
- Empty weight: 580 lb (263 kg)
- Gross weight: 810 lb (367 kg)
- Powerplant: 1 × Anzani 6-cylinder two-row air-cooled radial piston engine, 45 hp (34 kW)
- Propellers: 2-bladed fixed-pitch propeller

Performance

- Maximum speed: 95 mph (153 km/h, 83 kn)
- Cruise speed: 80 mph (130 km/h, 70 kn)
- Endurance: 2 hours
- Time to altitude: 5,000 ft (1,520 m) in 9 minutes
