= John Kenworthy =

John Kenworthy B.Sc., F.R.Aes (1883–1940) was an English aviation engineer and aircraft designer.

John Kenworthy appears in the 1901 Census of Darlington, aged 17, living with four sisters, one brother and his parents George and Ellen Kenworthy at 65 Greenbank Road, Darlington, County Durham. His father was listed as a Schoolmaster.

In his early years he was a design assistant at the Royal Aircraft Factory formed out of the HM Balloon factory in 1911 at Farnborough, Hampshire. His first design in 1912 was the B.E.3 (Blériot Experimental), also known as the Goldfish because of its horizontal tail fin. He also designed the H.R.E.2 (Hydro Reconnaissance Experimental), a floatplane version of the earlier B.E.2 designed by Geoffrey de Havilland. Following closely in 1912 was the (B.E.4, B.E.7 and in 1913 the B.E.8) After the outbreak of the First World War in 1914, the Royal Flying Corps (RFC) needed fighter and reconnaissance aircraft from the Royal Aircraft Factory and Kenworthy as Chief designer produced the F.E.8 (Fighter Experimental) from 1916, and the R.E.8 (Reconnaissance Experimental), used from 1917. In 1916 he was part of the project team as chief draughtsman who designed the 150 hp S.E.5 (Scout Experimental), and its follow up, the S.E.5a which arrived several months later with the same basic designs, but a more powerful 200 hp engine.

In 1917 he left the Royal Aircraft Factory and joined the aircraft division of Austin Motors as chief engineer and designer in 1918. He specialised in small light aircraft, designing the prototypes of the Austin Greyhound, the Austin Whippet and the Austin Kestrel, but were not developed further by Austin Motors. In 1922 he joined Westland Aircraft Works and was chief designer at the Aircraft Disposal Co. (ADC Aircraft) in 1923. By 1930 he had designed the Robinson Redwing, which was built at the Robinson Aircraft Company in Croydon and was designed for flying clubs and private use. In 1931, the Aircraft Company was reconstituted and became the Redwing Aircraft Co Ltd. In 1932, as designer and founder of the company, he was appointed to the Board and the Aircraft Company moved their fleet of twelve aircraft to Gatwick Airport. The aerodrome was also purchased and used as the new flying base. In 1934 the Redwing Aircraft Co., moved back to Croydon aerodrome.
