= Royal Aircraft Factory S.E.5 =

Royal Aircraft Factory aircraft

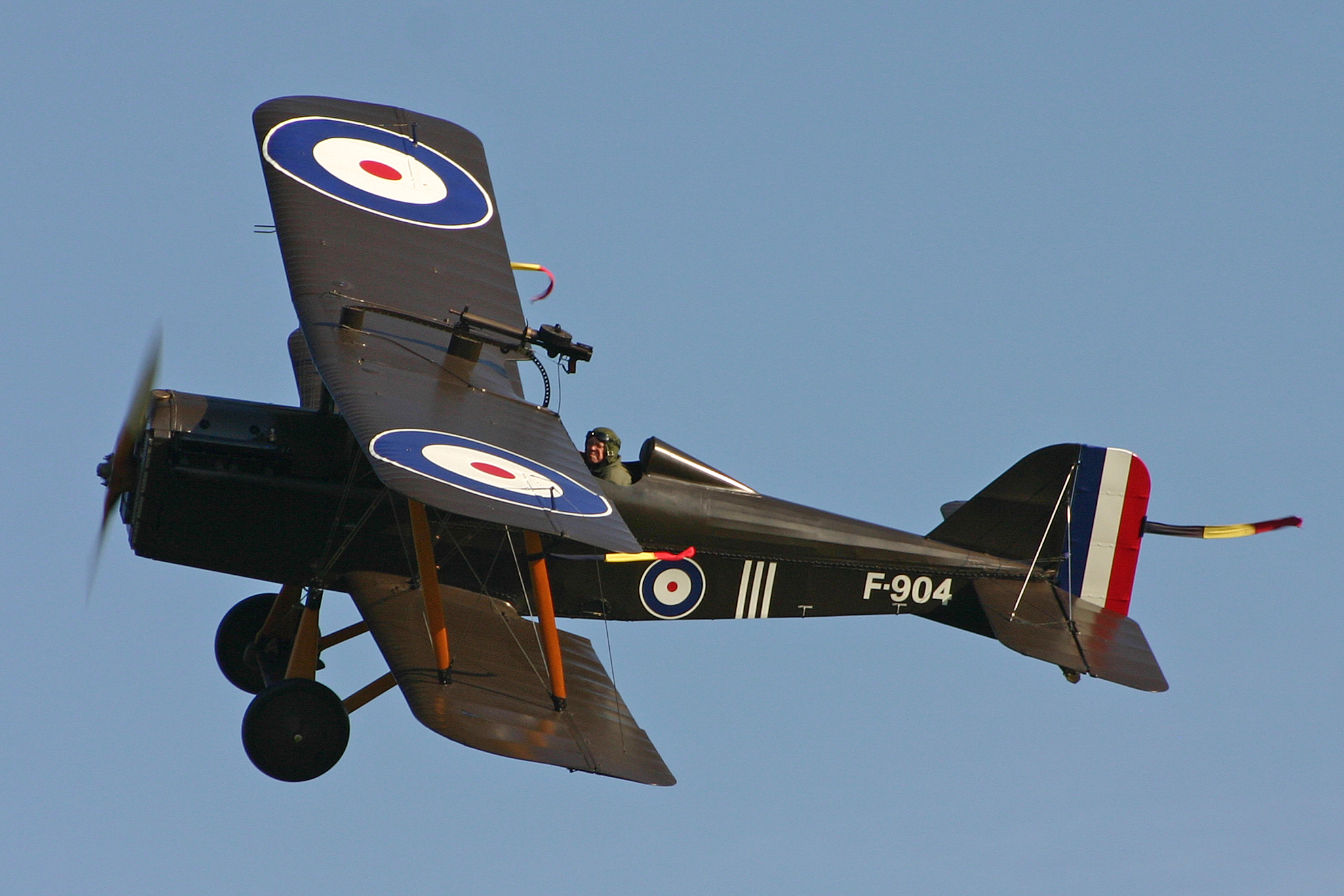
- S.E.5a number F904, Old Warden Aerodrome, Bedfordshire, England (2009)

General information
- Type: Single-seat fighter
- Manufacturer: various (see text)
- Designer: Henry Folland / John Kenworthy
- Primary users: Royal Flying Corps United States Army Air Service; Royal Australian Air Force; Royal Canadian Air Force
- Number built: 5,205

History
- Introduction date: March 1917
- First flight: 22 November 1916

The Royal Aircraft Factory S.E.5 is a British biplane fighter aircraft of the First World War. It was developed at the Royal Aircraft Factory by a team consisting of Henry Folland, John Kenworthy and Major Frank Goodden. It was one of the fastest aircraft of the war, while being both stable and relatively manoeuvrable. According to aviation author Robert Jackson, the S.E.5 was: "the nimble fighter that has since been described as the 'Spitfire of World War One'".

In most respects the S.E.5 had superior performance to the rival Sopwith Camel, although it was less immediately responsive to the controls. Problems with its Hispano-Suiza engine, particularly the geared-output H-S 8B-powered early versions, meant that there was a chronic shortage of the type until well into 1918. Thus, while the first examples had reached the Western Front before the Camel, there were fewer squadrons equipped with the S.E.5 than with the Sopwith fighter.

Together with the Camel, the S.E.5 was instrumental in regaining allied air superiority in mid-1917 and maintaining it for some time, ensuring there was no repetition of "Bloody April" 1917 when losses in the Royal Flying Corps were much heavier than in the Luftstreitkräfte. The S.E.5s remained in RAF service for some time following the Armistice that ended the conflict; some were transferred to various overseas military operators, while a number were also adopted by civilian operators.

== Development ==
=== Origins ===
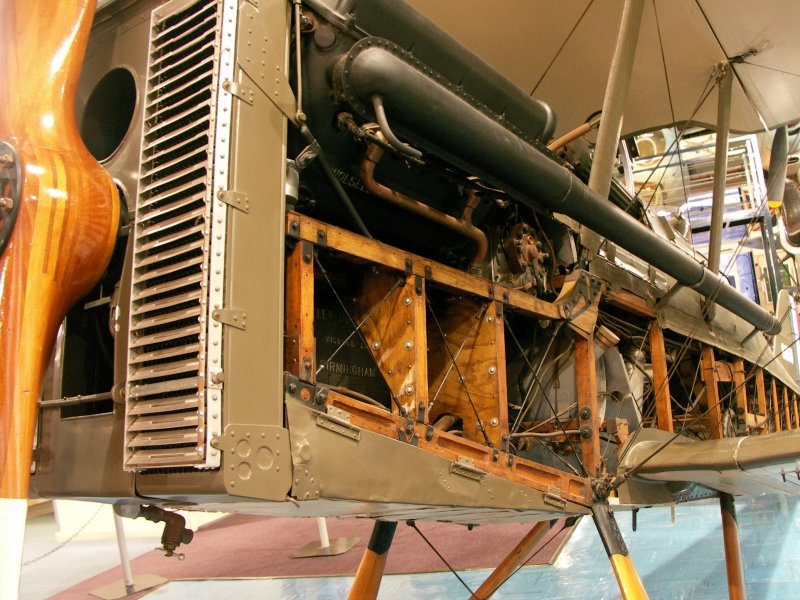
Wooden frame construction

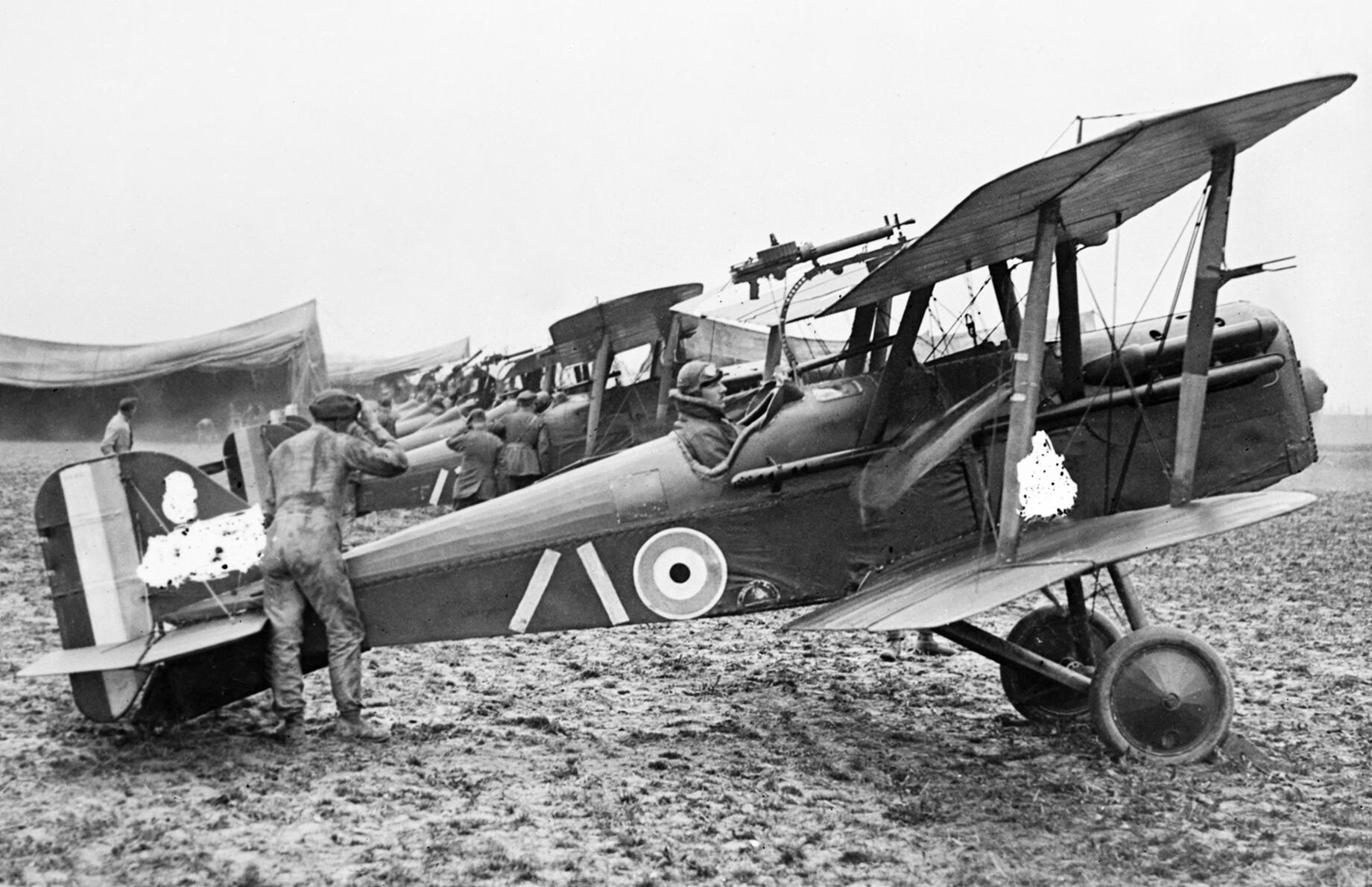
S.E.5a aircraft of No. 32 Squadron RAF. The wartime censor scratched out the serial numbers but left the squadron markings.

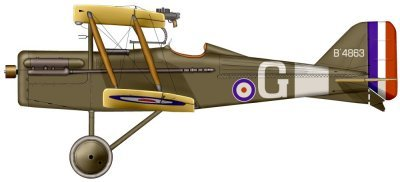
James McCudden's S.E.5a (200 h.p. geared Hispano-Suiza with 4-bladed propeller) of No. 56 Squadron RAF.

The S.E.5 (Scout Experimental 5) was designed by Henry Folland, John Kenworthy and Major Frank Goodden of the Royal Aircraft Factory in Farnborough. It was built around the new 150 hp (112 kW) Hispano-Suiza 8, a V8 engine that, while providing excellent performance, was initially underdeveloped and unreliable. The first of three prototypes flew on 22 November 1916. The first two prototypes were lost in crashes (the first killing the chief test pilot at the Royal Aircraft Factory, Major Frank Goodden, on 28 January 1917) due to a weakness in their wing design. The third prototype underwent modification before production commenced; the S.E.5 was known in service as an exceptionally strong aircraft which could be dived at very high speed – the squarer wings also gave much improved lateral control at low airspeeds.

Like the other significant Royal Aircraft Factory aircraft of the war (B.E.2, F.E.2 and R.E.8) the S.E.5 was inherently stable, making it an excellent gunnery platform, but it was also quite manoeuvrable. It was one of the fastest aircraft of the war at 138 mph (222 km/h), equal at least in speed to the SPAD S.XIII and faster than any standard German type of the period. While the S.E.5 was not as agile and effective in a tight dogfight as the Camel it was much easier and safer to fly, particularly for novice pilots. According to "Dodge" Bailey, the former Chief Test Pilot of the Shuttleworth Collection, it had "somewhat similar handling characteristics to a de Havilland Tiger Moth, but with better excess power".

=== S.E.5a ===
Only 79 original S.E.5 aircraft had been completed prior to production settling upon an improved model, designated as the S.E.5a. The initial models of the S.E.5a differed from late production examples of the S.E.5 only in the type of engine installed – a geared 200 hp Hispano-Suiza 8b, often turning a large clockwise-rotation four-bladed propeller, replacing the 150 hp H.S. 8A model. In total 5,265 S.E.5s were constructed by six manufacturers: Austin Motors (1,650), Air Navigation and Engineering Company (560), Curtiss (1), Martinsyde (258), the Royal Aircraft Factory (200), Vickers (2,164) and Wolseley Motors Limited (431).

Shortly following the American entry into World War I, plans were mooted for several American aircraft manufacturers to commence mass production of aircraft already in service with the Allied powers, one such fighter being the S.E.5. In addition to an order of 38 Austin-built S.E.5a aircraft which were produced in Britain and assigned to the American Expeditionary Force to equip already-deployed US Army squadrons, the US Government issued multiple orders to the Curtiss Aeroplane and Motor Company for the manufacture and delivery of around 1,000 S.E.5s to be produced in the United States. However, only one Curtiss-built aircraft would be completed prior to the end of the conflict, after which demand for the S.E.5 had effectively evaporated, production being quickly halted after a further 56 aircraft were assembled using already-delivered components.

At first, airframe construction outstripped the very limited supply of French-built Hispano-Suiza engines and squadrons earmarked to receive the new fighter had to soldier on with Airco DH 5s and Nieuport 24s until early 1918. The troublesome geared "-8b" model was prone to have serious gear reduction system problems, sometimes with the propeller (and even the entire gearbox on a very few occasions) separating from the engine and airframe in flight, a problem shared with the similarly-powered Sopwith Dolphin. The introduction of the 200 hp (149 kW) Wolseley Viper, a high-compression, direct-drive version of the Hispano-Suiza 8a made under licence by Wolseley Motors Limited, solved the S.E.5a's engine problems and was promptly adopted as the type's standard powerplant. A number of aircraft were subsequently converted to a two-seat configuration in order to serve as trainer aircraft.

=== S.E.5b ===
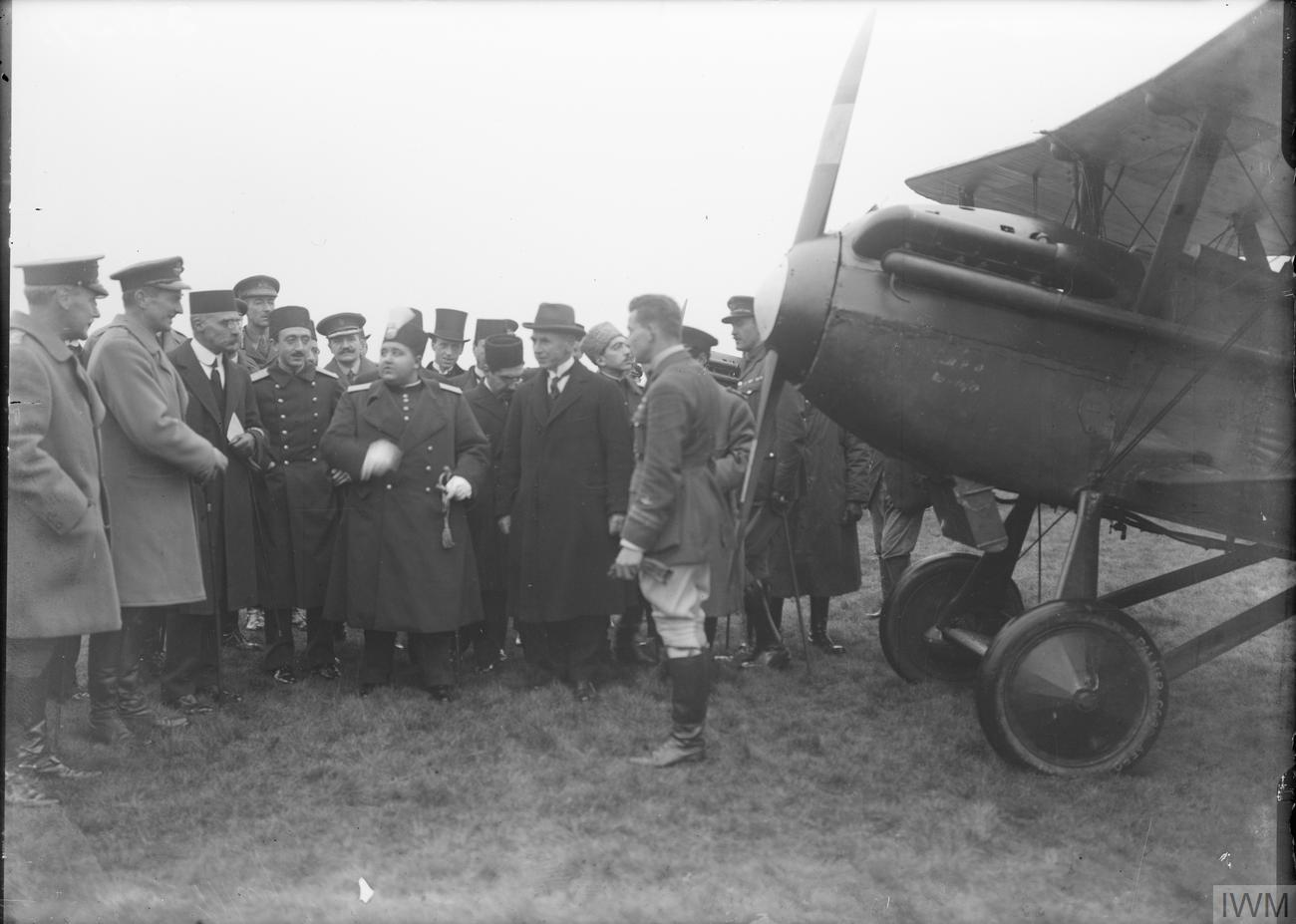
Nose of the S.E.5B being inspected

The S.E.5b was a variant of the S.E.5 with a streamlined nose and upper and lower wings of different span and chord. The single example, a converted S.E.5a, first flew in early April 1918. It had a spinner on the propeller and a retractable underslung radiator. Its performance was little better than the S.E.5a, with the extra drag of the big upper wing offsetting gains from the more streamlined fuselage. The S.E.5b was not considered for production. In January 1919, it was tested with standard S.E.5a wings and in this form survived as a research aircraft into the early twenties.

== Design ==
The Royal Aircraft Factory S.E.5 was a conventional tractor biplane fighter aircraft. The fuselage was a wire-braced box girder structure while the wings were furnished with wooden spars and internal ribs. The fuselage was narrower than many contemporary aircraft, which provided the pilot with good all-round visibility. The aircraft had considerable structural strength, which was credited with improving the type's crashworthiness and survivability. It could also withstand high-g manoeuvres and was relatively resistant to battle-damage.

Unlike many of its peers, which were highly agile but unforgiving, the S.E.5 was comparatively stable and easy to fly; its stability enabling pilots to more readily fire upon enemies from further away with a greater degree of accuracy. It had a noticeably lower accident rate than comparable aircraft. The exception to its general stability was an excessive amount of adverse yaw. The yaw could be compensated for by balanced application of the aileron and rudder, whilst adjustment of the elevator trim made it possible to fly in a 'hands off' manner.

The S.E.5 was powered by various engines, initially adopting a Hispano-Suiza 8 V8 engine. The Hispano-Suiza engine was advanced for the era, incorporating such features as an aluminium cylinder block with steel liners, dual ignition and forced lubrication that aided cooling; especially compared with contemporary rotary engines, it had the advantage of being easy to operate by most pilots. An expansion tank for the cooling system was integrated into the leading edge of the upper wing's centre section. One of its greatest advantages over the Sopwith Camel was its superior performance at altitude, making it a much better match for the Fokker D.VII when that fighter arrived at the front.

The S.E.5 was armed with a single synchronised .303-inch Vickers machine gun in contrast to the Camel's two, but it also had a wing-mounted Lewis gun fitted on a Foster mounting, which enabled the pilot to fire at an enemy aircraft from below. This armament configuration was much appreciated by the pilots of the first S.E.5 squadrons as the new hydraulic-link "C.C." synchronising gear for the Vickers machine gun was unreliable at first. The Vickers gun was mounted on the forward left dorsal surface of the fuselage with the breech inside the cockpit, at a slight upwards angle. Typically, spare magazines for the Lewis gun would have been placed within most of the free space in the cockpit including the forward areas, such as the instrumentation panel.

The standard instrument panel included a compass, altimeter, tachometer, oil pressure indicator, airspeed gauge, radiator temperature dial, fuel air pressure indicator, fuel selector, and air exchange; these were somewhat difficult to view due to their low-set position in the cockpit. According to "Dodge" Bailey, Chief Test Pilot of the Shuttleworth Collection, the S.E.5's cockpit was "the best of the bunch from the era". It was set amidships, making it difficult to see over the long front fuselage, but otherwise visibility was good.

Individual in-service S.E.5s would often receive customisations and user-specified tweaks at the request of their pilots. Popular changes included reducing the dihedral of the wings in order to increase its manoeuvrability and the removal of the head fairing to increase the pilot's visibility to the rear. James McCudden, an ace pilot and former RFC mechanic, was famous for his prolific fine-tuning of his aircraft in order to produce improved performance from it; McCudden was able to increase the top speed by 9 mph and to raise the service ceiling from the standard 17,000 ft to 20,000 ft. His adaptions included replacing the standard pistons with high compression versions, shortening the exhaust (saving weight and improving exhaust scavenging), and changes to mixture, ignition and other engine settings as well as fitting a salvaged German propeller spinner (which he himself credited as gaining 3 mph alone).

Aviation authors Donald Nijboer and Dan Patterson describe the S.E.5 as "arguably the best British-built fighter of World War I".

== Operational history ==
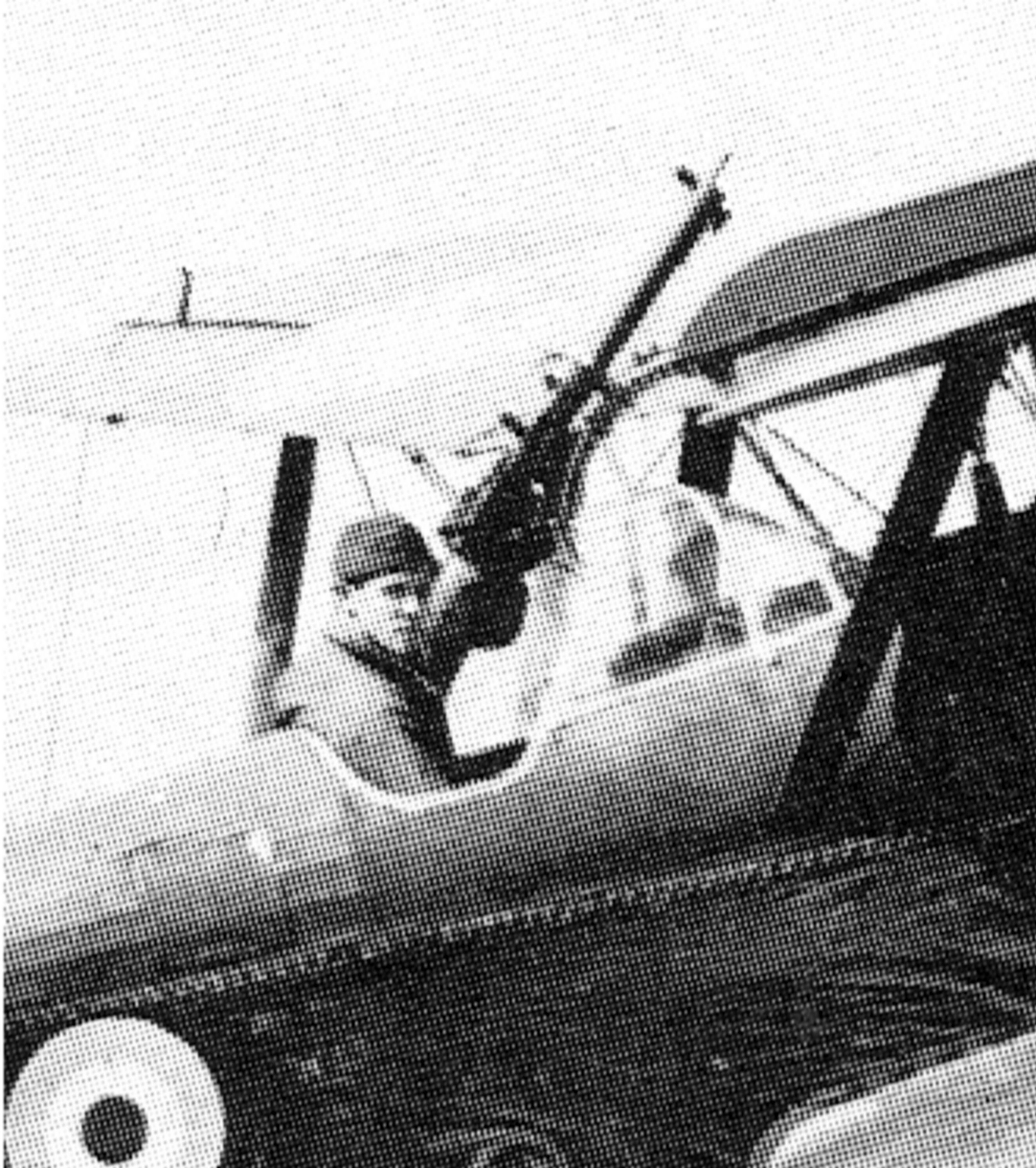
Albert Ball in S.E.5 with original windscreen and seating position

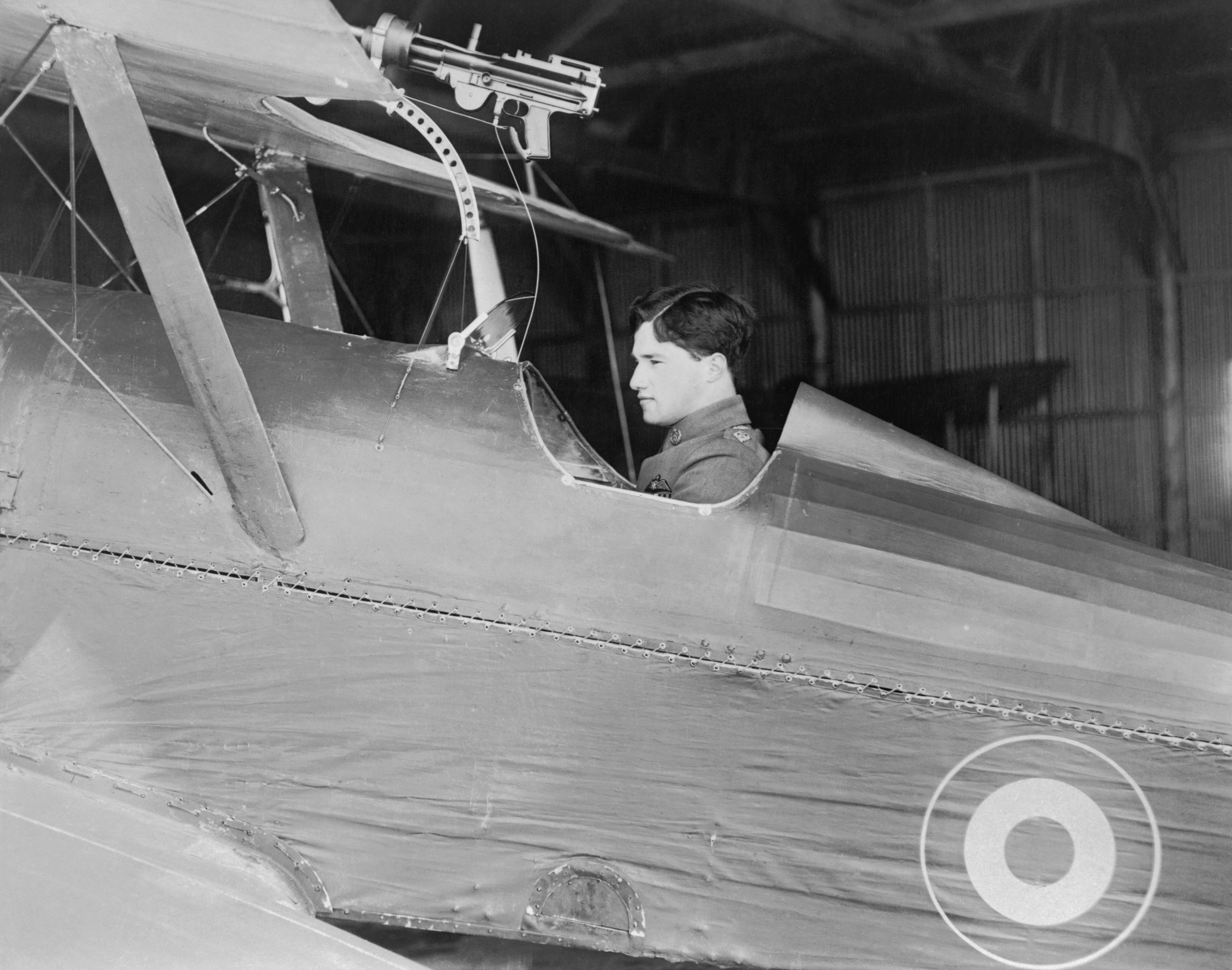
Ball in modified S.E.5 with a more conventional seating position and smaller windscreen but lacking leather padding.

In March 1917, the S.E.5 entered service with No. 56 Squadron RFC, although the squadron did not deploy to the Western Front until the following month. Everyone was suspicious of the large "greenhouse" windscreens fitted to the first production models. These were designed to protect the pilot in his unusually high seating position, which was in turn intended to improve vision over the upper wing. The squadron did not fly its first patrol with the S.E.5 until 22 April, by which time, on the insistence of Major Blomfield, 56 squadron's commanding officer, all aircraft had been fitted with small rectangular screens of conventional design. The problem of the high seating position was solved by simply lowering it, pilots in any case preferring a more conventional (and comfortable) seating position. No complaints seem to have been made about the view from the cockpit; in fact, this was often cited as one of the strong points of the type.

While pilots, some of whom were initially disappointed with the S.E.5, quickly came to appreciate its strength and fine flying qualities, it was popularly judged to have been underpowered; this failing was addressed by the introduction of the more powerful S.E.5a. In June 1917, the S.E.5a entered service and quickly began to replace the S.E.5. At this time 56 Squadron was still the only unit flying the new fighter; in fact it was the only operational unit to be fully equipped with the initial 150 hp S.E.5 – all other S.E.5 squadrons officially used the 200 hp S.E.5a from the outset – although a few S.E.5s were issued to other squadrons due to an acute shortage of the S.E.5a. Deliveries of the S.E.5a suffered from delays due to a shortage of available engines with which to power the type.

Due to the shortage of aircraft, there was a very slow initial build-up of new S.E.5a squadrons, which lasted well into 1918. Once the Wolseley Viper-powered model became plentiful, many more units were re-equipped with the type. By the end of the war, the S.E.5a was employed by a total of 21 British Empire squadrons as well as two U.S. units. Many of the top Allied aces of the Great War flew this fighter, including Billy Bishop, Andrew Beauchamp-Proctor, Edward Mannock and James McCudden. Legendary British ace Albert Ball was initially disparaging of the S.E.5, but in the end claimed 11 of his 44 victories flying it. McCudden wrote of the S.E.5: "It was very fine to be in a machine that was faster than the Huns, and to know that one could run away just as things got too hot."

Sholto Douglas who commanded No. 84 Squadron RFC which was initially equipped with the S.E.5a, listed the type's qualities as being: "Comfortable, with a good all-round view, retaining its performance and manoeuvrability at high level, steady and quick to gather speed in the dive, capable of a very fine zoom, useful in both offence and defence, strong in design and construction, [and] possessing a reliable engine".

Soon after the Armistice the S.E.5a was withdrawn from RAF service. It was retained for a time in Canada, and in 1921 a Viper-engined S.E.5a was taken to Japan by the British Aviation Mission to the Imperial Japanese Navy.

Australia received 35 S.E.5a under the Imperial Gift in 1919, and the type went on to be the newly formed R.A.A.F.’s main fighter type until the late 1920’s.

A number of machines found roles in civilian flying after the war. On 30 May 1922, the first use of skywriting for advertising occurred when Cyril Turner, a former RAF officer, spelt out "London Daily Mail" in black smoke from an S.E.5a at The Derby. Others were used for air racing; one such privately owned aircraft won the Morris Cup race in 1927.

== Variants ==
S.E.5
First production version. Single-seat fighter biplane, powered by a 150 hp (112 kW) Hispano-Suiza 8a piston engine.
S.E.5a
Improved production version, powered by a 200 hp (149 kW) Hispano-Suiza 8B, 8Ba or 8Bb V-8 (early version) or 200 hp (149 kW) Wolseley Viper piston engine.
S.E.5b
Experimental prototype, with sesquiplane wings, streamlined nose and retractable radiator.
Eberhart S.E.5e
S.E.5a assembled from spare parts by American company Eberhart Aeroplane, 180 hp Wright-Hispano E engine and plywood-covered fuselages, about 60 built.
T.E.1
Drawings for a two seat fighter described as "based on a scaled-up S.E.5" were prepared early in 1917 - the type was to have had a 31-foot 3-inch wingspan, 200 hp Hispano-Suiza 8 engine, and to have been armed with a single forward firing Vickers and a Scarff mounted Lewis for the observer. Six examples ordered (A 8951 - A 8956) but because of the success of the Bristol fighter, and in view of the shortage of Hispano-Suiza engines, none was ever completed.

== Operators ==
Argentina

- Argentine Navy – One SE.5a aircraft, in service from 1926 – 1929.

Australia

- Australian Flying Corps/Royal Australian Air Force

World War I
- No. 2 Squadron AFC in France, December 1917-February 1919.
- No. 5 (Training) Squadron AFC in the United Kingdom.
- No. 6 (Training) Squadron AFC in the United Kingdom, four aircraft only (Serials B127, B128, B129 & B133, issued April-May 1918).
Post-war
- No. 1 Squadron RAAF
- No. 3 Squadron RAAF
- No. 1 Flying Training School RAAF
Brazil

- Aviação Militar (Brazilian Army Aviation) – One SE.5a aircraft, donated by Handley Page, in service during 1920.

Canada

- Canadian Air Force
- Canadian Air Force (1920–1924)
- Royal Canadian Air Force

Chile

- Chilean Air Force

Ireland

- Irish Air Service
- Irish Air Corps

Poland

- Polish Air Force
  - Polish 7th Air Escadrille operated one S.E.5a in 1920, during the Polish-Soviet war

South Africa

- South African Air Force

United Kingdom

- Royal Flying Corps/Royal Air Force

- No. 1 Squadron RAF, January 1918-May 1919
- No. 17 Squadron RAF
- No. 24 Squadron RAF, December 1917-January 1919
- No. 29 Squadron RAF, January 1918-August 1919
- No. 30 Squadron RAF
- No. 32 Squadron RAF, February 1918-March 1919
- No. 40 Squadron RAF, October 1917-January 1919
- No. 41 Squadron RAF, October 1917-January 1919
- No. 47 Squadron RAF, November 1917-March 1918
- No. 50 Squadron RAF
- No. 56 Squadron RAF, May 1917-January 1919
- No. 60 Squadron RAF, August 1917-January 1919
- No. 61 Squadron RAF, November 1917-April 1918
- No. 64 Squadron RAF, October 1917-January 1919
- No. 68 Squadron RAF
- No. 72 Squadron RAF
- No. 74 Squadron RAF, November 1917-February 1919
- No. 78 Squadron RAF
- No. 81 Squadron RAF
- No. 84 Squadron RAF, September 1917-June 1919
- No. 85 Squadron RAF, December 1917-February 1919
- No. 88 Squadron RAF, January-March 1918
- No. 91 Squadron RAF, March-September 1918
- No. 92 Squadron RAF, March 1918-April 1919
- No. 93 Squadron RAF, February-August 1918
- No. 94 Squadron RAF, March 1918-January 1919
- No. 111 Squadron RAF, June 1918-January 1919
- No. 143 Squadron RAF, July 1918
- No. 145 Squadron RAF, June-November 1918
- No. 150 Squadron RAF, August 1918-February 1919
- No. 229 Squadron RAF

United States

- Air Service of the American Expeditionary Force
  - 25th Aero Squadron, November 1918-April 1919
- United States Navy

== Surviving aircraft and replicas ==
=== Originals ===
The Shuttleworth Collection's SE5a at Farnborough 1962, then painted as D7000 ...
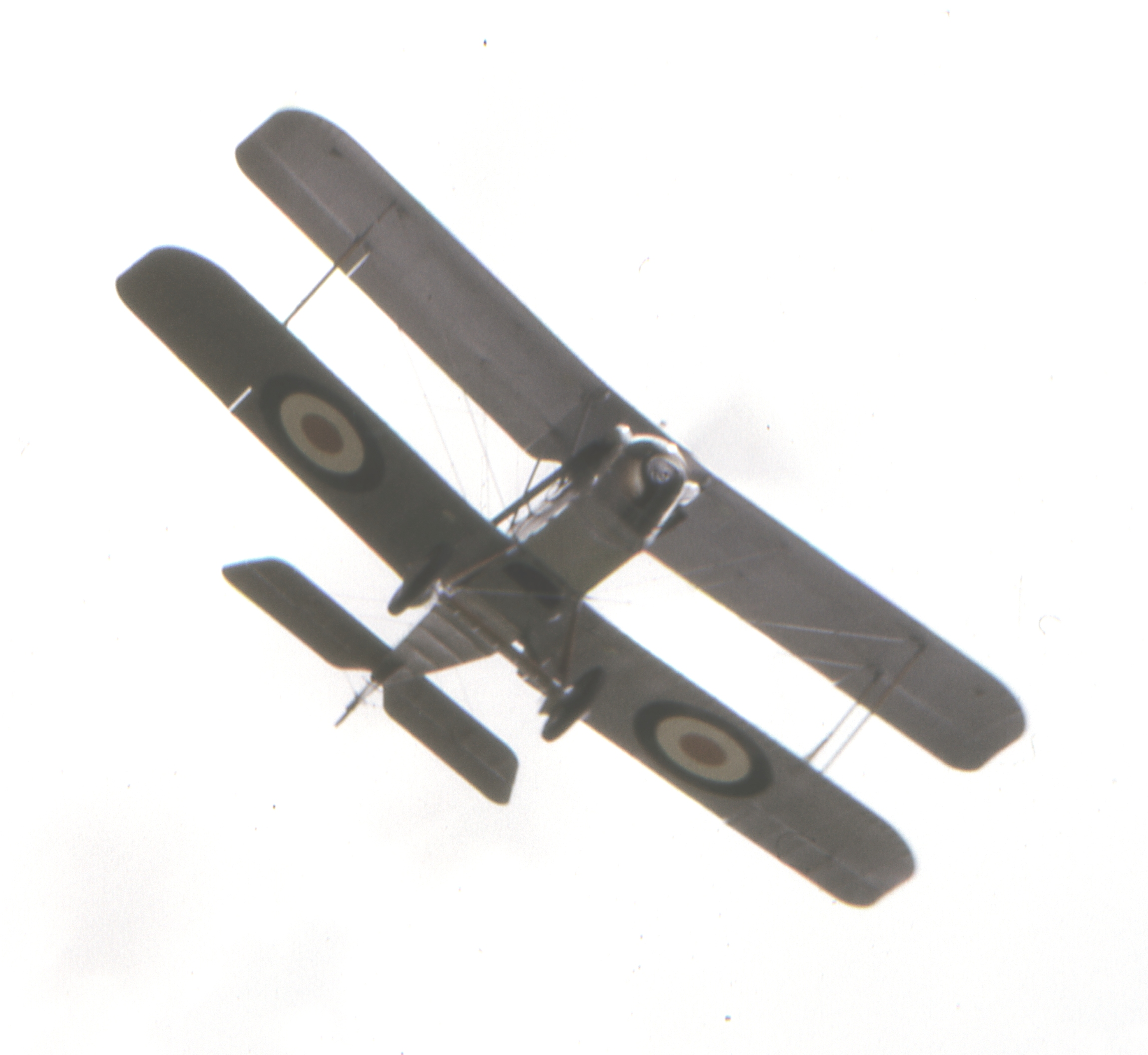
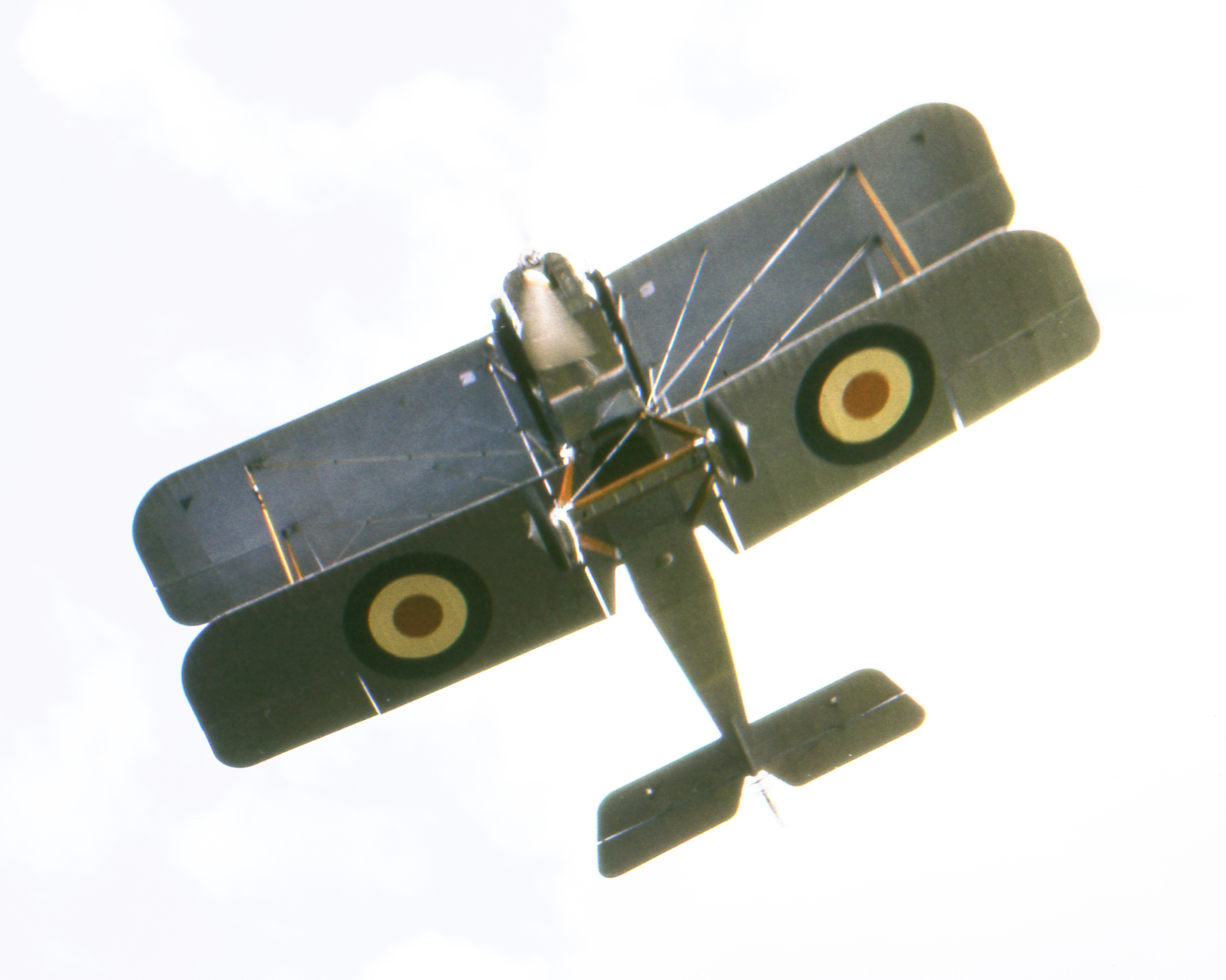

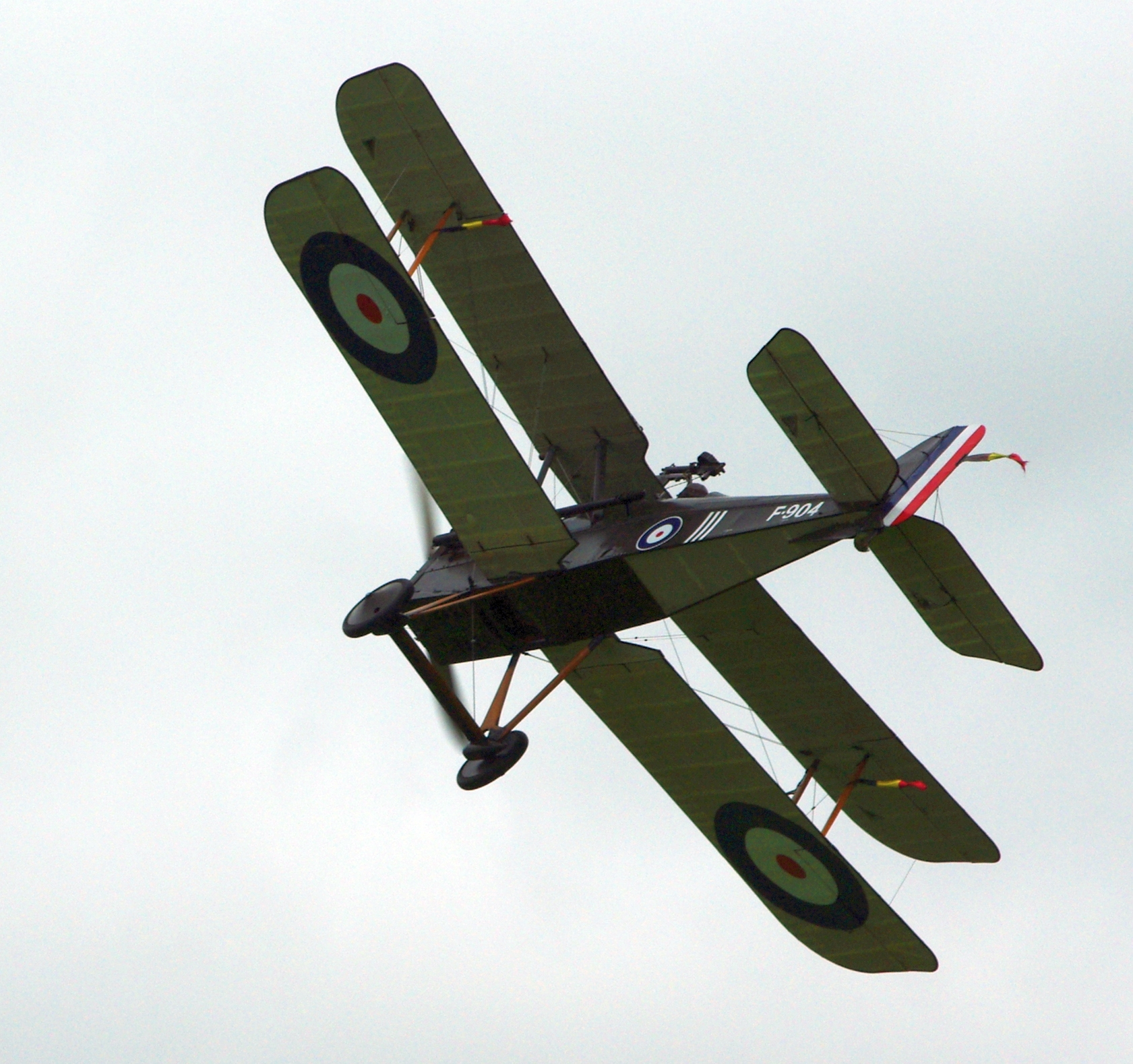
... and almost 52 years on as F-904 at Old Warden

An original S.E.5a may be seen at the Shuttleworth Collection at Old Warden, England, UK. This aircraft was originally serial F904 of No. 84 Squadron RAF, then flew as G-EBIA from September 1923 to February 1932. It was stored between 1933 and 1955, before being restored to a flightworthy condition by staff at the Royal Aircraft Establishment and then passed onto the Shuttleworth Collection. An extensive refurbishment of this aircraft was performed in 2007. It has been re-registered as G-EBIA, it was first painted as D7000, then as F904.

An original S.E.5e may be seen in the National Museum of the United States Air Force at Dayton, Ohio, USA. The museum acquired the S.E.5e through a donation by the estate of Lt. Col. William C. Lambert, USAF Ret, a First World War ace with 21.5 victories. Lambert flew the S.E.5a as an American member of the Royal Flying Corps and the Royal Air Force. The Air Force Museum Foundation also helped buy the aircraft. It is painted to represent an S.E.5e of the 18th Headquarters Squadron, Bolling Field, Washington, D.C., in 1925.

Another four original airframes are statically displayed at: the Science Museum, London, UK; Royal Air Force Museum, London, UK; South African National Museum of Military History, Johannesburg, South Africa; and the Australian War Memorial, Canberra, Australia.

=== Reproductions ===
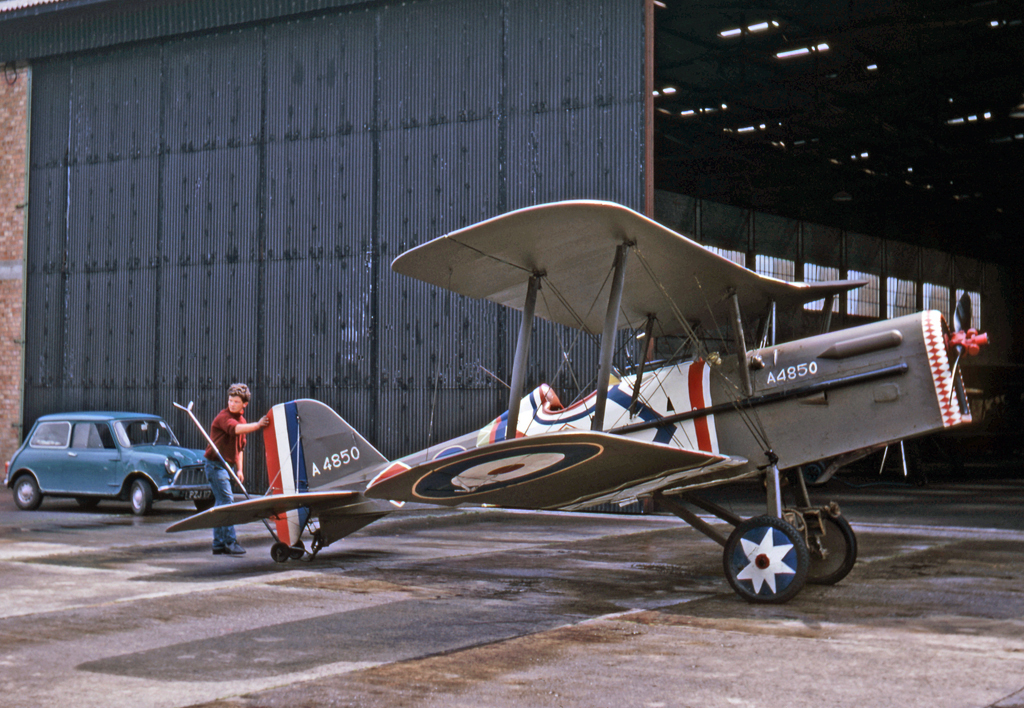
Full-scale replica S.E.5a built by Miles Aircraft in 1965 and used in films

Two full-scale replica S.E.5a aircraft were built by Miles Aircraft in 1965 for use in film making and were transferred to the Irish civil aircraft register in 1967 while the two were employed in flying scenes for the 1966 war movie The Blue Max.

Three flightworthy reproductions (designated SE5a-1), along with a single static example, were constructed by The Vintage Aviator Limited in New Zealand. According to the group, the reproduction aircraft, which was the company's first project, combined some authentic components, such as the Hispano engines used, with newly-fabricated parts based on original archived drawings.

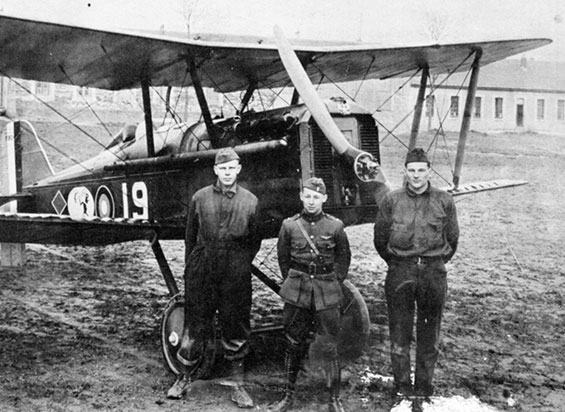
Beauchamp-Proctor's former wingman, "Child Yank" Boudwin (center) with 25th Aero Squadron groundcrew, and his last S.E. 5a, F8010

The Museum of Flight in Seattle, Washington, US displays the reproduction SE.5a that Bobby Strahlman and his partners completed for collector Doug Champlin in 1989. This reproduction features one .303 Vickers and one .303-calibre Lewis machine gun, and carries the paint scheme of American ace George Vaughn who served with the Royal Flying Corps. The SE.5 was displayed at Champlin's fighter museum at Mesa, Arizona, US until the collection was transferred to Seattle in 2003.

== Specifications (S.E.5a) ==
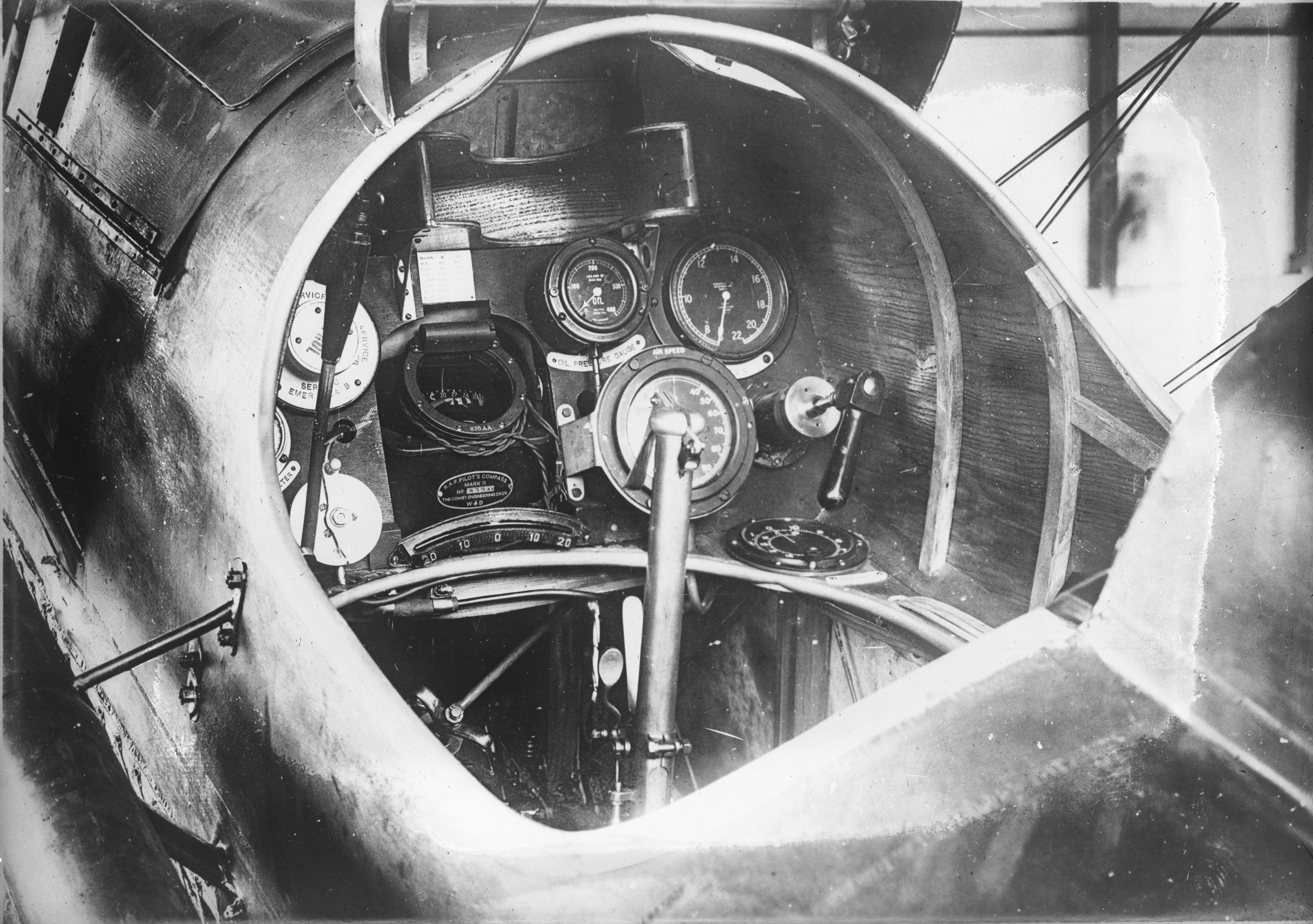
Close-up of the cockpit instrumentation of a S.E.5

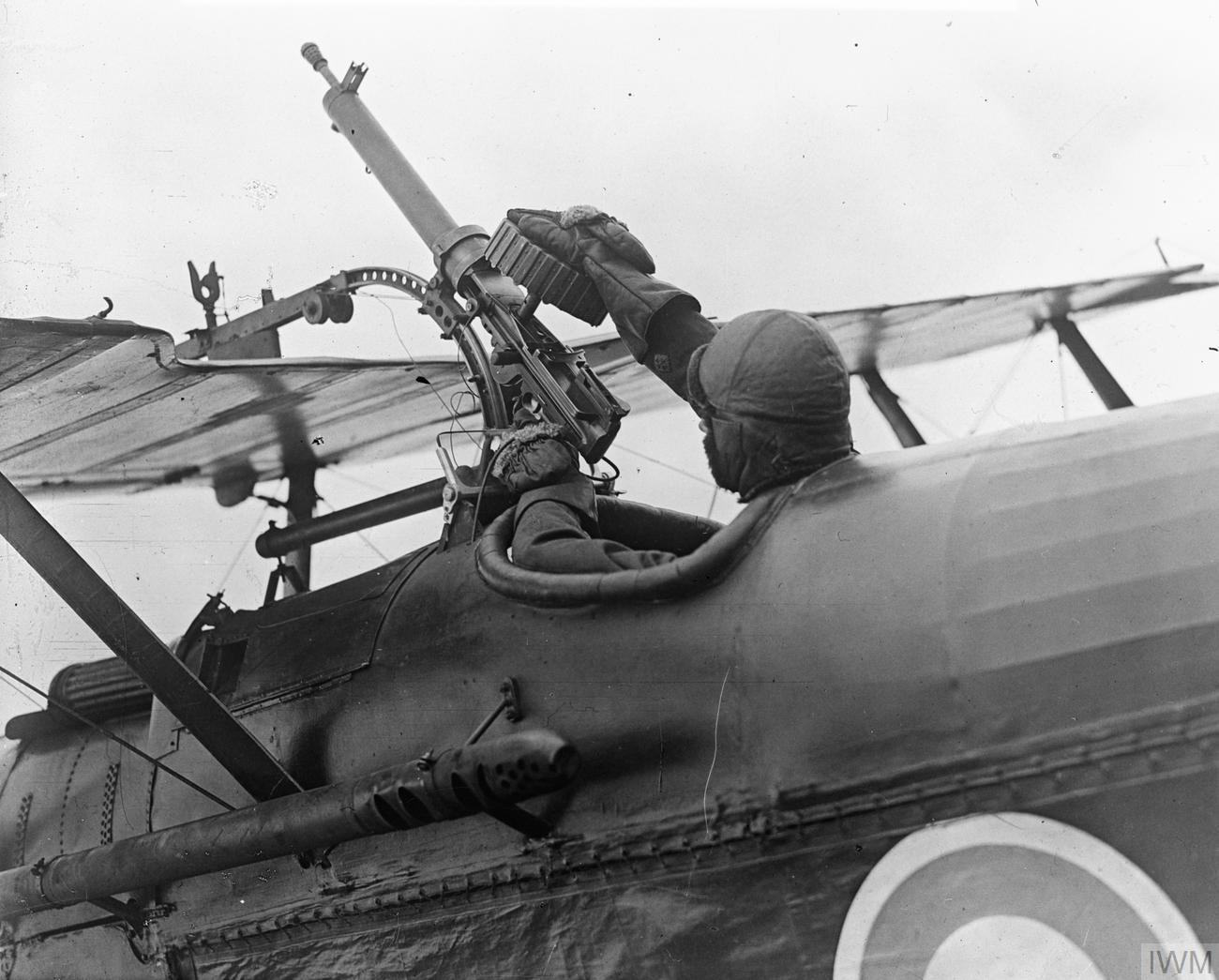
Pilot in the cockpit. Note the forward-firing .303 in (7.7 mm) Vickers and Lewis machine guns

Data from South African National Museum of Military History The Vintage Aviator

General characteristics

- Crew: One
- Length: 20 ft 11 in (6.38 m)
- Upper wingspan: 26 ft 7 in (8.10 m)
- Upper chord: 60 in (1.52 m)
- Lower wingspan: 26 ft 7 in (8.10 m)
- Lower chord: 60 in (1.52 m)
- Height: 9 ft 6 in (2.90 m)
- Wing area: 244 sq ft (22.7 m^{2})
- Airfoil: RAF15
- Empty weight: 1,410 lb (640 kg)
- Gross weight: 1,935 lb (878 kg)
- Max takeoff weight: 1,988 lb (902 kg)
- Undercarriage track: 60 in (1.5 m)
- Powerplant: 1 × Hispano-Suiza 8 or Wolseley Viper water cooled V8 engine, 150 hp (110 kW)
- Propellers: 2 or 4-bladed fixed pitch wooden propeller, 7 ft 9 in (2.36 m) diameter

Performance

- Maximum speed: 138 mph (222 km/h, 120 kn)
- Range: 300 mi (480 km, 260 nmi)
- Service ceiling: 17,000 ft (5,200 m)
- Wing loading: 7.93 lb/sq ft (38.7 kg/m^{2})

Armament

- Guns:
  - 1 x .303 in (7.7 mm) forward-firing Vickers machine gun with Constantinesco interrupter gear
  - 1 x .303 in (7.7 mm) Lewis gun on Foster mounting on upper wing
- Bombs:
  - 4x 25 lb (11 kg) Cooper bombs, two under each lower wing, to be dropped in 2, 3, 4, 1 order.

== Notable appearances in media ==
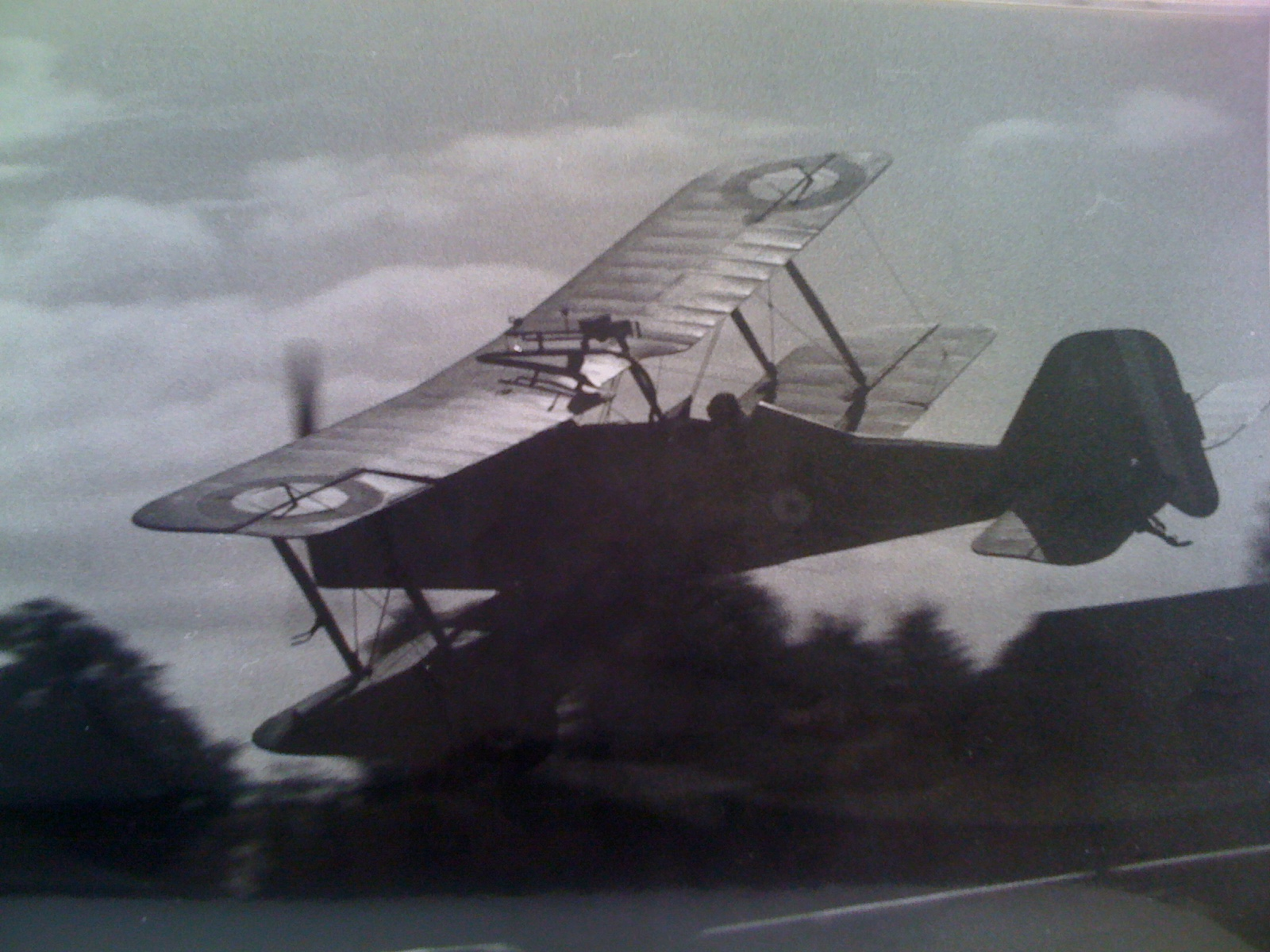
Lynn Garrison's Miles built SE5 15 September 1970 immediately before fatal crash of Charles Boddington during filming of Von Richthofen and Brown

The Royal Aircraft Factory S.E.5 has been portrayed, both by original and replica aircraft, in various movies. These include Wings (1927), Hell's Angels (1930), Flying Down to Rio (1933), Crimson Romance (1934), Test Pilot (1939) and The Aviator (2004). Converted Stampe et Vertongen SV.4 trainer/tourer aircraft were used to portray S.E.5s in the 1976 Anglo-French production Aces High.

The 1971 film Zeppelin makes reference to the use of the S.E.5 as a weapon to defend against the German Zeppelins that were attacking Britain during the First World War. The film, however, is set in the fall of 1915, a full year-and-a-half before the S.E. 5 entered squadron service. The dogfight scene near the film's conclusion features S.E.5a replicas.

== See also ==
External videos
- Video of a S.E.5 in flight
- Archive footage of a taxiing S.E.5a during the Great War
- Footage of a preserved S.E.5 performing at an air show

Aircraft of comparable role, configuration, and era

- Albatros D.V
- Ansaldo A.1 Balilla
- Fokker D.VII
- Nieuport 28
- Sopwith Camel
- Sopwith Snipe
- SPAD S.XIII

Notable S.E.5 pilots

- Albert Ball, VC, DSO and two bars, MC
- Mick Mannock, VC, DSO & two Bars, MC & Bar
- James McCudden, VC, DSO & Bar, MC & Bar, MM
- Andrew Beauchamp-Proctor, VC, DSO, MC and bar, DFC
- Cecil Lewis, MC
- Thomas Herbert, British Distinguished Flying Cross & American Distinguished Service Cross. Future Ohio Attorney General, Governor of Ohio, and Ohio Supreme Court Justice.
