= Royal Aircraft Factory B.E.8 =

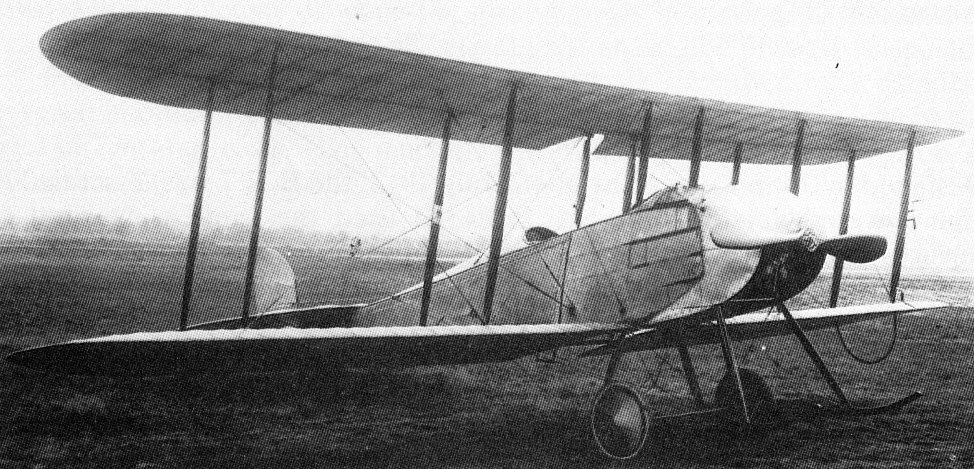
- B.E.8 prototype

General information
- Type: Two-seat general purpose biplane
- Manufacturer: Various (designed at Royal Aircraft Factory)
- Designer: John Kenworthy
- Primary user: Royal Flying Corps
- Number built: approx 70

History
- Introduction date: 1914
- First flight: 1913
- Retired: 1916

The Royal Aircraft Factory B.E.8 was a British two-seat single-engined general purpose biplane of the First World War, designed by John Kenworthy at the Royal Aircraft Factory in 1913. Small numbers were used by the Royal Flying Corps over the Western Front in the first year of the war, with the type being used as a trainer until 1916.

== Development and design ==
The B.E.8 was the definitive development of the earlier B.E 3 type, and the last of the B.E. series to be designed with a rotary engine. The main changes were that the lower wings were now attached to the fuselage near the lower longerons, rather than running under it, and that the tail unit was changed to the B.E.2 pattern. Three prototypes were built at Farnborough with a single long cockpit for both crew members. The production aircraft had two separate cockpits and were built by sub-contractors. The improved B.E.8a of 1915 had new B.E.2c type wings, featuring ailerons instead of wing warping and a revised tail unit.

== Operational history ==
Both models of the aircraft entered service with the Royal Flying Corps and a small number served in France in 1914 and early 1915 but most were used by training units.

== Variants ==
BE.8
Production aircraft with wing warping.
BE.8a
Production aircraft with ailerons.

== Operators ==
United Kingdom

- Royal Flying Corps
  - No. 1 Squadron RFC
  - No. 2 Squadron RFC
  - No. 3 Squadron RFC
  - No. 5 Squadron RFC
  - No. 6 Squadron RFC
  - No. 9 Squadron RFC

== Specifications (BE.8) ==
Data from The Royal Aircraft Factory

General characteristics

- Crew: 2
- Length: 27 ft 4.5 in (8.344 m)
- Wingspan: 37 ft 8 in (11.48 m)
- Height: 9 ft 4 in (2.84 m)
- Wing area: 368 sq ft (34.2 m^{2})
- Powerplant: 1 × Gnome 7 Lambda 7-cylinder air-cooled rotary piston engine, 80 hp (60 kW)
- Propellers: 2-bladed fixed-pitch propeller

Performance

- Maximum speed: 70 mph (110 km/h, 61 kn) at sea level
- Endurance: 1 hour 30 minutes
- Time to altitude: 3,000 ft (914 m) in 10 minutes 30 seconds

Armament

- Guns: Small arms operated by crew
- Bombs: 1× 100 lb (45 kg) bomb

== See also ==
Related lists

- List of aircraft of the Royal Flying Corps
