= Royal Aircraft Factory F.E.3 =

F.E.3
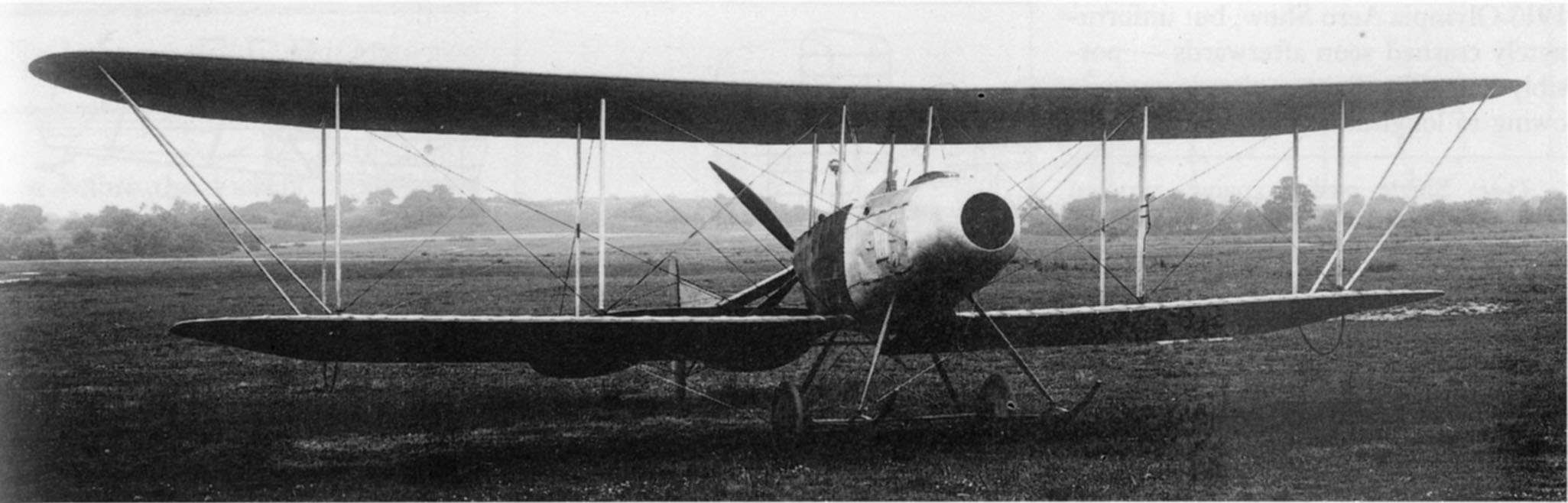

General information
- Type: Experimental armed aircraft
- National origin: United Kingdom
- Manufacturer: Royal Aircraft Factory
- Status: Prototype
- Number built: 1

History
- First flight: 1913

The Royal Aircraft Factory F.E.3 (also known as the A.E.1 ("Armed Experimental") was a British experimental single-engined pusher biplane built prior to the First World War. It was intended to be fitted with a shell-firing gun, but was quickly abandoned, being found to be structurally unsound.

== Design and development ==
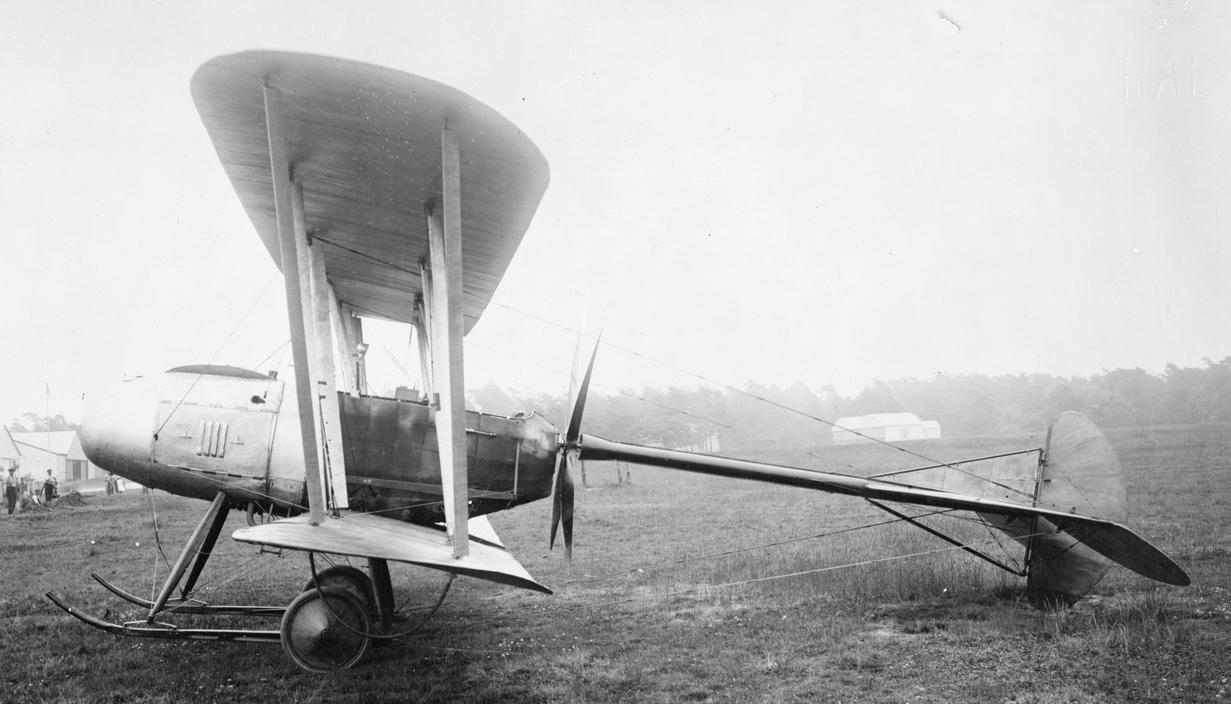

In 1913, the Royal Aircraft Factory designed an experimental armed pusher biplane, the F.E.3 ("Farman" or "Fighting" Experimental), with the alternative designation A.E.1 ("Armed Experimental"). The F.E.3 was to carry a Coventry Ordnance Works 1½ lb shell-firing quick loading gun. In order to reduce the drag associated with the pusher layout favoured for gun-carrying aircraft, the tail was carried on a single tubular tailboom connected by bearings to the four-bladed propeller, with bracing wires running to the wings and undercarriage. The crew of two, gunner and pilot, sat in tandem in a wood and metal nacelle. The aircraft was powered by a single water-cooled Chenu inline engine mounted in the nose of the nacelle, connected to a long shaft running under the cockpit which drove the propeller using a chain drive. The gun was to fire through the cooling intake for the engine.

It flew in the summer of 1913, but testing was stopped after the aircraft's propeller broke in flight resulting in a forced landing. Flight testing did not resume, as it was realised that the tailboom was not strong enough to allow safe flying. Although the F.E.3 did not fly again, the gun installation was test fired with the aircraft suspended from a hangar roof, showing that recoil loads were not excessive.

== Specifications ==
Data from The Royal Aircraft Factory

General characteristics

- Crew: 2
- Length: 29 ft 3 in (8.92 m)
- Wingspan: 40 ft 0 in (12.19 m)
- Height: 11 ft 3 in (3.43 m)
- Wing area: 436.5 sq ft (40.55 m^{2})
- Empty weight: 1,400 lb (635 kg)
- Max takeoff weight: 2,080 lb (943 kg)
- Powerplant: 1 × Chenu water-cooled inline engine, 100 hp (75 kW)
- Propellers: 4-bladed

Performance

- Maximum speed: 75 mph (121 km/h, 65 kn) at sea level
- Service ceiling: 5,000 ft (1,500 m)
- Rate of climb: 350 ft/min (1.8 m/s)
