= Royal Aircraft Factory R.E.1 =

Early 20th century aircraft type

R.E.1
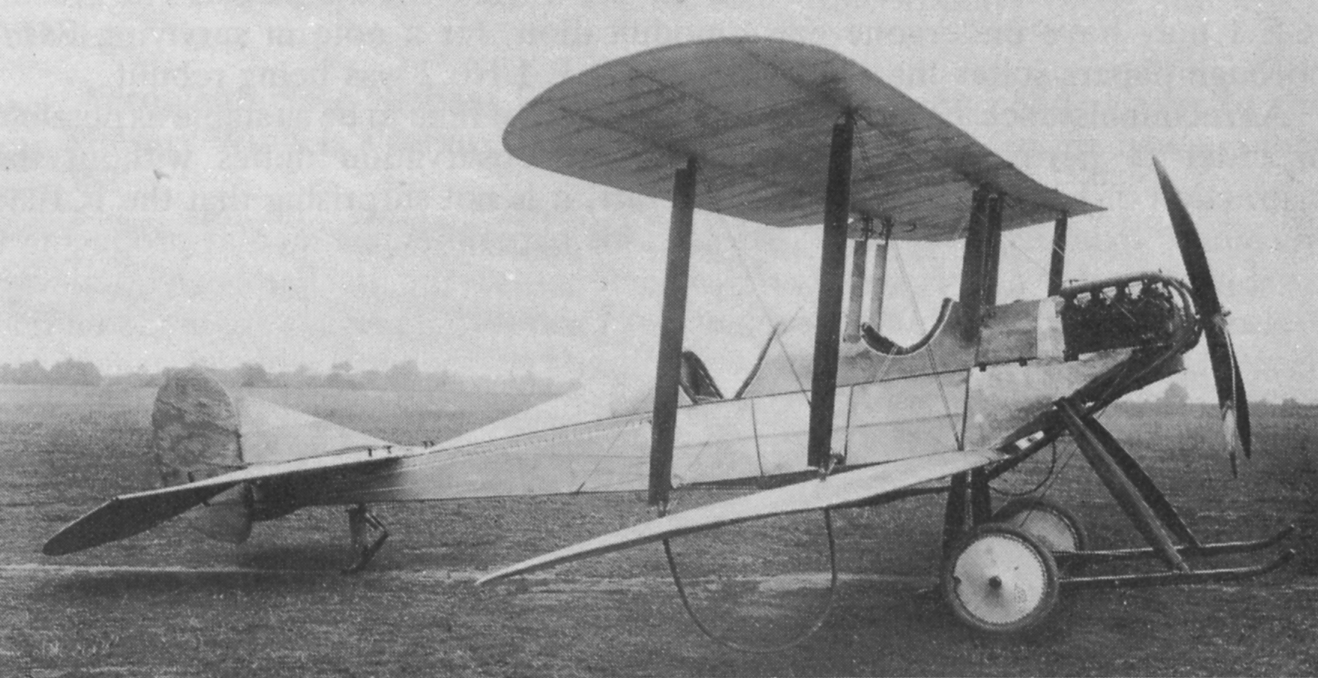
- The first R.E.1 in its earliest form in July 1913

General information
- Type: Reconnaissance
- National origin: United Kingdom
- Manufacturer: Royal Aircraft Factory
- Designer: H.P. Folland
- Number built: 2

History
- First flight: July 1913

The Royal Aircraft Factory R.E.1 was an experimental two-seat single-engined biplane from before World War I, intended to develop reconnaissance aircraft.

== Design and development ==
The earliest systematic naming scheme used by the Royal Aircraft Factory categorised by layout, e.g. B.E.2, with B for Bleriot type or tractor aircraft plus E for experimental. A few types, like the B.S.1 were briefly named under a layout plus role scheme (S for scout), but by the end of 1913 the B.S.1 had become the S.E.2 (Scout Experimental), the layout letter dropped. The initial sketches for what became known as the R.E.1 (Reconnaissance Experimental) were labelled B.S.2. In this context reconnaissance meant two-seaters, as opposed to the single-seat scouts.

At that time reconnaissance or scouting was seen as the only military purpose of aircraft. The R.E.1, completed in July 1913, was described in contemporary reports as intended for the same purposes as the B.E.2, using the same engine but being an aircraft of more modern refinement. It was a single bay biplane with equal span, constant chord wings, unswept but with stagger. Wing warping was used for lateral control. The rudder was similar to that of the B.E.2, curved and extending below the fuselage, but a triangular fin was fitted that reached forward to the strongly swept leading edge of the B.E.2 style tailplane.

The fuselage was flat sided with deep, rounded decking and slender overall to the rear. The cockpits were in tandem, the pilot's at the rear with sides cut to the bottom of the decking. He sat behind the trailing edge, with a cut-out in the upper wing to improve visibility. The observer's cockpit was between the wings and less deep. The air-cooled 70 hp (52 kW) Renault engine was uncowled and drove a four-bladed propeller. The single-axle undercarriage was attached to two longitudinal members which ran forward to serve as anti-nose-over skids, fixed to the fuselage by two pairs of robust struts.

By September 1913 the only two R.E.1s built, serials 607 and 608, were with the Flying Department of the Royal Aircraft Factory. They were intended as experimental machines and were much modified. One desire was to make automatically stable aircraft, so they could be flown hands-off to give the pilot observation time. Within a month or so of completion, 607 had a wing extension of about 2 ft (610 mm) and 608 was probably built with the extension. In November 607 had four fins attached to the upper wing top surface, positioned above each pair of interplane struts and above each of the centre section struts; soon after 608 had them too, plus a reduction of stagger and a finless, enlarged rudder. In the quest for stability 607, now with ailerons replacing wing warping had a series of increases in dihedral, By March 1914 it could be flown hands off in "squally conditions". Later its stagger was also reduced and a rectangular tailplane fitted.

In May 1914 the second R.E.1, no. 608 was transferred to the RFC and for a short while wore the number 362, though it went to war in August as 608. It may have gone with under-seat armour, albeit only 1/25th in (1 mm) thick, but it only survived for about a week. 607 stayed at Farnborough and was still at work in February 1915 doing photographic and wireless testing.

== Specifications (short span) ==
Data from Bruce 1992, pp. 444

General characteristics

- Crew: 2
- Wingspan: 34 ft 0 in (10.4 m)
- Wing area: 316 sq ft (29.3 m^{2})
- Empty weight: 1,000 lb (454 kg)
- Gross weight: 1,580 lb (717 kg)
- Powerplant: 1 × Renault air–cooled upright 90° V-8 , 70 hp (52 kW)

Performance

- Maximum speed: 83 mph (134 km/h, 72 kn)
- Rate of climb: 600 ft/min (3.0 m/s)
