= Royal Aircraft Factory B.E.3 =

B.E.3/B.E.4/B.E.7
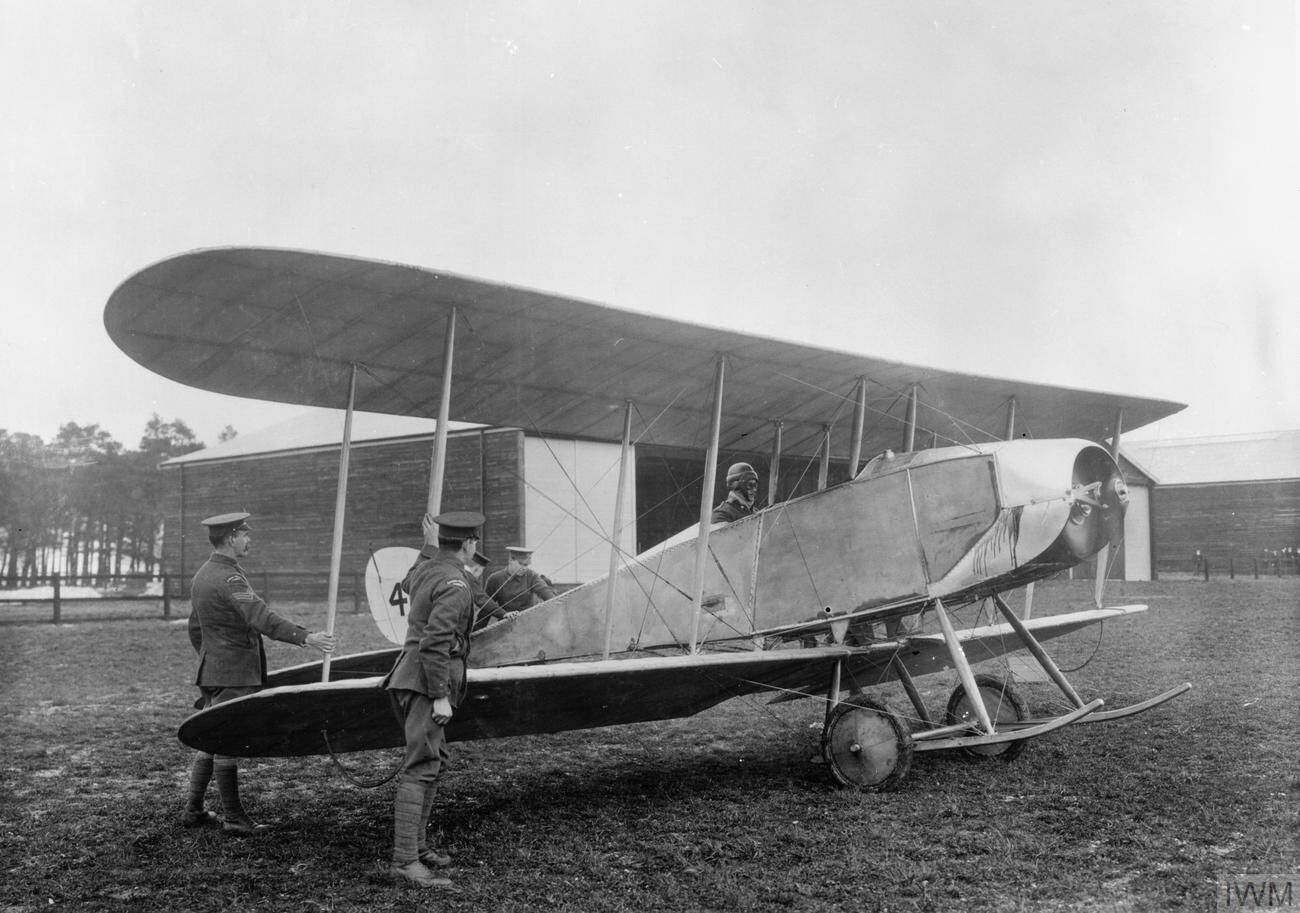
- Royal Aircraft Factory B.E.4 № 417 at the Central Flying School, Upavon, 1913

General information
- Type: Training aircraft
- National origin: United Kingdom
- Manufacturer: Royal Aircraft Factory
- Designer: John Kenworthy
- Primary user: Royal Flying Corps
- Number built: At least 5

History
- Introduction date: 1912
- First flight: 3 May 1912

The Royal Aircraft Factory B.E.3 was a single-engined rotary engined biplane developed by the British Royal Aircraft Factory prior to the First World War. The B.E.4 and B.E.7 were virtually identical aircraft that differed only in the engine fitted.

== Design and development ==
In December 1911, the Royal Aircraft Factory started work of a new biplane of similar layout to its B.E.1 and B.E.2, but powered by a rotary engine to allow comparison with the water-cooled and air-cooled V8 engine powered B.E.1 and B.E.2. Detailed design of the new aircraft was the responsibility of John Kenworthy, who drew up plans for a two-bay biplane with wings similar to those of the B.E.2, but more heavily staggered. Lateral control was by means of wing warping, while the fuselage, which was wider than that of the B.E.1 and 2 to accommodate the rotary engine, was mounted between but clear of the upper and lower wings.

Two aircraft were built in early 1912, numbered B.E.3 and B.E.4, (Note: At the time this was a form of serial number, not a type designation.) but as at the time the Royal Aircraft Factory was forbidden from building aircraft, the two aircraft were officially rebuilds of a Paulhan biplane and a Bristol Boxkite respectively, but the only parts reused were the engines.

First to fly was the B.E.3, powered by a 50 hp (37 kW) Gnome Omega engine, on 3 May 1912 with Geoffrey de Havilland at the controls. Testing was sufficiently successful for de Havilland to take several passengers up in the B.E.3 later that day, and the aircraft was delivered to the Royal Flying Corps (RFC) on 13 May 1912. The B.E.4, also initially powered by a 50 hp Gnome, flew on 24 June that year, and was handed over to the RFC on 8 August. It was re-engined with a 70 hp Gnome in September 1912. At least two, and possibly three more similar aircraft powered by 50 hp Gnomes were built in late 1912–early 1913 by private contractors.

Kenworthy modified the design to allow fitting of a more powerful (140 hp (104 kW)) two-row Gnome engine, which was built as the B.E.7, flying for the first time on 28 February 1913.

The final development of the rotary engined B.E. types was the B.E.8/8a types of 1914/15.

== Operational history ==
The B.E.3 and B.E.4, allocated the serial numbers 203 and 204 became part of the inventory of No. 3 Squadron RFC, with the B.E.3, nicknamed "Goldfish", being used for various trials, including air-to-ground signalling with both radio and lights. Two more aircraft (serial numbers 416 and 417 were delivered to the Central Flying School in December 1912, while serial number 303, which may have been similar, was delivered to No. 4 Squadron in January 1913, although wrecked in a crash in February that year. The B.E.7 was also taken on charge by the Central Flying School, serving until November 1913, at which time its engine bearers were found to be damaged by the heat of its exhaust fumes.

204 crashed on Salisbury Plain on 11 March 1914 when its rudder failed, possibly due to metal fatigue, killing its crew of two. To avoid similar failures, the remaining aircraft were fitted with modified tails based on that fitted to the H.R.E.2, this allowing the Central Flying School aircraft to remain in use until the summer of 1914.

== Operators ==
United Kingdom

- Royal Flying Corps

== Specifications (B.E.3) ==
Data from The Royal Aircraft Factory

General characteristics

- Crew: 2
- Length: 27 ft 3 in (8.31 m)
- Wingspan: 39 ft 6 in (12.04 m)
- Powerplant: 1 × Gnome rotary engine, 50 hp (37 kW)

== See also ==
Related development

- Royal Aircraft Factory B.E.2
- Royal Aircraft Factory B.E.8
