= Morane-Borel military monoplane =

1911 French single-engine prototype aircraft

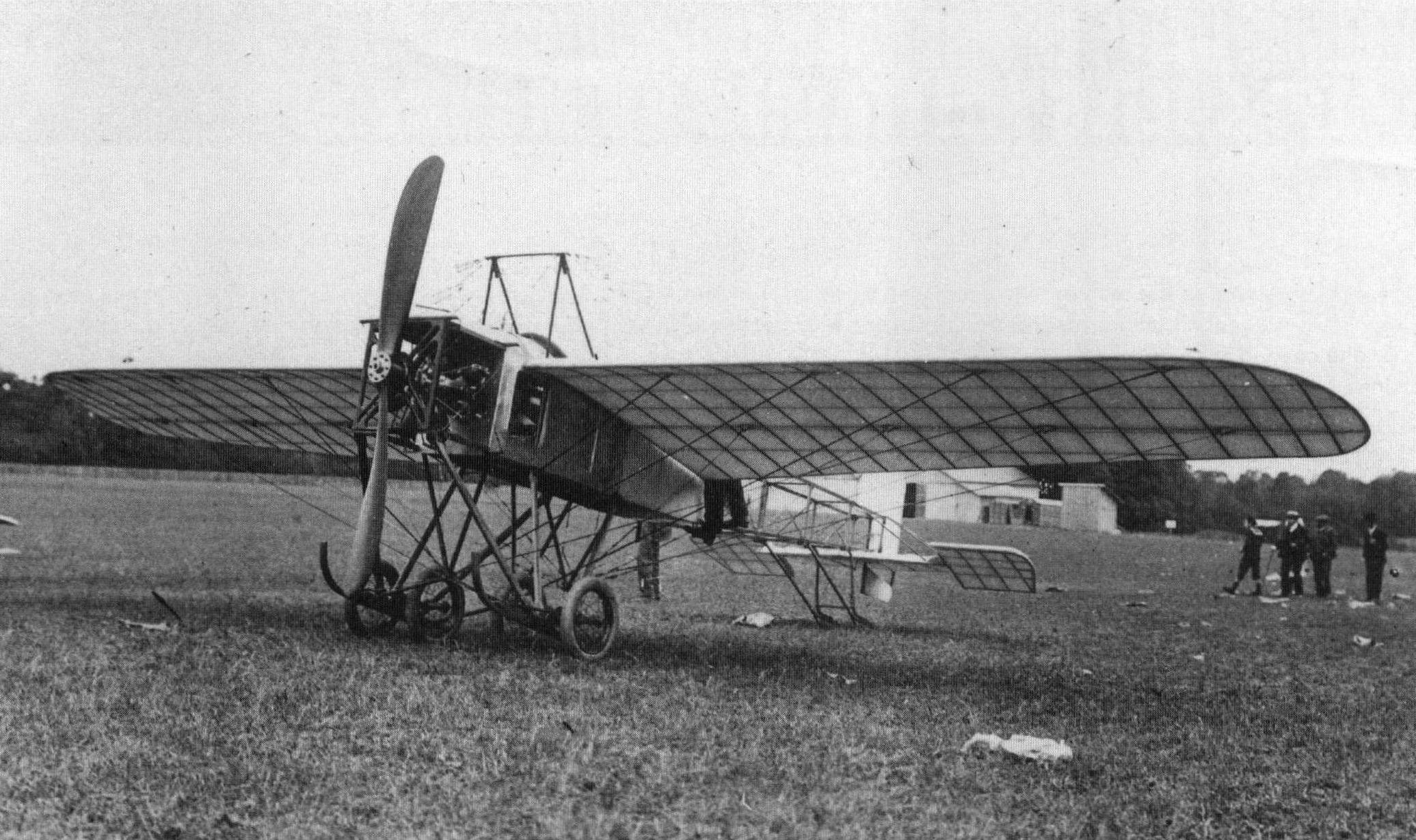
- An oblique view of the Morane-Borel military monoplane, Reims, October 1911

General information
- Type: Military plane
- Manufacturer: Morane brothers and Gabriel Borel
- Designer: Raymond Saulnier
- Number built: 1 prototype

History
- First flight: 1911

The Morane-Borel military monoplane was an unsuccessful French single-engine, multi-seat prototype aircraft built in 1911 for the Reims Military Aviation Competition hosted by the French Army. The aircraft only met one of the requirements and was eliminated from the competition.

== Design ==
The military monoplane was derived from Morane-Borel's successful single-seat monoplane, enlarged and reinforced to carry the pilot and two passengers. It was a mid-wing tractor configuration monoplane powered by a 100-horsepower (75 kW) Gnome double Omega 14-cylinder rotary engine driving a two-bladed propeller. The fuselage was a rectangular-section, wire-braced box girder, with only the forward part covered. The two-spar wings were given a trapezoidal shape, lengthened by seven ribs, and retained the elliptical ends of the earlier aircraft. The wings were braced by two pyramidal cabanes in front of the pilot, one on each side of the fuselage, and an inverted V-strut underneath the fuselage, behind the landing gear. Additional pairs of guy-wires were added to reinforce the longer wings.

Lateral control was effected by wing warping and the empennage consisted of a fixed horizontal stabilizer with tip-mounted full-chord elevators at the ends and a vertical stabilizer. The undercarriage was reinforced by the addition of an extra strut fastened to the forward end of the fuselage and consisted of two pairs of three strut assemblies, each with a pair of wheels on an axle and a skid, and a double tailskid.

== History ==
In mid-1911, the French Army decided to sponsor a competitive event to be held at Reims in October. Each aircraft would be evaluated on two criteria, their ability to take off from a plowed field and to carry three people weighing at least a total of 300 kilograms (660 lb) for a distance of 300 kilometers (190 mi) at a speed of at least 60 kilometers per hour (37 mph). The first prize was 700,000 francs plus additional sums for increases in speed over 60 km/h, as well as a commitment by the military to purchase 10 aircraft. The Morane-Borel leadership and its chief designer, Raymond Saulnier, decided to build an entry to demonstrate the principles behind its race-winning predecessor and to serve as an advertisement for the company. Piloted by Jules Védrines, the aircraft successfully took off from a wet plowed field. It flew carrying one passenger, but failed to lift the required mass due to the weight of its reinforced structure and was eliminated from the competition.

== Specifications ==
From: Lacaze & Lherbert, Morane Saulnier: ses avions, ses projets, p. 16

General characteristics

- Crew: 3
- Length: 7.8 m (25 ft 7 in)
- Wingspan: 12.3 m (40 ft 4 in)
- Wing area: 22 m^{2} (240 sq ft)
- Empty weight: 530 kg (1,168 lb)
- Gross weight: 850 kg (1,874 lb)
- Powerplant: 1 × Gnome double Omega 14-cylinder, air-cooled rotary engine , 75 kW (100 hp)

Performance

== Bibliography ==
- Hartmann, Gérard. "Le grand concours d'aviation militaire de Reims 1911" [The Reims Military Aviation Competition, 1911] (PDF). Dossiers historiques et techniques aéronautique française (in French). Gérard Hartmann.
- Lacaze, Henri & Lherbert, Claude (2013). Morane Saulnier: ses avions, ses projets [Morane Saulnier: Their Aircraft and Projects] (in French). Outreau, France: Lela Presse. ISBN 978-2-914017-70-1.
- Moulin, Jean (October 2004). "Reims 1911, le premier concours d'appareils militaires au monde!" [Reims 1911, the First Military Aircraft Concours in the World!]. Avions: Toute l'aéronautique et son histoire (in French) (139): 51–58. ISSN 1243-8650.
- Opdycke, Leonard E. (1999). French Aeroplanes before the Great War. Atglen, Pennsylvania: Schiffer Publishing. ISBN 0-7643-0752-5.
