= Morane =

Morane may refer to:

- Morane (French Polynesia), an uninhabited atoll in French Polynesia
- Morane-Borel monoplane, a French aircraft manufacturer
- Morane-Saulnier, a French aircraft manufacturer
- Bob Morane, a fictitious character of novelist Henri Vernes
- Robert and Léon Morane, the brothers who, together with Raymond Saulnier, founded the Morane-Saulnier Aircraft Company
