= Borel C.A.P. 2 =

1920s French fighter aircraft design

General information
- Type: High altitude fighter/reconnaissance
- National origin: France
- Manufacturer: Etablissements Borel
- Status: Abandoned
- Number built: 1

History
- First flight: May not have flown
- Developed from: Borel-Boccacio Type 3000

The Borel C.A.P. 2, later SGCIM C.A.P. 2, was a prototype, all-metal framed, high-altitude sesquiplane fighter and reconnaissance aircraft with a supercharged engine, built in France around 1920. It was displayed, uncovered, at the 1922 Paris Salon.

== Design and development ==
The C.A.P. 2 shared many external features with the earlier Borel-Boccacio Type 3000, or Borel C.2, a two-seat fighter tested too late for World War I, in 1919. Intended for high altitudes, the C.A.P. 2 had a wing area increased by 23% through an increase in span and was also about 1 m (3 ft 3 in) longer. However, unlike the wood-framed C.2, the C.A.P. 2 had a fabric covered all-metal duralumin structure.

It was a two-bay sesquiplane, with 4° of wing sweep and two parallel spars in each of the equal span wings, though the lower wing had 63% of the chord of the top wing. The top wing had 2° of dihedral and the lower wing none.

The C.A.P. 2 was powered by an upright, water-cooled, Hispano-Suiza V-8 engine fitted with a Rateau supercharger. Behind the engine the fuselage was flat-sided and constructed around four longerons, interconnected by frames. There were two open cockpits which were fitted with dual controls. The pilot sat forward under a cut-out in the upper wing trailing edge, and the lower wing also had a cut-out which together, increased the field of view. The rear cockpit was to the rear of the wing and was provided with a gun-ring. Dual controls allowed the gunner to take over in an emergency. The tail was conventional, with a broad-chord, triangular fin which carried a broad rudder of rounded profile which extended down to the lower longerons. Its semi-elliptical tailplane was mounted on top of the fuselage and braced from below with a pair of parallel struts. The elevators were rounded in plan, with a gap between them for rudder movement.

The fighter had a conventional fixed undercarriage with wheels on a single axle joined by rubber links to a transverse strut mounted on the lower longerons by a V-strut at each end. Its tailskid was wood, unlike the rest of the structure.

== Specifications ==
Data from Les Ailes, February 1923

General characteristics

- Crew: two
- Length: 8.17 m (26 ft 10 in)
- Upper wingspan: 13 m (42 ft 8 in)
- Height: 2.88 m (9 ft 5 in)
- Wing area: 39.9 m^{2} (429 sq ft)
- Empty weight: 1,000 kg (2,205 lb)
- Gross weight: 1,750 kg (3,858 lb)
- Fuel capacity: 325 kg (717 lb)
- Powerplant: 1 × Hispano-Suiza supercharged V-8, 220 kW (300 hp)
- Propellers: 2-bladed Pierre Lavasseur, 2.65 m (8 ft 8 in) diameter

Performance

- Maximum speed: 248 km/h (154 mph, 134 kn) at 5,000 m (16,000 ft) (estimated)
- Stall speed: 102 km/h (63 mph, 55 kn) at ground level
- Service ceiling: 10,000 m (33,000 ft) (estimated)

== See also ==
Related lists

- List of fighter aircraft
