= Bristol Coanda Biplane =

Bristol Coanda biplane may refer to number of different aircraft designed by Henri Coanda for the Bristol Aeroplane Company:

- Bristol B.R.7
- Bristol T.B.8
- Bristol P.B.8 pusher
