= Farman HF.6 =

1910s French reconnaissance aircraft

HF.6

General information
- Type: Reconnaissance aircraft
- Manufacturer: Farman
- Designer: Henri Farman

History
- First flight: June 1911

The Farman HF.6 was a reconnaissance aircraft built in France shortly before the First World War.

The HF.6 would later be developed into the more advanced Farman HF.14, which differed from the former in having a more streamlined horizontal stabilizer and an oval rudder.

== Specifications ==
Data from

General characteristics

- Crew: 2 (pilot and observer)
- Length: 9.00 m (29 ft 6 in)
- Wingspan: 11.00 m (36 ft 1 in)
- Wing area: 21 m^{2} (230 sq ft)
- Empty weight: 350 kg (772 lb)
- Max takeoff weight: 550 kg (1,213 lb)
- Powerplant: 1 × Gnome 7-cylinder air-cooled rotary piston engine, 37 kW (50 hp)
- Propellers: 2-bladed fixed-pitch wooden pusher propeller

Performance

- Maximum speed: 90 km/h (56 mph, 49 kn)
- Range: 315 km (196 mi, 170 nmi)
- Wing loading: 26.1 kg/m^{2} (5.3 lb/sq ft)
- Power/mass: 0.09 hp/kg

== Bibliography ==
- Liron, Jean (1984). Les avions Farman. Collection Docavia. Vol. 21. Paris: Éditions Larivière. OCLC 37146471.
