= Borel hydro-monoplane =

1910s French seaplane

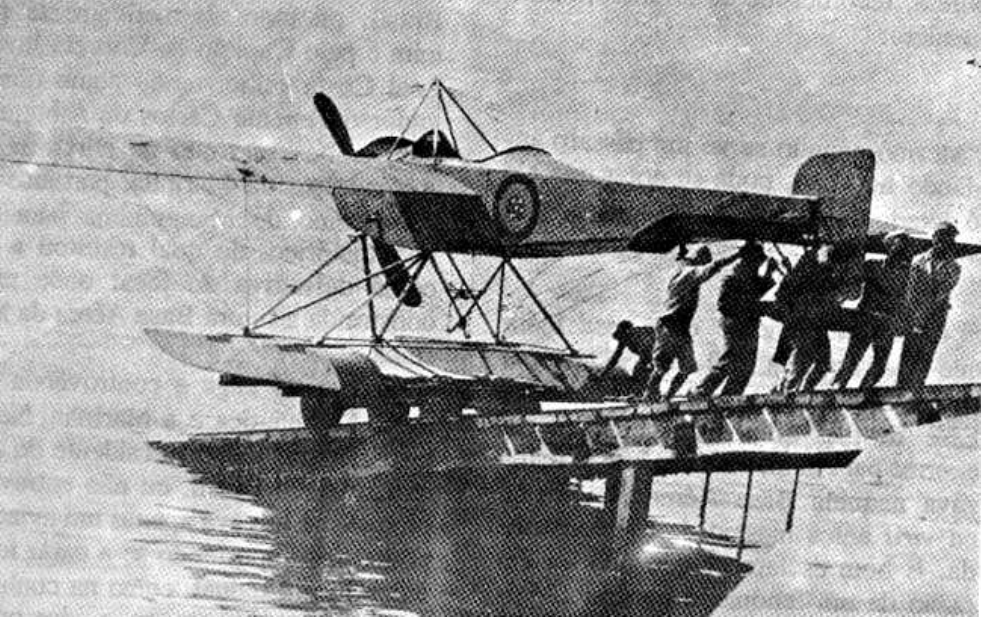

General information
- Type: Seaplane
- National origin: France
- Manufacturer: Etablissements Borel

History
- First flight: 1912
- Developed from: Morane-Borel monoplane

The Borel Hydro-monoplane (also called Bo.8) was a French seaplane produced in 1912.

== Design and development ==
The Borel hydro-monoplane, which was developed from the 1911 Morane-Borel monoplane, was a tractor monoplane powered by an 80 hp Gnome Lambda rotary engine. The rectangular section fuselage tapered to a vertical knife-edge at the rear: at the front the longerons on each side were curved inwards, meeting at the front engine bearer. A curved aluminium cowling covered the top of the engine, and the sides of the fuselage were covered with aluminium as far aft as the rear of the cockpit. The two seats were arranged in tandem, with the pilot sitting in front. Dual controls were fitted. Tail surfaces consisted of a narrow-chord fixed horizontal surface with a much broader elevator with horn balances hinged to the trailing edge and a balanced rudder which extended below the sternpost and carried a small float. The main undercarriage consisted of a pair of unstepped flat-bottomed floats. Lateral control was by wing warping.

== Operational history ==
An example was entered in the 1913 Schneider Trophy competition, but crashed during the elimination trials.

Another example, flown by George Chemet, was the winner of the 1913 Paris-Deauville race.

== Operators ==
Italy

- Corpo Aeronautico Militare

United Kingdom

- Royal Naval Air Service

Brazil

- Brazilian Naval Aviation
- Military Police of Paraná State

== Specifications ==
Data from Flight, 26 July 1913, p. 814

General characteristics

- Crew: one
- Capacity: one passenger
- Length: 8.38 m (27 ft 6 in)
- Wingspan: 11.68 m (38 ft 4 in)
- Wing area: 18 m^{2} (190 sq ft)
- Powerplant: 1 × Gnome Lambda 7-cylinder rotary engine, 60 kW (80 hp)
- Propellers: 2-bladed, 2.59 m (8 ft 6 in) diameter
