= Établissements Borel =

Aircraft manufacturer in Paris

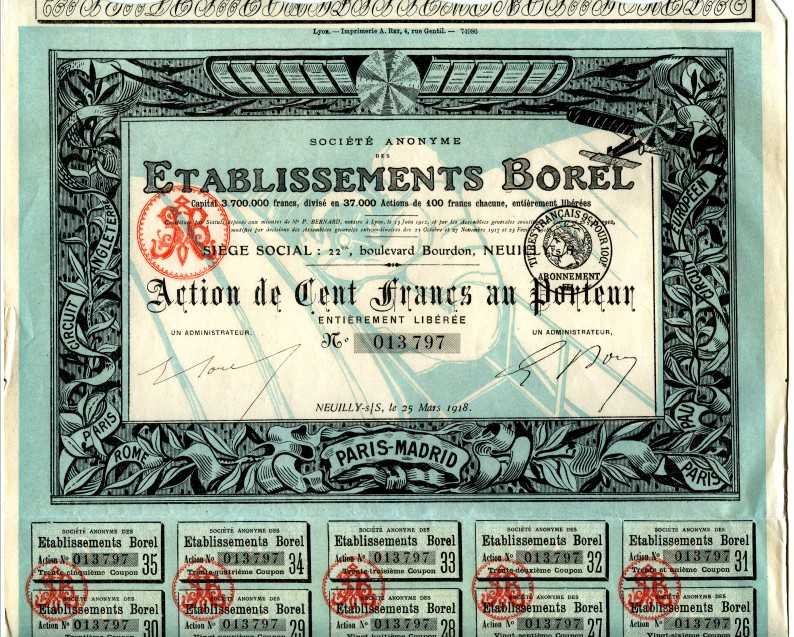
Borel share certificate of 1918

Etablissements Borel was a French aircraft manufacturer of the early twentieth century. It was founded by Gabriel Borel (1880–?1960) and manufactured a number of monoplane designs between 1909 and 1914. The factory, located at Mourmelon was temporarily forced to close when the outbreak of World War I saw most of its workers conscripted into the army, but Borel re-opened in November 1915 to produce military aircraft for France under licence from other manufacturers including Caudron, Nieuport and SPAD. In 1918, Borel was restructured as the Société Générale des Constructions Industrielles et Mécaniques (SGCIM) and attempted to re-market one of its torpedo bomber designs as a civil transport. However, neither this nor two new-generation fighter designs were able to keep the company in business.

== History ==
Borel founded the company in late 1910, initially based in Neuilly and then Puteaux. The precise legal relationship with the Morane brothers and Raymond Saulnier isn't known, but the company built several aircraft designed by Saulnier in 1910–1911 before the collaboration ended in late 1911.

== Aircraft ==
- Morane-Borel monoplane
- Morane-Borel military monoplane
- Borel hydro-monoplane
- Borel Bo.11
- Borel military monoplane
- Borel Torpille
- Borel-Odier Bo-T
