= Lowe Marlburian =

Marlburian

General information
- Type: Two-seat monoplane
- National origin: United Kingdom
- Manufacturer: Northern Aerial Transport Company
- Designer: F. Harold Lowe
- Number built: 1

History
- First flight: 1922

The Lowe Marlburian was a 1920s British two-seat monoplane design by F. Harold Lowe.

== Design and development ==
The Marlburian was a two-seat braced monoplane powered by a Gnome rotary engine. It was built during 1921 by Lowe at Heaton near Newcastle upon Tyne. The seventh aircraft built by a 20-year-old Lowe, it took 840 hours to build the aircraft, with everything but the engine, wheels, propeller and instruments being made from raw materials. The two occupants sat side by side. It was registered G-EBEX on 7 October 1922, the aircraft crashed on 25 November 1922.

== Specifications ==
Data from Flight

General characteristics

- Crew: 2
- Length: 17 ft 0 in (5.18 m)
- Wingspan: 28 ft 6 in (8.69 m)
- Height: 8 ft 4 in (2.54 m)
- Wing area: 107 sq ft (9.9 m^{2})
- Empty weight: 450 lb (204 kg)
- Powerplant: 1 × Gnome rotary engine , 60 hp (45 kW)

Performance

- Maximum speed: 100 mph (160 km/h, 87 kn)
- Cruise speed: 85 mph (137 km/h, 74 kn)
- Stall speed: 33 mph (53 km/h, 29 kn)
