= Nieuport-Macchi Parasol =

- A Nieuport-Macchi Parasol in 1913.

General information
- Type: Observation aircraft
- National origin: Italy
- Manufacturer: Nieuport-Macchi
- Primary user: Royal Italian Army Corpo Aeronautico Militare
- Number built: 42

History
- Introduction date: 1914
- First flight: 1913
- Retired: November 1915
- Developed from: Nieuport IV

The Nieuport-Macchi Parasol was a single-engine observation aircraft produced by the Italian aeronautical company Nieuport-Macchi in the early 1910s. It was the first aircraft designed independently by Macchi, which until then had only produced aircraft under license. The Parasol operated in front-line service in 1915 during the early stages of Italy's participation in World War I.

== Development history ==
The Nieuport-Macchi company was established in 1912 as a licensed manufacturer of aircraft built by the French Nieuport company. Its main product was the Nieuport IV, a two-seater monoplane sold for both civil and military use. As in other monoplanes, the Nieuport IV's wing obstructed the downward view of the pilot and any observer, so to solve that problem in a new aircraft, Nieuport-Macchi designers placed the wing above the fuselage following the so-called "sun visor" scheme, or as it was known in France at the time, the "parasol wing" design, hence the new aircraft's name, Nieuport-Macchi Parasol. Nieuport-Macchi derived other construction details of the Parasol from the Nieuport IV already in production: Mainly of wood construction covered by canvas, the Parasol had an 80-horsepower (60 kW) Gnome 7 Lambda seven-cylinder air-cooled rotary engine driving a helical wooden two-bladed fixed-pitch propeller. It had bicycle landing gear with a rear skid. As in similar monoplanes of the era, the Parasol had no ailerons and instead used wing warping to control roll. The Parasol made its first successful flight in 1913, and mass production followed.

== Operational history ==
Taking off from the airfield at Mirafiori with test pilot Clemente Maggiora at the controls, a Parasol set the Italian height record for an aircraft with two people on board in December 1914, reaching an altitude of 2,700 metres (8,858 ft).

With Italy's entry into World War I looming, the Royal Italian Army was looking for new equipment, and Nieuport-Macchi proposed the Parasol for use by the army's Servizio Aeronautico Militare ("Military Aviation Service"), which on 7 January 1915 became the Corpo Aeronautico Militare ("Military Aviation Corps"). The army judged the Parasol robust and easy to dismantle, so it approved construction of the aircraft and ordered enough Parasols to equip two artillery-spotting squadrons.

On 23 May 1915, Italy entered World War I on the side of the Allies with its declaration of war on Austria-Hungary. On 26 May 1915, the first Parasol squadron, the 2nd Artillery Squadron, was created, equipped with six Parasols. In June 1915, the squadron deployed from Pordenone to Medeuzza, a hamlet in San Giovanni al Natisone in northeastern Italy, to provide artillery observation support to the Italian Third Army as it fought in the trenches at Gorizia and on the Karst Plateau during the First Battle of the Isonzo. In the following months, the Parasols conducted several reconnaissance missions and even engaged in some sporadic bombing, with poor results. The Parasols eventually were equipped with a Rouzet radio transmitter.

On 24 September 1915, a second Parasol squadron, the 3rd Artillery Squadron, was formed, equipped with four Parasols.

Although the Parasol's parasol wing gave its crew better downward visibility than in other monoplanes, allowing for good photographic shots, the plane was not very stable and was difficult to fly, so much so that many accidents occurred. The high accident rate, together with the impossibility of the Parasol reaching sufficient altitude to escape the fire of anti-aircraft guns, prompted the retirement of the Parasol from service in November 1915.

== Operators ==
Kingdom of Italy

- Royal Italian Army
  - Corpo Aeronautico Militare

== Specifications ==
Data from Abate, Lazzati. 1963, p. 21.

General characteristics

- Crew: 2
- Length: 7.20 m (23 ft 7 in)
- Wingspan: 13.00 m (42 ft 8 in)
- Height: 3.10 m (10 ft 2 in)
- Wing area: 24.0 m^{2} (258 sq ft)
- Empty weight: 400 kg (882 lb)
- Gross weight: 600 kg (1,323 lb)
- Powerplant: 1 × Gnome 7 Lambda 7-cylinder air-cooled rotary piston engine, 60 kW (80 hp)
- Propellers: 2-bladed helical fixed-pitch

Performance

- Maximum speed: 125 km/h (78 mph, 67 kn)
- Stall speed: 70 km/h (43 mph, 38 kn)
- Range: 400 km (250 mi, 220 nmi)
- Service ceiling: 2,700 m (8,900 ft)
- Time to altitude: 26 min to 2,000 m (6,600 ft)
