= Bristol Coanda Monoplanes =

Bristol-Coanda Monoplanes
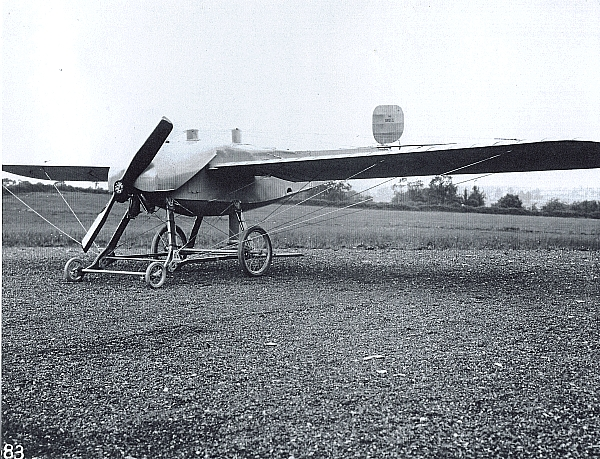

General information
- Type: Trainer
- Manufacturer: Bristol Aeroplane Company
- Designer: Henri Coandă
- Number built: 37

History
- First flight: 1912
- Variant: Bristol TB.8

The Bristol Coanda Monoplanes were a series of monoplane trainers designed by the Romanian designer Henri Coandă for the British company British and Colonial Aeroplane Company.

Several versions of the plane were built from 1912 onwards with both tandem and side-by-side cockpits. Several were purchased by the War Office for use as trainers by the Royal Flying Corps. International purchases were by Italy and Romania. One example survives in the Gianni Caproni Museum of Aeronautics, Trento, Italy.

== Design and development ==
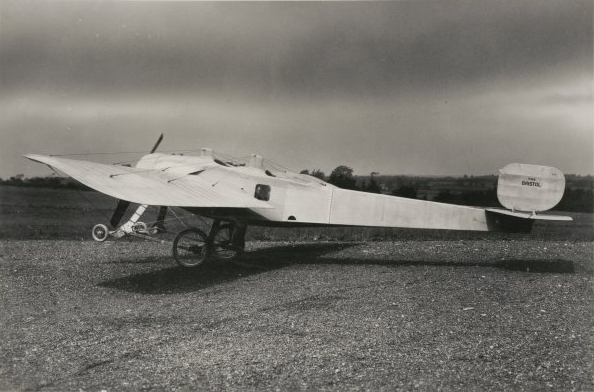
A Bristol Coanda in 1912

The Romanian aircraft designer Henri Coandă joined Bristol in January 1912. His first design for Bristol was a two-seat monoplane trainer, a development of the Bristol Prier Monoplane, controlled by wing warping. The first prototype flew in March 1912. A series of similar aircraft followed with both tandem and side-by-side cockpits, known as the School Monoplane and the Side by Side Monoplane.

A more powerful derivative was built for a competition to provide aircraft for the British War Office. Two aircraft, known as Competition Monoplanes were built and entered into the competition, together with two Bristol Gordon England biplanes. The aircraft were flown by Harry Busteed, Bristol's test pilot and James Valentine.

These did well in the competition, rated equal fifth and were described at the time as "well-designed and well-constructed" though criticised as "heavy for the wing area" and lacking in power. This resulted in their being purchased by the War Office for use as trainers by the Royal Flying Corps. These two aircraft formed the basis for a revised military trainer, the Military Monoplane, which had increased wingspan.

The Military Monoplane later formed the basis for the Bristol TB.8, several being rebuilt into TB8s.

== Operational history ==
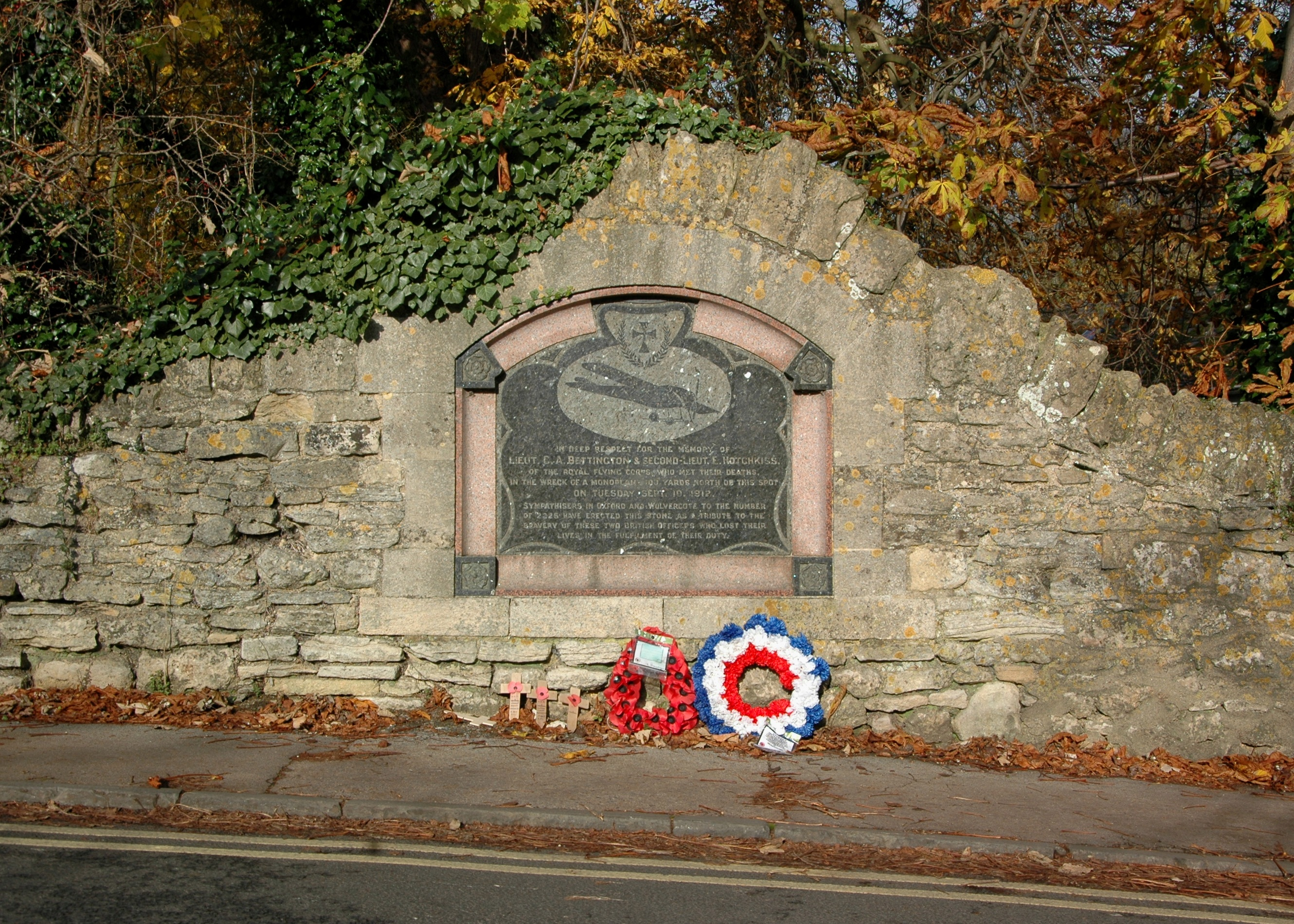
Monument in Wolvercote, Oxfordshire to Lieutenants Edward Hotchkiss and Claude Bettington, killed in a Bristol Coanda crash in 1912

The first School and Side by Side monoplanes entered service with flying schools operated by Bristol at Larkhill and Brooklands. One tandem and two side-by-side machines were sold to Italy, with four tandem and three side-by-side aircraft being sold to Romania.

The two Competition Monoplanes were bought by the War Office after the Military Aircraft Competition, being used as trainers for the RFC. However, on 10 September 1912, one of the Competition Monoplanes crashed on Godstow Road, Lower Wolvercote, Oxfordshire, killing Lieutenants Edward Hotchkiss and Claude Bettington. While this was traced to one of the bracing wires becoming detached, it resulted in a five-month ban of flying of all monoplanes by the military wing of the RFC.

Despite this ban, Military Monoplanes were purchased by Romania and Italy, with a production license being granted to Caproni (although this license was later cancelled, only two being built by Caproni).

== Variants ==
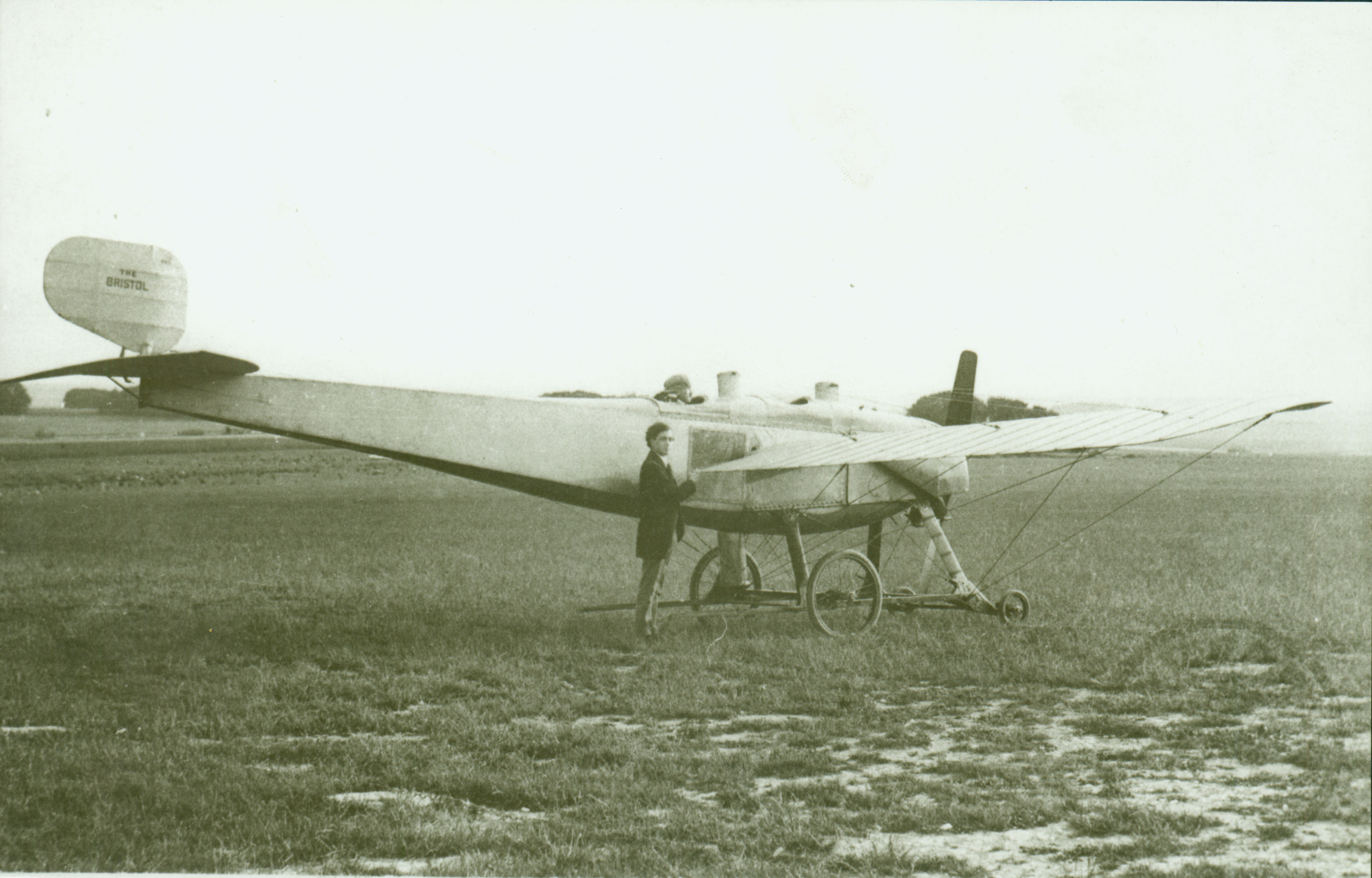
A Bristol Coanda in 1912

School Monoplane
Trainer aircraft with tandem cockpits. Powered by 50 hp (40 kW) Gnome engine. Six built.
Side by Side Monoplane
Trainer aircraft with side-by-side cockpit. Powered by 50 hp (40 kW) Gnome engine. Six built.
Competition Monoplane
Two aircraft built for War Office Military Aeroplane Competition. Powered by 80 hp (60 kW) Gnome engine.
Daimler Monoplane
Single aircraft powered by 70 hp (50 kW) Daimler engine. Overweight and unsuccessful.
Military Monoplane
Improved development of Competition Monoplane with increased wingspan. Powered by 80 hp (60 kW) Gnome engine. 21 built.

== Operators ==
Kingdom of Italy

- Corpo Aeronautico Militare

Romania

- Romanian Air Corps

United Kingdom

- Royal Flying Corps

== Aircraft on display ==
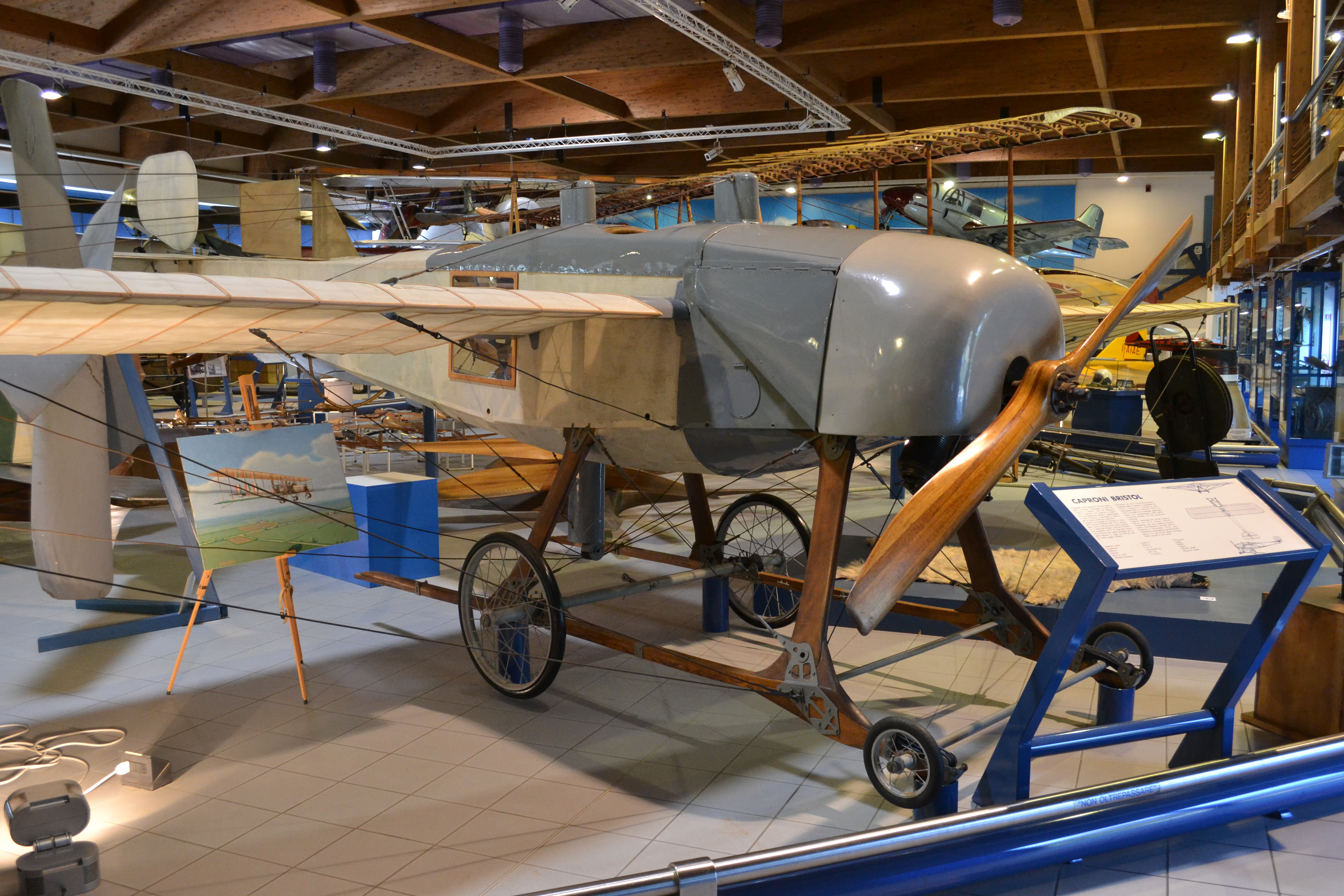
Caproni Bristol monoplane in the Gianni Caproni Museum of Aeronautics, Trento, Italy

A single Bristol Coanda Monoplane survives, in the Gianni Caproni Museum of Aeronautics, Trento, Italy, being the oldest surviving Bristol aircraft still in existence. This aircraft was a pattern aircraft sent to Caproni as a basis for their licensed production., never being flown, but was restored to a complete example for display at the museum

== Specifications (military) ==

Data from Bristol Aircraft Since 1910

General characteristics

- Crew: 2
- Length: 29 ft 3 in (8.92 m)
- Wingspan: 37 ft 8 in (11.48 m)
- Wing area: 450 sq ft (42 m^{2})
- Empty weight: 970 lb (440 kg)
- Gross weight: 1,665 lb (755 kg)
- Powerplant: 1 × Gnome Lambda 7-cylinder air-cooled rotary piston engine, 80 hp (60 kW)
- Propellers: 2-bladed fixed-pitch propeller

Performance

- Maximum speed: 65–70 mph (105–113 km/h, 56–61 kn)
- Endurance: 5 hours
- Time to altitude: 3,000 ft (914 m) in 11 minutes

Armament

- Guns: Some were equipped with a 7.92 mm (0.312 in) calibre machine gun
- Bombs: 12 x 10 lb (4.5 kg) light bombs

== See also ==
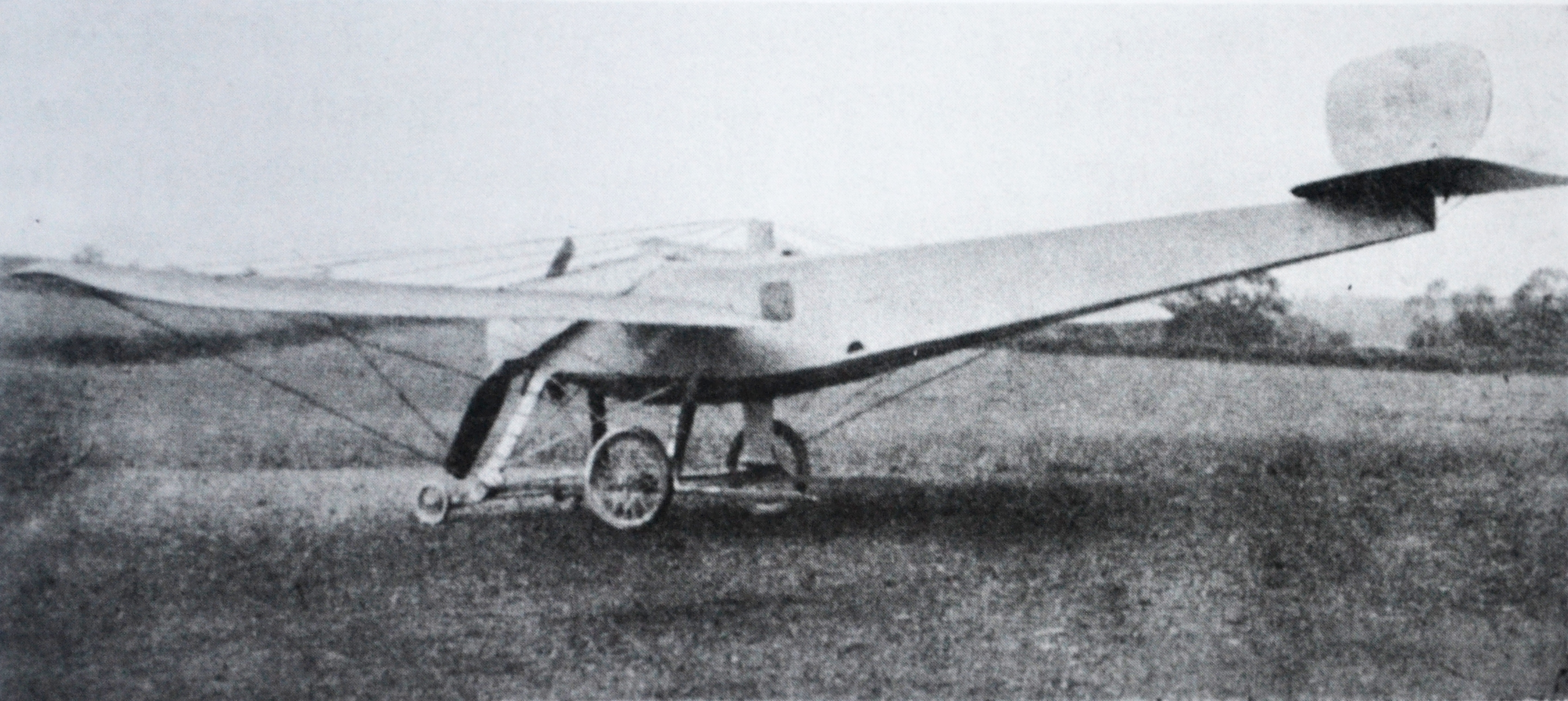
A Caproni-Bristol aircraft in 1913

Related development

- Bristol TB.8
