= Borel Bo.11 =

1910s French light aircraft

Bo.11

General information
- Type: Two-seat general purpose monoplane
- National origin: France
- Manufacturer: Etablissements Borel
- Primary user: French Air Force

History
- First flight: 1911

The Borel Bo.11 (commonly known as the Bo.11) was a French two-seat general purpose monoplane designed and built by Etablissements Borel.

== Design and development ==
The Bo.11 was mid-wing monoplane from 1911 with wire-braced wings and lateral control by wing warping. It was powered by a 52 kW (70 hp) Gnome rotary piston engine. The Bo.11 served with the Aéronautique Militaire at military air training schools and at a civil flying school at Buc. The aircraft could be fitted with twin floats.

== Retirement ==
The Bo.11 was gradually withdrawn from front-line and training service between 1913 and the early years of World War I as more capable aircraft became available. The French Army increasingly needed aircraft capable of reconnaissance, artillery spotting, and carrying observers and equipment. The Bo.11 had been designed primarily as a trainer and general-purpose aircraft, making it less suitable for wartime operational roles. As improved training aircraft entered service, there was little reason to retain it except in secondary roles.

== Specifications ==
Data from The Illustrated Encyclopedia of Aircraft

General characteristics

- Crew: 2
- Length: 6.70 m (21 ft 11.75 in)
- Wingspan: 9.60 m (31 ft 6 in)
- Height: 2.50 m (8 ft 2.5 in)
- Powerplant: 1 × Gnome rotary piston engine , 52 kW (70 hp)

Performance

- Maximum speed: 90 km/h (56 mph, 49 kn)
- Cruise speed: 70 km/h (43 mph, 37 kn)

== See also ==
Aircraft of comparable role, configuration, and era

- Blériot XI-2

Related lists

- List of flying boats and floatplanes
