= Borel military monoplane =

French single-engine, two-seat aircraft

Borel Military Type Monoplane
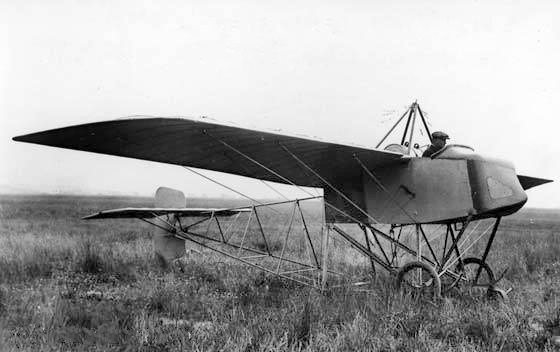

General information
- Type: Anti-balloon fighter
- Manufacturer: Etablissements Borel
- Number built: 1

History
- First flight: 1913

The Borel military monoplane (company designation: Bo.14) was a French single-engine, two-seat aircraft designed shortly before World War I in response to a French Army requirement for an aircraft to seek and destroy enemy balloon airships.

== Design and development ==
The Military Monoplane had an unconventional design, owing to its unique mission requirement. The pilot and observer sat side by side in an open cockpit within a pod or nacelle that also carried a high monoplane wing and the engine driving a pusher propeller. The pod also featured windows on each side, near the crew members' feet to facilitate downwards visibility when hunting balloons. A cruciform empennage was carried on an open truss of triangular cross-section, the upper longeron of which passed through the propeller hub. Despite reportedly good flying characteristics, the idea never passed beyond the construction of a single prototype.

== Specifications ==
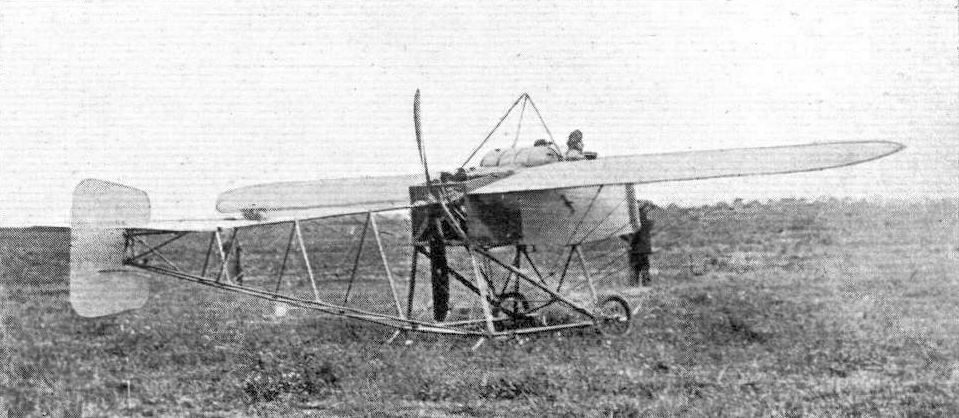
Rear view showing the pusher propeller arrangement.

General characteristics

- Crew: two, pilot and observer
- Length: 7.52 m (24 ft 8 in)
- Wingspan: 11.58 m (38 ft 0 in)
- Height: 3.00 m (9 ft 10 in)
- Wing area: 19.1 m^{2} (205 sq ft)
- Powerplant: 1 × Gnome air-cooled rotary piston engine , 37 kW (50 hp)

Performance

== Bibliography ==
- Taylor, Michael J. H. (1989). Jane's Encyclopedia of Aviation. London: Studio Editions. p. 193.
- "Flightglobal Archive"., archived at: The Wayback Machine
- Aero and Hydro September 13, 1913
