= Bristol P.B.8 =

P.B.8

General information
- Type: Trainer
- Manufacturer: Bristol Aeroplane Company
- Designer: Henri Coandă
- Number built: 1

History
- Retired: 1914

The Bristol P.B.8, or Bristol-Coanda P.B.8', was an early British-built, Romanian-designed two-seat biplane trainer made by the Bristol Aeroplane Company in 1914. Only one was completed, which was never flown.

== Design and development ==
Romanian Henri Coandă, chief designer of the Bristol Aeroplane Company, developed the P.B.8 as a biplane trainer to replace the early Bristol Boxkite at the Bristol flying school at Brooklands, it was the only biplane designed by Coanda. It was small biplane with equal span wings with ailerons on both the upper and lower wings. The small cockpit had room for two in tandem, although access to the rear seat was restricted by the upper wing. It inherited an unusual four-wheel landing gear from other Coanda designs like the T.B.8. The aircraft was powered by an 80 hp (60 kW) Gnome Lambda engine fitted at the rear of the cockpit nacelle and driving a pusher propeller.

The design was started November 1913 but its construction was a low priority for the company and the completed aircraft was not delivered to Brooklands until July 1914. The Gnome engine was requisitioned by the war office and removed from the aircraft before it had a chance to fly.

== Specifications (T.B.8) ==
Data from Bristol Aircraft Since 1910

General characteristics

- Crew: 2
- Length: 27 ft 6 in (8.38 m)
- Upper wingspan: 27 ft 6 in (8.38 m)
- Lower wingspan: 27 ft 6 in (8.38 m)
- Powerplant: 1 × Gnome Lambda 7-cyl. air-cooled rotary piston engine, 80 hp (60 kW)
