= Borel-Odier Bo-T =

French WW1 bomber aircraft

Bo.T
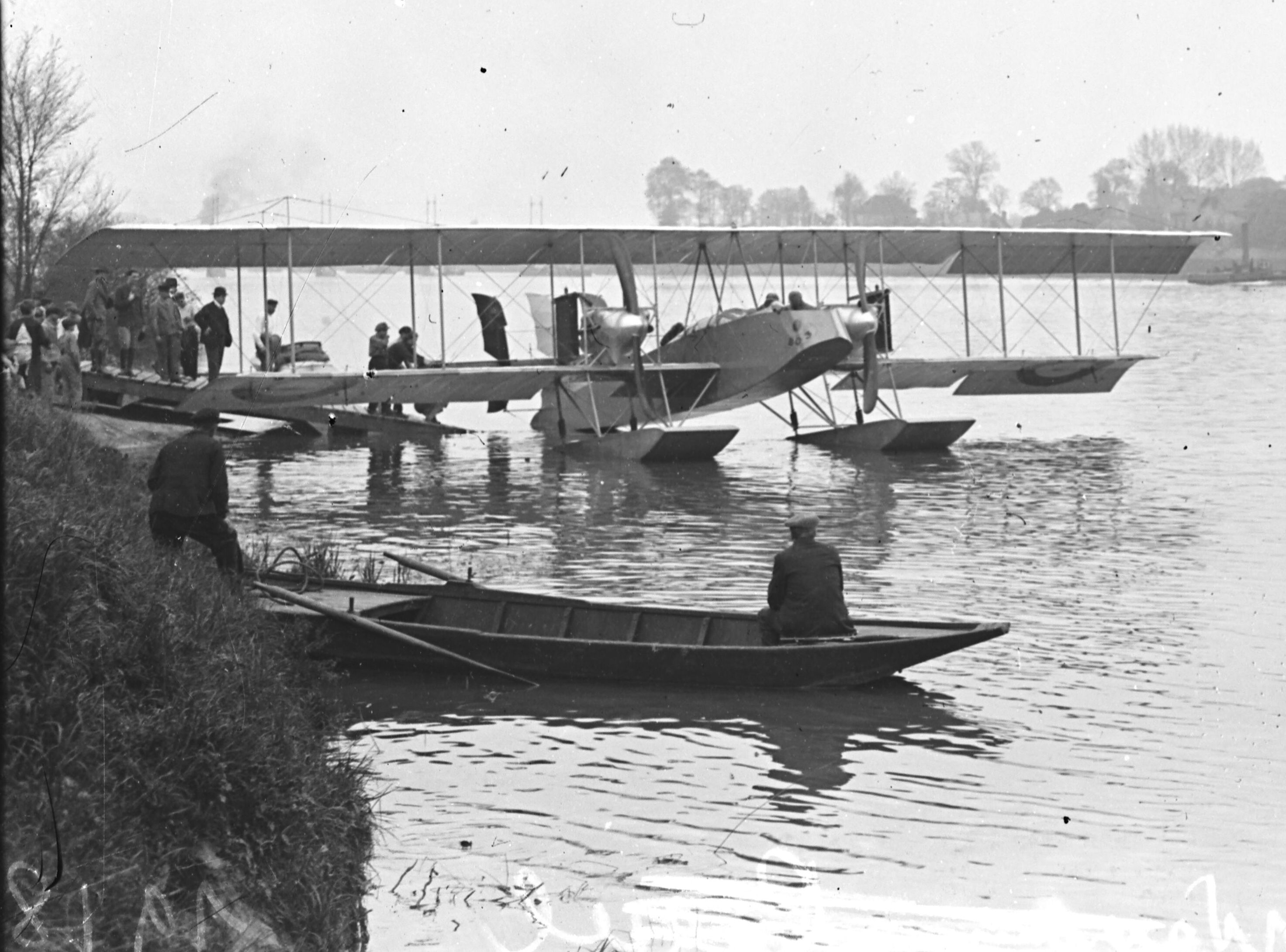

General information
- Type: Torpedo-reconnaissance floatplane
- National origin: France
- Manufacturer: Antoine Odier
- Designer: Etablissements Borel
- Primary user: French Navy
- Number built: 92

History
- First flight: 1916

The Borel-Odier Bo-T (also known as the Borel-Odier torpedo floatplane or B.O.2) was a French twin-engined float biplane designed by Borel but built by Antoine Odier for the French Navy.

== Design and development ==
The Bo-T was a biplane powered by two 164 kW (220 hp) Hispano-Suiza 8Ba inline piston engines and fitted with twin floats. It had room under the fuselage for a torpedo. The prototype was destroyed on the first flight in August 1916 but the French Navy still placed and order for 91 aircraft. Deliveries did not start until 1917 and were stopped when the Armistice was signed. Only a few aircraft saw operational use on coastal patrols in the mediterranean.

In 1919 a ten-passenger transport variant was flown designated Bo-C/Bo.20 but it was destroyed during testing.

== Variants ==
Bo-T
Torpedo-reconnaissance floatplane
Bo-C
Ten-passenger transport variant of the Bo-T
Bo.19
Three-seat floatplane, powered by 400 hp Liberty engine; never built

== Operators ==
France

- French Navy

== Specifications (Bo-T) ==
Data from The Illustrated Encyclopedia of Aircraft, French aircraft of the First World War

General characteristics

- Crew: 4
- Length: 11.23 m (36 ft 10 in)
- Wingspan: 20 m (65 ft 7 in)
- Height: 3.93 m (12 ft 11 in)
- Wing area: 80 m^{2} (860 sq ft)
- Empty weight: 1,200 kg (2,646 lb)
- Gross weight: 2,400 kg (5,291 lb)
- Powerplant: 2 × Hispano-Suiza 8Ba V-8 water-cooled piston engines, 160 kW (220 hp) each
- Propellers: 2-bladed fixed-pitch propellers

Performance

- Maximum speed: 124 km/h (77 mph, 67 kn) at sea level
- Range: 520 km (320 mi, 280 nmi)

Armament

- Guns: 2x 7.7 mm (0.303 in) Lewis machine guns on flexible mounts in front an rear cockpits
- Bombs: 1 × 650 kg (1,430 lb) Torpedo

== See also ==
Related lists

- List of flying boats and floatplanes

== Bibliography ==
- Cortet, Pierre (December 2001). "Rétros du Mois" [Retros of the Month]. Avions: Toute l'Aéronautique et son histoire (in French) (105): 7. ISSN 1243-8650.
