= Marcel Brindejonc des Moulinais =

French aviator (1892–1916)

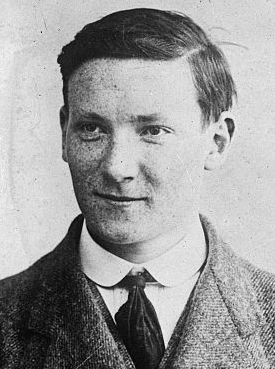
- Born: 18 February 1892; Plérin
- Died: 18 August 1916 (aged 24); Vadelaincourt, France
- Education: College of Saint-Servan, University of Rennes
- Military career
- Allegiance: France
- Branch: aviation
- Service years: 1914 - 1916
- Unit: Squadron DO 22
- Awards: Legion of Honour, Croix de Guerre

Marcel-Georges Brindejonc des Moulinais (18 February 1892 – 18 August 1916) was a French aviator best known for long-distance flights, including crossing the Baltic Sea. He also flew as an exhibition and racing pilot. He flew reconnaissance missions during the battle of the Marne.

== Early life ==
Brindejonc des Moulinais was born in Plérin, Côtes-d'Armor, the son of Jean-Georges Brindejonc des Moulinais and Blanche-Marie-Amélie Merlin. He was educated by the Institute of the Brothers of the Christian Schools, and then the college of Saint-Servan in Ille-et-Vilaine. From 1901 to 1912 he lived at "Le clos linden" at 41 rue Saint-Guillaume in Pleurtuit. His summer vacations were spent mostly with his cousins at Pleurtuit Val, near where his parents owned Pontouraude. In 1910 he attended the University of Rennes.

== Aviation career ==
Marcel Brindejonc des Moulinais c. 1910

His interest in flying started at Dinan and Dinard during the summer of 1909. In December 1910 he bought an aircraft from Alberto Santos-Dumont, and then enrolled at a flying school at Pau, gaining his pilot's license (No. 448) on 13 March 1911. In June, he participated in the meeting at Abbeville in a Blériot monoplane. He then bought a Morane-Borel monoplane and started entering flying competitions, participating in exhibitions in Pau, Toulouse, Carcassonne, Perpignan, and Foix. In July, he returned to Paris, and was given a job as a pilot by Morane. The same month he was injured when he made a forced landing in a stoneyard at Billancourt. This accident prevented him from taking part in the 1911 Daily Mail Circuit of Britain Air Race.

He quickly became a well known pilot, appearing at the Aude) aviation meeting in February 1912. In June 1912 he took part in the competition for the grand prize of the Aero-Club de France): seven circuits between Angers, Cholet and Saumur, a total of (1,1002 km): three laps to be made on the first day and the rest on the second day. Owing to poor weather few pilots attempted to take off on the first day. Garros was the only competitor to finish the necessary three laps. Brindejonc was the only other pilot to complete the second lap; although he did complete the third lap, his arrival at 7,34 was too late to qualify by four minutes. On the second day a Garros completed the four laps necessary to secure the main prize, while a three-lap race was held for all the remaining pilots, in which Brindejonc finished third. On 8 August 1912, he made an unsuccessful attempt to win the Pommery cup with a flight from Paris to Berlin. A mechanical failure in Westphalia stopped him.

1913 was his most successful year. His trip from Paris to London, Brussels and returning to Paris (1,040 km 650 mi) in a Morane-Saulnier C monoplane, with double crossing of the Channel) took place between 25 and 27 February 1913. During his tour Paris–Bordeaux–Burgos–Madrid–Barcelona to Perpignan Lyon Paris from 24 March to 12 April 1913, weather conditions were harsh: "What a terrible trip! How I suffered! One can not imagine!" he wrote.

The Pommery Cup was awarded twice a year (on April 30 and October 31) between 1909 and 1913 to the aviator who traveled the greatest distance in one day. Brindejonc des Moulinais made several unsuccessful attempts to win in 1912 and 1913: Paris–Berlin on 8 August 1912, Berlin–Villacoublay on 18 October 1912, attempted the impossible after the blessing of Morane-Saulnier at Villacoublay by the Bishop of Versailles on 22 October 1912, Paris–Münster on 29 April 1913, Bremen–Brussels–London from 9 to 11 May 1913. The last flight caused trouble for Brindejonc, since he flew over London on his approach to Hendon. As a result, he became the first person to be prosecuted under the 1913 Aerial Navigation Act.

Maurice Guillaux, a previous winner of the Pommery Cup had claimed to have covered 1,386 km on 23 August 1913, this distance was not ratified after Brindejonc de Moulinais appealed: the claim was the result of a mistake over where he had landed. Guillaux was banned from flying in the competition for ten years. Marcel Brindejonc won the cup with a flight made on 10 June 1913 of 1,382. km (distance approved at a speed of 170 km) in a Morane-Saulnier H monoplane leaving Paris Villacoublay at 3.37 and arriving in Warsaw in 14 hours, 18 minutes. At the time, the Poles were very fond of France, and a large reception was given to honor the aviator. From Poland, he continued, making a circuit of the capitals of Northern Europe of just over 4,800&km (3,000 mi) between 10 June and 2 July 1913: to Dwinsk on 15 June, Saint Petersburg on 17 June, Reval (23 June) - Stockholm (25 June) - Copenhagen (29 June) - The Hague (1 July) and arriving back at Paris on 2 July. To cross the 300 km of the Baltic Sea, eight destroyers from the Russian navy were placed every eighteen miles between the island and the Swedish capital. The reception was everywhere triumphant. The ovation was outstanding Villacoublay, where he arrived a little after four o'clock in the afternoon, escorted by three aircraft flown by colleagues. He was received at City Hall from Paris. Newspapers around the world praised the courage of the young Breton. Many letters of congratulation were simply addressed to "Brindejonc des Moulinais, France".

In April 1914 he competed in the Monaco Aerial Rally, in which contestants had to complete any of seven approved 1,283 km (797 mi) routes to Monaco, each including a 200 km (120 mi) leg by floatplane between 1 and 15 April. Brindejonc started from Madrid on 2 April, reaching Marseilles that evening, completing the course the following morning. His time for the course was 16 hrs. 2 mins. 28 secs. On 5 April he set off from Monaco for Genoa

== Awards ==
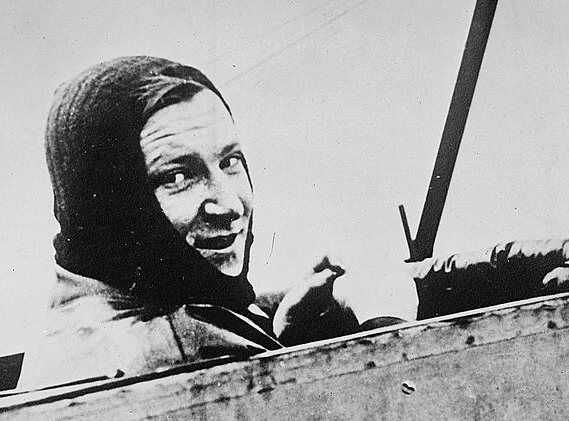

- Legion of Honour, awarded on 11 August 1913, becoming (at 21) the youngest holder of the honour.
- The gold medal of the Aero-Club de France, awarded on 3 July 1913.
- The Medal of the Academy of Sport, awarded on 23 December 1913.
- The Order of Sainte-Anne, He had been decorated at Saint Petersburg (by the Grand Duke Alexander)
- The Order of Gustav Vasa Stockholm
- The Order of Daneborg Copenhagen (30 June by the king of Denmark.

On 20 July 1913 he won the match against Mauritius and Edmond Audemars Guillaux to Juvisy-sur-Orge, for the Essorprize, a speed climbing competition organized by the newspaper L'Auto. On 12 August 1913, he traveled without incident thousand kilometers from Marseilles to Dinard, through Albi and Poitiers. 1 September he flew to Dinard in Deauville and won Nantes Royan and Agen (845 km). From 27 to 29 September 1913, during the events of the Gordon-Bennett Trophy at Reims, he placed second in the altitude competition with a passenger.

== Military career ==
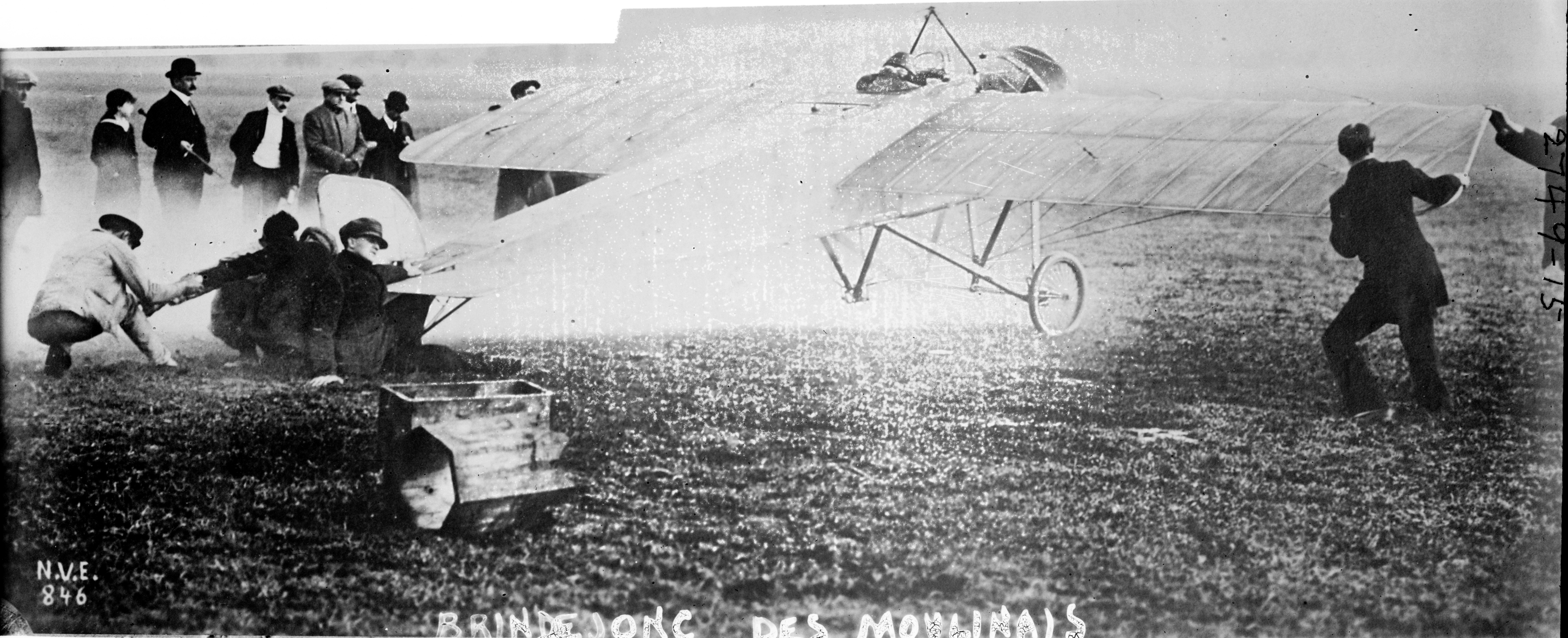

Called to military service, he enlisted on 10 October 1913 in the 1st Aviation Group at Versailles. On 10 April 1914 he was promoted to corporal, and assigned to the 2nd Aviation Group, based at Lyon. On 4 August 1914 he joined Squadron DO 22 at Stenay (Meuse), flying Dorand aircraft. From 11 August, he saw the advancing German armies left behind villages on fire. On the evening of 2 September he told General Foch, what he had seen of the march on Reims by the German Third Army under General von Hausen. His reports to General Foch continued in the following days. Qn 9 September, during the First Battle of the Marne, he reported three times that there was a gap between the German armies and Camp de Mailly. Exploitation of the gap allowed the successful offensive by the French. Brindejonc de Moulinais was mentioned in dispatches for his work

He was promoted to sergeant on 3 September 1914, to second lieutenant on 25 December 1914 and lieutenant on 26 December 1915. He was awarded the Croix de Guerre on 2 June 1915.

After the Battle of Champagne, his health became increasingly poor and he had to rest in Britain. On 28 August 1915 he became the chief pilot at the Morane-Saulnier flight school at Le Bourget. On 30 May 1916 he joined a squadron as a pilot.

== Death ==
Shortly after his return, both he and Maxime Lenoir were shot down. He was shot down on 18 August 1916 over Vadelaincourt near Verdun, and was buried in Souilly on 6 July 1922. Captain de Beauchamp, who would be killed on 10 November 1916, gave him this tribute: "Brindejonc is the man in the plume, the symbol light, living, the beauty, honor passing very high, over life."
