= Royal Aircraft Factory S.E.4a =

S.E.4a

General information
- Type: Scout aircraft
- National origin: United Kingdom
- Manufacturer: Royal Aircraft Factory
- Primary user: Royal Flying Corps
- Number built: 4

History
- First flight: 25 June 1915
- Retired: 1917
- Developed from: Royal Aircraft Factory S.E.4

The Royal Aircraft Factory S.E.4a was an experimental British single-engined scout aircraft of the First World War. Four S.E.4a aircraft were built, being used for research purposes and as home-defence fighters by the Royal Flying Corps. In spite of its type number it had little or no relationship to the earlier S.E.4

== Development and design ==
In 1915, Henry Folland of the Royal Aircraft Factory designed a new single-engined scout aircraft, the S.E.4a. While it had a similar designation to Folland's earlier Royal Aircraft Factory S.E.4 of 1914, which had been designed to be the fastest aircraft in the world, the S.E.4a was fundamentally a new aircraft, intended to investigate the relationship between stability and manoeuvrability, and for possible operational use.

The resulting design was a single-engined, single bay biplane. The fuselage structure was of mixed construction, with a steel tube forward section and a wooden box-girder rear section. The first prototype's fuselage was smoothly faired out to a circular section using formers and stringers, with the forward fuselage back to the cockpit covered in metal skinning and the rear fuselage fabric covered. The wood and fabric single-bay wings, unlike the S.E.4, had noticeable stagger between the upper and lower wings, but were fitted with similar, full span control surfaces which could be moved differentially as ailerons or together as camber changing flaps, to those used on the S.E.4.

The first prototype's engine, an 80 hp (60 kW) Gnome rotary engine, was mounted within a smooth cowling driving a two-bladed propeller fitted with a large, blunt spinner. This was found to lead to engine overheating and was replaced by a more conventional arrangement.

The remaining three prototypes had simpler structures, with flat-sided fuselages, and many of the drag reducing features of the first prototype omitted. They were powered by a range of engines of similar power to that used in the first prototype, including Clerget and Le Rhône rotaries.

== Operational history ==
The first prototype flew on 25 June 1915, with the remaining three aircraft all having flown by mid August. The S.E.4a proved easy to fly, demonstrating excellent aerobatic capabilities, but were overweight and underpowered, and was not developed further.

Two of the aircraft, armed with a Lewis gun mounted above the upper wing were issued to Home Defence squadrons of the Royal Flying Corps in the winter of 1915–16, based at Hounslow Heath Aerodrome and Joyce Green. One of these was lost in a crash on 24 September 1915, when Captain Bindon Blood stalled and crashed, dying the next day. The third prototype remained in use for trials purposes until September 1917.

== Specifications ==
Data from The British Fighter since 1912

General characteristics

- Crew: 1
- Length: 20 ft 10 in (6.35 m)
- Wingspan: 27 ft 5 1/10 in (8.359 m)
- Height: 9 ft 5 in (2.87 m)
- Powerplant: 1 × Le Rhône rotary engine, 80 hp (60 kW)

Performance

- Maximum speed: 90 mph (140 km/h, 78 kn) at sea level

Armament

- Provision for 1× .303 in Lewis gun above upper wing

== See also ==
Related development

- Royal Aircraft Factory S.E.4
