= Borel Torpille =

1910s French light aircraft

Torpille

General information
- Type: Racing aircraft
- Manufacturer: Borel
- Number built: 1

History
- First flight: 1913

The Borel Torpille (French: "Torpedo") was a French single-engine single-seat aircraft built in 1913.

== Design and development ==
The Torpille had a wire-braced monoplane wing attached to a streamlined monocoque fuselage, which inspired the airplane's appellation. Its powerplant was a 50 hp (37 kW) rotary engine.

== Operational history ==
Pierre Daucourt used the Torpille to compete in the 1913 Coupe Pommery. He flew it in the first leg of the 1913 competition, and later used it in an attempt to reach Egypt by air.

== Specifications ==
General characteristics

- Crew: one, pilot
- Length: 5.80 m (19 ft 0 in)
- Wingspan: 8.00 m (26 ft 3 in)
- Height: 2.35 m (7 ft 8 in)
- Powerplant: 1 × Gnome rotary , 37 kW (50 hp)

Performance
