= Royal Aircraft Factory S.E.4 =

S.E.4

General information
- Type: Scout aircraft
- National origin: United Kingdom
- Manufacturer: Royal Aircraft Factory
- Designer: Henry Folland
- Primary user: Royal Flying Corps
- Number built: 1

History
- First flight: June 1914
- Retired: 1914

The Royal Aircraft Factory S.E.4 was a single-engined, single seat biplane designed and built at the Royal Aircraft Factory just prior to the start of the First World War. Intended to be as fast as possible, it recorded a speed of 135 mph (217 km/h), which made it the fastest aircraft in the world in 1914, but no production followed and it was soon written off in a crash.

== Development and design ==
In April 1913, Henry Folland, one of the talented pool of designers assembled at the Royal Aircraft Factory started the design of a high-speed development of the earlier Royal Aircraft Factory S.E.2 (designed by Geoffrey de Havilland), the S.E.3. The S.E.3 was abandoned in favour of the S.E.4, a more advanced aircraft intended to break the world air speed record.

The S.E.4 was a tractor biplane powered by a closely cowled 14-cylinder, two-row Gnome rotary engine. The aircraft's fuselage was of wooden construction, and was carefully streamlined to reduce drag. Although it has been sometimes claimed to be of monocoque construction, the fuselage was in fact built around a wooden box girder, with formers fitted around the box girder to give the desired shape and skinned with plywood. The pilot sat in a cockpit under the trailing edge of the upper wing; unusually for the time, a transparent canopy made out of celluloid to fit the cockpit was made, but pilots refused to fly with it fitted and the canopy was never used. The aircraft had single-bay wings, of equal span and unstaggered. The wings were braced with a single "ɪ" section strut on each side, and were fitted with full span control surfaces on both the upper and lower wings. These could be moved differentially as ailerons or together as camber changing flaps, with the gaps between the wings and control surfaces covered in elastic netting to further reduce drag. The aircraft had a Conventional landing gear, with a tail skid, and the main wheels carried on each side of a leaf spring held on an inverted tripod.

== Operational history ==
The prospective design, although yet to fly, was mentioned at a February 1914 meeting of the Royal Aeronautical Society by Brigadier General David Henderson, who said:"If anyone wants to know which country has the fastest aeroplane in the world-it is Great Britain". The S.E.4 was first flown in June 1914, demonstrating performance every bit as good as hoped, with a maximum speed of 135 mph (217 km/h), making it the fastest aircraft in the world. The novel mounting of the mainwheels proved unstable during taxiing, and was replaced by more conventional V-struts. The engine was prone to overheating, so the propeller spinner had an opening cut into it and a fan installed inside the spinner to help cool the engine.

Although it was praised by its pilots, including John Salmond, later to become Chief of the Air Staff, its landing speed of 52 mph (84 km/h) was considered too fast for operational use, and the engine was still too unreliable, being replaced by a 100 hp (75 kW) Gnome Monosoupape rotary engine. With this engine, speed fell to a less impressive 92 mph (148 km/h).

The S.E.4 was badly damaged in a landing accident on 12 August 1914, with the type being abandoned. Although the Royal Aircraft Factory S.E.4a had a similar designation, it was effectively a completely different aircraft.

== Operators ==
United Kingdom

- Royal Flying Corps

== Specifications (160 hp Gnome) ==
Data from The British Fighter since 1912

General characteristics

- Crew: 1
- Length: 21 ft 4 in (6.50 m)
- Wingspan: 27 ft 6 in (8.38 m)
- Height: 9 ft 0 in (2.74 m) (Initial tripod undercarriage)
- Wing area: 188 sq ft (17.5 m^{2})
- Powerplant: 1 × Gnôme Double Lambda 14-cylinder rotary engine, 160 hp (120 kW)
- Propellers: 4-bladed

Performance

- Maximum speed: 135 mph (217 km/h, 117 kn)
- Endurance: 1 hr
- Rate of climb: 1,600 ft/min (8.1 m/s)

Armament

- None

== See also ==
Related development

- Royal Aircraft Factory S.E.2
- Royal Aircraft Factory S.E.4a

== Bibliography ==
- Bruce, J.M. British Aeroplanes 1914–18. London:Putnam, 1957.
- Bruce, J.M. War Planes of the First World War: Volume Two Fighters. London: Macdonald, 1968, ISBN 0-356-01473-8.
- Bruce, J.M. The Aeroplanes of the Royal Flying Corps (Military Wing). London: Putnam, 1982. ISBN 0-370-30084-X.
- Hare, Paul R. The Royal Aircraft Factory. London: Putnam, 1990. ISBN 0-85177-843-7.
- Lewis, Peter. The British Fighter since 1912. London: Putnam, Fourth edition, 1979. ISBN 0-370-10049-2.
- Mason, Francis K. The British Fighter since 1912. Annapolis, USA: Naval Institute Press, 1992. ISBN 1-55750-082-7.
