= Farman HF.19 =

1910s French aircraft

HF.19

General information
- Type: Reconnaissance seaplane
- Manufacturer: Farman Aviation Works
- Designer: Henry Farman

History
- First flight: 1913

The Henry Farman HF.19 was a French reconnaissance seaplane developed by Henry Farman before World War I. As a floatplane, it used floats for take-off and landing on water.

== Specifications ==
Data from

General characteristics

- Crew: 2
- Length: 9.87 m (32 ft 5 in)
- Wingspan: 19.70 m (64 ft 8 in)
- Height: 3.60 m (11 ft 10 in)
- Empty weight: 650 kg (1,433 lb)
- Gross weight: 1,250 kg (2,756 lb)
- Powerplant: 1 × Gnome Lambda Lambda 14-cylinder two-row air-cooled rotary piston engine, 120 kW (160 hp)

Performance

- Maximum speed: 105 km/h (65 mph, 57 kn)
