= Borel-Boccaccio Type 3000 =

1910s French fighter aircraft

Type 3000
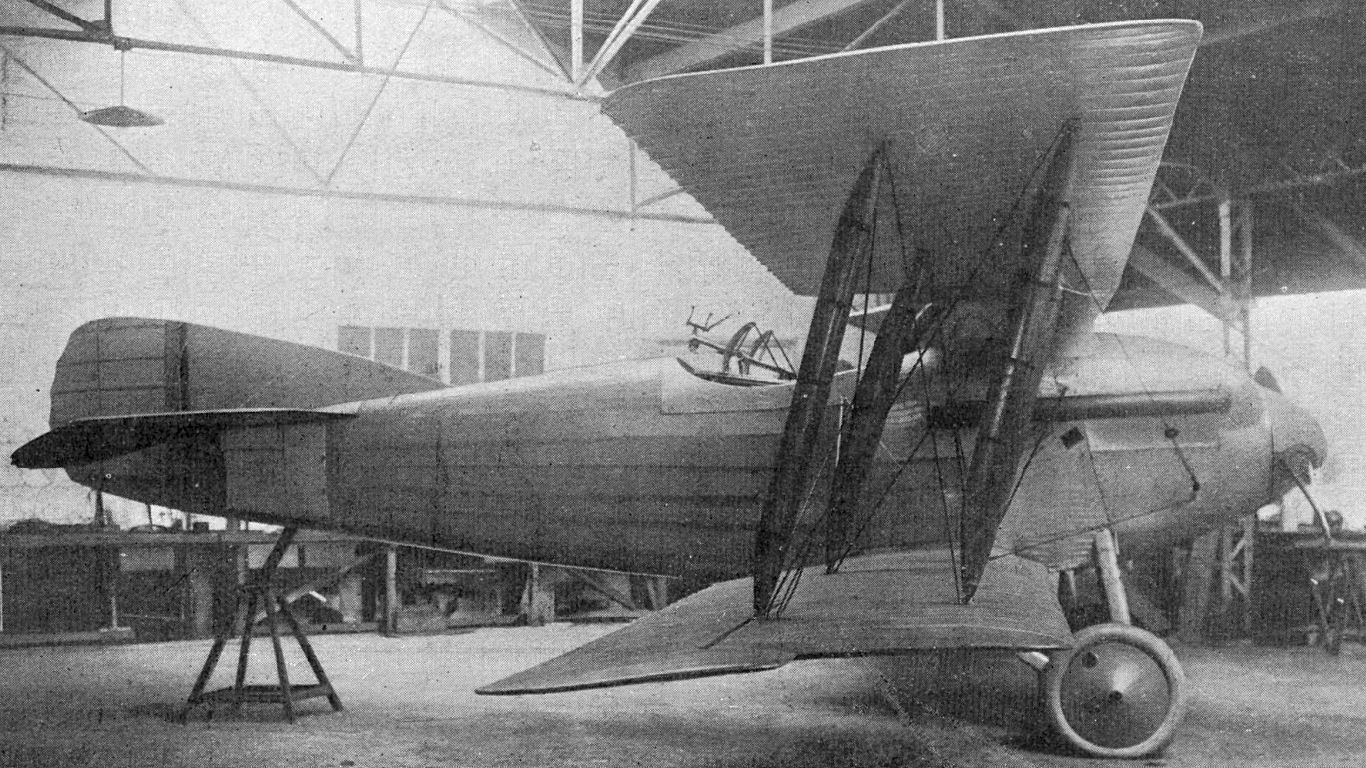

General information
- Type: 2-seat fighter
- National origin: France
- Manufacturer: Borel
- Number built: 1x C1, 1x C2

History
- First flight: 1919
- Developed from: Borel C1

The Borel-Boccaccio Type 3000, also known as Borel C2, was a two-seat fighter designed and built in France to a 1918 C2 specification.

== Design and development ==
In 1918 Borel responded to two specifications for fighter aircraft, one single seat with provision for a rear gunner and another two-seater. Two almost identical designs emerged to meet these specifications, the Borel C1 and Borel C2.

=== Borel C1 ===
The C1 was designed with two fixed synchronised machine-guns, or a single machine-gun with a 37 mm (1.457 in) cannon firing through the propeller boss. Two additional machine-guns were also proposed, fired by a second crewman seated behind the pilot, known as a single-seat protégé, which mirrored the C2 specification. Development of the sole C1 was abandoned with the armistice in favour of the almost identical C2.

=== Borel C2 / Borel-Boccaccio Type 3000 ===
The C2 was a two-seat fighter very similar to the C1 but with a gun ring in a separate cockpit behind the pilot and a revised cabane strut arrangement. The two-bay biplane wings had moderate stagger and were attached to the lower fuselage longerons and to the upper longerons with cabane struts under the centre section. Power was supplied by a 300 hp (220 kW) Hispano-Suiza 8Fb driving a 2-bladed wooden propeller with a large spinner. The wooden fuselage was covered in fabric and housed two jettisonable fuel tanks and, initially, a ventral radiator for the closely cowled Hispano-Suiza 8Fb and fixed 7.7 mm (0.303 in) Vickers machine-gun. Provision for two cameras was made under the pilots seat and the rear gunner had two 7.7 mm (0.30 in) guns on a T.O.3 gun ring.

Testing of the Type 3000 revealed that the aircraft met the armament requirements of the specification and that the structure had a load factor of seven (could withstand 7g). Modifications included replacing the ventral radiator with two Lamblin radiators mounted on the undercarriage legs, shortened exhaust manifolds and an extra strut supporting the tailplane. Despite exceeding the performance requirements the Type 3000 was not ordered for production due to the SPAD S.XX, beating Borel to the post, having been flown and tested in 1918.

== Specifications (Type 3000 / C2) ==
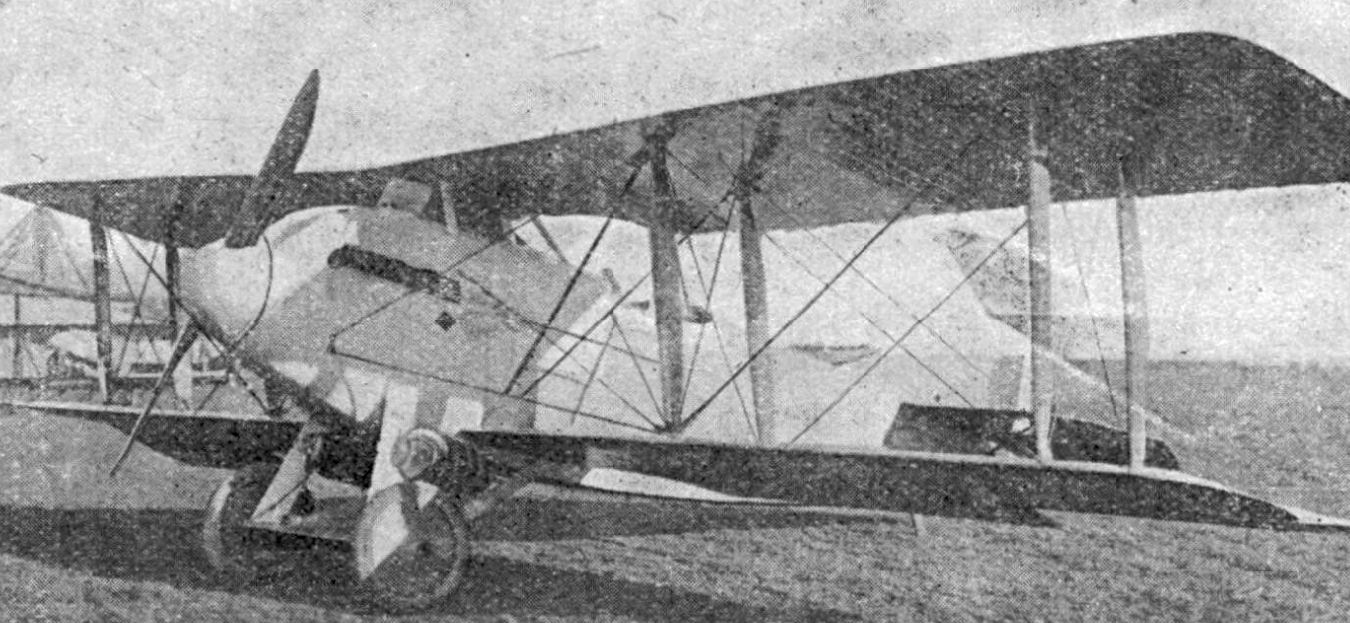
3/4 front view

Data from French aircraft of the First World War, Aviafrance:Borel C2

General characteristics

- Crew: 2
- Length: 7.095 m (23 ft 3 in)
- Wingspan: 11.4 m (37 ft 5 in)
- Height: 2.65 m (8 ft 8 in)
- Wing area: 33 m^{2} (360 sq ft)
- Empty weight: 897 kg (1,978 lb)
- Gross weight: 1,315 kg (2,899 lb)
- Powerplant: 1 × Hispano-Suiza 8Fb V-8 water-cooled piston engine, 220 kW (300 hp)
- Propellers: 2-bladed fixed-pitch propeller

Performance

- Maximum speed: 242 km/h (150 mph, 131 kn) at sealevel

260 km/h (160 mph; 140 kn) at 2,000 m (6,600 ft)
237 km/h (147 mph; 128 kn) at 3,000 m (9,800 ft)
230 km/h (140 mph; 120 kn) at 4,000 m (13,000 ft)

- Range: 500 km (310 mi, 270 nmi)
- Endurance: 3 hours
- Service ceiling: 7,500 m (24,600 ft)
- Time to altitude: 1,000 m (3,300 ft) in 2 minutes 47 seconds

2,000 m (6,600 ft) in 6 minutes 29 seconds
4,000 m (13,000 ft) in 15 minutes
6,000 m (20,000 ft) in 25 minutes 53 seconds

Armament

- Guns: 1x or 2x fixed forward firing synchronised 7.7 mm (0.303 in) Vickers machine-guns with 1x or 2x 7.7 mm (0.303 in) Lewis guns on a T.O.3 gun ring
