= Gnome Lambda =

Lambda
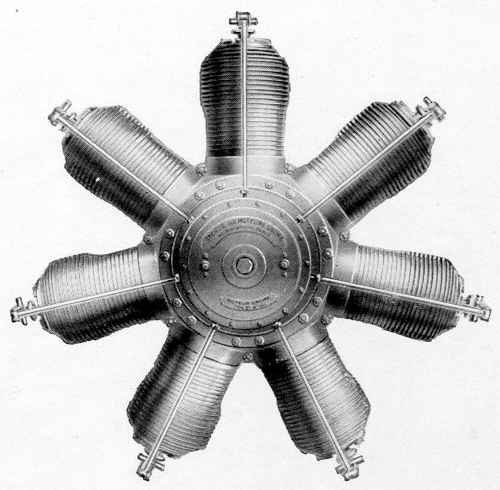
- Gnome 7 Lambda as shown in a 1913 Gnome catalog
- Type: Rotary aero engine
- Manufacturer: Gnome et Rhône
- First run: c. 1911
- Major applications: Avro 504; Bristol Boxkite; Bristol Scout
- Number built: 2,720 (French production); 979 (British production)

The Gnome 7 Lambda was a French designed, seven-cylinder, air-cooled rotary aero engine that was produced under license in Britain and Germany. Powering several World War I-era aircraft types it was claimed to produce 80 horsepower (60 kW) from its capacity of 12 litres (730 cubic inches) although recorded figures are lower.

Just under 1,000 units were produced in Britain, the majority (967) by the Daimler Company of Coventry. A 14-cylinder variant was known as the Gnome 14 Lambda-Lambda.

In Germany, Motorenfabrik Oberursel license-built the seven-cylinder engine as the Oberursel U.0 and later copied the 14-cylinder design and designated it as the Oberursel U.III.

== Variants ==
Gnome 7 Lambda
Seven-cylinder, single-row rotary engine.
Gnome 7 Lambda (long stroke)
Increased stroke of 145 mm (5.71 in) to raise the compression ratio to 3.87:1, and total displacement to 12.26 litres (748 cu in).
Gnome 14 Double Lambda
14-cylinder, two-row rotary engine using Lambda cylinders. 160 hp (120 kW).
Motorenfabrik Oberursel U.0
German production of the Gnome 7 Lambda – had a 124 mm (4.88 in) cylinder bore and 140 mm (5.51 in) piston stroke for a total displacement of 11.52 litres (703 cu in), external diameter of 1.020 metres (40.16 in).
Motorenfabrik Oberursel U.III
German production of the Gnome 14 Double Lambda

== Applications ==
List from Lumsden

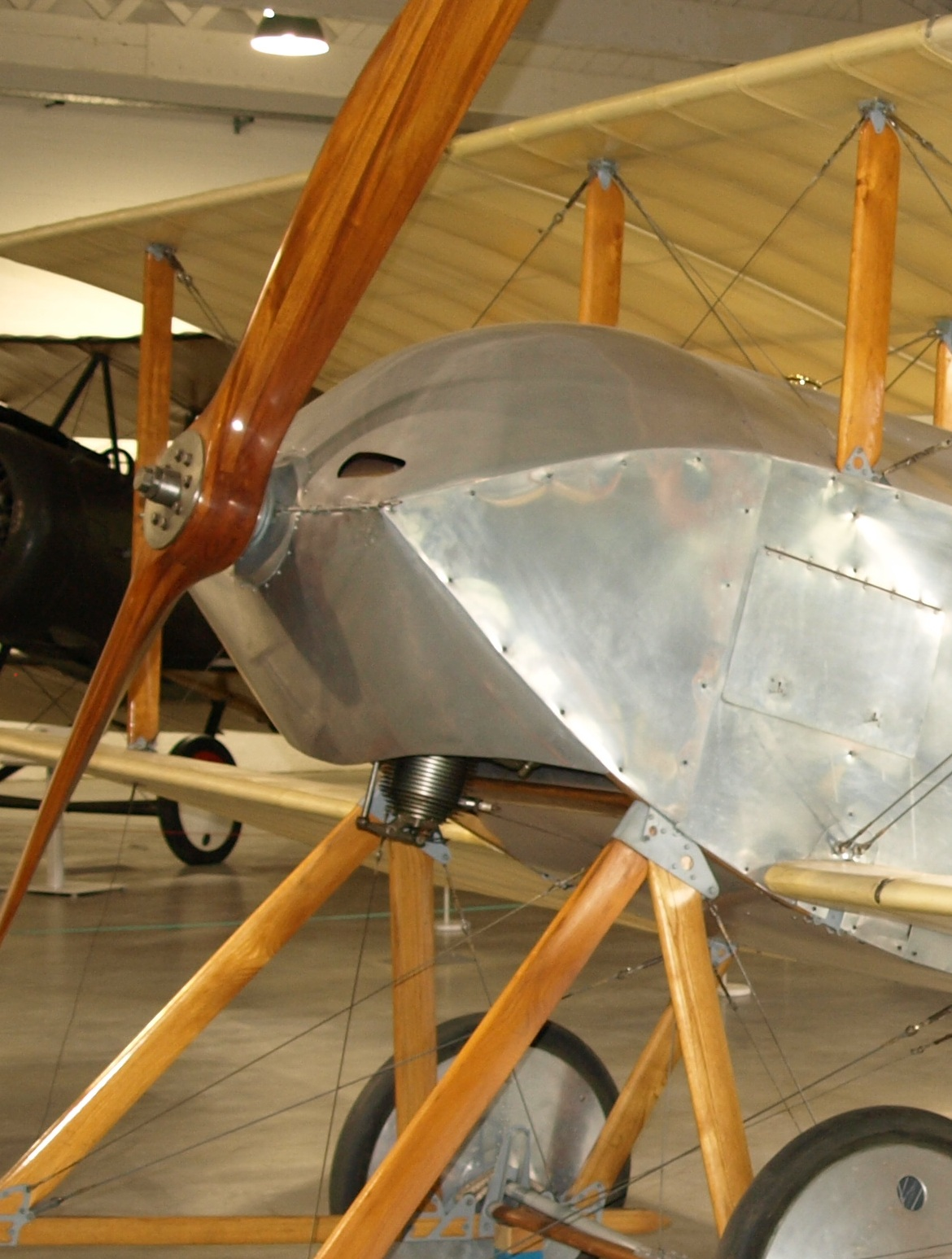
The Sopwith Tabloid replica on display at the Royal Air Force Museum is fitted with an original Gnome 7 Lambda engine.

=== Gnome 7 Lambda ===
- Avro 504
- Blackburn Type I
- Borel hydro-monoplane
- Blériot Parasol
- Blériot XI
- Bristol Boxkite
- Bristol Gordon England G.E.3
- Bristol-Coanda Monoplanes
- Bristol Coanda T.B.8
- Bristol Coanda P.B.8
- Bristol Scout
- Caudron G.III
- Deperdussin Type B
- Dunne D.8
- Farman HF.14
- Farman HF.20
- Grahame-White Type XV
- London & Provincial 4
- Lowe Marlburian
- Nieuport IVG
- Nieuport 10
- Nieuport-Macchi Parasol
- Radley-England Waterplane
- Royal Aircraft Factory B.E.3
- Royal Aircraft Factory B.E.4
- Royal Aircraft Factory B.E.8
- Royal Aircraft Factory B.S.1
- Royal Aircraft Factory S.E.2
- Royal Aircraft Factory S.E.2
- Royal Aircraft Factory S.E.4
- Short S.37
- Short S.38
- Short S.41
- Short S.60
- Short S.70
- Sikorsky S-7
- Sopwith Gordon Bennett Racer
- Sopwith Pup
- Sopwith Sociable
- Sopwith Tabloid
- Sopwith Three-Seater
- Vickers No.8 Monoplane

=== Gnome 14 Lambda-Lambda ===
- Avro 510
- Royal Aircraft Factory S.E.4
- Deperdussin Monocoque
- Farman HF.19
- Fokker D.III
- Fokker E.IV
- Paul Schmitt P.S.3
- Short S.63
- Short S.64
- Short S.70
- Short S.74
- Short S.80
- Short S.81
- Short S.82

== Surviving engines ==
An original Gnome 7 Lambda engine is installed in the Sopwith Tabloid replica aircraft on display in the Grahame-White hall of the Royal Air Force Museum London.

== Specifications (Gnome 7 Lambda) ==
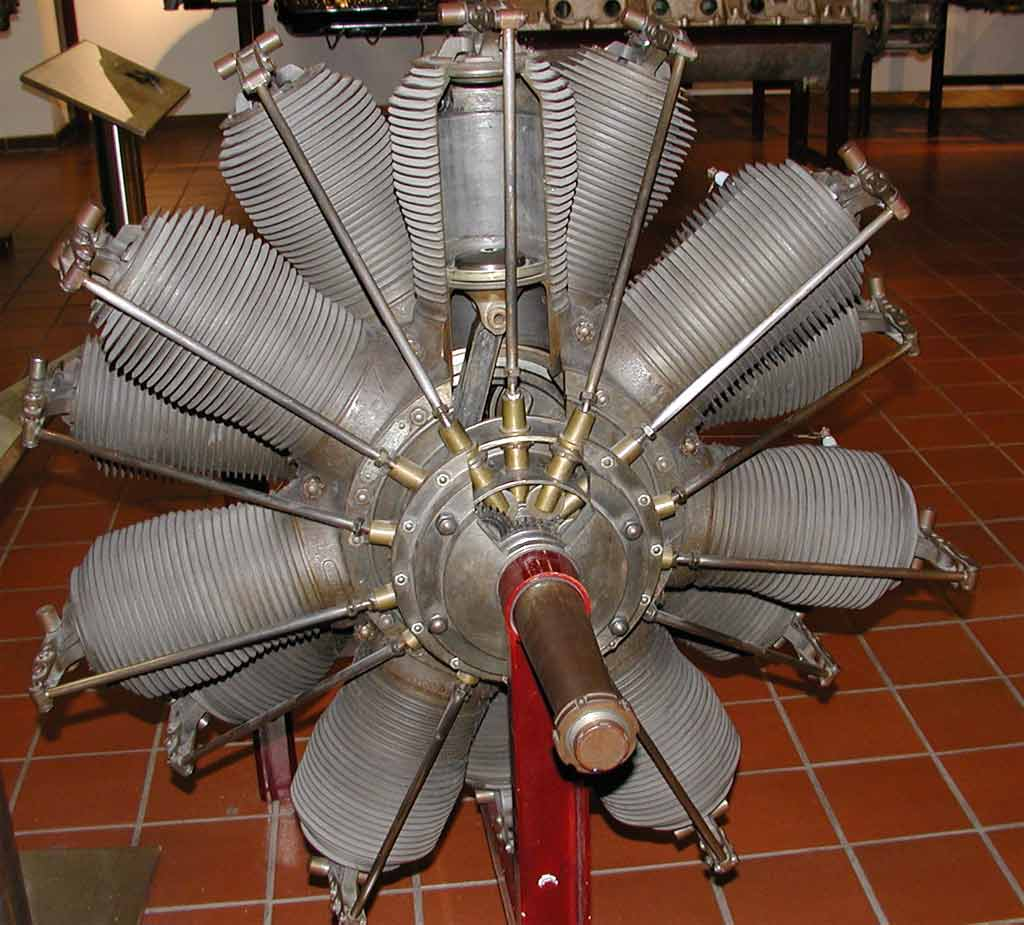
Oberursel U.III, a copy of the 14-cylinder Gnome Lambda-Lambda

Data from Lumsden.

=== General characteristics ===
- Type: 7-cylinder, single-row, rotary engine
- Bore: 124 mm (4.9 in)
- Stroke: 140 mm (5.5 in)
- Displacement: 11.8 L (720 cu in)
- Length: 112 cm (44 in)
- Diameter: 93 cm (37 in)
- Dry weight: 96 kg (212 lb)

=== Components ===
- Valvetrain: Automatic centre-piston inlet valve, overhead exhaust valve (one each per cylinder)
- Cooling system: Air-cooled
- Reduction gear: Direct drive, right-hand tractor, left-hand pusher

=== Performance ===
- Power output: 50.3 kW (67.5 hp) at 1,250 rpm (maximum power)
- Compression ratio: 3.75:1

== See also ==
Comparable engines

- Clerget
- Le Rhône

Related lists

- List of aircraft engines
