= Farman HF.14 =

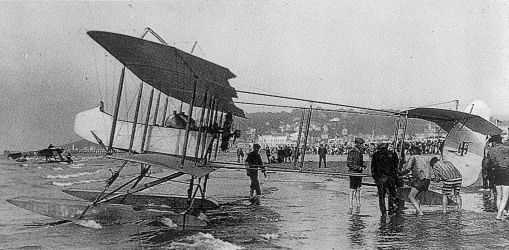
- Farman HF.14 at Deauville in 1913 configured as a floatplane

General information
- Type: Reconnaissance
- National origin: France
- Manufacturer: Farman Aviation Works
- Designer: Henri Farman

History
- Introduction date: 1912
- First flight: July 1912
- Developed from: Farman HF.6

The Farman HF.14 was a French two seat reconnaissance type produced by Farman Aviation Works before World War I.

== Design and development ==
Designed by Henry Farman and built at the Farman factory in Boulogne-Billancourt north of Paris, the HF.14 was an improved version of the HF.6. The two bay sesquiplane featured unstaggered wings with conventional interplane struts and a fuselage of wood and steel construction. The large ailerons were installed only on the upper wing and were interconnected, unlike some earlier Farman designs with single acting ailerons that hung down with the aircraft at rest. Using the same triangular empennage support structure as the HF.6, the new aircraft had a more streamlined horizontal stabilizer and an oval rudder. This set up was used by Farman in many of his later designs.

When fitted out as a floatplane the machine had one tail and two main floats. All three were of a plain non-stepped type and could move independently of each other using steel and rubber spring assemblies.

The HF.14 was powered by a 7-cylinder, air-cooled Gnome Lambda rotary piston engine of 80 hp in a pusher configuration. Part of the upper wing was cut away to provide clearance for the propeller and passengers had to be careful not to let anything get drawn into and strike the blades.

== Operational history ==
Over the course of its useful life the HF.14 was employed privately as a racing plane and later by the military as a trainer. One HF.14 was seen to have four passengers behind the pilot and in November 1913 French aviator Maurice Chevillard became the first to loop a biplane, flying a Farman HF.14.

== Specifications ==
Data from Aviafrance.com

General characteristics

- Crew: 2
- Capacity: (up to four passengers)
- Length: 8.36 m (27 ft 5 in)
- Wingspan: 13.75 m (45 ft 1 in)
- Height: 3.41 m (11 ft 2 in)
- Wing area: 32 m^{2} (340 sq ft)
- Empty weight: 175 kg (386 lb)
- Max takeoff weight: 295 kg (650 lb)
- Powerplant: 1 × Gnome Lambda 7-cylinder, air-cooled rotary piston engine, 60 kW (80 hp)

Performance

- Maximum speed: 65 km/h (40 mph, 35 kn)
- Endurance: 3 hours

== Bibliography ==
- Liron, Jean (1984). Les avions Farman. Collection Docavia. Vol. 21. Paris: Éditions Larivière. OCLC 37146471.
