= Bristol T.B.8 =

British training biplane

T.B.8
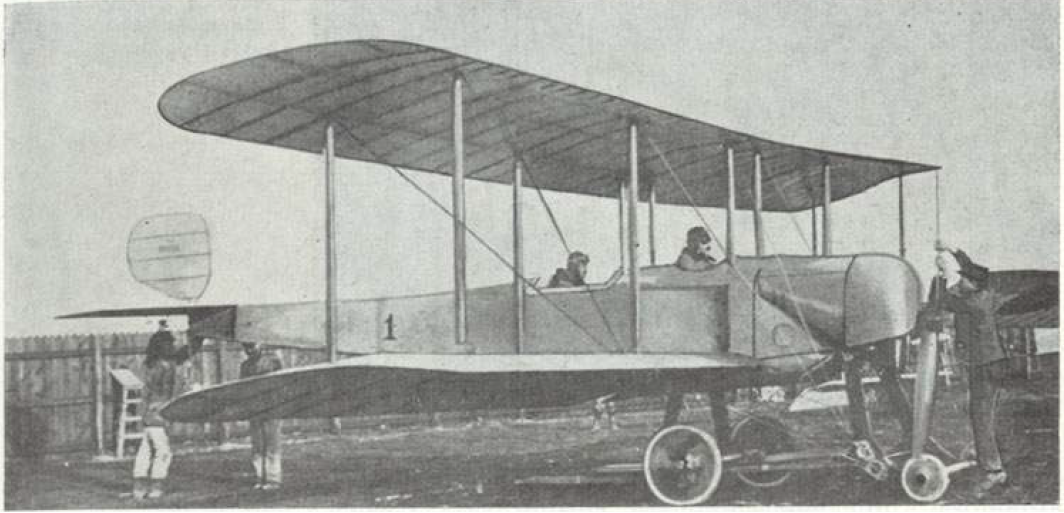
- A Bristol T.B.8 at Cotroceni

General information
- Type: Trainer/Bomber
- Manufacturer: Bristol Aeroplane Company
- Designer: Henri Coandă
- Primary users: Royal Naval Air Service Royal Flying Corps; Romanian Air Force
- Number built: 54

History
- Introduction date: 1913
- First flight: 12 August 1913
- Retired: 1916
- Developed from: Bristol-Coanda Monoplanes

The Bristol T.B.8, or Bristol-Coanda T.B.8 was an early British biplane built by the Bristol Aeroplane Company and designed by the Romanian Henri Coandă. Fifty four Bristol T.B.8s were built, being mainly used as a trainer. A small number of Bristol T.B.8s were briefly used as bombers at the start of the World War I by the Royal Naval Air Service.

== Design and development ==
Romanian Henri Coandă, chief designer of the Bristol Aeroplane Company, developed the Bristol T.B.8 as a biplane conversion of his previously designed Bristol-Coanda Monoplane. The conversion was made to meet an order from the British Admiralty, with the Bristol T.B.8 first flying on 12 August 1913. This aircraft was tested with both wheeled undercarriage and floats.

The Bristol T.B.8 was a single-engined, two-seat biplane, with two-bay wings and a slender fuselage. It was powered by a variety of rotary engines, including the Gnome and Le Rhône engines with power ranging from 50 hp Gnomes to 100 hp Gnome Monosoupape. Early Bristol T.B.8s used wing warping, with later production aircraft being fitted with ailerons. Bristol T.B.8s were normally equipped with a distinctive four wheel undercarriage. The Bristol T.B.8 was produced by both the conversion of existing Coanda-Bristol Monoplanes and the manufacturing of new aircraft.

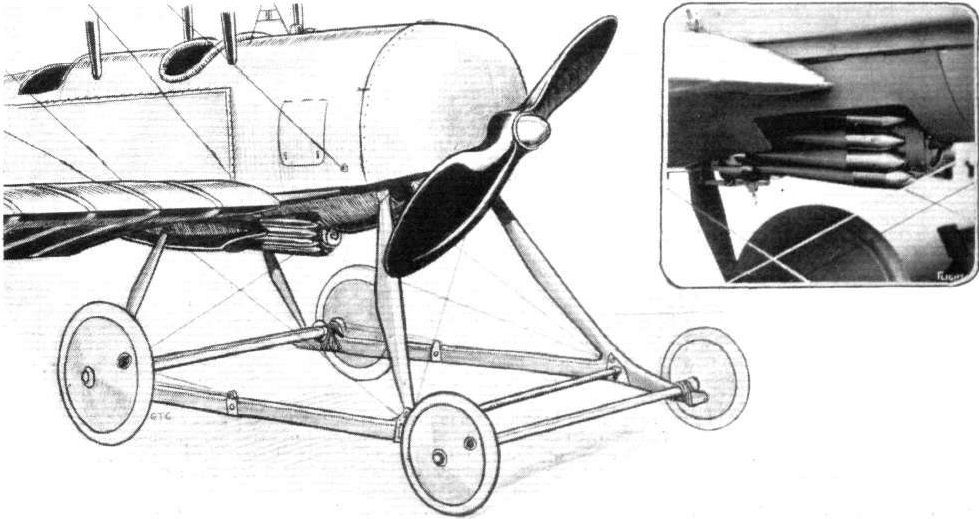
The Bristol T.B.8 fitted with the cylindrical bomb carrier

One Bristol T.B.8 was fitted with a prismatic Bombsight in the front cockpit and a cylindrical bomb carrier in the lower forward fuselage, capable of carrying twelve 10 lb (4.5 kg) bombs, which could be dropped singly or as a salvo as required. This aircraft was displayed at the Paris Salon de l'Aéronautique and evaluated by the French military before being purchased by the Royal Navy Air Service.

== Operational history ==
Bristol T.B.8s were purchased for use both by the Royal Naval Air Service and the Royal Flying Corps, with the Royal Flying Corp's Bristol T.B.8s being transferred to the Royal Navy Air Service shortly after the start of World War I. Three Bristol T.B.8s, including the aircraft displayed at the Paris Air Show in December 1913, were sent to France following the outbreak of World War I, serving with a Royal Navy Air Service squadron commanded by Charles Rumney Samson. One of these Bristol T.B.8s executed a bombing attack on German gun batteries at Middelkerke Belgium on 25 November 1914, with the attack being the only bombing sortie flown by the Bristol T.B.8. The Bristol T.B.8 was considered too slow for frontline operations, and was relegated to training operations, serving until 1916.

== Variants ==
G.B.75
The Romanian government was pleased with the Bristol T.B.8 and placed an order for an improved version, for which they provided a 75 hp (56 kW) Gnome Monosoupape engine. The resulting aircraft, designated the G.B.75 was significantly different in appearance, with a streamlined front fuselage and rounded cowling, enclosing the rotary engine. The characteristic Coanda fin was replaced with an unbalanced rudder plus fin. Maximum speed was increased to 80 mph (130 km/h). It first flew on 7 April 1914 and required the removal of the spinner and an increase in stagger to adjust the centre of pressure. Despite the alterations the Bristol G.B.75 was declared ready for service in June of 1914. The altered Bristol G.B.75s were requisitioned by the Royal Flying Corps at Farnborough, never being delivered to Romania, and being powered by a standard Gnome engine.

T.B.8H
One Bristol Coanda Monoplane was converted into the T.B.8 prototype and was fitted with twin floats as the T.B.8H "Hydro" variant.

== Operators ==
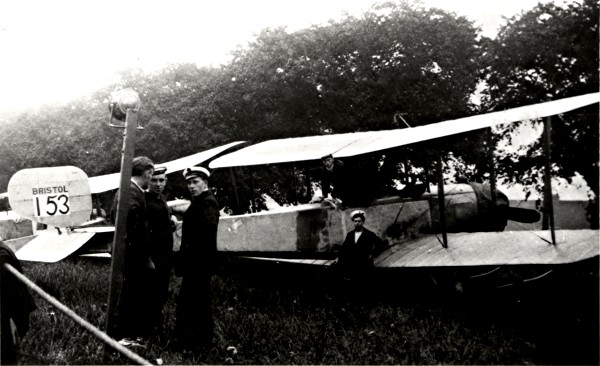
Bristol T.B.8 c. 1914

Romania

- Romanian Air Corps - 10 aircraft

United Kingdom

- Royal Flying Corps
- Royal Naval Air Service

== Specifications (T.B.8) ==
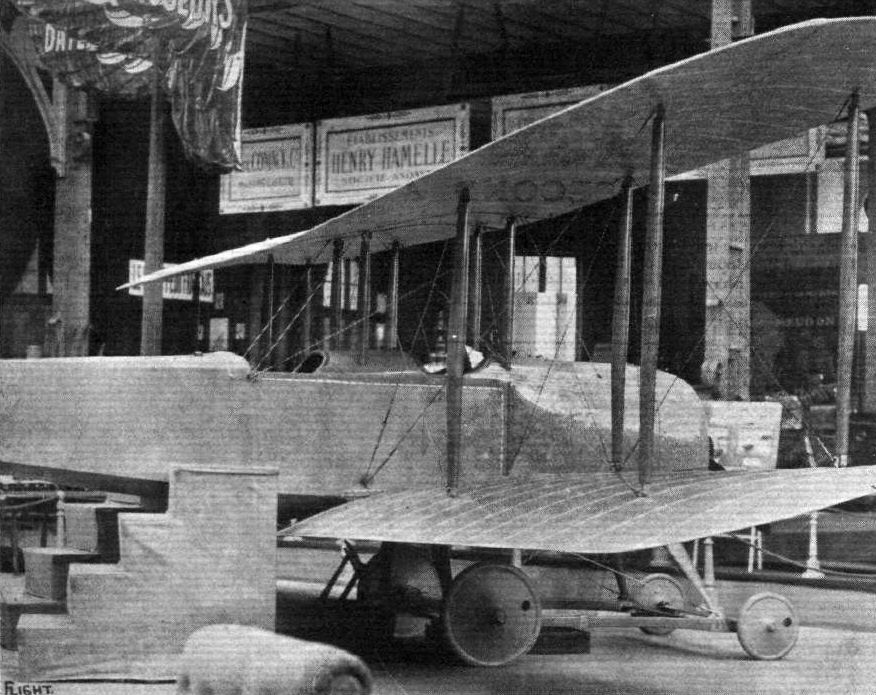
The Bristol T.B.8 at the Paris Air Show, 1913

Data from Bristol Aircraft Since 1910

General characteristics

- Crew: 2
- Length: 29 ft 3 in (8.92 m)
- Wingspan: 37 ft 8 in (11.48 m)
- Wing area: 450 sq ft (42 m^{2})
- Empty weight: 970 lb (440 kg)
- Gross weight: 1,665 lb (755 kg)
- Powerplant: × Gnome Lambda 7-cylinder air-cooled rotary piston engine, 80 hp (60 kW)
- Propellers: 2-bladed fixed-pitch propeller

Performance

- Maximum speed: 65–70 mph (105–113 km/h, 56–61 kn)
- Endurance: 5 hours
- Time to altitude: 3,000 ft (914 m) in 11 minutes

Armament

- Guns: Some were equipped with a 7.92 machine gun
- Bombs: 12 x 10 lb (4.5 kg) light bombs
