= Raymond Saulnier (aircraft manufacturer) =

French aeronautical engineer (1881–1964)

Raymond Victor Gabriel Jules Saulnier (Paris 27 September 1881 – Chécy 4 March 1964) was a French aeronautical engineer. He was a graduate of the École Centrale Paris, and first collaborated with Louis Blériot on the Blériot XI used for the Channel crossing. In 1911, he founded the Morane-Saulnier company with the Morane brothers, where he designed many aircraft and for which he filed numerous patents. He also designed the aircraft in which Roland Garros made the first crossing of the Mediterranean on 23 September 1913.

He was chief editor of an aviation periodical, and wrote «Etude, centrage(sic) et classification des Aéroplanes», which was considered an authoritative work on aircraft.

He personally managed Morane-Saulnier until 1961. In 1962, the company filed for bankruptcy before being integrated firstly into Sud-Aviation, of which it became a subsidiary, then into SOCATA (Société de Construction d'Avions de Tourisme et Affaires).

He had the first idea of a device allowing the synchronization of the firing a machine gun through a propeller, before the developments and refinements of Fokker, to which this device is often attributed.

He designed the Morane 406, a fast fighter aircraft of the late 1930s, the MS-760 "Paris III" and the "Rallye Commodore". Between 1945 and 1964, under his direction, Morane-Saulnier produced over 1,000 aircraft and some 30 prototypes. ('Over 80 different aircraft models emerged from the Morane-Saulnier plants', according to one source).

== Sources ==
Jean Riverain: Dictionnaire des aéronautes célèbres, Paris, Éditions Larousse, 1970

The Catalogue général de la librairie française contains the entry:

SAULNIER (Raymond), ingénieur des arts et manufactures, constructeur des monoplans Morane.

- Aéroplanes Morane-Saulnier. In-8°, 60 p. avec fig. 1913. 200, boulevard Pereire.
- Équilibre, Centrage et Classification des aéroplanes. Gr. in-8", 58 p. avec 57 fig. 1910. Librairie aéronautique. 3 fr.
  — librairie française, Catalogue général
