= Morane-Borel monoplane =

French racing aircraft

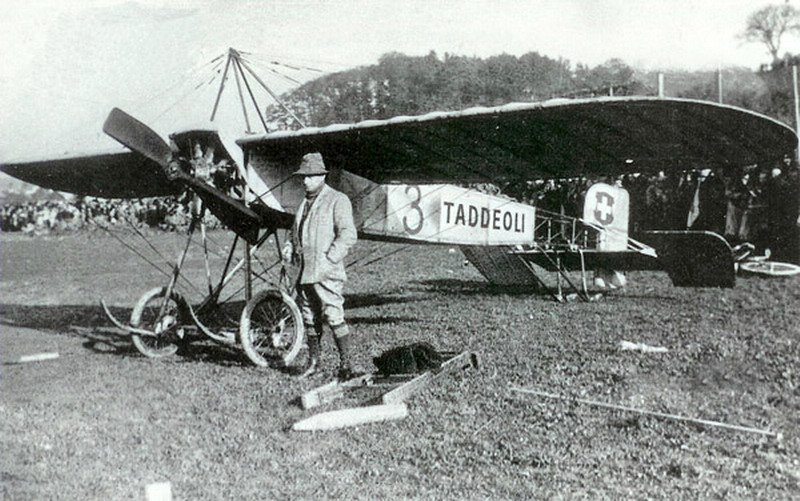
- Emile Taddéoli in ~1911/13

General information
- Type: Sports plane
- Manufacturer: Morane brothers and Gabriel Borel
- Designer: Raymond Saulnier

History
- First flight: 1911

The Morane-Borel monoplane (sometimes referred to with the retronym Morane-Saulnier Type A or simply the Morane monoplane; company designation Bo.1) was an early French single-engine, single-seat aircraft. It was flown in several European air races.

== Design ==
The Monoplane was a mid-wing tractor configuration monoplane powered by a 50 hp Gnome Omega seven-cylinder rotary engine driving a two-bladed Chauvière Intégrale propeller. The fuselage was a rectangular-section wire-braced box girder, with the forward part covered in plywood and the rear part fabric covered: the rear section was left uncovered in some examples. The two-spar wings had elliptical ends and were braced by a pyramidal cabane in front of the pilot and an inverted V-strut underneath the fuselage, behind the undercarriage. Lateral control was effected by wing warping and the empennage consisted of a fixed horizontal stabiliser with tip-mounted full-chord elevators at either end and an aerodynamically balanced rudder, with no fixed vertical surface. In later examples the horizontal surfaces were modified, and consisted of a fixed surface with balanced elevators hinged to the trailing edge. The undercarriage consisted of a pair of short skids, each carried on a pair of struts, and a pair of wheels on a cross-axle bound to the skids by bungee cords, and a tailskid.

A two-seat version was later produced, with the fuselage lengthened to 7.0 m (23 ft) and wingspan increased to 10 m (34 ft).

== Operational history ==
The Monoplane achieved fame when Jules Védrines flew one to victory in the 1911 Paris to Madrid air race, the only competitor to finish the four-day course. Later in the year he came second in the Circuit of Britain, flying an aircraft powered by a 70 hp Gnome. Another was flown by André Frey in the Paris-Rome race in 1911, finishing third. Emile Taddéoli was another owner of a Morane monoplane.

A two-seat version, powered by an 80 hp Gnome was entered for the 1912 British Military Aeroplane Competition.

== Surviving examples ==
As of 2026 a single example remained extant, after extensive conservation work was done at the Canada Aviation Museum.

== Operators ==
Argentina

- Argentine Air Force

Brazil

- Brazilian Naval Aviation

Romania

- Romanian Air Corps

United Kingdom

- Royal Navy
  - Royal Naval Air Service

== Specifications ==
From: l'Aérophile, 15 April 1911, p. 170

General characteristics

- Crew: one
- Length: 6.50 m (21 ft 6 in)
- Wingspan: 9.50 m (31 ft 1 in)
- Wing area: 14 m^{2} (151 sq ft)
- Empty weight: 200 kg (441 lb)
- Gross weight: 430 kg (948 lb)
- Powerplant: 1 × Gnome Omega 7-cylinder air-cooled rotary piston engine , 37 kW (50 hp)

Performance

- Maximum speed: 111 km/h (69 mph, 60 kn)
