= Robert and Léon Morane =

French aviation pioneers

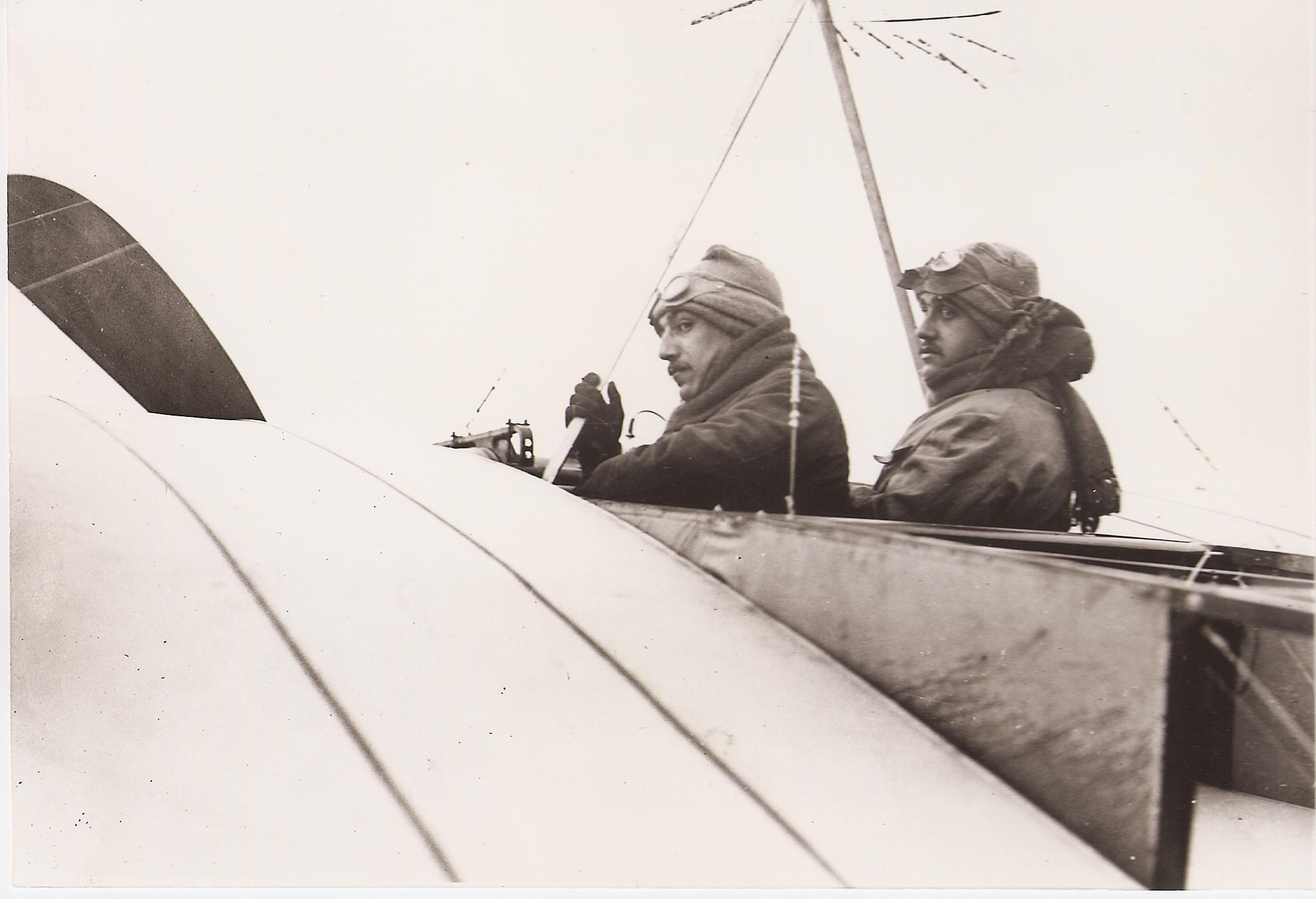
Robert(left) and Léon Morane, at the Prix Michelin d'aviation in 1910

Robert Morane, (10 March 1886, Paris – 28 August 1968, Paris) and his brother Léon Morane (11 April 1885, Paris – 19 October 1918, Paris) were French aviation pioneers.

== Career ==
Léon obtained his brevet (flying licence) on 19 April 1910 in a Blériot, and that June, he took part in la Grande Semaine d'aviation de Rouen.

On 5 October 1910, Léon and Robert Morane made a trial flight, aiming to win le prix Michelin d'aviation, which required a journey between Paris and sommet du Puy de Dôme in less than 6 hours. Their attempt failed when, having set off from Issy in a Gnôme 100 hp- powered Blériot, they crashed near Boissy-Saint-Léger, both being seriously injured. After this accident, Leon received a visit from his childhood friend Raymond Saulnier, and a year later, on 10 October 1911, they created the Société Anonyme des Aéroplanes Morane – Saulnier, with Robert Morane as test pilot. Its registered office was at Paris and the factories were at Puteaux.

In 1910, Léon was the first person to fly at 100 km/h (62 mph); he also set the altitude record, at 2,500 m (8,200 ft).

Léon died during the epidemic of 'Spanish' flu in October 1918.

After the First World War the factory was dedicated primarily to production of trainers and fighter aircraft, including, notably: a single seater with canopy (1924), the MS 230 trainer which sold 1100 examples (1930), and the M.S.405/MS 406, a single seat fighter of all-metal construction, powered by a Hispano-Suiza 860 hp engine (1936–1937).

Robert founded the Morane-Saulnier flight school, where the pilots Maurice Tabuteau and Marcel Brindejonc des Moulinais trained.

The brothers are buried at the Père Lachaise Cemetery.
