= List of aircraft of the Royal Flying Corps =

This is a list of aircraft used by the Royal Flying Corps (RFC) from 13 April 1912, when it was formed from the Air Battalion Royal Engineers, until 1 April 1918 when it was merged with the Royal Naval Air Service (RNAS) to form the Royal Air Force (RAF). The RFC operated in parallel with the RNAS, whose aircraft are listed at List of aircraft of the Royal Naval Air Service. For a list of Royal Air Force aircraft see List of aircraft of the Royal Air Force.

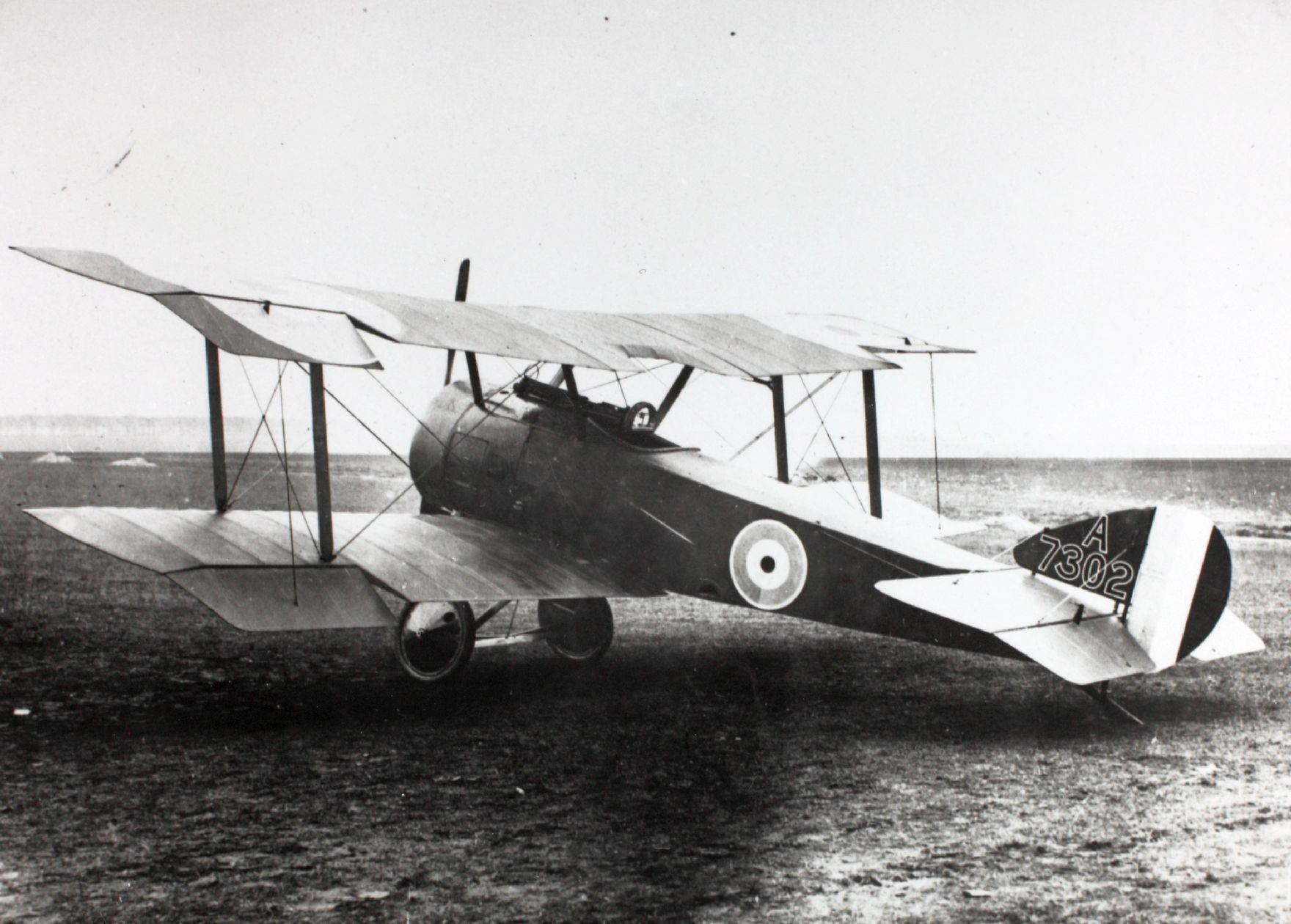
British Royal Flying Corps Sopwith Pup

== Operational aeroplanes ==
Operational aeroplanes
Aircraft	Role	First flight	Introduced to RFC service
Airco DH.1	Fighter / General purpose	January 1915	1915
Airco DH.2	Fighter	July 1915	1915
Airco DH.4	Light bomber / General purpose	August 1916	January 1917
Airco DH.5	Fighter	August 1916	May 1917
Airco DH.6	Trainer	1916	1917
Airco DH.9	Bomber	July 1917	November 1917
Airco DH.9A	Light bomber/General purpose	March 1918	Introduced to the RAF in 1918
Armstrong Whitworth F.K.2	General purpose	1915	1915
Armstrong Whitworth F.K.3	General purpose / Trainer	1915	1916
Armstrong Whitworth F.K.8	Bomber / Reconnaissance	May 1916	June 1916
Avro Type E/Es/500	General purpose	3 March 1912	1912
Avro 504	Trainer / Fighter	18 September 1913	1913
Blériot XI	Trainer / Reconnaissance	23 January 1909	1912
Blériot XII	Sport	21 May 1909	Operated by the Balloon School, not the RFC
Blériot XXI	Reconnaissance	February 1911	1911
Blériot Parasol Monoplane	Observation / Trainer / Light bomber	23 January 1909	1912
Breguet Type III	Experimental	1910	?
Bristol Boxkite	Trainer	30 July 1910	1911 (for the Air Battalion)
Bristol-Coanda Monoplane	Trainer	1912	?
Bristol F.2A and F.2B Fighter	Fighter / Reconnaissance	9 September 1916	Late 1916
Bristol Scout	Reconnaissance / Fighter	23 February 1914	1914
Bristol M.1	Fighter	14 July 1916	1917
Caudron G.III	Reconnaissance	Late 1913	?
Curtiss JN-3	Trainer	?	March 1915
Curtiss JN-4A	Trainer	1915	1917
Curtiss JN-4 (Canadian) (Note: Operated by the RFC Canada.)	Trainer	?	1917
Deperdussin TT	General purpose	1912	?
Farman HF.20	Reconnaissance	1913	?
Farman HF.27	Reconnaissance	?	?
Farman MF.7 Longhorn	Reconnaissance	1913	?
Farman MF.11 Shorthorn	Reconnaissance / Bomber	1913	?
FBA Type B	Reconnaissance (flying boat)	?	?
Grahame-White Type XV	Trainer	1913	?
Martinsyde S.1	Fighter	1914	?
Martinsyde G.100 & 102	Fighter-bomber	1915	mid-1916
Morane-Saulnier G	Reconnaissance	1912	?
Morane-Saulnier H	Reconnaissance	1913	?
Morane-Saulnier BB	Observation	1915	?
Morane-Saulnier I	Fighter	March 1916	?
Morane-Saulnier L	Reconnaissance	August 1913	?
Morane-Saulnier LA	Reconnaissance	?	?
Morane-Saulnier N	Fighter	22 July 1914	?
Morane-Saulnier V	Fighter	April 1916	?
Morane-Saulnier P	Reconnaissance	1914	?
Nieuport II.N	Sport	1910	?
Nieuport IV.G	Reconnaissance	1911	1911 (for the Air Battalion)
Nieuport 12	Reconnaissance / Fighter / Trainer	1915	?
Nieuport 16	Fighter	1916	?
Nieuport 17 & 23		January 1916	?
Nieuport 20		1915	?
Nieuport 23bis		?	?
Nieuport 24 & 24bis		1917	?
Nieuport 27		1917	?
Royal Aircraft Factory B.E.1		4 December 1911	?
Royal Aircraft Factory B.E.2		1 February 1912	?
Royal Aircraft Factory B.E.3 & 4		3 May 1912	1912
Royal Aircraft Factory B.E.7		?	?
Royal Aircraft Factory B.E.8 & 8a		1913	1914
Royal Aircraft Factory B.E.12		28 July 1915	1 August 1916
Royal Aircraft Factory F.E.2		February 1914	September 1915
Royal Aircraft Factory F.E.8		September 1915	2 August 1916
Royal Aircraft Factory R.E.1	Reconnaissance	July 1913	?
Royal Aircraft Factory R.E.5	Reconnaissance / artillery observation	1914	1914
Royal Aircraft Factory R.E.7	Light bomber and reconnaissance	1915	1915
Royal Aircraft Factory R.E.8		?	?
Royal Aircraft Factory S.E.2		?	?
Royal Aircraft Factory S.E.4a		?	?
Royal Aircraft Factory S.E.5 & 5a		?	?
Short School Biplane (S.43 & 44)		?	?
Short S.62		?	?
Short Type 184		?	?
Short Type 827		?	?
Short Bomber		?	?
Sopwith 1-1/2 Strutter		?	?
Sopwith 3-Seater		?	?
Sopwith 80 hp Biplane		?	?
Sopwith Camel		December 1916	June 1917
Sopwith Dolphin		May 1917	February 1918
Sopwith Pup		February 1916	October 1916
Sopwith Salamander		April 1918	November 1918
Sopwith Snipe		October 1917	August 1918
Sopwith Tabloid		?	?
SPAD S.VII		?	?
SPAD S.XIII		?	?
Vickers Boxkite (Vickers-Farman)		?	?
Vickers E.S.1		?	?
Vickers F.B. 'Gun Carrier'/'Fighting Biplanes'		?	?
Vickers F.B.5	Fighter	17 July 1914	November 1914
Vickers F.B.9		?	?
Vickers F.B.12		?	?
Vickers F.B.14		?	?
Vickers F.B.19		?	?
Voisin III & V		?	?

== Airships ==
The airship service was disbanded 1 January 1914 and all airships transferred to the RNAS. See List of British airships

- British Army Airship No.3/Baby/Beta/Beta II
- No.2A – 1910–
- Delta – 1912–1914
- Epsilon I and Epsilon II –
- Eta 1913–1914
- Clément-Bayard II Zeta 1910–1910
- Lebaudy Morning Post 1910–1911

== Kites ==
- Man-lifting kite

== Prototypes ==
- ASL Valkyrie (Note: No serial assigned, donated aircraft probably not flown by the RFC.)
- Airco DH.3
- Armstrong Whitworth F.K.7
- Armstrong Whitworth F.K.9
- Armstrong Whitworth F.K.10
- Avro 521
- Beatty-Wright Biplanes
- Bristol-Prier Monoplane
- Bristol TB.8 & G.B.75
- Bristol S.2A
- Caproni Ca.1 (Note: Abandoned en route during delivery flight, no serial assigned.)
- Caudron Type C/45 hp
- Caudron G.IV
- Caudron R.XI
- Cody V biplane
- Curtiss C-1 Canada
- Dunne D.8
- Farman Type Militaire, 1910
- Flanders F.4
- Grahame-White Type VII & VIIc
- Grahame-White Type VIII
- Grahame-White Pusher Biplane
- Grahame-White School Biplane
- Handley Page Type O/400 (Note: Ordered by the RFC but delivered to the Royal Air Force.)
- Howard Wright biplane
- Martin-Handasyde Monoplane
- Martinsyde F.3
- Morane-Saulnier AC
- Paulhan biplane
- Royal Aircraft Factory B.E.9
- Royal Aircraft Factory F.E.4
- Royal Aircraft Factory F.E.9
- Royal Aircraft Factory N.E.1
- Short Tractor Biplane
- Sopwith Sparrow
- Sopwith Triplane
- SPAD S.XII
- Vickers F.B.7/7A
- Vickers F.B.27 Vimy
- Vickers F.B.26 Vampire
- Wright Model H (Note: No serial assigned, previous model B out of service before 1912.)

== Unmanned aerial vehicles ==
- British unmanned aerial vehicles of World War I

== List of weapons of the Royal Flying Corps ==
=== Bombs ===
- Cooper bombs
- Ranken darts

=== Rockets ===
- Le Prieur rocket - Incendiary air-to-air rockets

=== Machine guns ===
- 0.303-inch (7.7-mm) Lewis gun
- 0.303-inch (7.7-mm) Vickers machine gun
