= Grigoriy Suk =

Russian flying ace

Grigoriy Suk, alias Grigory Suk
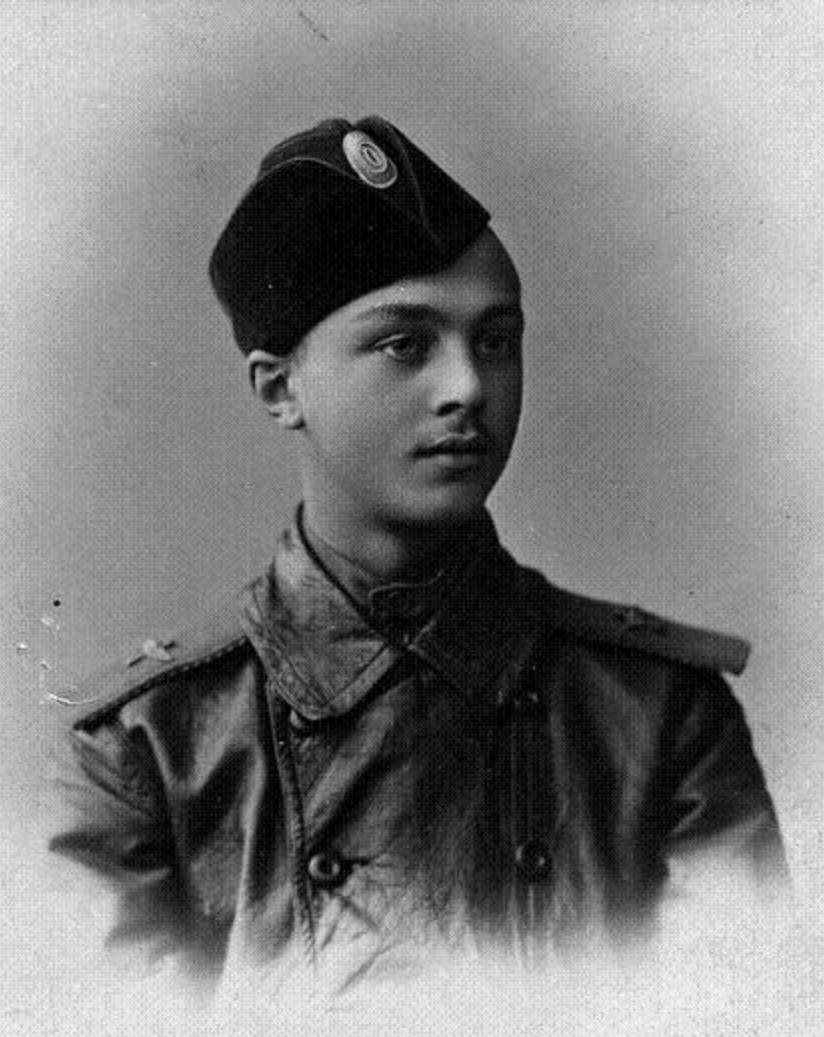
- Suk c. 1915
- Born: 12 December 1896; Rassudovo, Moscow Governorate
- Died: 28 November 1917 (aged 20); Near Radautz, Bukovina
- Relatives: Vyacheslav Suk
- Military career
- Allegiance: Russian Empire
- Branch: Imperial Russian Air Force
- Rank: Praporshik
- Units: 26th Corps Aviation Detachment; 9th Fighter Aviation Detachment
- Awards: Order of Saint George Fourth Class, Cross of Saint George, First, Second, Third, and Fourth Classes; Romanian Order of the Crown

Grigoriy Suk (Russian: Григорий Эдуардович Сук), also known as Grigory Suk in English, was a Russian flying ace for the Imperial Russian Air Service during World War I. He held the rank of praporshik.

== Early life and service ==
Born the Rassudovo Estate near Moscow on 12 December 1896, Grigoriy Suk was of Czech and Russian heritage. His Russian mother, Ljubov Osipovna Sorokina, was the daughter of a well-known physician, as well as an alumnus of the Women's College of Mariinskoe. His Czech father, scientist Eduard Ivanovich Suk, was notable enough to be a hereditary honorary citizen of Moscow. His siblings were brothers Boris and Alexei. His uncle, Vyacheslav Suk, conducted the orchestra at the Bolshoi Theatre in Moscow. Grigoriy Suk was raised in the Russian Orthodox faith.

Young Suk was educated at the Moscow Classical School, and passed on to the Moscow Imperial Practical Academy to study architecture.

The outbreak of World War I changed Suk's direction, as he enlisted in the Cuirassiers on 5 August 1914. He subsequently requested a transfer to aviation service, and was forwarded to the Gatchina Flying School on 5 June 1915. In July 1915 he began his aviation training with a class on aircraft engines.

== World War I ==
Grigoriy Suk made his first training flights in August 1915. After training, he qualified as a military pilot on 25 January 1916. On 27 January, Eduard Ivanovich Suk died abruptly; his son was granted a short leave to attend the funeral.

Suk was posted to the 26th Corps Aviation Detachment of the Imperial Russian Air Force on 11 March 1916 to fly Voisin Ls or Voisin LAs, although he did not arrive at the front until 28 March 1916. Despite being assigned to reconnaissance duties, he clashed with the enemy in the air. As his award commendation for the Cross of Saint George Third Class stated, he drove down an enemy aircraft with machine gun fire from 50 meters distance on 1 June 1916 for his first victory. His Fourth Class award of the Cross also mentioned combat with an Albatros. In fact, Suk won all four classes of the Cross while with the 26th Corps Aviation Detachment. He was also promoted to Starshy Unter-Officer (Senior Unter-officer).

His diligence caused him to be sent for fighter training in Moscow on 4 July 1916. Upon graduation, he was posted to the Kingdom of Romania to join the 9th Fighter Aviation Detachment. He flew 19 combat sorties there during September and October 1916. He began reconnaissance patrols with Nieuport 10 serial number N714, and moved up to flying Nieuport 11 s/n N1109. On 27 October 1916, Imperial Order 1676 appointed Suk to the rank of Praporschik.

On 3 February 1917, Suk and Vladimir Strzhizhevsky staked a combat claim that went unconfirmed. On the 9th, a jamming gun aborted his attack on an enemy plane. On 12 February 1917, the engine of Suk's Nieuport failed at the end of a prolonged reconnaissance flight. His subsequent inept deadstick landing at Bakey Airfield overturned and damaged the machine. Suk was then assigned Morane-Saulnier I s/n MS742. As the weather cleared in the Spring of 1917, the tempo of combat accelerated. Suk scored his second victory on 26 March 1917; his third on 17 April 1917. He then entered a dry spell marked by unfruitful attacks that did blunt enemy reconnaissance efforts. He resumed his victories in early September, and he would string them out until 10 November.

On 28 November 1917, he was killed in a landing accident as he returned from a flight. As he turned to land, his machine spun in, and he died upon impact. Three days later, Suk's award of the Order of Saint George Fourth Class arrived.

== List of aerial victories ==
Although aviation historians cite Suk as credited with either eight or nine aerial victories, they posit slightly differing lists. The below is a compilation from available sources. Confirmed victories are numbered; unconfirmed victories are denoted "u/c".

See also Aerial victory standards of World War I, List of World War I flying aces from the Russian Empire

No.	Date/time	Aircraft	Foe	Result	Location	Notes
1	1 June 1916	Voisin serial number V979	Albatros	Glided to deadstick landing behind own lines	Shchukino, modern Southwestern Ukraine	Bode was his observer
u/c	3 February 1917	Nieuport 11 s/n 1109	Enemy two-seater	Crashlanded	Ousy River Valley, present day Romania	
2	26 March 1917	Morane-Saulnier I s/n MS742	Hansa-Brandenburg C.I s/n 67.24	Driven down out of sight	Kezdy-Vozargal	Victim from Austro-Hungarian Fliegerkompanie 40
3	17 April 1917	Morane-Saulnier I s/n MS742	Reconnaissance two-seater		Vicinity of Rakosa	Victory shared with Vladimir Strizhesky
4	8 August 1917	Nieuport 21 s/n N1719	Oefflag C.II s/n 52.63	Pilot killed; observer landed craft in Romanian lines and was captured	Vicinity of Ocna	Victim from Austro-Hungarian Fliegerkompanie 44
5	4 September 1917	Vickers F.B.19 s/n 12	Reconnaissance two-seater	Crashed	Suceava River Valley	Victory shared with Ivan Loiko; victim from Fliegerkompanie 44
u/c	8 September 1917	Vickers F.B.19 s/n 12	Reconnaissance two-seater		Seret	Claim shared with Ivan Loiko and another pilot
6	12 September 1917 @ 1800 hours	Vickers F.B.19 s/n 12	Reconnaissance two-seater	Trailed smoke all the way into a forced landing	Vicinity of Radautz	Victim from Fliegerkompanie 44
7	14 October 1917	Spad VII s/n 1440	Albatros D.III s/n 53.20	Destroyed; pilot killed	Near Gura Solcai, southeast of Radautz	
8	4 November 1917	Spad VII s/n 1446	Fighter		Gura Solcai	Pilot killed in action
9	8 November 1917	Spad VII s/n 1446	Enemy aircraft	Spun down smoking into a crashlanding	North of Radautz	
10	10 November 1917	Spad VII s/n 1440	Hansa-Brandenburg C.I s/n 269.49	Wounded pilot landed damaged plane in friendly territory	Vicinity of Radautz	Victim from Fliegerkompanie 49
