= Royal Aircraft Factory F.E.9 =

British two-seat aircraft

F.E.9
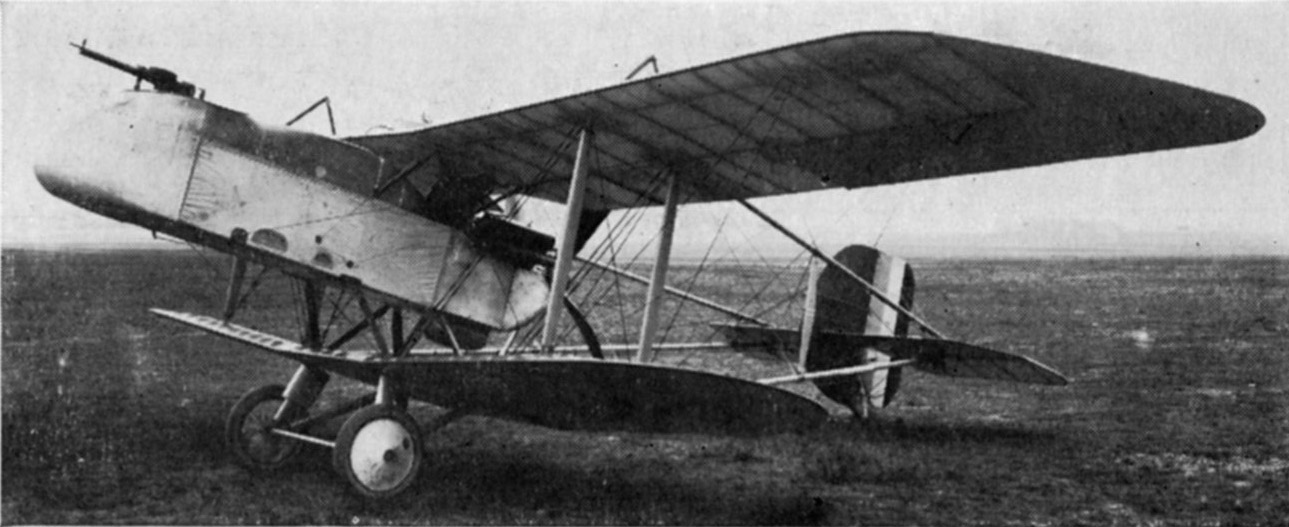
- First prototype F.E.9

General information
- Type: Two-seat fighter aircraft
- National origin: United Kingdom
- Manufacturer: Royal Aircraft Factory
- Number built: 3

The Royal Aircraft Factory F.E.9 was a prototype British two-seat fighter-reconnaissance aircraft of the First World War. A single-engined pusher biplane of 1917, the F.E.9 had poor performance and handling, and only three were built.

== Development and design ==
In summer 1916, the Royal Aircraft Factory set out to design a replacement for its F.E.2 two-seat pusher fighter. Although effective gun synchronising gear was now available, which would allow a tractor design with superior performance to be designed, the factory chose to continue the pusher layout of the F.E.2 in its new two-seat fighter, the F.E.9. Its nacelle extended well forward of the wings and was located high up in the wing gap to give a good field of fire for the observer, who was seated in the nose, ahead of the pilot, with dual controls fitted. It had unequal span, single-bay wings, with ailerons on the upper wing only with large horn balances (the amount of control surface forward of the hinge). It was powered by a 200 hp (149 kW) Hispano-Suiza 8 V8 engine, with the Royal Aircraft Factory having priority for this important and widely used engine.

Three prototypes and 24 production aircraft were ordered, with the first of three prototypes flying in April 1917. It was found to have a poor climb performance and handling, with the ailerons being overbalanced, which tended to force the aircraft onto its back in steep turns. To try to solve its handling problems it was fitted with various designs of aileron and rudders.

After service trials of the first prototype in France, Major General Hugh Trenchard recommended that development be stopped, despite this the second prototype flew in October 1917, with two-bay wings, which was passed to No. 78 Squadron based at Biggin Hill in the Home Defence role. The third prototype appeared in November 1917, and was used for trials at Farnborough until early 1918.

Although the 24 production aircraft were not completed, the F.E.9 did form the basis for the later N.E.1 night fighter and A.E.3 Ram ground attack aircraft.

== Operators ==
United Kingdom

- Royal Flying Corps
  - No. 78 Squadron RFC

== Specifications (final layout) ==
Data from British Aeroplanes 1914-18

General characteristics

- Length: 28 ft 3 in (8.61 m)
- Upper wingspan: 37 ft 9 1/2 in (11.519 m)
- Lower wingspan: 29 ft 5 1/4 in (8.973 m)
- Height: 9 ft 9 in (2.97 m)
- Wing area: 365 sq ft (33.9 m^{2})
- Gross weight: 2,480 lb (1,125 kg)
- Powerplant: 1 × Hispano-Suiza 8 water-cooled V8 engine, 200 hp (150 kW)
- Propellers: 4-bladed, 8 ft 9 in (2.67 m) diameter

Performance

- Maximum speed: 105 mph (169 km/h, 91 kn) at sea level
- Service ceiling: 15,500 ft (4,700 m)
- Time to altitude:
  - 8 min 25 s to 5,000 ft (1,500 m)
  - 19 min 50 s to 10,000 ft (3,000 m)

Armament

- Guns:
  - 1× .303 in Lewis gun on Scarff ring in observer's cockpit
  - 1× Lewis gun on pillar mounting between cockpits

== See also ==
Related development

- Royal Aircraft Factory N.E.1
- Royal Aircraft Factory A.E.3

Aircraft of comparable role, configuration, and era

- Royal Aircraft Factory F.E.2

Related lists

- List of aircraft of the Royal Flying Corps
