= Short S.36 =

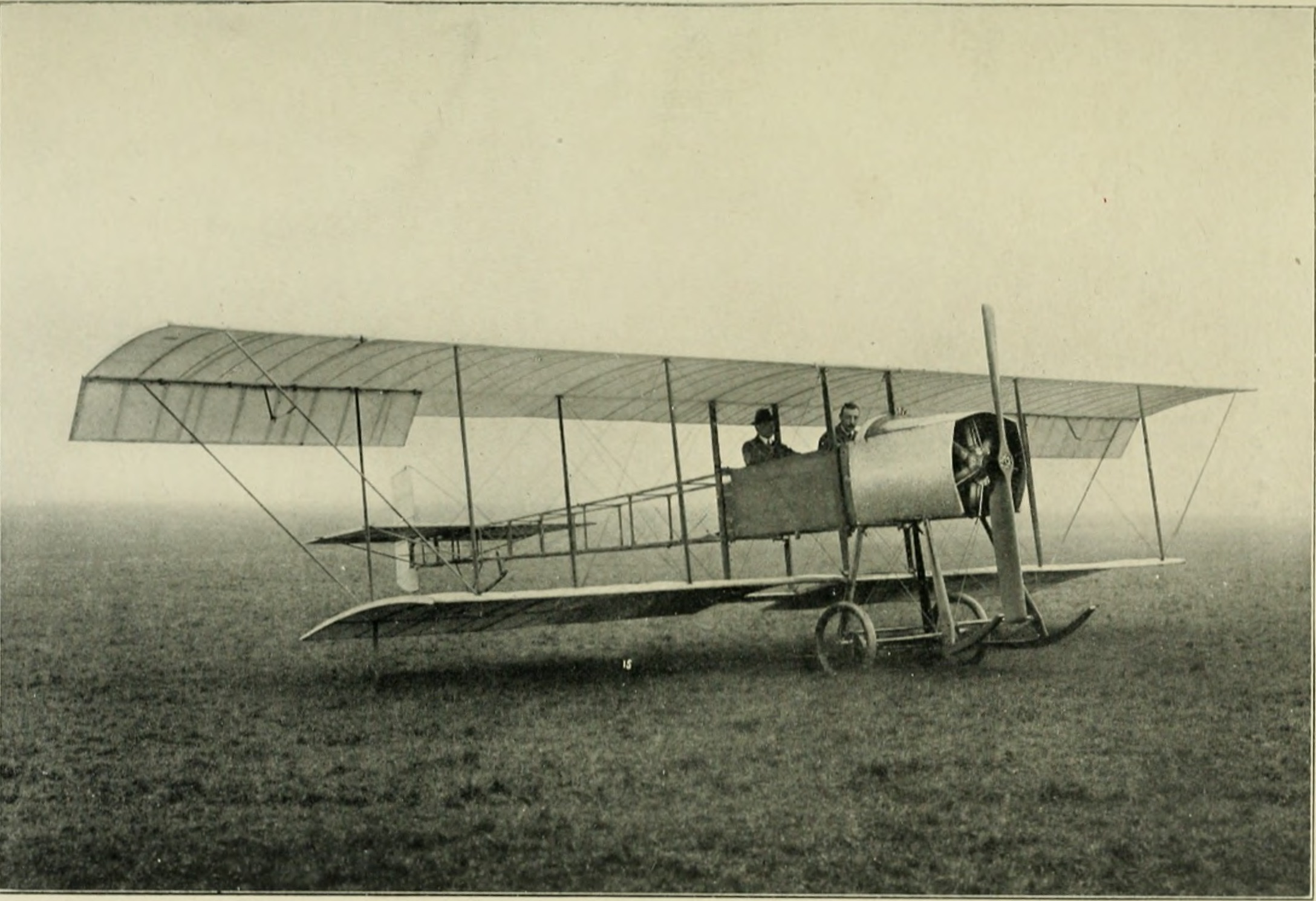
- The Short S.36 two-seat military tractor biplane. Captain EL Gerrard and Mr RO Short seated in their aircraft at Eastchurch, January, 1912.

General information
- Type: Sports aircraft, trainer
- National origin: United Kingdom
- Manufacturer: Short Brothers
- Designer: Horace Short
- Number built: 1

History
- First flight: 10 January 1912
- Variants: Short S.41; Short S.45

The Short S.36 was a British two-seat tractor biplane, built by Short Brothers for Francis McClean in 1911. It was later developed into the Short S.41 and Short S.45, which were the first of a long series of similar aircraft built for the RNAS and RFC.

== Design and development ==
The origination of a tractor biplane design was due to Cecil Grace, who had flown a Blériot tractor monoplane at Blackpool in 1910. Work was begun on a tractor version of the S.27 biplane design powered by a 60 hp (45 kW) E.N.V. Type F, but after Grace's death at the end of the year the project was shelved, the aircraft being completed as a Type S.27. However, when Frank McClean was later shown the design by Horace Short, he asked for one to be built for him, to be powered by a 70 hp (52 kW) Gnome Gamma engine.

As first built, the aircraft was an unequal-span two-seater two-bay biplane, with ailerons fitted to the top wing only. The square section fuselage was mounted in the middle of the gap between the upper and lower wings, and the tail surfaces consisted of a rectangular rudder mounted on the sternpost of the fuselage, with a rectangular horizontal stabiliser and split elevator mounted in front of it on top of the fuselage. The centre section of the lower wing was left uncovered, as was the fuselage aft of the cockpit: the cockpit section of the fuselage was covered with plywood, with aluminium panels at the front enclosing the fuel tanks and extending forwards to form the cowling for the front-mounted 70 hp (52 kW) Gnome Gamma engine. The undercarriage consisted of a pair of wheels below the wing leading edge, supplemented by skids extending forward to protect the propeller in case of a nose-over, and a single sprung tailskid mounted under the rear of the fuselage. The fuselage was subsequently rigged lower down, and the aft section of the fuselage covered with fabric.

== Service history ==
The aircraft was first flown by McClean on 10 January 1912, and performed well, having a short takeoff run and a speed of 60 mph (97 km/h). McClean lent the aircraft to the Naval Flying School at Eastchurch, and on 11 March a flight lasting four hours was made at Eastchurch by Lieut. A.M. Longmore with a mechanic as passenger, landing because the engine was beginning to lose power: there was enough fuel for a further 2 1/2 hours flight, winning the Mortimer Singer Prize for naval officers.

The Admiralty was sufficiently impressed by the aircraft to order two similar aircraft to be built, these becoming the 100 hp (75 kW) Gnome Double Omega-powered Short S.41 and the 70 hp (52 kW) Gnome Gamma-powered Short S.45.

== Specifications ==
Data from Barnes 1967, p.87.

General characteristics

- Crew: one
- Capacity: one
- Length: 35 ft 6 in (10.82 m)
- Wingspan: 46 ft 5 in (14.15 m)
- Wing area: 515 sq ft (47.8 m^{2})
- Empty weight: 850 lb (386 kg)
- Gross weight: 1,300 lb (590 kg)
- Powerplant: 1 × Gnome Gamma 7-cylinder air-cooled rotary piston engine, 70 hp (52 kW)
- Propellers: 2-bladed, 9 ft (2.7 m) diameter

Performance

- Maximum speed: 60 mph (97 km/h, 52 kn)
- Endurance: 6.5 hours
- Wing loading: 3.1 lb/sq ft (15 kg/m^{2})
