= Sopwith Three-seater =

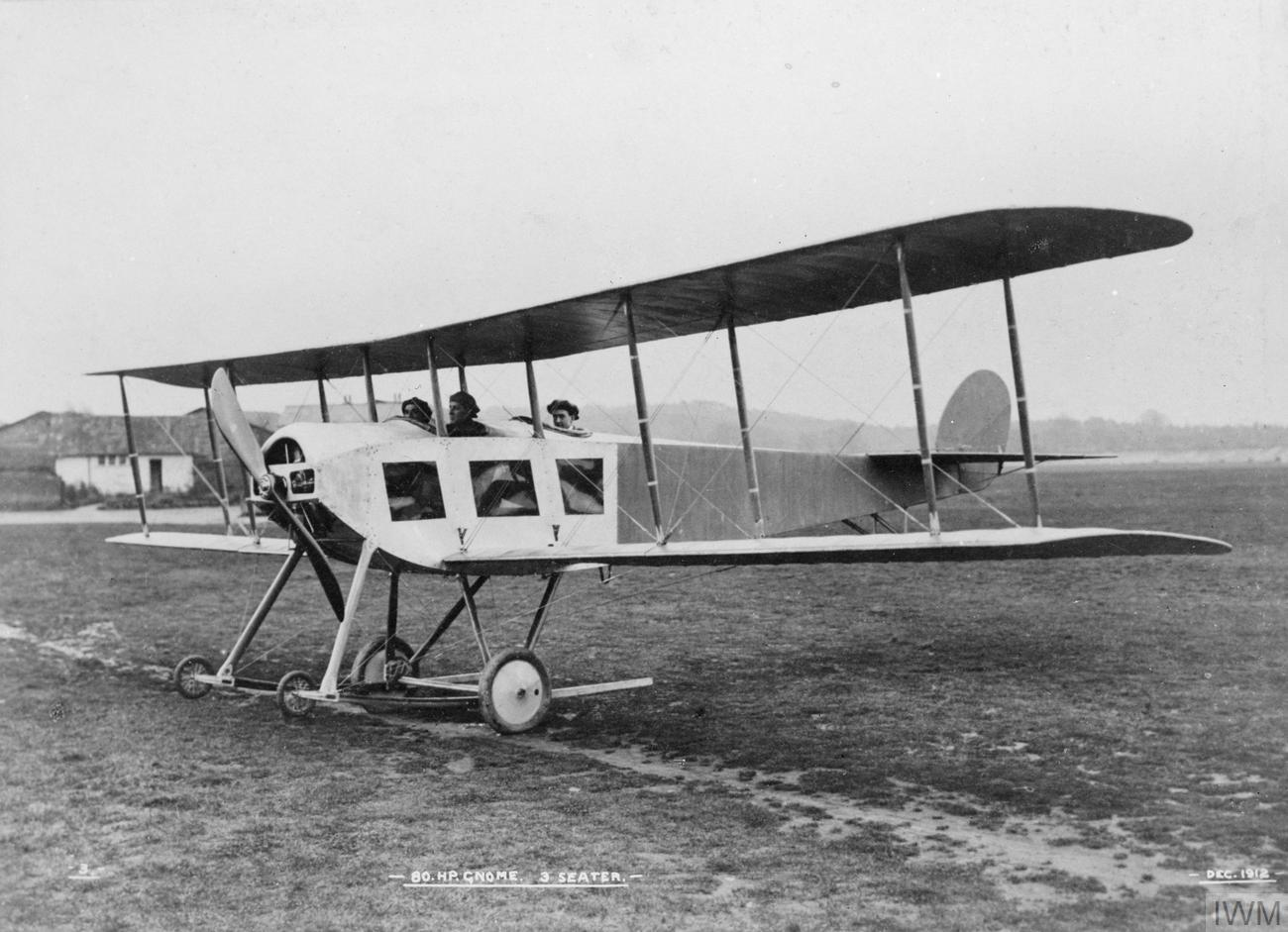

General information
- Type: General purpose aircraft
- National origin: United Kingdom
- Manufacturer: Sopwith Aviation Company
- Designer: Thomas Sopwith
- Primary users: Royal Flying Corps Royal Naval Air Service
- Number built: 13

History
- Introduction date: 1912
- First flight: 4 July 1912
- Retired: 1915

The Sopwith Three-seater was a British aircraft designed and built prior to the start of the First World War. One of the first aircraft built by the Sopwith Aviation Company, it was operated by both the Royal Naval Air Service (RNAS) and the Royal Flying Corps (RFC), being used briefly over Belgium by the RNAS following the start of the War.

== Development and design ==
In 1912, Thomas Sopwith, who had learned to fly during 1910 and had set up a flying school at Brooklands, built a tractor configuration biplane using the wings from a Wright Biplane and the fuselage and tail of a Coventry Ordnance Works biplane. and powered by a 70 hp (52 kW) Gnome Gamma rotary engine. The resulting aircraft, known as the Hybrid, first flew on 4 July 1912.

The Hybrid was rebuilt in October 1912 and sold to the British Admiralty, being delivered in November 1912. When the Admiralty tendered further orders for an improved tractor biplane based on the design, Sopwith created the Sopwith Aviation Company, with a factory in a disused roller rink at Kingston upon Thames. The resulting aircraft, known variously as the Three-Seat Tractor Biplane, the Sopwith 80 hp Biplane, the Sopwith D1, or the Sopwith Tractor Biplane, was flown on 7 February 1913 before being displayed at the International Aero Show at Olympia, London opening on 14 February. It had two-bay wings, with lateral control by wing warping, and was powered by an 80 hp (60 kW) Gnome Lambda rotary engine. It had two cockpits positioned fore and aft, the passengers seated side by side up front and the pilot in the rear. Three transparent celluloid windows were placed in each side of the fuselage to give a good downwards view.

A second aircraft was retained by Sopwith as a demonstrator, being used to set a number of British altitude records between June and July 1913. A further two tractor biplanes were built for the RNAS, being delivered in August and September 1913, with the original hybrid being rebuilt to a similar standard. Following tests of a Tractor Biplane fitted with ailerons instead of wing warping for lateral control, a further nine aircraft were ordered for the Royal Flying Corps (RFC) in September 1913.

== Operational history ==
The RFC received its Three-seaters between November 1913 and March 1914, with the first example being tested to destruction in the Royal Aircraft Factory at Farnborough, where it was determined that the structural strength was inadequate. Despite this, the remaining eight aircraft were issued to No. 5 Squadron as two-seaters. Two were destroyed in a fatal mid-air collision on 12 May 1914, while several more were wrecked in accidents before the outbreak of the First World War. 5 Squadron left its remaining Tractor Biplanes in England when it deployed to France in August 1914, these being briefly used as trainers at the Central Flying School.

The RNAS aircraft were issued to seaplane stations to allow flying to continue when sea conditions were unsuitable for seaplane operation. On the outbreak of war, the RNAS also acquired Sopwith's demonstrator aircraft. Three Sopwith Tractor biplanes went with the Eastchurch wing of the RNAS when it deployed to Belgium under the command of Wing Commander C.R. Samson. These were used for reconnaissance and bombing missions, attempting to bomb the Zeppelin sheds at Düsseldorf on 23 September and railway lines on 24 September, and were withdrawn from service in October. The RNAS also used Sopwith Tractor Biplanes for patrol duties from Great Yarmouth, one remaining in use until November 1915.

== Operators ==
United Kingdom

- Royal Flying Corps
  - No. 5 Squadron RFC
  - Central Flying School
- Royal Naval Air Service

== Specifications (80 hp Gnome) ==
Data from Sopwith-The Man and his Aircraft.

General characteristics

- Crew: 1
- Capacity: 3 passengers
- Length: 29 ft 6 in (8.99 m)
- Wingspan: 40 ft 0 in (12.19 m)
- Wing area: 397 sq ft (36.9 m^{2})
- Empty weight: 1,060 lb (481 kg)
- Gross weight: 1,810 lb (821 kg)
- Powerplant: 1 × Gnome rotary engine, 80 hp (60 kW)
- Propellers: 2-bladed 2600D Chauviere, 8 ft 6 in (2.59 m) diameter

Performance

- Maximum speed: 74 mph (119 km/h, 64 kn)
- Endurance: 2.5 hr
- Service ceiling: 12,900 ft (3,900 m) with one passenger
- Time to altitude: 2.5 min to 1,000 ft (300 m)

== See also ==
Related lists

- List of aircraft of the Royal Naval Air Service
- List of aircraft of the Royal Flying Corps
