= Vickers F.B.25 =

British two-seat night fighter prototype

F.B.25
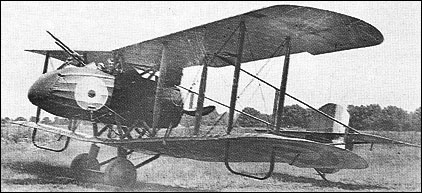

General information
- Type: Two-seat night fighter
- Manufacturer: Vickers
- Primary user: Royal Flying Corps
- Number built: 1

History
- First flight: Spring 1917

The Vickers F.B.25 was a British two-seat night fighter prototype of World War I designed to attack enemy airships. Completed in 1917, it failed in its official flight tests that year and no order for production resulted.

== Design ==
In 1916, Vickers Limited designed a two-seat pusher configuration biplane fighter, the F.B.23, to replace its obsolete Vickers F.B.5 and F.B.9 "Gunbuses". A number of versions of the FB.23 were planned depending on the engine used, with possible powerplants including a 150 hp (119 kW) Salmson water-cooled radial engine, a 150 hp Hart air-cooled radial engine and a 200 hp (149 kW) Hispano-Suiza 8 V-8 engine. The pusher configuration was obsolete however, compared to prospective tractor aircraft such as the Bristol F.2 Fighter, which was both faster than the estimated performance of the F.B.23 and carried a heavier armament, so Vickers abandoned the F.B.23 without an example being built.

Vickers reworked the F.B.23 to form the basis of a two-seat night-fighter, the F.B.25, to compete with the Royal Aircraft Factory N.E.1 to meet a British requirement for a night fighter capable of attacking German airships. The F.B.25 used an identical tail and tail boom assembly to the F.B.23, but had modified wings and a completely new fuselage nacelle.

The F.B.25 was a two-bay biplane with unstaggered wings of equal span. Its nacelle was mounted between the wings, was unusually wide for an aircraft of its type in its day, and accommodated the two-man crew, a pilot and a gunner, in staggered side-by-side seats, with the gunner's seat ahead and to starboard of the pilot's. The gunner was armed with a single 1.59-inch Breech-Loading Vickers Q.F. Gun, Mk II, popularly known as the "Vickers-Crayford rocket gun," which despite its popular name was a lightweight 40 mm single-shot gun that fired shells and had no rocket-launching capability. Its tailbooms converged in elevation to meet at the rear spar of the tailplane. It had a single propeller, mounted in a pusher configuration. The aircraft had an oleo-pneumatic undercarriage, an unusual feature for the time.

Plans called for the F.B.25 to mount a small searchlight in the nacelle's nose, have a nosewheel to reduce the chance of the aircraft turning over during night landings, and use the same 200-horsepower (149-kilowatt) Hispano-Suiza 8 planned for the F.B.23. As design and construction progressed, Vickers made changes; the searchlight and nosewheel were deleted, and as the 200-horsepower engine was unavailable, Vickers substituted a 150-horsepower (112-kilowatt) Hispano-Suiza.

== Operational history ==
Vickers completed the F.B.25 prototype in the early spring of 1917. Company flight testing revealed poor characteristics. The prototype was sent to Martlesham Heath in June–July 1917 for official testing, and official reports declared that the F.B.25 had poor control characteristics, being "very dangerous" with the engine off, and "almost unmanageable in a wind over 20 miles per hour" (32 km/h). The aircraft was condemned as being completely unsuited for use as a night fighter. No further aircraft were built, and the lone F.B.25 later crashed at Martlesham Heath.

== Variants ==
F.B.23
Proposed two-seat fighter. Three versions planned with different powerplants. All unbuilt.

F.B.23

150 hp (119 kW) Salmson water-cooled radial engine

F.B.23A

150 hp Hart air-cooled radial engine.

F.B.23B

200 hp (149 kW) Hispano-Suiza 8 engine.

F.B.25
Two-seat night-fighter based on F.B.23 but with side-by-side seating. One built, powered by 150 hp Hispano-Suiza engine.

== Operators ==
United Kingdom

- Royal Flying Corps

== Specifications ==
Data from War Planes of the First World War:Volume Three Fighters

General characteristics

- Crew: 2
- Length: 28 ft 1 in (8.56 m)
- Wingspan: 42 ft 6 in (12.95 m)
- Height: 11 ft 1 in (3.38 m)
- Wing area: 500 sq ft (46 m^{2})
- Empty weight: 1,608 lb (729 kg)
- Gross weight: 2,454 lb (1,113 kg)
- Powerplant: 1 × Hispano-Suiza 8 water-cooled V-8 engine, 150 hp (110 kW)

Performance

- Maximum speed: 86 mph (138 km/h, 75 kn) at 5,000 ft (1,500 m)
- Endurance: 4 hr
- Service ceiling: 11,500 ft (3,500 m)
- Time to altitude:
  - 11 min 55 s to 6,000 ft (1,800 m)
  - 27 min 10 s to 10,000 ft (3,000 m)

Armament

- Guns: 1 x 1.59-inch (40 mm) Breech-Loading Vickers Q.F. Gun, Mk II

== See also ==
Aircraft of comparable role, configuration, and era

- Royal Aircraft Factory N.E.1
