= Royal Aircraft Factory A.E.3 =

A.E.3 / Farnborough Ram

General information
- Type: Ground attack aircraft
- National origin: United Kingdom
- Manufacturer: Royal Aircraft Factory
- Number built: 3

History
- First flight: 1918
- Developed from: Royal Aircraft Factory N.E.1

The Royal Aircraft Factory A.E.3 (Armed or Armoured Experimental), also known as the Farnborough Ram, was a prototype British armoured ground attack aircraft of the First World War. The A.E.3, which was a development of the Royal Aircraft Factory's N.E.1 night fighter, was a two-seat single-engined pusher biplane. Three were built in 1918, but the type was unsuccessful, with no further production ensuing.

== Development and design ==
In late 1917, the Royal Aircraft Factory started development of a two-seat, heavily armoured contact patrol aircraft for the Royal Flying Corps, designed to carry out observation in contact with the infantry, a job that required flying at low altitudes over the front line, exposing the aircraft to heavy small-arms fire from the enemy's trenches. Three prototypes of the resulting design, designated A.E.3, were ordered. It was a single-engined pusher biplane, based on the N.E.1 night fighter. It retained much of the structure of the N.E.1, including the outer wings, undercarriage, tailplane and tail booms, but had a new armoured nacelle constructed completely of armour plate. Two Lewis guns were fitted on an armoured mounting in the front of the nacelle that allowed the guns to be depressed to attack targets below, while another Lewis gun was mounted on a pillar mounting between the gunner and pilot to defend the aircraft from attack.

The A.E.1 was originally intended to be powered by the same Hispano-Suiza engine that had powered the N.E.1, but there were severe shortages of this engine, with over 400 S.E.5A fighters waiting incomplete due to lack of engines in January 1918, and it was decided to use alternative engines, with the Sunbeam Arab being chosen for the first prototype, and the Bentley BR.2 rotary engine (which would have been used if the aircraft was chosen for production) for the second.

The first A.E.1 flew during April 1918, with the second prototype following on 1 June 1918, while the third prototype, which was powered by an Arab engine, and fitted with face-hardened armour, was finished later that month. By this time the Royal Aircraft Factory had been renamed the Royal Aircraft Establishment, and the A.E.1 was given the name Farnborough Ram, the only Royal Aircraft Factory designed aircraft to be given an official name, with the Arab powered aircraft being named Ram I and the Bentley powered aircraft Ram II.

The Ram II was sent to France at the end of June, for trials in its suitability for operational use. These were not successful, with the Ram being considered slow, heavy on the controls and unsuitable for manoeuvering near the ground. Following these trials, Major General John Salmond, the commander of the RAF in the field, stated in a letter to the Air Ministry that "I do not consider this machine as useful for any military purpose ... I would recommend that all further work on this machine should cease." No further development followed this condemnation.

== Specifications (Ram I) ==
Data from The British Fighter since 1912

General characteristics

- Crew: Two
- Length: 27 ft 8 1/2 in (8.446 m)
- Wingspan: 47 ft 10 1/2 in (14.592 m)
- Height: 10 ft 0 in (3.05 m)
- Wing area: 550 sq ft (51 m^{2})
- Powerplant: 1 × Sunbeam Arab water-cooled V8 engine, 200 hp (150 kW)

Performance

- Maximum speed: 95 mph (153 km/h, 83 kn)

Armament

- Guns: 3× .303 in Lewis guns

== See also ==
Related development

- Royal Aircraft Factory F.E.9
- Royal Aircraft Factory N.E.1

Aircraft of comparable role, configuration, and era

- Sopwith Salamander
- Junkers J.I
- AEG J.I
- Albatros J.I
