= Gnome Gamma =

1910s French aircraft piston engine

Gamma
- Type: Rotary aero engine
- Manufacturer: Gnome et Rhone
- First run: c. 1911
- Major applications: Blériot XXI; Handley Page H.P.3

The Gnome 7 Gamma was a French designed, seven-cylinder, air-cooled rotary aero engine. Powering several pre-World War I era aircraft types it produced 70 horsepower (52 kW) from its capacity of 12 litres (680 cubic inches).

A 14-cylinder variant was known as the Gnome 14 Gamma-Gamma.

== Variants ==
Gnome 7 Gamma
Seven-cylinder, single-row rotary engine.
Gnome 14 Gamma-Gamma
14-cylinder, two-row rotary engine using Gamma cylinders. 140 hp (104 kW).

== Applications ==
List from Lumsden

=== Gnome 7 Gamma ===
- Blériot XXI
- Bristol Biplane Type T
- Bristol Prier-Dickson
- Henry Farman Biplane
- Grahame-White Passenger Biplane VIIc
- Handley Page H.P.3
- Morane-Borel seaplane
- Nieuport Monoplane
- Paulhan Biplane
- Royal Aircraft Factory B.E.3
- Royal Aircraft Factory B.E.4
- Short School Biplane
- Short S.32
- Short S.36
- Short S.38
- Short S.45
- Sopwith Three-Seater
- Vickers No.6 Monoplane
- Vickers No.8 Monoplane

=== Gnome 14 Gamma-Gamma ===
- Royal Aircraft Factory B.E.7
- Short S.41

== Specifications (Gnome 7 Gamma) ==
Data from Lumsden.

=== General characteristics ===
- Type: 7-cylinder, single-row, rotary engine
- Bore: 120 mm (4.7 in)
- Stroke: 130 mm (5.1 in)
- Displacement: 11.14 L (679.84 cu in)
- Length: 112.7 cm (44.4 in)
- Diameter: 86.9 cm (34.2 in)

=== Components ===
- Valvetrain: Automatic centre-piston inlet valve, overhead exhaust valve (one each per cylinder)
- Cooling system: Air-cooled
- Reduction gear: Direct drive, right-hand tractor, left-hand pusher

=== Performance ===
- Power output: 52.2 kW (70 hp) at 1,200 rpm

== See also ==
Comparable engines

- Anzani 10-cylinder
- Clerget 7Z
- Le Rhône 9C

Related lists

- List of aircraft engines
