= Short S.41 =

British single-engined biplane

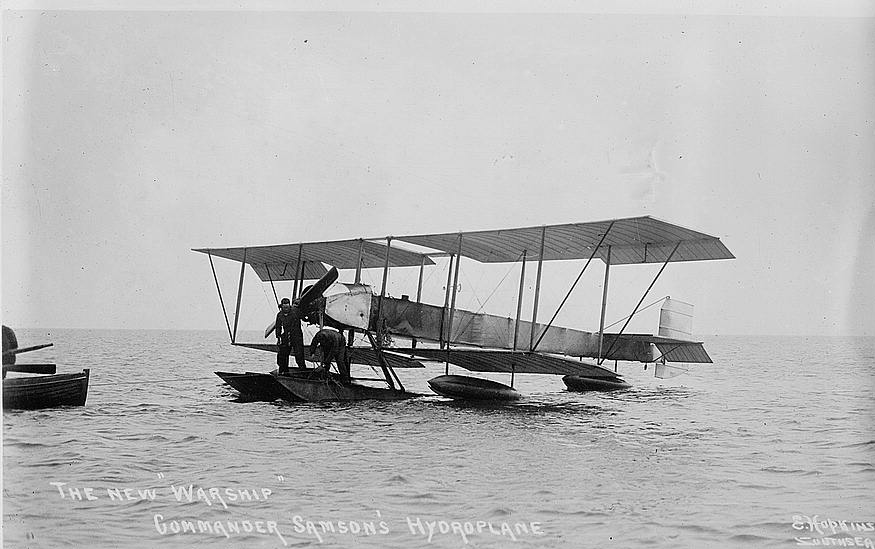

General information
- Type: Floatplane
- National origin: United Kingdom
- Manufacturer: Short Brothers
- Primary user: Royal Naval Air Service
- Number built: 3 (S.41, S.51 and S.52)

History
- Introduction date: 1912
- First flight: 2 April 1912
- Developed from: Short S.36

The Short S.41 was a British single-engined biplane built for the Royal Navy in 1912. Capable of being operated either on wheels or floats, it was successful enough for a further two similar aircraft to be built, with the type remaining in use until the early years of the First World War.

== Development and design ==
In 1912, the Short S.36 tractor biplane, built for Francis McClean, was loaned to the Royal Navy for use at its Naval Flying School. Impressed by the S.36, the Admiralty ordered two similar tractor biplanes, capable of operating on either wheels or floats, the smaller Short S.45, like the S.36, powered by a 70 hp (52 kW) Gnome Gamma, and the larger Short S.41 powered by a 14-cylinder, twin-row 100 hp (75 kW) Gnome double Omega rotary engine.

The S.41 was an unequal-span two bay tractor biplane with a slim rectangular section fuselage mounted between the wings. It was first flown by Charles Rumney Samson on 2 April 1912 with a wheeled undercarriage, and shortly afterwards was fitted with floats, consisting of two main pontoons under the fuselage and smaller floats at the wingtips and tail, and was delivered to the Navy.

Following the operational flights made during 1912, S.41 was returned to the factory for an overhaul and the fitting of folding wings, which were hinged so that they folded back horizontally alongside the fuselage, reducing storage space required for stowage aboard ship. At this time it was given the RNAS number "10". In November 1913 it underwent further modifications, being used to perfect a development of the folding mechanism which allowed the wings to be unfolded from the cockpit: at the same time new wings, similar in pattern to those of the Short Admiralty Type 81 were fitted.

The folding wing mechanism for shipborne aircraft had been designed by Horace Short, and was the subject of a series of patents

== Operational history ==
The S.41 was flown successfully at the Fleet Review at Weymouth on 8 May, being based on the Battleship HMS Hibernia. It was also used by Samson to carry out survey flights of potential sites for seaplane stations, which led to the establishment of the seaplane station at Felixstowe, and for early trials with use of radio from aircraft.

The success of the S.41 was such that two similar aircraft, constructor's numbers S.51 and S.52, also powered by the two-row Gnome, were ordered by the RNAS, with serial numbers 20 and 21: These were first flown in April 1913. These aircraft differed in detail from the first aircraft: the wing section was improved, double-acting ailerons were fitted and the overhanging section of the upper wing was braced by kingposts rather than struts.

Like 10, they were used for trials of airborne radio, as well as carrying out tests of beaching gear. They remained in use at the start of the First World War, where, despite the unreliability of the twin-row Gnome, they were used for anti-submarine patrols early in the war, 20 continuing in use from the seaplane station at Great Yarmouth until July 1915.

== Variants ==
A single aircraft, similar in design to the S.41 but slightly smaller, was built by Shorts and exhibited at the 1913 Aero Show at Olympia, London, featuring a number of refinements including manganese-steel tube interplane struts and provision for starting the engine from the cockpit. This had the Shorts manufacturer's number S.53, and was later bought by the Admiralty and given RNAS No. 42, thereby becoming known as the Admiralty Type 42. It was first flown as a seaplane but later fitted with a wheeled undercarriage: in this form it was one of the aircraft which were sent to Ostend at the outbreak of World War I: it was written off by Samson on 28 September 1914 when it crashed on takeoff due to engine failure.

== Operators ==
United Kingdom

- Royal Naval Air Service

== Specifications (S.41 seaplane) ==
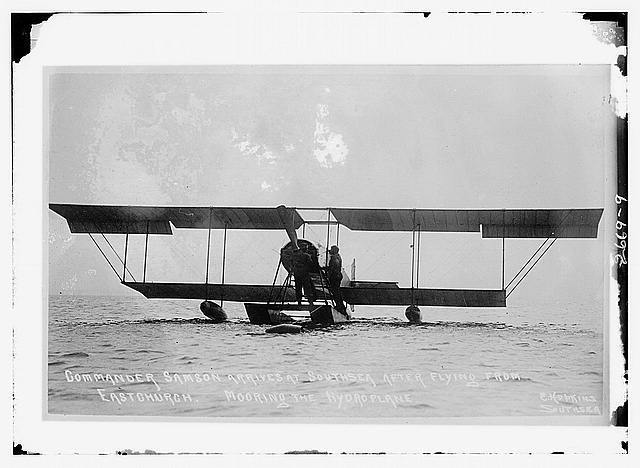

Data from Shorts Aircraft since 1900

General characteristics

- Crew: two
- Length: 39 ft (12 m) as seaplane: length as landplane 36 ft 6 in (11.15 m)
- Wingspan: 50 ft (15 m)
- Height: 11 ft 9 in (3.58 m)
- Wing area: 450 sq ft (42 m^{2})
- Empty weight: 1,100 lb (499 kg)
- Gross weight: 1,600 lb (726 kg)
- Powerplant: 1 × Gnome Double Omega 14-cylinder, two-row rotary engine, 100 hp (75 kW)

Performance

- Maximum speed: 60 mph (97 km/h, 52 kn)
- Endurance: 5 hrs

== See also ==
Related lists

- List of aircraft of the Royal Naval Air Service
- List of flying boats and floatplanes
