= Vickers E.S.1 =

E.S.1
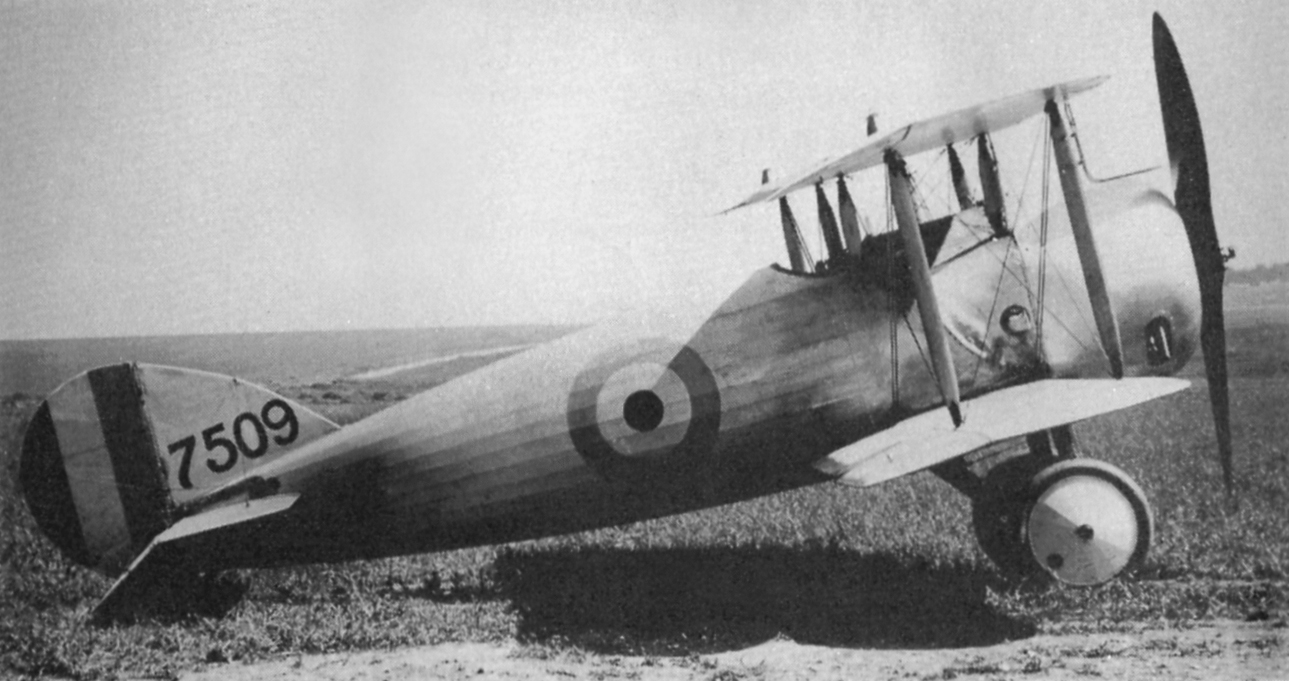

General information
- Type: Fighter aircraft
- National origin: United Kingdom
- Manufacturer: Vickers Limited
- Designer: Rex Pierson
- Primary user: Royal Flying Corps
- Number built: 3

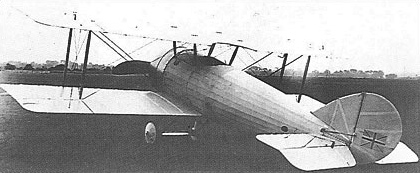

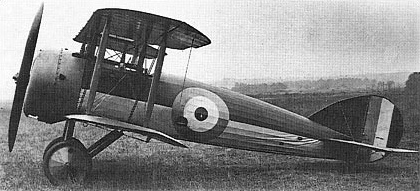

The Vickers E.S.1 was an early British Fighter aircraft of the First World War. A single-seat biplane, only three E.S.1s were built, although at least one was used by a home defence squadron of the Royal Flying Corps.

== Development and design ==
In late 1914, Harold Barnwell, chief test pilot with Vickers Limited, designed a single-seat "scout" or fast reconnaissance aircraft, and had it built without the knowledge or approval of his employers, "borrowing" a Gnome Monosoupape rotary engine from Vickers' stores to power the aircraft. Barnwell attempted a first flight of his design, named the "Barnwell Bullet" in early 1915, but the aircraft crashed and was wrecked, possibly due to a miscalculated centre of gravity. Now aware of Barnwell's design, Vickers instructed their junior designer Rex Pierson to redesign the Bullet.

The redesigned aircraft, the Vickers E.S.1 (Experimental Scout), was a single-seat tractor biplane of fabric-covered wooden construction. It had single-bay unstaggered wings with ailerons on both the upper and lower wings. Like the Barnwell Bullet, the E.S.1 was powered by a Monosoupape engine, closely cowled into a circular-section fuselage. The pilot's cockpit was situated under the trailing edge of the upper wing, from which the view both downwards and upwards was poor.

The E.S.1 first flew in August 1915, and was found to be extremely fast (a speed of 118 mph (190 km/h) was claimed by Vickers), and being capable of gaining height on a loop. Following operational trials in France, it was fitted with a modified cowling to allow fuel to drain away from the engine, and was armed with a forward-firing Vickers machine gun with the Vickers-Challenger gun synchroniser allowing the gun to fire through the propeller disc. A further two aircraft were built, powered by a 110 hp (82 kW) Clerget or Le Rhône engine. These aircraft had a modified fuselage and a large cutout in the upper wing to improve the view for the pilot, and were designated Vickers E.S.1 Mark II.^{[a]} No further production followed, with the aircraft being noted as being tiring to fly and difficult to land, although it did form the basis for the Vickers F.B.19.

== Operational history ==
The unarmed E.S.1 was sent to France for operational trials at Saint-Omer in France in 1916, where it was criticised for the poor view for the pilot and for the fact that if the engine was mishandled, petrol could collect in the cowling and catch fire. It was finally badly damaged in a crash when flown by Captain Patrick Playfair. After rebuilding and arming with a synchronised Vickers gun, the modified E.F.1 Mk I was sent to No. 50 (Home Defence) Squadron.

== Operators ==
United Kingdom

- Royal Flying Corps

== Specifications (E.S.1 Mk II, Clerget engine) ==
Data from Vickers Aircraft since 1908

General characteristics

- Crew: One
- Length: 20 ft 3 in (6.17 m)
- Wingspan: 24 ft 5 1/2 in (7.455 m)
- Height: 8 ft 0 in (2.44 m)
- Wing area: 215 sq ft (20.0 m^{2})
- Empty weight: 981 lb (445 kg)
- Gross weight: 1,502 lb (681 kg)
- Powerplant: 1 × Clerget 9-cylinder rotary engine, 110 hp (82 kW)

Performance

- Maximum speed: 112 mph (180 km/h, 97 kn) at sea level
- Endurance: 2 hr
- Service ceiling: 15,500 ft (4,700 m)
- Rate of climb: 1,000 ft/min (5.1 m/s)
- Time to altitude: 18 min to 10,000 ft (3,050 m)

Armament

- Guns: 1× forward firing .303 in Vickers machine gun

== See also ==
Aircraft of comparable role, configuration, and era

- Bristol Scout
- Sopwith Pup

Related lists

- List of aircraft of the Royal Flying Corps

== Notes ==
- ^{a} Also sometimes called Vickers E.S.2, although contemporary reports all refer to these aircraft as E.S.1s.
