= 1.59-inch breech-loading Vickers Q.F. gun, Mk II =

1.59-inch breech-loading Vickers Q.F. Gun, Mk II
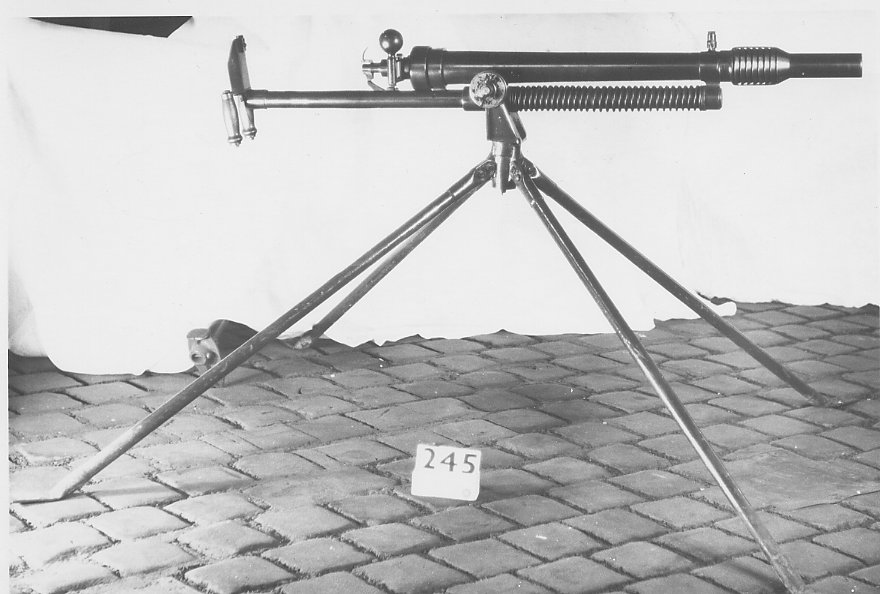
- The gun displayed on a non-standard mounting in 1917
- Type: Light field gun and aerial cannon
- Place of origin: United Kingdom

Service history
- In service: 1917
- Used by: United Kingdom
- Wars: World War I

Production history
- Manufacturer: Vickers

Specifications
- Mass: 47 lb (21.3 kg); 90 lb (41 kg) including mounting stock and yoke-pintle
- Crew: 1
- Shell: Incendiary, AP, and HE cartridges
- Shell weight: 1.2 lbs (0.54 kg) (high-explosive shell)
- Calibre: 1.59 in (40 mm)
- Breech: Simple block
- Recoil: 7 to 7.5 in (148 to 159 mm)
- Rate of fire: 50 rounds in 30 minutes from aircraft reported
- Muzzle velocity: Incendiary: 800 ft/s (244 m/s); AP: 1,000 ft/s (305 m/s); HE: 780 ft/s (238 m/s)

The 1.59-inch breech-loading Vickers Q.F. gun, Mk II was a British infantry support gun designed during World War I. Originally intended for use in trench warfare, it was instead tested for air-to-air and air-to-ground use by aircraft. Although it fired shells and had no capability to launch rockets, it was widely but misleadingly known as the "Vickers-Crayford rocket gun."

== Design ==
Vickers designed the gun early in World War I, intending it for use by British infantry in trenches to attack German machine gun emplacements and pillboxes. To make it portable for infantry use, it was very small and light for a gun of its calibre. Its light construction dictated a low muzzle velocity, which resulted in it having a short range. It was too light to withstand the detonation of standard British explosive propellants, so its ammunition used ballistite packed in cambric bags instead. The gun fired a 1.2-pound (0.54 kg) high-explosive shell at 800 feet (244 meters) per second; it also could fire an armour-piercing round at 1,000 feet (305 meters) per second. The gun's 40x79R cartridge was a shortened version of the naval 40x158R anti-aircraft cartridge, with the shell case reduced from 158 mm (6.22 inches) to 79 mm (3.11 inches) in length.

For ease of use in trenches, the gun was single shot; the gunner had to extract the empty case of a fired cartridge manually and reload the gun after firing each round, which gave it a low rate of fire. It had a simple block breech with percussion gear, and was mounted on a non-recoiling frame consisting of a hydraulic buffer, trunnion block, and rear guide tube. Hand grips were mounted on the guide tube. The gun had a large muzzle brake to reduce recoil.

Vickers manufactured the gun at its plant in Crayford, England.

== Operational history ==
The concept of using the 1.59-inch breech-loading Vickers Q.F. gun, Mk II in the trenches was superseded by that of the trench mortar, which was simpler, cheaper, easily portable, and more effective.

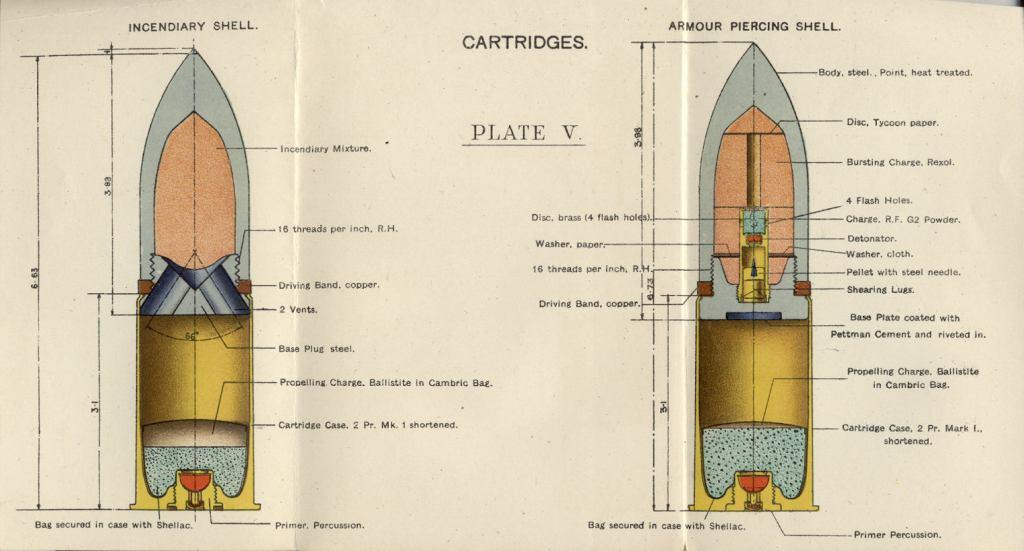
Incendiary (left) and armour-piercing (right) rounds for the 1.59-inch breech-loading Vickers Q.F. gun, Mk II

With the gun no longer wanted in the trenches, it was decided to adapt it for use on aircraft as an air-to-air weapon against airships and observation balloons and for use against ground targets such as trains, ammunition dumps, and tanks. When mounted aboard aircraft, the gun could fire incendiary, armour-piercing, and high-explosive cartridges. The incendiary shell in flight emitted very hot flames from two openings in its base, which made it look as if the gun had fired a rocket; this led to the gun's misleading but widely used name of "Vickers-Crayford rocket gun".

The gun was approved for aircraft use in 1917. For operational testing, it was fitted to F.E.2b aircraft of Nos. 100 and 102 squadrons, Royal Flying Corps, in April 1917. The squadrons tested it on night operations and reported mixed results. No. 102 Squadron's Captain T. J. C. Martin, an F.E.2b pilot, reported that his observer stopped a train after firing about 30 rounds at it, and that it took his observer 30 minutes to fire 50 aimed rounds; he submitted an enthusiastic report on the gun and its potential. No. 100 Squadron, however, reported problems with the gun: Its report stated, "Sometimes the shell does not leave the barrel for some time after the striker has been released;" in one incident, a gunner who thought the gun had misfired was about to open the breech to remove what he thought was a hung round when the shell went off in a shower of sparks. This led the squadron to require gunners to wait five minutes before removing a misfire. The gun also suffered from weak trigger springs and some of its shells had defective primers.

The British hoped that the gun would prove useful in attacking German airships over the United Kingdom, mounted on British fighters so as to be able to fire upward into an airship flying above the fighter. Plans to mount the gun on the Parnall Scout fighter apparently did not come to fruition. At the request of the War Office, Vickers built a single prototype of the Vickers F.B.25 two-seat night fighter to employ the gun, but the F.B.25 failed official tests and crashed in May 1917 on the way to Martlesham Heath. The Royal Aircraft Factory N.E.1 night fighter was also constructed to the same specification to carry the gun; though it flew well, it lacked the performance for use as a night-fighter.

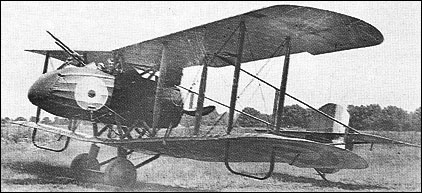
The lone Vickers F.B.25 night fighter prototype, mounting a 1.59-inch breech-loading Vickers Q.F. gun, Mk II in its forward cockpit

After the failure of both the F.B.25 and N.E.1 to win production orders, interest in operational employment of the 1.59-inch breech-loading Vickers Q.F. gun, Mk II appears to have waned; moreover, the introduction of an incendiary round for use in machine guns had made aerial use of the gun less desirable. The gun was withdrawn from use entirely, apparently after the end of World War I, except for use by specially trained personnel.

== See also ==
- COW 37 mm gun
