= Royal Aircraft Factory N.E.1 =

N.E.1
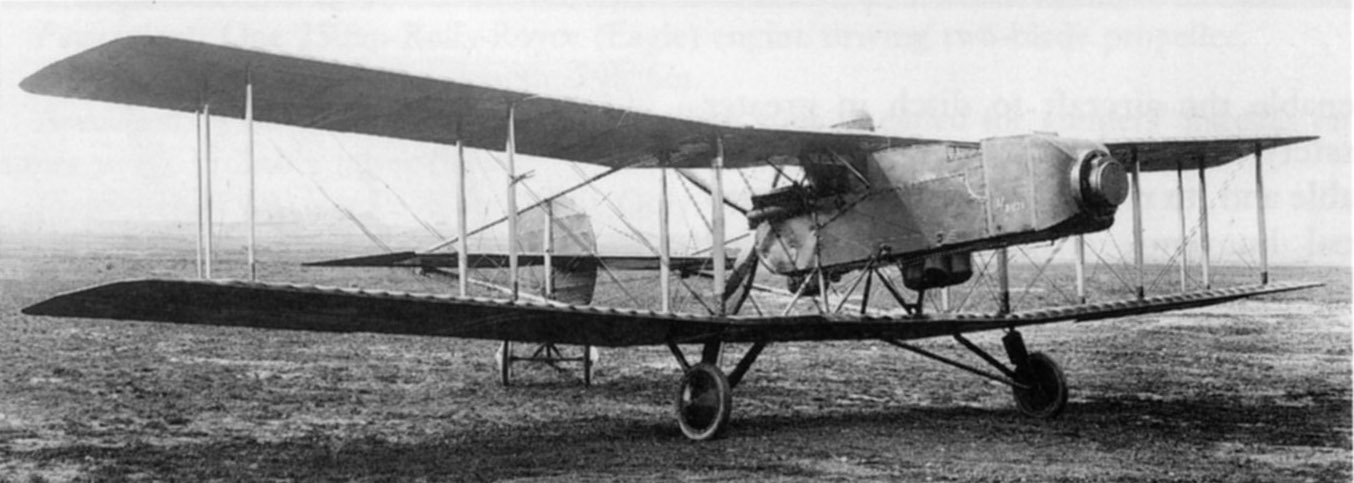
- The first prototype N.E.1 in its original configuration, with a searchlight in the nose

General information
- Type: Night fighter
- National origin: United Kingdom
- Manufacturer: Royal Aircraft Factory
- Number built: 6

History
- First flight: 8 September 1917
- Developed from: Royal Aircraft Factory F.E.9
- Variant: Royal Aircraft Factory A.E.3

The Royal Aircraft Factory N.E.1 was a prototype British night fighter of the First World War. A single-engined pusher biplane, it was a development of the Royal Aircraft Factory's earlier F.E.9 fighter, but was not successful, only six being built.

== Development and design ==
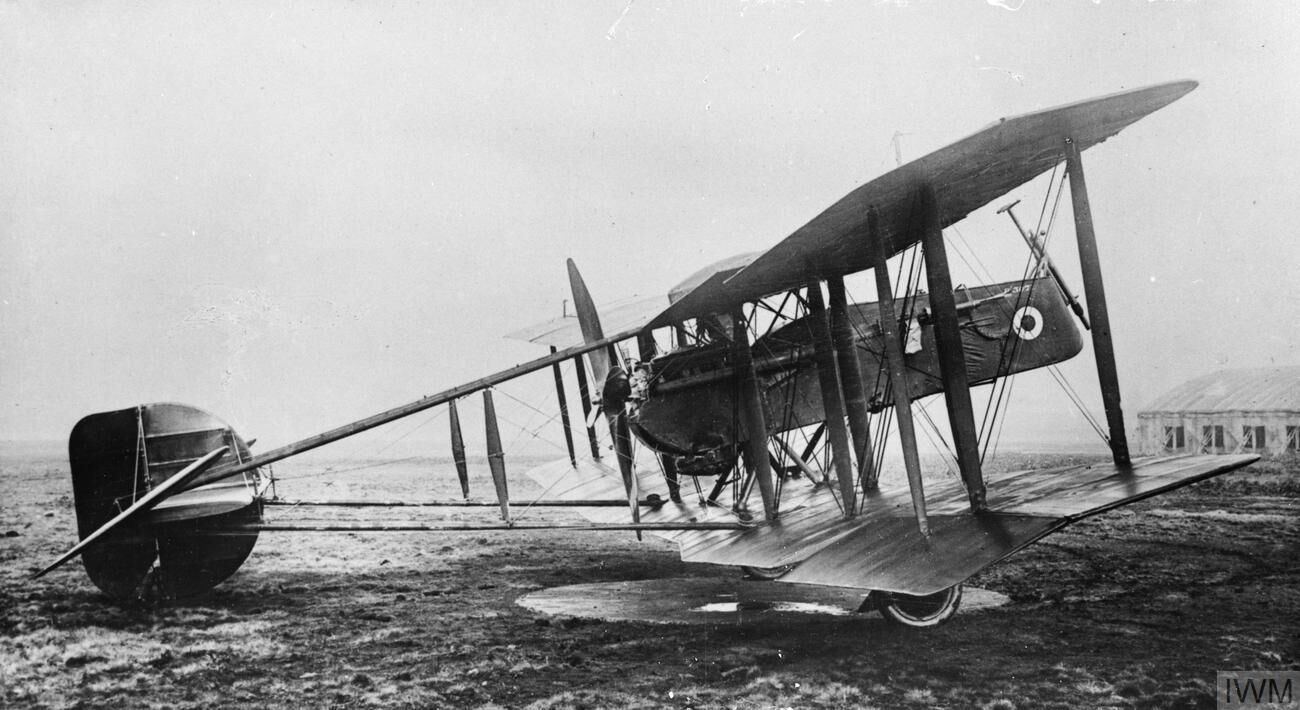
A version with a gun mounted in the bow cockpit.

In 1917, the British Royal Aircraft Factory started design of a night fighter development of its F.E.9, the F.E.12. This used the tailbooms, undercarriage and wing centre-sections of the F.E.9, combining them with new, three-bay outer wings and a larger tailplane. It was to be armed with a shell firing gun and equipped with two searchlights. The design was revised to produce the N.E.1 (for Night-flying Experimental), with revised wings, new tailbooms and a new, wide track, undercarriage.

The first prototype N.E.1 flew on 8 September 1917. It was fitted with a single searchlight in the nose, and with the pilot and gunner sat in tandem, with the pilot seated in front to give a good view. The gunner was to be armed with a 1.59-inch (40-mm) Breech-Loading Vickers Q.F. Gun, Mk II—widely known as the "Vickers-Crayford rocket gun," although it had no rocket-launching capability (Note: The Vickers-Crayford, although called the "rocket gun," was a lightweight single shot 40-mm gun that fired shells. It was officially known as the 1.59-inch Breech-Loading Vickers Q.F. Gun, Mk II.)—or a 1 1/2 lb COW gun, and a radio was fitted. It was powered by a 200 hp (149 kW) Hispano-Suiza 8 engine in a pusher configuration driving a four-bladed propeller. Its three-bay equal span wings were fitted with ailerons on both upper and lower wings, while the elevators had large horn balances (the amount of control surface forward of the hinge).

The first prototype crashed on 14 September 1917, and was rebuilt with a new nacelle with the searchlight removed, and the gunner, who was armed with a 1.59-inch (40-mm) Breech-Loading Vickers Q.F. Gun, Mk II, moved ahead of the pilot. A fixed Lewis gun was mounted externally on the starboard side of the fuselage, to be operated by the pilot. It flew in this form on 4 October 1917.

Although testing indicated that the N.E.1 was easy to fly and land, and had excellent field of fire for the gunner, the official test report noted "It is doubtful if the performance of this machine is good enough to make it suitable as a night fighter". Despite this, all six prototypes were completed, with the second prototype being sent to No. 78 Squadron, while several of the other aircraft were used for trials.

== Operators ==
United Kingdom

- Royal Flying Corps
  - No. 78 Squadron RFC

== Specifications ==
Data from British Aeroplanes 1914-18

General characteristics

- Crew: Two
- Length: 28 ft 6 in (8.69 m) (Note: Without searchlight - 30 ft 2 in (9.19 m) (9.20 m) with searchlight.)
- Wingspan: 47 ft 10 in (14.58 m)
- Height: 9 ft 8 in (2.95 m)
- Wing area: 555.1 sq ft (51.57 m^{2})
- Empty weight: 2,071 lb (939 kg)
- Gross weight: 2,946 lb (1,336 kg)
- Fuel capacity: 40 imp gal (48 US gal; 180 L)
- Powerplant: 1 × Hispano-Suiza 8 water-cooled V8 engine, 200 hp (150 kW)

Performance

- Maximum speed: 95 mph (153 km/h, 83 kn) at 10,000 ft (3,000 m)
- Endurance: 2 hr 45 min
- Service ceiling: 17,500 ft (5,300 m) (service ceiling) (Note: Absolute ceiling: 19,000 ft (5,800 m).)
- Time to altitude:
  - 9 min to 5,000 ft (1,500 m)
  - 22 min to 10,000 ft (3,000 m)
  - 81 min 25 s to 18,000 ft (5,500 m)

Armament

- Guns:
  - 1× 1.59-inch (40 mm) Breech-Loading Vickers Q.F. Gun, Mk II
  - 1× .303 in Lewis gun

== See also ==
Related development

- Royal Aircraft Factory F.E.9
- Royal Aircraft Factory A.E.3

Aircraft of comparable role, configuration, and era

- Vickers F.B.25
