= Vickers F.B.19 =

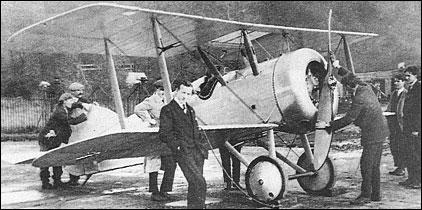

General information
- Type: Single-seat scout
- Manufacturer: Vickers
- Designer: George Challenger
- Primary users: Royal Flying Corps Russia/USSR
- Number built: 62

History
- Introduction date: 1916
- First flight: August 1916

The Vickers F.B.19 was a British single-seat fighting scout of the First World War, developed from the Barnwell Bullet prototype, and sometimes known as the Vickers Bullet. It served with the Royal Flying Corps and the Imperial Russian Air Service, which subsequently led to the Red Air Force adopting it during the Russian Civil War.

== Design and development ==
George Challenger designed the F.B.19, which first flew in August 1916. It was a single-engine, single-bay, equal-span biplane, slightly smaller than either the Sopwith Camel or Nieuport 17, with a proportionally large engine fairing and tall fuselage, which gave it a relatively stubby appearance. It was armed with one synchronised 7.7mm Vickers machine gun, mounted unusually on the left-hand side of the fuselage, to facilitate the installation of the Vickers-Challenger synchroniser gear.

The 100-hp Gnome Monosoupape engine gave a relatively slow speed, and the relatively low cockpit position, placed behind a wide rotary engine and between unstaggered wings, severely limited visibility for the pilot. The clearest view was sometimes said to be upwards, through a transparent section in the upper wing. Modifications were introduced, including a more powerful 110-hp (82-kW) Le Rhône or Clerget engine and staggered mainplanes, culminating in the Mk II design. The plane's relative success on the Eastern Front appears to have been due in part to it receiving a more powerful engine in Russia.

== Operational history ==
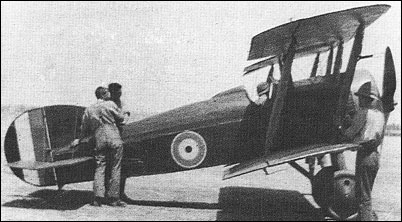
Vickers F.B.19 side view

Around sixty-five F.B.19s were built. Six early production examples were sent to France in late 1916 for operational evaluation, where the RAF found them unsuitable for the fighting conditions then evolving. Twelve Mk IIs went to the Middle East, five to Palestine and seven to Macedonia; no squadron was fully equipped with the type. They were not popular - pilots found visibility poor. A few Mk IIs served as trainers and for air defense over London, but the type had effectively been retired before the end of 1917.

The F.B.19 found more favour in Russia, where it was known as the Vikkers Bullit. A single example was initially sent for evaluation in 1916. Leading pilots, including the ace Yevgraph Kruten, regarded it favourably. Russian sources indicate that it was fitted with a more powerful 130-hp Clerget engine that provided a maximum speed of around 200 km/h (120 mph) making the Bullit faster than both the SPAD S.VII and the Sikorsky S-20. The Russians procured around twenty or thirty of them and deployed at least four to front-line units, including one in which the ace Grigoriy Suk claimed two of his victories. A number of unarmed aircraft served as trainers.

After the October Revolution, a number of Bullits found their way into Bolshevik hands. A force of six F.B.19s are said to have been employed in 1918 against the anti-Bolshevik People's Army, and the type remained in service until 1924. All examples of the F.B.19s in Russian service appear to have been Mk. Is with unstaggered wings. A number of additional examples are said to have remained in crates on the dockside at Arkhangelsk until the Royal Navy destroyed them during the evacuation of the allied expeditionary force in 1919.

== Variants ==
- F.B.19 Mk I: Single-seat fighter-scout biplane, powered by a 100 hp (75 kW) Gnome Monosoupape or a 110 hp (82 kW) Le Rhône 9J Rotary engine.
- F.B.19 Mk II: Single-seat fighter-scout biplane, powered by a 110 hp (82 kW) Clerget 9Z or a 110 hp (82 kW) Le Rhône 9J rotary engine.

== Operators ==
Russian Empire

- Imperial Russian Air Service

Soviet Russia

- Soviet Air Forces

Ukrainian People's Republic

- Ukrainian People's Republic Air Fleet

United Kingdom

- Royal Flying Corps
  - No. 14 Squadron RFC
  - No. 17 Squadron RAC
  - No. 30 Squadron RFC
  - No. 47 Squadron RFC
  - No. 111 Squadron RFC
  - No. 141 Squadron RFC

== Specifications (F.B.19) ==
Data from British Aeroplanes 1914–18

General characteristics

- Crew: 1
- Length: 18 ft 2 in (5.54 m)
- Wingspan: 24 ft 0 in (7.32 m)
- Height: 8 ft 3 in (2.51 m)
- Wing area: 215 sq ft (20.0 m^{2})
- Empty weight: 900 lb (408 kg)
- Gross weight: 1,485 lb (674 kg)
- Powerplant: 1 × Gnome Monosoupape rotary engine, 100 hp (75 kW)

Performance

- Maximum speed: 102 mph (164 km/h, 89 kn) at 10,000 ft (3,000 m)
- Endurance: 2 hr 45 min
- Service ceiling: 17,500 ft (5,300 m) (absolute)
- Time to altitude: 14 min to 10,000 ft (3,000 m)

Armament

- Guns: 1 × 0.303-in Vickers machine gun

== Citations and references ==
Citations

References

- Andrews, C. F., and E. B. Morgan. Vickers Aircraft since 1908. London:Putnam, 1988. ISBN 0-85177-815-1.
- Bruce, J. M. War Planes Of The First World War: Volume Three Fighters. London: Macdonald, 1969. ISBN 0-356-01490-8.
- Bruce, J. M. British Aeroplanes 1914–18. London:Putnam, 1957.
