= Blériot XXI =

Type XXI
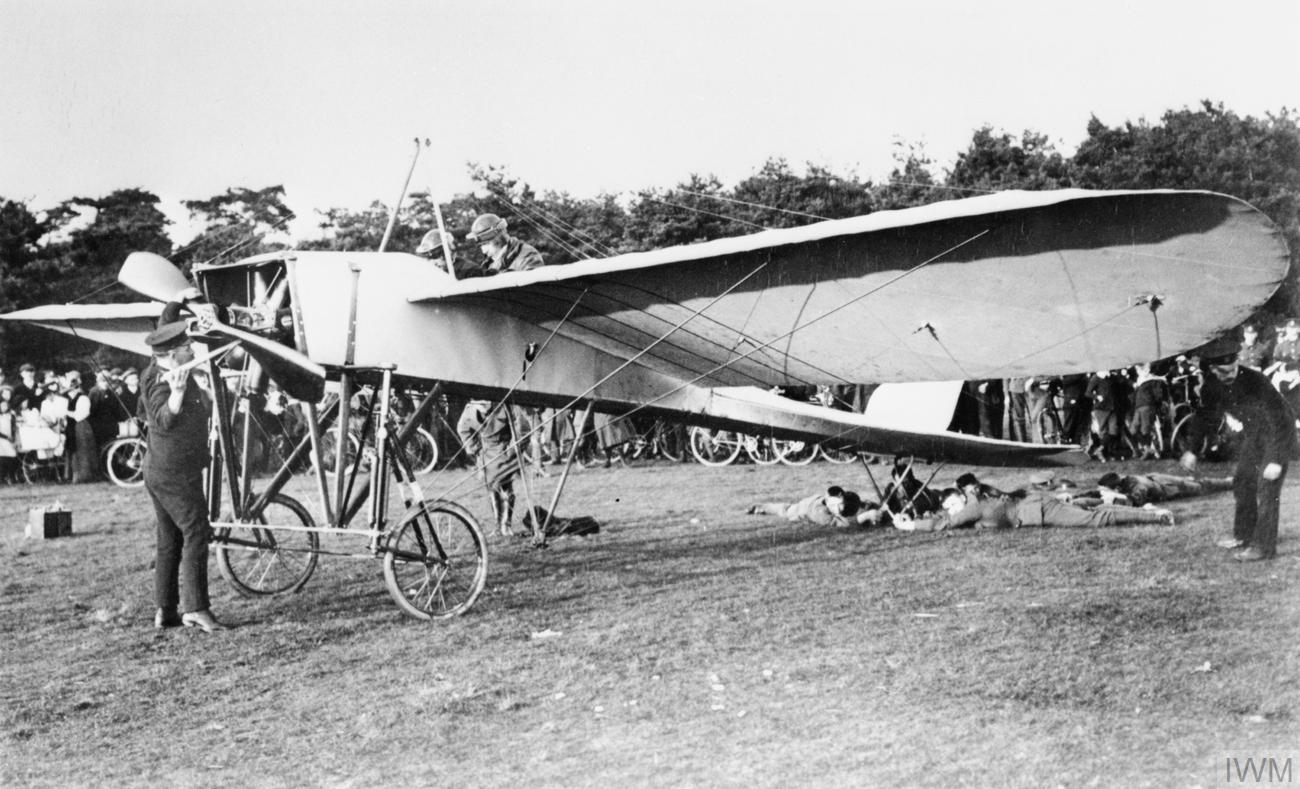

General information
- Type: Reconnaissance aircraft
- National origin: France
- Manufacturer: Blériot Aéronautique

History
- First flight: February 1911
- Developed from: Blériot XI-2 and Blériot XIV

The Blériot XXI was an early French aircraft built by Blériot Aéronautique.

== Design ==
The aircraft was a shoulder-wing monoplane powered by a 52 kW (70 hp) Gnome Gamma 7-cylinder rotary engine driving a two-bladed propeller. The pilot and passenger were seated in side-by-side configuration: the control column was centrally mounted and there were two sets of rudder pedals, so that it could be flown from either seat. The shallow section rectangular fuselage tapered to a horizontal knife-edge at the tail, with the elongated triangular horizontal stabiliser mounted in the middle, its covering blending into that of the upper and lower fuselage surface. A semi-elliptical elevator was mounted on the trailing edge, and a triangular balanced rudder was mounted above the rear fuselage. Lateral control was effected by wing-warping, the wires leading to a single inverted V-strut cabane above the fuselage and a similar V strut beneath. Petrol was stored in three tanks: a pair of gravity tanks were located under the top decking in front of the cockpit, pressure-fed from a larger tank under the seats.

The undercarriage was a variant of the well-proved pattern used on the Blériot XI, with the wheels mounted on a trailing arm free to slide up and down and sprung by bungee cords. Unlike that of the Blériot XI, the main vertical members terminated in a crossbar below the fuselage rather than one attached to the upper longerons, and it was also braced by a pair of diagonal struts either side, the front pair leading to the front of the upper longerons and forming the front of the raked engine cowling. The tailskid was made of two U-shaped pieces of rattan cane.

A Type XXI was one of the two Blériot designs entered for the 1912 British Military Aeroplane Competition.

== Specifications ==
Data from

General characteristics

- Crew: 1 pilot, 1 observer
- Length: 8.31 m (27 ft 3 in)
- Wingspan: 11.15 m (36 ft 7 in)
- Wing area: 29 m^{2} (310 sq ft)
- Empty weight: 389 kg (857 lb) 1481
- Gross weight: 599 kg (1,320 lb)
- Fuel capacity: 90 L (24 imp. gal) Oil capacity 30 L (7.75 imp. gal)
- Powerplant: × Gnome Gamma 7-cylinder rotary piston engine, 52 kW (70 hp)

Performance

- Maximum speed: 94.8 km/h (58.9 mph, 51.2 kn)
- Stall speed: 64 km/h (40 mph, 35 kn)
- Range: 406 km (252 mi, 219 nmi)
- Time to altitude: 4 min 15 sec to 305 m (1000 ft)
