= Short S.45 =

Training biplane built for Britain's Royal Navy

S.45

General information
- Other name: Short T.5
- Type: Seaplane trainer
- National origin: United Kingdom
- Manufacturer: Short Brothers
- Primary user: Royal Navy
- Number built: 4

History
- First flight: 24 May 1912
- Developed from: Short S.36

The Short S.45 — also known as the Short T.5 after its naval serial number — was a training biplane built for Britain's Royal Navy by Short Brothers in 1912. It was the forerunner of another three identical aircraft (designated S.48, S.49, and S.50 by Shorts) delivered to the Royal Navy and Royal Flying Corps during 1912 and 1913. The Royal Naval Air Service was still operating the type when World War I broke out in 1914.

== Design and development ==
The design was similar to that of the Short S.36, a sporting biplane built for Frank McClean which he lent to the Navy Flying School, Eastchurch. Cdr Charles Rumney Samson and Capt Eugene Gerrard test-flew the aircraft early in 1912. The pleasing performance of the S.36 led to an order by the Admiralty for two aircraft of similar configuration, but differed in the engine fitted. in March that year. Shorts delivered these as the S.41 and the S.45.

The S.45 was an unequal-span two-bay biplane with a fuselage of square-cross section with the two seats in tandem in open cockpits . The wire-braced wings were unstaggered, and the fuselage was mounted partway between them. Ailerons were fitted only to the upper wing. The tail was cruciform in shape and the undercarriage was designed to be interchangeable to allow the S.45 to be flown as a seaplane or landplane. The machine was powered by a single rotary engine in the nose, turning a two-blade propeller. In seaplane configuration, the undercarriage consisted of a single broad pontoon mounted beneath the fuselage, with airbags on short struts under each wing. A third airbag was later fitted under the tail to keep it out of the water while the aircraft was under tow.

== Operational history ==
The S.45 flew for the first time on 24 May 1912 as a landplane with Lt Spencer Grey at the controls, and was accepted for Navy service with the serial number T.5 ("T" signifying "tractor"). Together with the S.41, the aircraft participated in the Naval Review at Portsmouth in July. It was soon joined in service by the S.48 (serial 413), which Capt Gerrard delivered to the Central Flying School at Upavon on 10 October. Although evaluated by Capt John Salmond as underpowered, it flew regularly until damaged beyond repair in a landing accident on 3 December when it stalled on approach.

Meanwhile, the S.45 underwent considerable modification, including a new engine cowling, a built-up coaming around the cockpits, revised ailerons, and upper wings of greater span. The wing extensions were braced with a kingpost and wires. Its serial was changed from "T.5" to simply "5" when army and navy aircraft serials were merged into one system in late 1912. In 1913, the S.45 was stationed at Carlingnose, near Rosyth, where it suffered a landing accident and capsized on 4 October.

At the start of 1913, the Central Flying School received two further examples of the type: Capt Gerrard delivered the S.50 (serial 424) on 17 February and the S.49 (serial 423) on 22 February. Not long after, these aircraft disappeared from the records when their serial numbers were reassigned to two Royal Aircraft Factory B.E.8s. Eventually, stripped of their engines and identities, the War Office declared the two airframes to be surplus to requirements, and transferred them to the Admiralty in August 1914. In Royal Naval Air Service hands, the aircraft were re-engined with 100-hp (75-kW) Clerget rotary engines and assigned serial numbers 1268 and 1279. The RNAS operated them at the Navy Flying School and they remained in service at the outbreak of World War I.

== Operators ==
United Kingdom

- Royal Flying Corps
- Royal Naval Air Service

== Specifications (S.45) ==
Data from Jane's All The World's Aircraft 1913, p.55 and Barnes & James 1989, p.87

General characteristics

- Crew: two, pilot and instructor
- Length: 35 ft 6 in (10.82 m)
- Wingspan: 42 ft 0 in (12.80 m)
- Wing area: 450 sq ft (42 m^{2})
- Empty weight: 1,080 lb (490 kg)
- Gross weight: 1,500 lb (680 kg)
- Powerplant: 1 × Gnome Gamma 7-cylinder rotary engine, 70 hp (52 kW)

Performance

- Maximum speed: 60 mph (97 km/h, 52 kn)
- Endurance: 5 hr
