= Epsilon class blimp =

British airship

The Epsilon class blimp was a proposed British airship designed for the British Army in the 1910s.

When the Army abandoned involvement in British airship development, the Royal Navy (RN) took over the Epsilon I and Epsilon II airships on order, which were re-designated HMA No.21 and HMA No.22, but both were cancelled before completion.
