= Jacksonville National Cemetery =

Veterans cemetery in Duval County, Florida

- Interactive map of Jacksonville National Cemetery

Details
- Established: 2009
- Location: Jacksonville, Florida
- Country: United States
- Coordinates: 30°32′41″N 81°43′10″W
- Type: United States National Cemetery
- Owned by: U.S. Department of Veterans Affairs
- Size: 526 acres (213 ha)
- No. of graves: 19,000+
- Website: Official
- Find a Grave: Jacksonville National Cemetery

Jacksonville National Cemetery is a United States National Cemetery located within the city of Jacksonville, Florida, in the city's Northside area. It encompasses 526 acres (213 ha), and began interments on January 7, 2009.

== History ==
The relatively close St. Augustine National Cemetery was closed to interments in the 1990s, so the nearest location was the Florida National Cemetery in Bushnell, 143 miles from Jacksonville.

== Site status ==
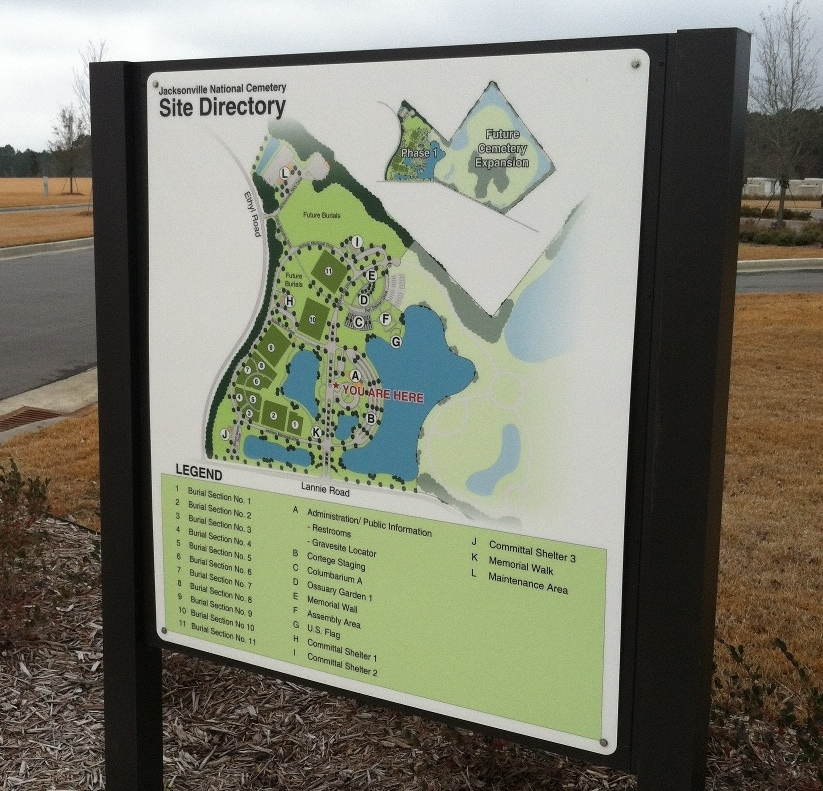

Initial construction began in August, 2008 and created a 20-acre (8.1 ha) burial area with temporary facilities. Stage 1A was completed in December, 2008, and the grounds were consecrated January 5, 2009. The second construction stage is scheduled to commence in the summer of 2009 and include an entrance, roadways within the 52-acre (21 ha) section, permanent buildings for administration and maintenance, a public information center and two shelters for services during inclement weather. Infrastructure consisting of drainage, fencing, landscaping, irrigation and utilities is also being built. The section under development will provide 8,145 gravesites, including 7,300 pre-placed crypts, 5,100 in-ground cremation sites and 4,992 columbarium niches.

In May 2011, the cemetery contained the remains of over 1,000 veterans, having been open for 28 months. As of August 2019, the cemetery contained over 16,000 memorials. As of August 2022, the cemetery had over 22,500 interments. September 2025, the cemetery has 28,500 interments.

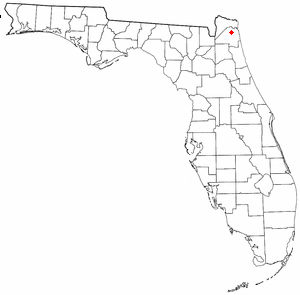
Location of cemetery in Florida

== Notable interments ==
- Jack D. Hunter, author, including the bestseller, The Blue Max (1964), which became a 1966 movie. Hunter served as an Army counterintelligence officer during and after World War II.
