= Zeppelin (film) =

- Theatrical poster
- Directed by: Etienne Périer
- Screenplay by: Donald Churchill; Arthur Rowe
- Story by: Owen Crump
- Produced by: Owen Crump
- Starring: Michael York; Elke Sommer; Peter Carsten
- Cinematography: Alan Hume
- Edited by: John Shirley
- Music by: Roy Budd
- Distributed by: Warner Bros.
- Release date: 6 October 1971
- Running time: 100 minutes
- Country: United Kingdom
- Language: English
- Budget: $3 million or $1.8 million

Zeppelin is a 1971 British World War I action–drama directed by Étienne Périer in Panavision and Technicolor. The film stars Michael York, Elke Sommer and Anton Diffring. Zeppelin depicts a fictitious attempt to raid Britain in a German Zeppelin to steal the Magna Carta from its hiding place in one of Scotland's castles or destroy it.

== Plot ==
During the First World War, British Army Lieutenant Geoffrey Richter-Douglas, a Scotsman of German descent, is attracted to Stephanie, a German spy who suggests he escape to Germany to be reunited with his family and friends. When he reports this conversation to his commanding officer, Captain Whitney, he is asked to go through with the defection to Germany, as part of a secret mission to steal the plans of the LZ36, a new type of Zeppelin under development at Friedrichshafen.

Geoffrey deserts to Friedrichshafen with a convincing gunshot in the arm from a British sailor for verisimilitude. He meets long-time friend Professor Altschul, who is working on the new airship with his beautiful and much younger wife, Erika, also a scientist. Erika keeps her suspicions of Geoffrey to herself.

Geoffrey learns that German Intelligence arranged his defection for a specific military purpose and Intelligence Colonel Hirsch assigns him to the LZ36 on its maiden test flight. Without returning to base, the airship is dispatched on a secret military operation to steal or destroy British historical documents including a copy of the Magna Carta from the National Archives at Balcoven Castle in Scotland. Geoffrey's knowledge of the Scottish countryside is key to guiding the airship to the castle at night. The Zeppelin travels to a fjord in Norway to refuel and embark specially trained soldiers armed with mustard gas.

Geoffrey surreptitiously transmits the LZ36's location to British intelligence, but when a German wireless operator hears the reply transmission, the two fight. Geoffrey knocks him out, throws him out a window and convinces the captain he fell scraping ice off the airship. Erika removes an important radio component and prevents further transmission before the airship departs for Balcoven Castle.

Under cover of darkness, Geoffrey navigates the airship on a final approach to the castle. A local farmer hears the sound of the airship's engines just before they are cut and alerts the local military, who are slow to believe him. Geoffrey is forced to participate in the assault but slips away to try to raise the alarm and persuades a skeptical radio operator to contact London. After being wounded by German soldiers, the dying operator mistakes Geoffrey for a German spy and shoots him in the arm. The Germans attack the castle and find the historical documents are sealed in strong vaults. The British Admiralty scrambles several Royal Naval Air Service squadrons and dispatches ground troops to respond. The responding British troops force the Germans to withdraw empty-handed, unwilling to risk losing the Zeppelin. The airship slips away in the dark but is caught by pursuing British aircraft shortly after first light. Several aircraft are shot down in the ensuing dogfight, but the Zeppelin is badly damaged.

Despite desperately lightening the airship in an effort to stay afloat, the Zeppelin crash-lands near the coast of the neutral Netherlands. Geoffrey, Erika and the few remaining crew members make their way ashore as the Zeppelin explodes.

== Cast ==
- Michael York as Geoffrey Richter-Douglas (Gottfried von Richter)
- Elke Sommer as Erika Altschul
- Peter Carsten as Major Tauntler
- Marius Goring as Professor Christian Altschul
- Anton Diffring as Colonel Hirsch
- Andrew Keir as Von Gorian, the LZ36 commander
- Rupert Davies as Captain Whitney
- Alexandra Stewart as Stephanie
- William Marlowe as Anderson
- Richard Hurndall as Admiral Blinker Hall, Chief of Naval Intelligence
- Michael Robbins as Cockney Sergeant
- George Mikell as German Officer
- Clive Morton as Lord Delford
- Gary Waldhorn as Harlich
- Alan Rothwell as Brandner
- Ronald Adam as Prime Minister
- Frazer Hines as Radio Operator
- Ruth Kettlewell as Mrs Parker
- Ray Lonnen as Sergeant Grant
- Molly Peters as Bar maid in The Black Rupert (Uncredited)
- Robert Cawdron as Officer (Uncredited)
- John Levene as British soldier (Uncredited)

== Production ==
The larger of two Zeppelin models was featured in the hangar revelation scene.

Written by producer Owen Crump, the story of Zeppelin is set in mid-1915, during the First World War. The mission depicted is fictitious. Principal photography for the production began in late 1970.

J. Ronald Getty was an executive producer through his GMF Picture Corp. The movie was to be the first of a three-picture deal between GMF and Warner Bros. (The others were Not Yet a Hero and Charlie Olive.) Getty had earlier helped finance the films Flare Up and Honky.

Getty told the press he "was involved in many ways" during filming, including finding the film's technical adviser, seeking locations and casting. He said his father was "not too interested" about filmmaking. "He's got other things to worry about." Getty added:

If you give the people what they want they will respond. The knack is in picking the right property. We're not interested in making pornography. Nor do we want to deliver any messages. Too many filmmakers nowaways are trying to foist their own views of social and moral questions on the public. Audiences don't want that. They want entertainment.

Crump said MGM cancelled the film two weeks before production claiming it would cost $5 million. He found alternative financing and brought the film in for $1.8 million, he claims, by cutting down on his overhead.

Filming took place in Malta. Peter Carsten was injured shooting bayonet scenes in the film.

=== Aircraft ===
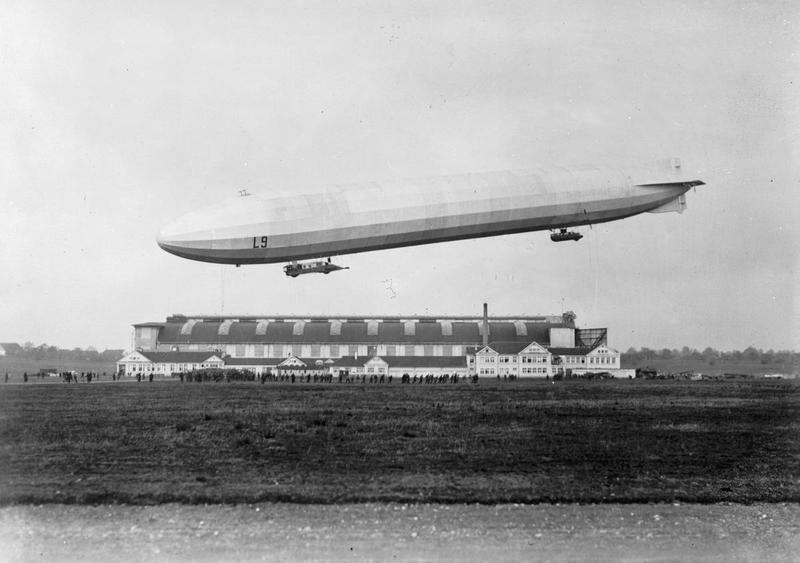
The real LZ 36/L 9 in 1915.

The airships seen in the film include a 37-and-18-foot (11.3 and 5.5 m) models based on the plans of the R33 class of British rigid airship, which was itself based on the German LZ 76, captured intact in September 1916. A replica of the control car was constructed for closeups and interiors, copied from the intact control car of the R33 held at the Royal Air Force Museum London; other interiors were built from plans held by the museum. (Note: Former Zeppelin Chief Engineer Dr. Friedrich Sturm was the film's technical coordinator, supervising the construction of the models and mock-ups, using original period drawings.)

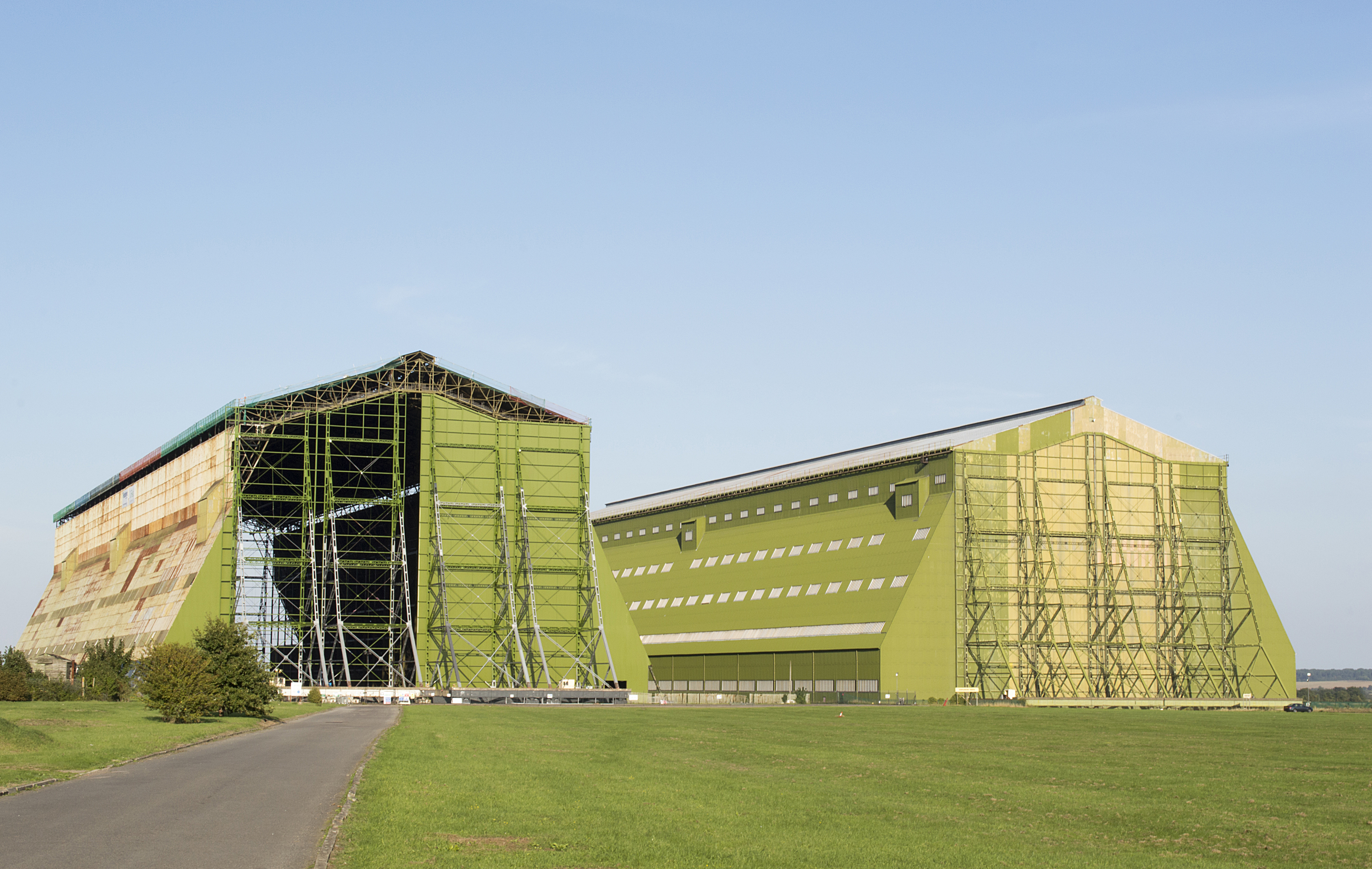
The historic airship sheds at RAF Cardington photographed in 2013.

Exterior shots using the model were filmed over a large water tank in Malta; scenes showing the sheds in which the Zeppelin was housed were filmed at the historic R100/R101 airship sheds at Cardington, Bedfordshire, in England. Photographs taken from the air to depict the fictional Glen Mattock and Balcoven Castle were shot over Carreg Cennen Castle in Wales.

=== Fatal accident ===
The air combat scenes were filmed using Lynn Garrison's collection of World War I replica aircraft, originally assembled for 20th Century Fox's The Blue Max (1966). During the aerial filming, on 18 August 1970 one of the S.E.5a replicas flown by Irish Air Corps pilot Jim Liddy, collided with the Alouette helicopter used as a camera platform. Five people were killed, including pilot Gilbert Chomat, aerial photographer Skeets Kelly and Burch Williams, brother of Hollywood producer/director Elmo Williams.

== Reception ==
Zeppelin was well received by the public, who viewed the Zeppelin airship as the real "star", but critical reaction was not positive. The review in Variety noted, "Zeppelin settles for being just another wartime melodrama, with some good aerial sequences and a powerful, brisk raid sequence in the finale." In his review, A. H. Weiler of The New York Times wrote, "... the storied, giant, silver, cigar-shaped dirigible is carrying a flimsy, lighter-than-air spy tale that wouldn't burden a carrier pigeon." The Los Angeles Times said it "should delight small boys of all ages."

Evening Standard thought it was "funny but not intentionally."

Crump announced plans for a second zeppelin film, Hellfire Over London to be shot in Czechoslovakia, but the film was never made.

== See also ==
- List of British films of 1971
