= Morane-Saulnier MS.230 =

Training aircraft family by Morane-Saulnier

MS.230
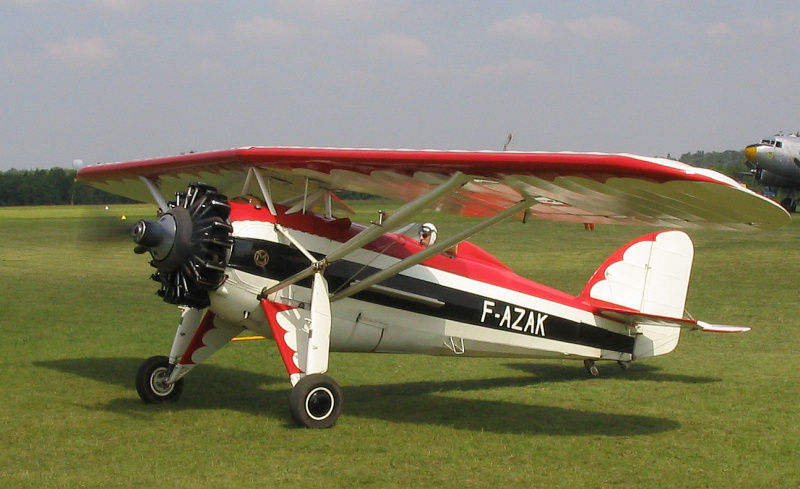

General information
- Type: Elementary Trainer
- Manufacturer: Morane-Saulnier
- Primary user: Armée de l'Air Flight School, Reims, France
- Number built: 1000+

History
- First flight: February 1929

The Morane-Saulnier MS.230 aircraft was the main elementary trainer for the French Armée de l'Air throughout the 1930s. Almost all French pilots flying for the Armée de l'Air at the outbreak of World War II had had their earliest flight training in this machine. It was the equivalent of the Stearman trainer in the United States air services and the de Havilland Tiger Moth in the British Royal Air Force.

== Development and design ==
The MS.230 was designed to meet French Air Ministry requirements. It was a parasol wing monoplane with a metal structure covered with fabric except for the forward fuselage, which was metal covered. The instructor and pupil occupied tandem cockpits. It had a wide-track fixed landing gear that made it very stable in takeoff and landing. The MS.230 differed from other trainers of the time, which were mostly biplanes.

It first flew in February 1929 and proved to be an excellent and stable machine which was very easy to fly. It saw service with military flight schools throughout France and was exported to the air forces of numerous other countries. It also became a popular aircraft for sporting aviation. An example won the Michelin Cup in 1929.

Numbers of MS.230s survived for many years after the war and became civilian trainers and civilian flying club aircraft. One was used in 1967 to act as camera-ship for air-to-air filming of Darling Lili at Baldonnel Aerodrome, Ireland. Examples are preserved on display in museums in Belgium, Czech Republic, France, Spain and the United States of America.

== Popular culture ==
A MS.230 was used at the end of the movie The Blue Max as the "new monoplane" in which Lt. Stachel is killed during a test flight.

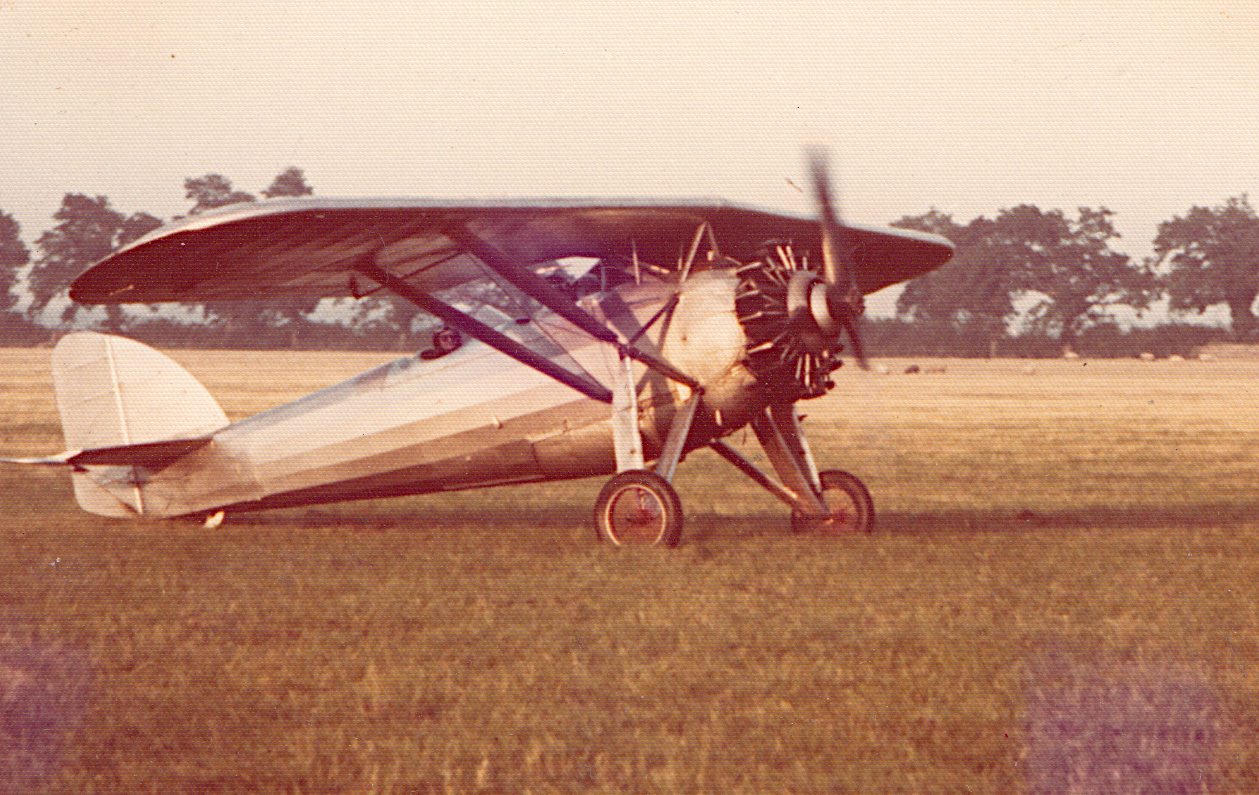
Lynn Garrison "Stachel" Morane MS-230 Weston, Ireland 1970

== Variants ==
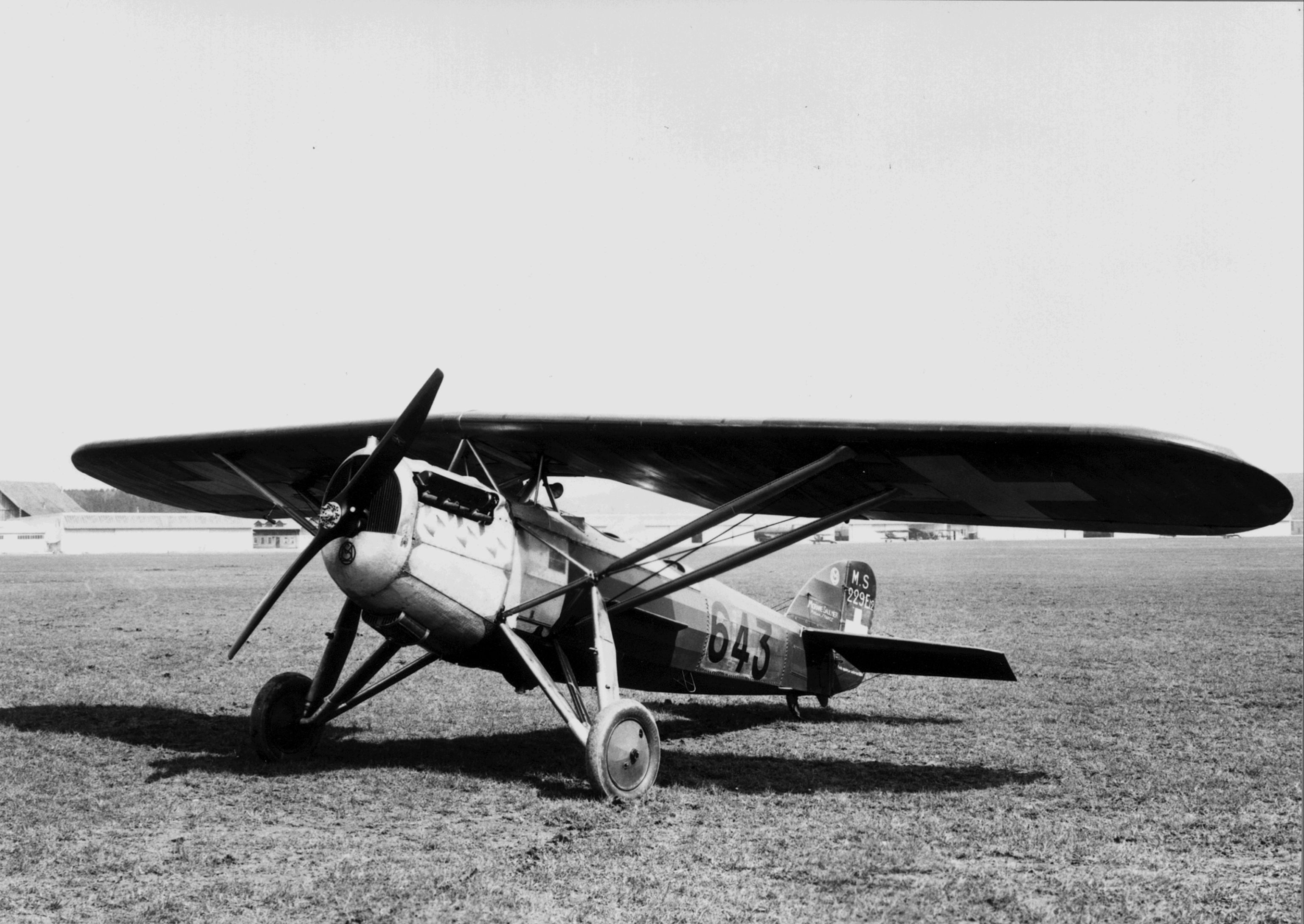
MS.229 built for the Swiss Army Air Service

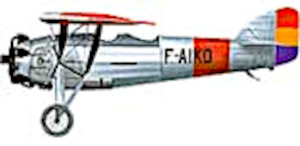
MS.230 of the Spanish Republican Air Force.

MS.229
Hispano-Suiza 8a V8, for the Schweizer Flieger- und Fliegerabwehrtruppen (Swiss Army Air Service); two built, one converted to Hispano-Suiza 9Qa radial in 1932.

MS.230
over 1,100 built; 20 bought by Romania and 25 by Greece in 1931, 9 each bought by Belgium and Brazil; main Armee de l'Air trainer for years; operated by several well-known private owners including Lynn Garrison and Louis Dolfus; some used for trials with Handley Page slats, or skis; one fitted with Lorraine 9Nb Algol Junior.

MS.231
six built, with 179 kW (240 hp) Lorraine 7Mb, 1930.

MS.232
experimental version with 149 kW (200 hp) Clerget 9Ca diesel, 1930.

MS.233
powered by 172 kW (230 hp) Gnome-Rhône 5Ba or Gnome-Rhône 5Bc, six built in France and 16 in Portugal under licence for the Portuguese military.

MS.234
186 kW (250 hp) Hispano-Suiza 9Qa engine, two built, one for U.S. Ambassador in Paris.

MS.234/2
converted from MS.130 Coupe Michelin racer with 172 kW) (230 hp) Hispano 9Qb and NACA cowling, entered in 1931 Coupe Michelin air race, 86 kW (250 hp) Hispano-Suiza 9Qa engine. Fitted with a Hispano-Suiza 9Qa engine as MS.234 #2, flown in aerobatic competition by Michael Detroyat until 1938.

MS.235
224 kW (300 hp) Gnome-Rhône 7Kb engine, one built 1930.

MS.235H
twin-float version, first flown 1931.

MS.236
fitted with 160 kW (215 hp) Armstrong Siddeley Lynx IVC, 19 built under licence for Belgian Air Force by SABCA, first flown July 1932.

MS.237
209 kW (280 hp) Salmson 9Aba engine, five built for private users, introduced 1934.

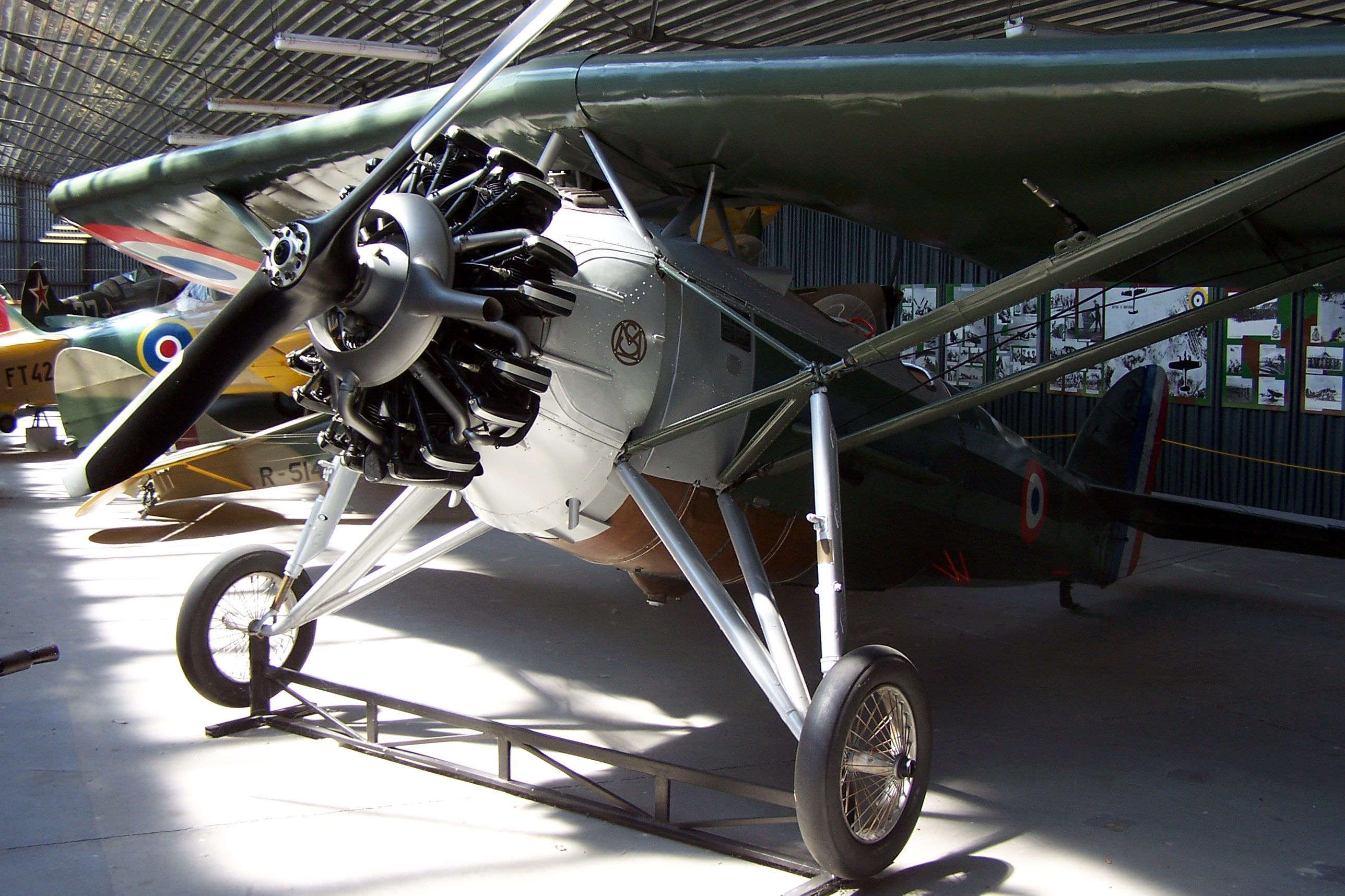
MS.230 at Prague-Kbely museum

.

== Operators ==
Belgium

- Belgian Air Force

Brazil

- Brazilian Air Force

Czechoslovakia

- Czechoslovak Air Force (as C23)

France

- French Air Force
- French Navy

Vichy France

- Vichy French Air Force

Germany

- Luftwaffe (small numbers)

Greece

- Hellenic Air Force

Portugal

- Portuguese Air Force

Kingdom of Romania

- Royal Romanian Air Force

Spanish Republic

- Spanish Republican Air Force

Switzerland

- Swiss Air Force

United States

- United States Army Air Corps

Venezuela

- Venezuelan Air Force

== Specifications ==
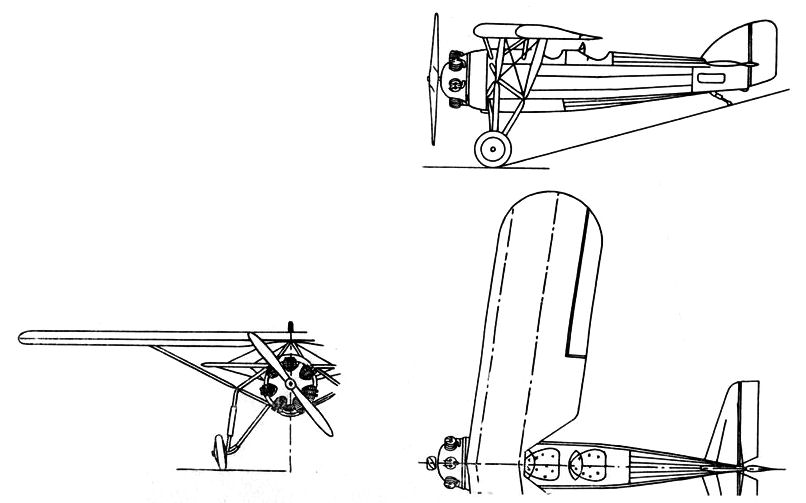
Morane Saulnier MS.230 3-view drawing from L'Aerophile Salon 1932

Data from Jane's All the World's Aircraft 1937, Jane's Vintage Aircraft Recognition Guide

General characteristics

- Crew: 2
- Length: 6.942 m (22 ft 9 in)
- Wingspan: 10.7 m (35 ft 1 in)
- Height: 2.73 m (8 ft 11 in)
- Wing area: 19.7 m^{2} (212 sq ft)
- Empty weight: 834 kg (1,839 lb)
- Gross weight: 1,208 kg (2,663 lb)
- Fuel capacity: 220 L (58 US gal; 48 imp gal) jettison-able fuselage tank with a 22 L (5.8 US gal; 4.8 imp gal) centre-section gravity tank
- Powerplant: 1 × Salmson 9AB 9-cylinder air-cooled radial piston engine, 170 kW (230 hp)
- Propellers: 2-bladed fixed-pitch wooden propeller

Performance

- Maximum speed: 207 km/h (129 mph, 112 kn) at sea level

193 km/h (120 mph; 104 kn) at 3,000 m (9,800 ft)
163 km/h (101 mph; 88 kn) at 5,000 m (16,000 ft)

- Cruise speed: 160 km/h (99 mph, 86 kn)
- Never exceed speed: 260 km/h (160 mph, 140 kn)
- Range: 579 km (360 mi, 313 nmi)
- Service ceiling: 5,000 m (16,000 ft)
- Time to altitude: 3,000 m (9,800 ft) in 11 minutes 18 seconds

5,000 m (16,000 ft) in 41 minutes 34 seconds

- Wing loading: 61.3 kg/m^{2} (12.6 lb/sq ft)
- Power/mass: 0.1429 kW/kg (0.0869 hp/lb)

== See also ==
Related lists

- List of Interwar military aircraft
- List of aircraft of the Spanish Republican Air Force

== Bibliography ==
- Mombeek, Eric (May 2001). "Les trésors de Cazaux" [The Treasures of Cazaux]. Avions: Toute l'Aéronautique et son histoire (in French) (98): 44–47. ISSN 1243-8650.
