= Caudron C.270 Luciole =

1930s French light aircraft

C.270 Luciole
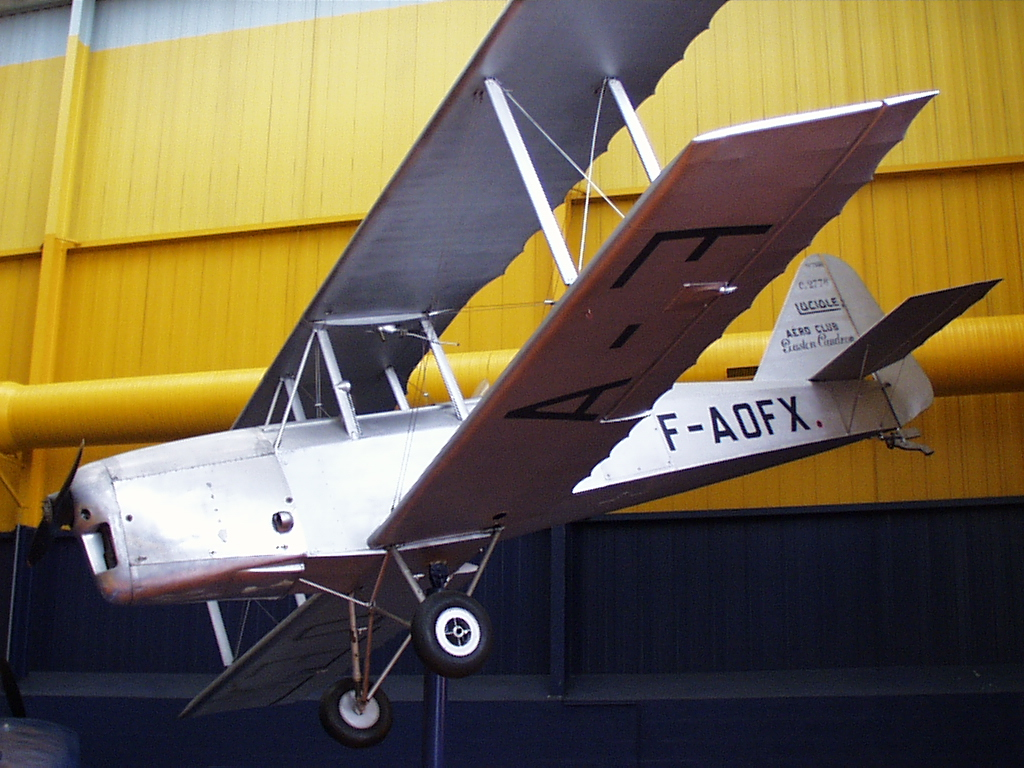

General information
- Type: Sports plane
- Manufacturer: Caudron
- Designer: Paul Deville
- Number built: >700

History
- First flight: 1931

The Caudron C.270 Luciole ("Firefly") was a sporting, touring and trainer aircraft produced in France in the 1930s, derived from the C.230.

== Design and construction ==
It was a conventional biplane with single-bay, unstaggered wings of equal span. The pilot and a single passenger sat in tandem open cockpits. It featured a fabric-covered fuselage in place of the C.230's wooden one, and other refinements including revised control surfaces and undercarriage, and an improved and simplified wing-folding mechanism.

== Operational history ==
The type proved immensely successful, with over 700 machines built in the decade leading up to World War II. Of these, 296 were purchased by the French government for its pilot training programme, the Aviation Populaire. Many examples saw wartime service as liaison aircraft, and those surviving the conflict saw postwar use as glider tugs in the Ecole de l'Air.

== On film ==
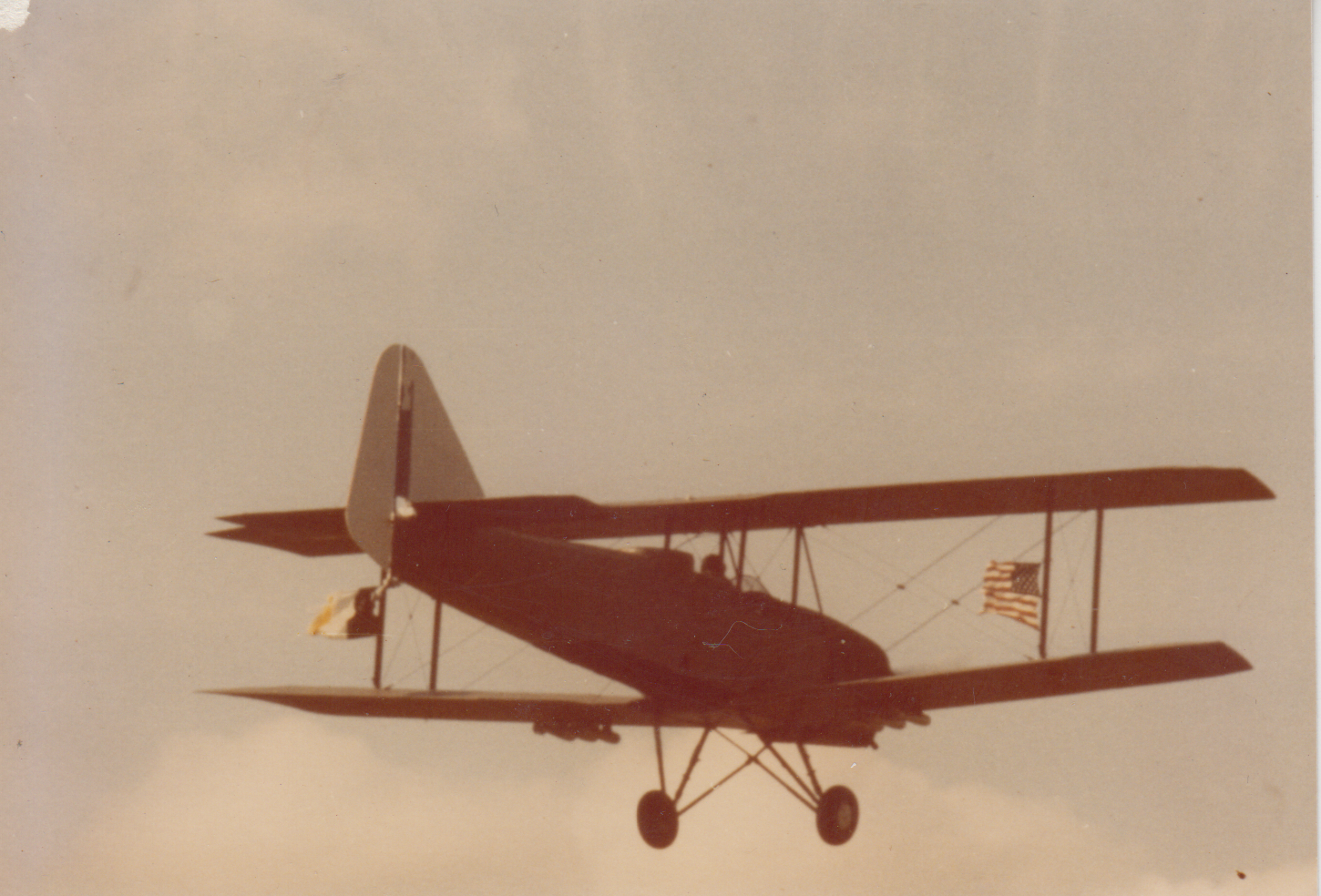
Lynn Garrison’s Caudron Luciole July 4, 1970, during Roger Corman production Von Richthofen and Brown with American and Irish flags to celebrate the day.

- 20th Century Fox used two Lucioles in their 1966 film The Blue Max. These had the rear seat converted into a machine-gun position so that they look like British observation planes. One of these survives on the American registry.
- United Artists used one Luciole for their film Von Richthofen and Brown (released in 1971).
- EMI Films used one Luciole for the 1976 film Aces High, this time reconverted to look like a British Avro 504.

== Variants ==
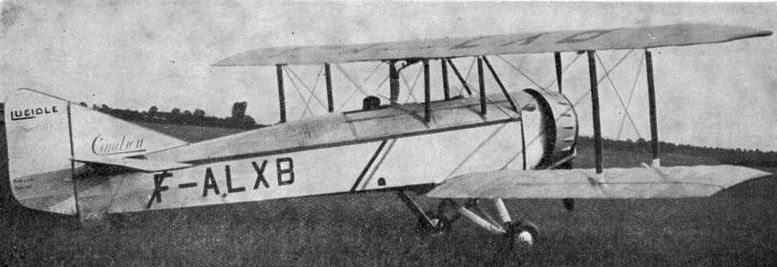
Caudron C.278 photo from L'Aérophile September 1932

- C.270 - first production version with Salmson 7Ac radial engine (82 built)
  - C.270/1 - version with Salmson 7Ac2 engine
- C.271 - version with Lorraine 5Pc engine (1 built)
  - C.271/2 - version with Lorraine 5Pb engine
- C.272 - version with Renault 4Pb inline engine (52 built)
  - C.272/2 - version with Renault 4Pci engine and taller, more pointed tail fin (22 built)
  - C.272/3 - version with Renault 4Pdi engine and wheel brakes (15 built)
  - C.272/4 - version with Renault 4Pei engine and wheel brakes (21 built)
  - C.272/5 - version with Renault 4Pgi engine (80 built)
- C.273 - version with Michel 4A-14 engine (14 built)
- C.274 - version with Chaise 4Ba engine for 1932 Paris Salon de l'Aéronautique (1 built)
- C.275 - main production version derived from C.272/5 but without wing folding (433 built)
- C.276 - version with de Havilland Gipsy III engine
  - C.276H - version with Hirth HM 504A-2 engine (2 re-engined from C.276)
- C.277 - similar to C.272/4 with non-folding wings (9 built)
  - C.272R - C.275 re-engined with Renault 4Po3 after the war (1 converted)
- C.278 - version with new undercarriage and Salmson 9Nc engine to compete in Challenge 1932 (1 built)

== Operators ==
France

- French Air Force

Spain

- Spanish Republican Air Force

== Specifications (C.272) ==
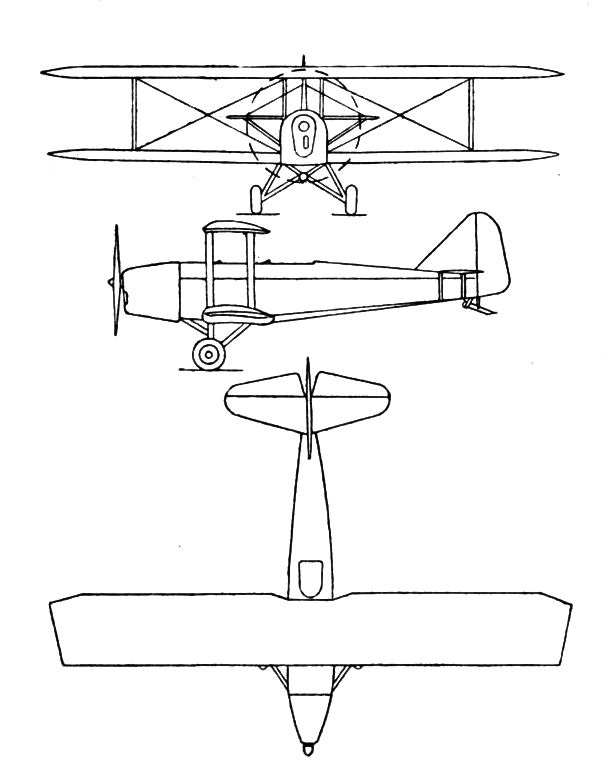
Caudron C.270 Luciole 3-vew drawing from L'Aérophile February 1938

General characteristics

- Crew: One pilot
- Capacity: 1 passenger
- Length: 7.67 m (25 ft 2 in)
- Wingspan: 9.90 m (32 ft 5 in)
- Height: 2.76 m (9 ft 1 in)
- Wing area: 24.0 m^{2} (258 sq ft)
- Empty weight: 516 kg (1,138 lb)
- Gross weight: 780 kg (1,720 lb)
- Powerplant: 1 × Renault 4Pb , 71 kW (95 hp)

Performance

- Maximum speed: 158 km/h (98 mph, 85 kn)
- Range: 500 km (311 mi, 270 nmi)
- Service ceiling: 4,000 m (13,120 ft)

== See also ==
Related lists

- List of Interwar military aircraft
- List of aircraft of the Spanish Republican Air Force

== Bibliography ==
- Bouhours, Bernard (November 2001). "Courrier des Lecteurs" [Readers' Letters]. Avions: Toute l'Aéronautique et son histoire (in French) (104): 2. ISSN 1243-8650.
- Taylor, Michael J. H. (1989). Jane's Encyclopedia of Aviation. London: Studio Editions. p. 240.
- World Aircraft Information Files. London: Bright Star Publishing. pp. File 891 Sheet 14.
