= Lynn Garrison =

Canadian pilot and political adviser (born 1937)

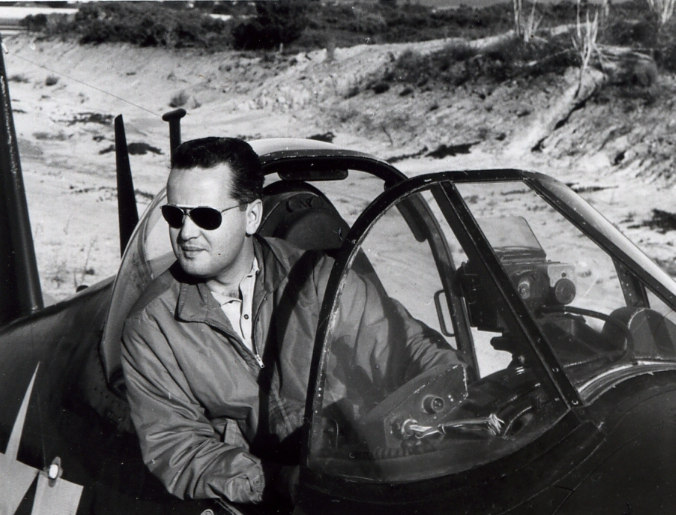
- Lynn Garrison in the cockpit of his Corsair N693M at the National Air Races in Reno, Nevada, 1966
- Born: April 1, 1937 (age 89)
- Relatives: Spouse: Carolle Tranchant 1994 -
- Military career
- Allegiance: Canada; Biafra; Haiti
- Branch: Royal Canadian Air Force; United Nations Emergency Force; Biafran Air Force
- Service years: 1954–1964
- Rank: Wing Commander
- Nickname: Shadow
- Unit: 403 City of Calgary Squadron
- Conflicts: Nigerian Civil War
- Awards: Paul Tissandier Diploma

Lynn Garrison (born April 1, 1937) is a Canadian pilot and political adviser. He was a Royal Canadian Air Force fighter pilot in the 403 City of Calgary Squadron, before holding jobs as a commercial pilot, film producer, director and mercenary. Garrison has also accumulated a substantial collection of classic aircraft, flying many of these as well as organising their restoration and preservation. He participated in the Nigerian Civil War as a mercenary, assisting the military of Biafra.

During the 1980s and 1990s, Garrison served in various political capacities, such as being an adviser to Haitian President Raoul Cédras and serving as Haitian Consul to the United States between 1992 and 2010. In his latter years, he has been increasingly active as an author as well as for various charitable concerns. With regard to flying, Garrison is known for his oft-repeated comment, "If it has fuel and noise, I can fly it."

== Military career ==
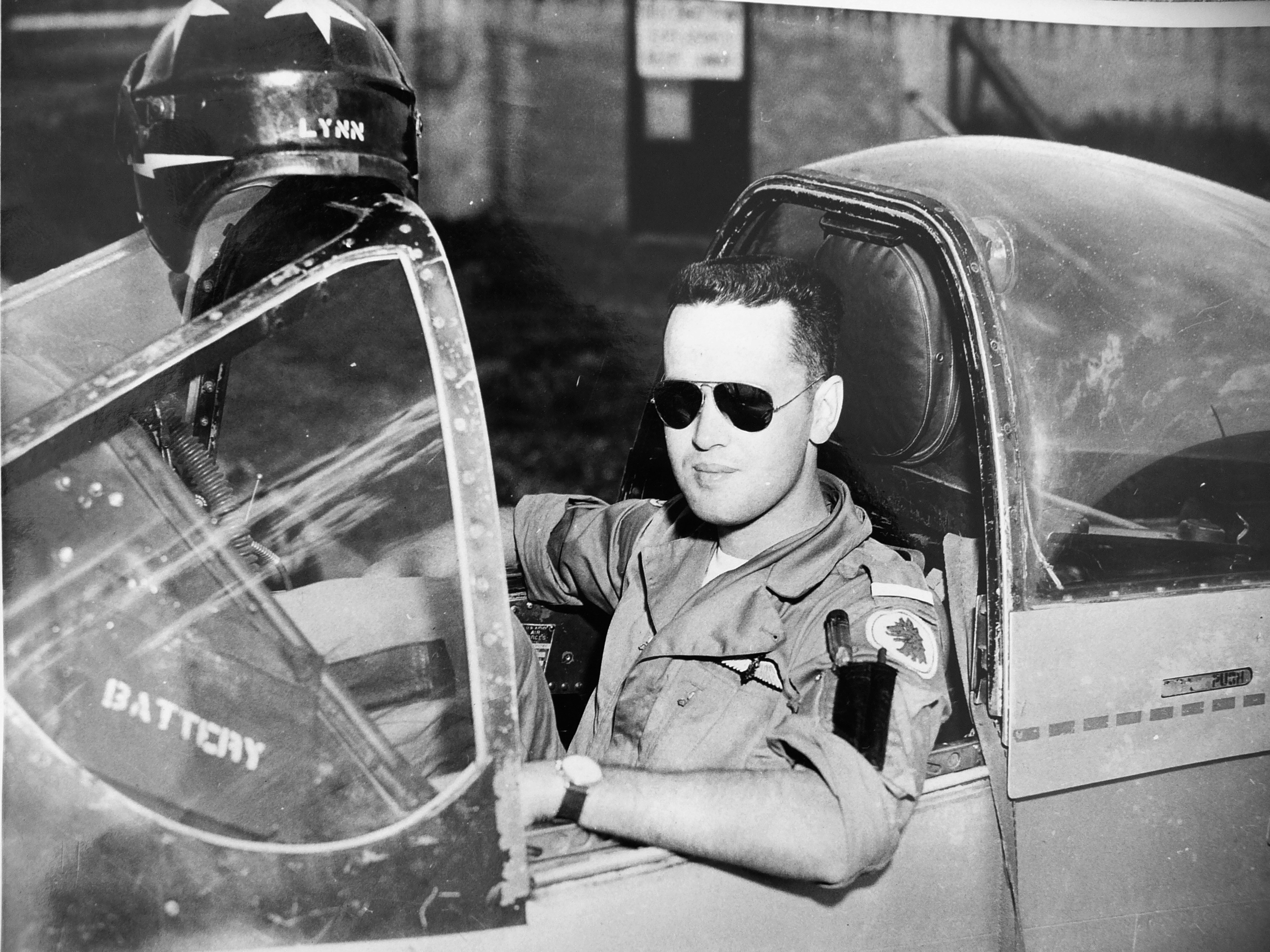
Garrison in cockpit of an RCAF Mustang, July 1956

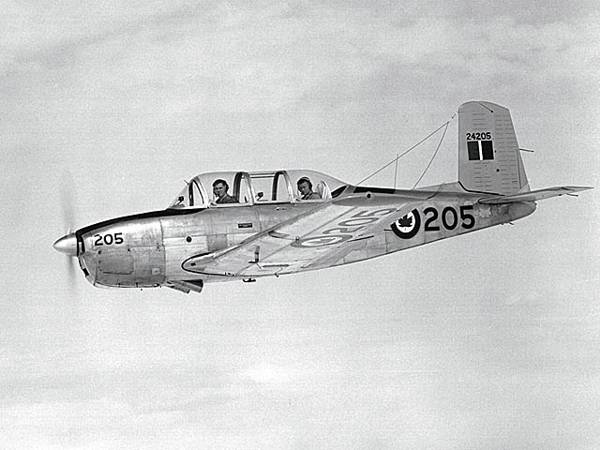
RCAF MENTOR 205 over RCAF Station Penhold, Alberta August 12, 1954

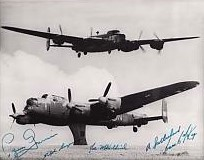
Lancaster KB-976, flown by Garrison, over FM-136, Calgary, Alberta on 4 July 1964

At the age of 17, Garrison joined the RCAF and trained at the RCAF Officer Selection Unit (Ontario) and Course 5411, 4 Flying Training School (RCAF Station Penhold, Alberta). During October 1954, the Beechcraft T-34 Mentor was introduced to RCAF service in a quest to find a replacement for the Harvard. Courses 5409 and 5411, at Penhold, were chosen as the test classes for the type. It was decided that the T-34 was too easy to fly and was dropped from the RCAF in February 1955. A total of 48 students participated in this experiment, including Garrison. After completing the course at Harvard he advanced to 2 Advanced Flying School (Portage la Prairie, Manitoba) for jet aircraft training in the Canadair CT-133 Silver Star. Garrison received his wings on 6 April 1955 making him the youngest "winged pilot" in the RCAF since World War II, a record that still stands. Garrison's wings were presented by Wing Commander Joe McCarthy DSO, DFC, CD, a Second World War veteran who was famous for attacking the Sorpe dam on the Dambuster's raid.

On 1 April 1957 Lieutenant Commander Derek Prout delivered an RCN Hawker Sea Fury WG-565 to Calgary for use as a ground instruction airframe at the Southern Alberta Institute of Technology. Garrison flew the aircraft making the last official Canadian military flight of the type. Prout lost his life in the crash of an F2H-3 Banshee at RCN Shearwater, Nova Scotia May 31, 1957.

RCN Sea Fury WG-565, McCall Field, Calgary, after last Canadian flight of type by Flying Officer Garrison 1 April 1957

In 1962, Garrison served with 115 Air Transport Unit of the United Nations Emergency Force (UNEF), on the Sinai Peninsula, where he flew de Havilland Otters and Caribous. While with 115 ATU he acted as Under-Secretary-General of the United Nations Dr. Ralph Bunche's pilot.

On August 2, 1962, RCAF Caribou 5320 from 115 ATU, UNEF, was attacked overhead El Arish airfield, on the Sinai, by two UAR Mig-17 type aircraft. The Caribou, captained by F/L Lynn Garrison with Wing Commander Hal Knight OC, 115 ATU, as co-pilot, was on a test flight when UAR controllers ordered it to land. A refusal saw two Migs launched. Maintaining a very tight turn, over the airfield, 5320 avoided the fighters and touched down, while still turning. General P.S. Gyani, UNEF commander, initiated an official protest over this incident, one of many.

On July 4, 1964, Garrison captained the RCAF's final flight of the Avro Lancaster with Flight Lieutenant Ralph Langemann as co-pilot. Specially authorized by Minister of National Defence, Paul Hellyer, the flight was complicated by the fact that Garrison had never flown a Lancaster and had broken his ankle the previous day. It displayed at the Calgary International Air Show, an event created and coordinated by Garrison. After the flight, Garrison purchased the aircraft, KB-976, which is now included in Kermit Weeks' Fantasy of Flight collection in Florida.

During 1965, Garrison, with authorisation from Paul Hellyer and the help of RCAF 121 Search & Rescue Unit, salvaged a Vought OS2U Kingfisher from Calvert Island, British Columbia, It had crashed there on a ferry to Alaska during World War II. The aircraft was brought to Calgary, then restored by the Vought Aeronautics 25 Year Club and donated by Garrison to the North Carolina Battleship Commission. It is now displayed on the stern of the USS North Carolina.

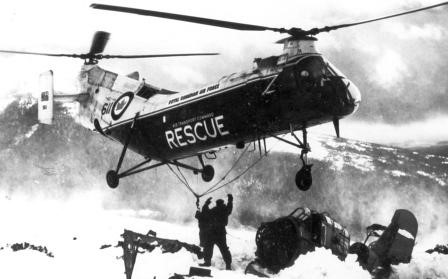
Lynn Garrison salvaged Vought Kingfisher from Calvert Island, British Columbia, February 1965

In his classic, Fighter Command Air Combat Claims, 1939–45 (1939–1940), John Foreman commented on the question of pilot temperament and ability. Foreman observed that Garrison had remarked, "In every squadron there were, perhaps, four or five pilots who exuded confidence. They knew that they were going out to shoot. The rest knew sub-consciously, that they would make up the numbers, mill about, and get shot at".

== Post-military career ==
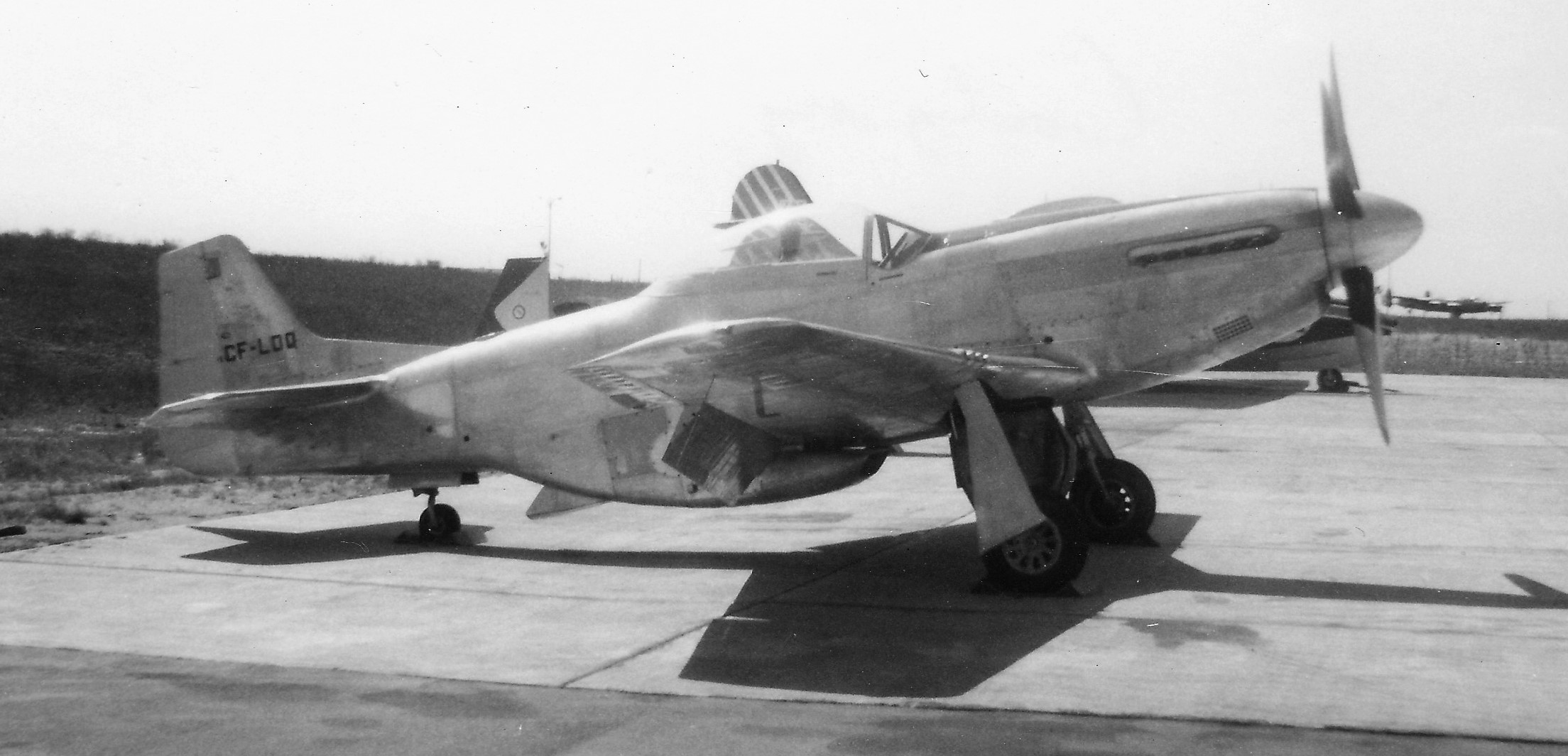
Garrison P-51D Mustang CF-LOQ at Calgary, July 1962

In 1960, Garrison obtained a contract to ferry 75 ex-RCAF P-51 Mustangs to new owners in New York. Milt Harradence took time off from his law practice to accompany Garrison on the trips. Flying mainly without radios, they navigated by following the Canadian Pacific Railway tracks eastward. Harradence and Garrison acquired two Mustangs as part of their compensation and registered them RCAF 9221 44-74435"CF-LOR" and RCAF 9223 44-74446 "CF-LOQ"; the first of their type registered in Canada.

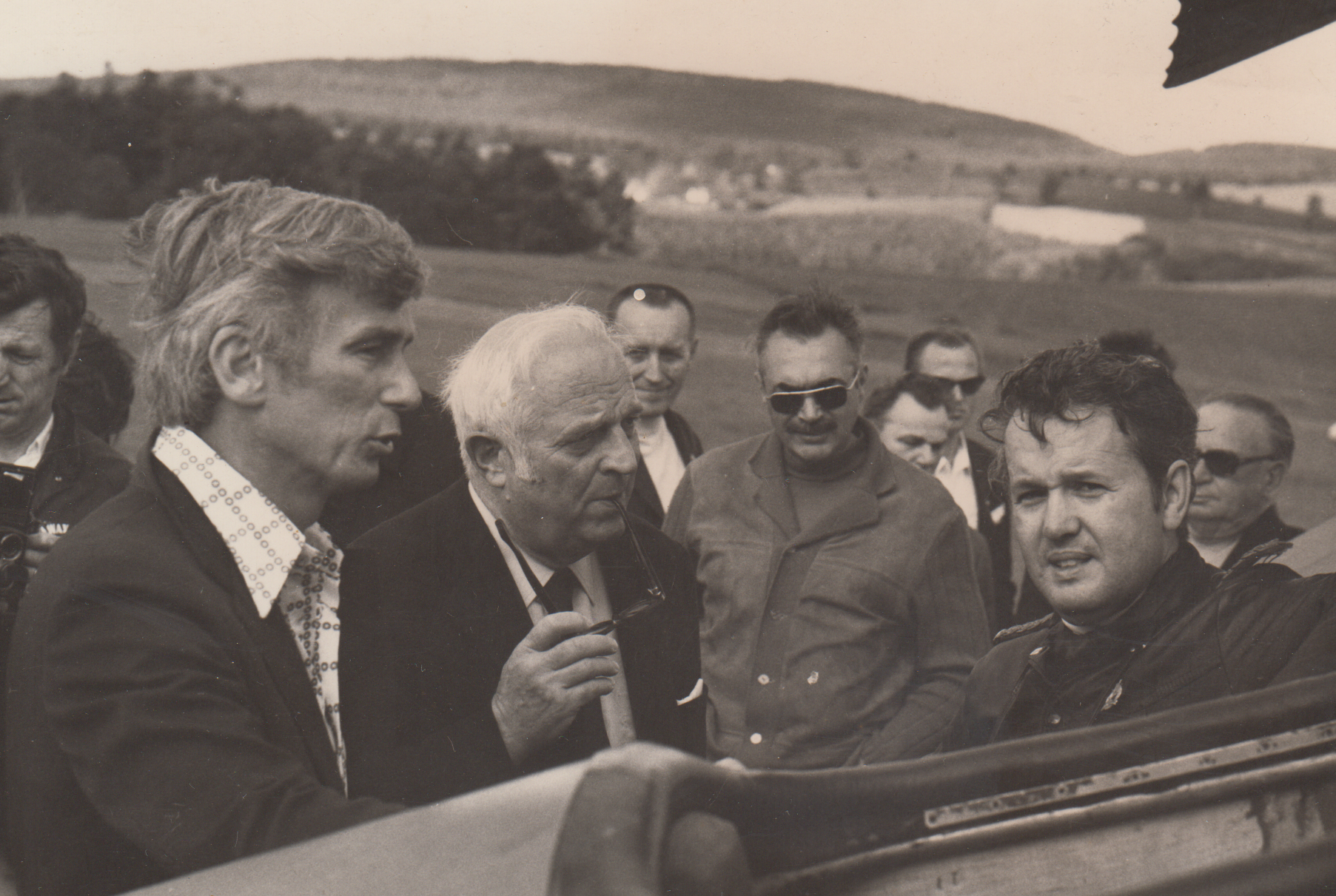
Garrison explains Triplane handling characteristics to Apollo 17s Gene Cernan at a committee for Federation Aeronautique Internationale conference, Dublin, Ireland, 1973

During 1961, while ferrying surplus RCAF Mustangs from the old BCATP airfield at Macleod, Alberta, Garrison spotted a number of Lancaster bombers slated for the melting pot. He purchased Lancaster FM-136 and created the Lancaster Memorial Fund to see the aircraft on permanent display in Calgary. His aircraft was without engines. The government loaned him 4 for the ferry flight to Calgary. Lancaster FM-136 was mounted on a concrete pedestal. The memorial was dedicated by Air Marshall Hugh Campbell, Chief of the Air Staff on April 12, 1962. FM-136 was later removed for display in Calgary's The Hangar Flight Museum. A number of Garrison's original collection formed the original basis for the museum and are displayed alongside FM-136.

During the 1960s, Irving P. Krick & Associates operated a cloud seeding operation in the area around Calgary, Alberta, using four Harvards to disperse silver iodide into the atmosphere in an attempt to reduce hail damage. For several years, Garrison, Ralph Langeman and Stan McLeod, all ex-members of the RCAF's 403 Squadron, spent their summers flying hail suppression. The Alberta Hail Suppression Project is continuing with C$3 million a year in funding from insurance companies to reduce hail damage in southern Alberta. In 1964, Garrison established the Air Museum of Canada. Prior to the creation of the Museum, Garrison had accumulated a personal collection of 45 classic aircraft including:

- Airspeed Oxford
- Avro Lancaster
- Avro Anson
- Avro Canada CF-100 Canuck
- Bristol Fairchild Bolingbroke
- Canadair F-86 Sabre
- Caudron Luciole
- Consolidated B-24 Liberator
- de Havilland Mosquito
- de Havilland Vampire
- de Havilland Tiger Moth
- de Havilland Canada DHC-1 Chipmunk
- Fairchild PT-19
- Fairey Battle
- Fleet Finch
- Fokker D.VII
- Fokker Dr.I
- Hawker Hurricane
- Lockheed T-33
- Morane-Saulnier MS.230
- North American B-25 Mitchell
- North American BT-9
- North American T-6 Texan
- North American P-51 Mustang
- Pfalz D.III
- Royal Aircraft Factory S.E.5
- Stampe-Vertongen SV.4
- Supermarine Spitfire
- Sikorsky H-5
- Vought F4U Corsair
- Vought OS2U Kingfisher
- Westland Lysander

Garrison became involved in air show promotion, to fund his aircraft museum project, with his Calgary International Air Show in 1963, 1964, 1965 and 1966. In 1967 he created the Los Angeles International Air Show which ran until 1969. Garrison was also involved in the Irish International Air Shows of 1970 and 1971 and the 1968 Las Vegas International Exposition of Flight with Danny Kaye. Kaye was Honorary Chairman of the show that utilized many facets of the city's entertainment industry while presenting an air show. Garrison was the operational show chairman.

In 1963, Garrison acquired a number of Hawker Hurricanes from farmyards in Alberta and Saskatchewan for his collection. He planned to create Canada's first flying aviation museum but could not generate interest. One of these now flies as G-HURI while Hurricane 5389 is now under the stewardship of the Calgary Mosquito Aircraft Society and is under restoration in Wetaskiwin, Alberta. During December 2013, Bonham's Auction House offered one of Garrison’ Hurricanes for sale, valuing it at between $2,000,000 and $3,000,000. In June 1964, Garrison purchased two Canadair Sabre Golden Hawks aircraft from the Government of Canada. One was sold to Russell O'Quinn's Flight Test Research in Long Beach, California. Canadair Sabre (American registry N186F), was converted to a QF-86E drone and crashed on recovery at White Sands, New Mexico on 17 May 1978.

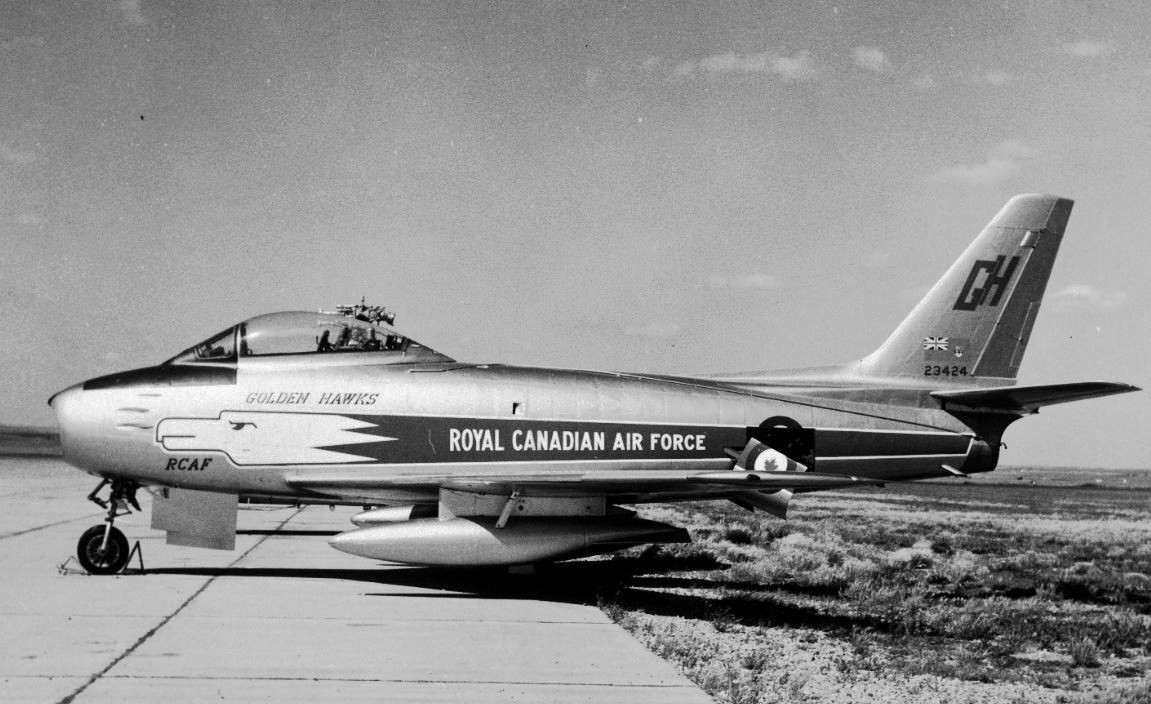
Ex-RCAF Golden Hawk Canadair F-86 23424 purchased by Lynn Garrison for his collection, July 1964

After 50 years in storage, on August 11, 2012, Garrison's ex-Spartan Air Services PR.35 Mosquito (RS700 CF-HMS) was transferred to the Bomber Command Museum in Nanton, Alberta, for restoration by the Calgary Mosquito Aircraft Society with half of the $1,650,000 funding provided by the City of Calgary.

Garrison relocated to Los Angeles during 1966 and incorporated the American Aerospace & Military Museum, Inc. with Walker Mahurin, Mira Slovak, Chuck Lyford and Mickey Thompson on the board. Mahurin obtained displays from the USAF, the first being a HGM-25A Titan 1 missile. Ed McMahon, a former Marine Corsair pilot, and Johnny Carson’s nightly TV sidekick, was involved with the project. As a result, Carson heard about the missile and used it in a joke, one night, commenting on “people who forgot luggage at motels, but here was a guy who forgot a Titan Missile!” The resulting uproar saw the USAF retrieve their property.

Between 1965 and 1969, Garrison was president of Craig Breedlove & Associates. Breedlove held the World Land Speed Record five times in 1965 with a top speed of over 601.1 miles per hour. During 1968, Garrison started a deal that saw Utah's Governor, Cal Rampton provide a hangar facility for the construction of a supersonic car. Bill Lear, of Learjet fame, was to provide support, along with his friend Art Linkletter. Playboy hoped to have the car painted black with a white bunny on the rudder. TRW was supplying a lunar lander rocket motor. However, the concept was shelved. The group also negotiated to use the late Donald Campbell's wheel-driven Bluebird CN7 record-breaker.

Garrison published the aviation magazine AVIAN from 1966 to 1969 with contributions from actor and pilot Richard Bach, Ernest Gann, Ray Bradbury and others. AVIAN started a tradition by including an aviation-oriented poem; the first issue featured "Planes that Land on Grass" by Ray Bradbury while the last issue, Vol, 2, No. 6 featured Garrison's Remembrance which has been used over the years by pilots’ groups such as Fighter Pilot University.

== Film projects ==
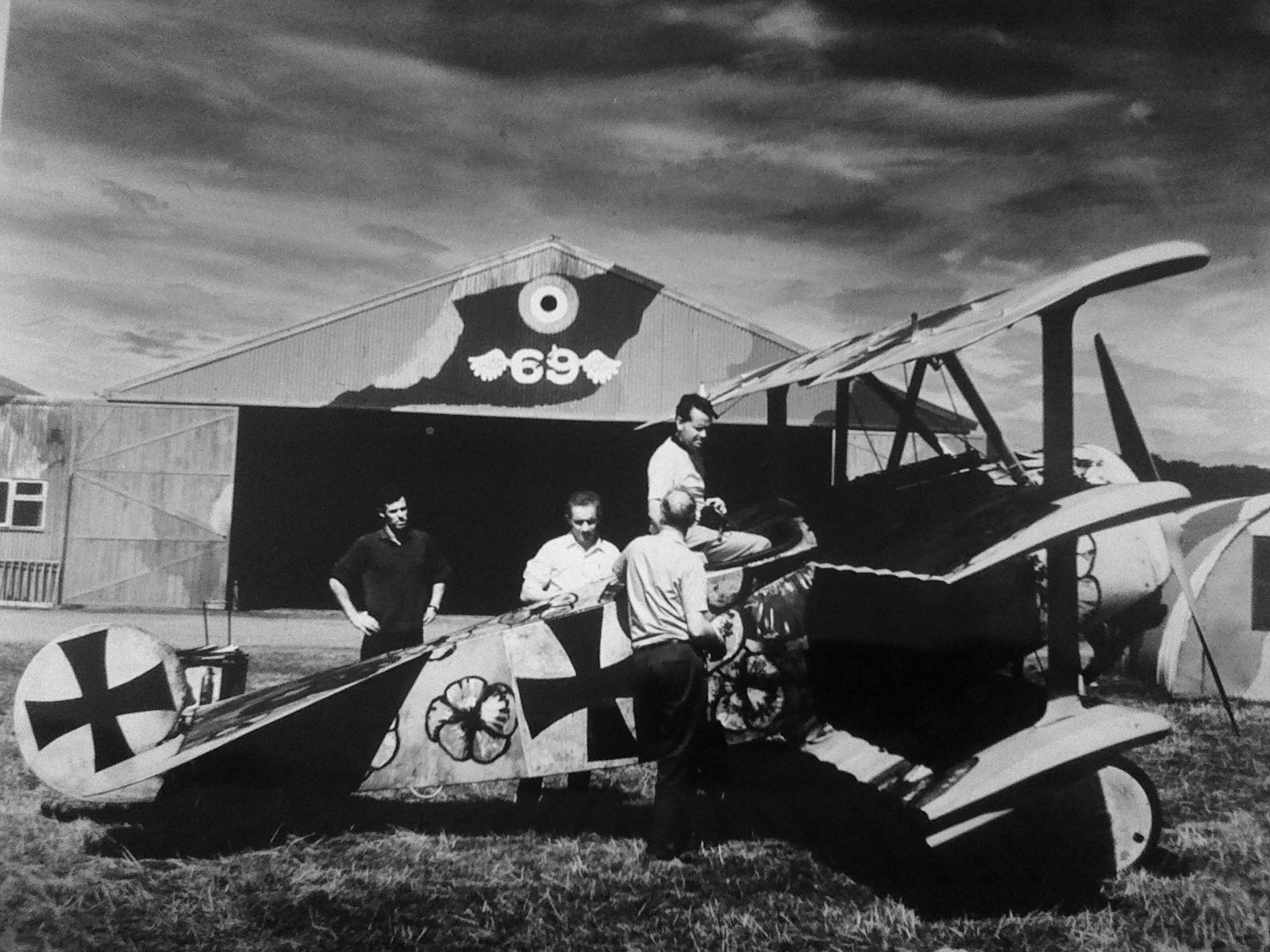
Bitz built Fokker Dr.1 replica EI-APW Lynn Garrison collection, Ireland

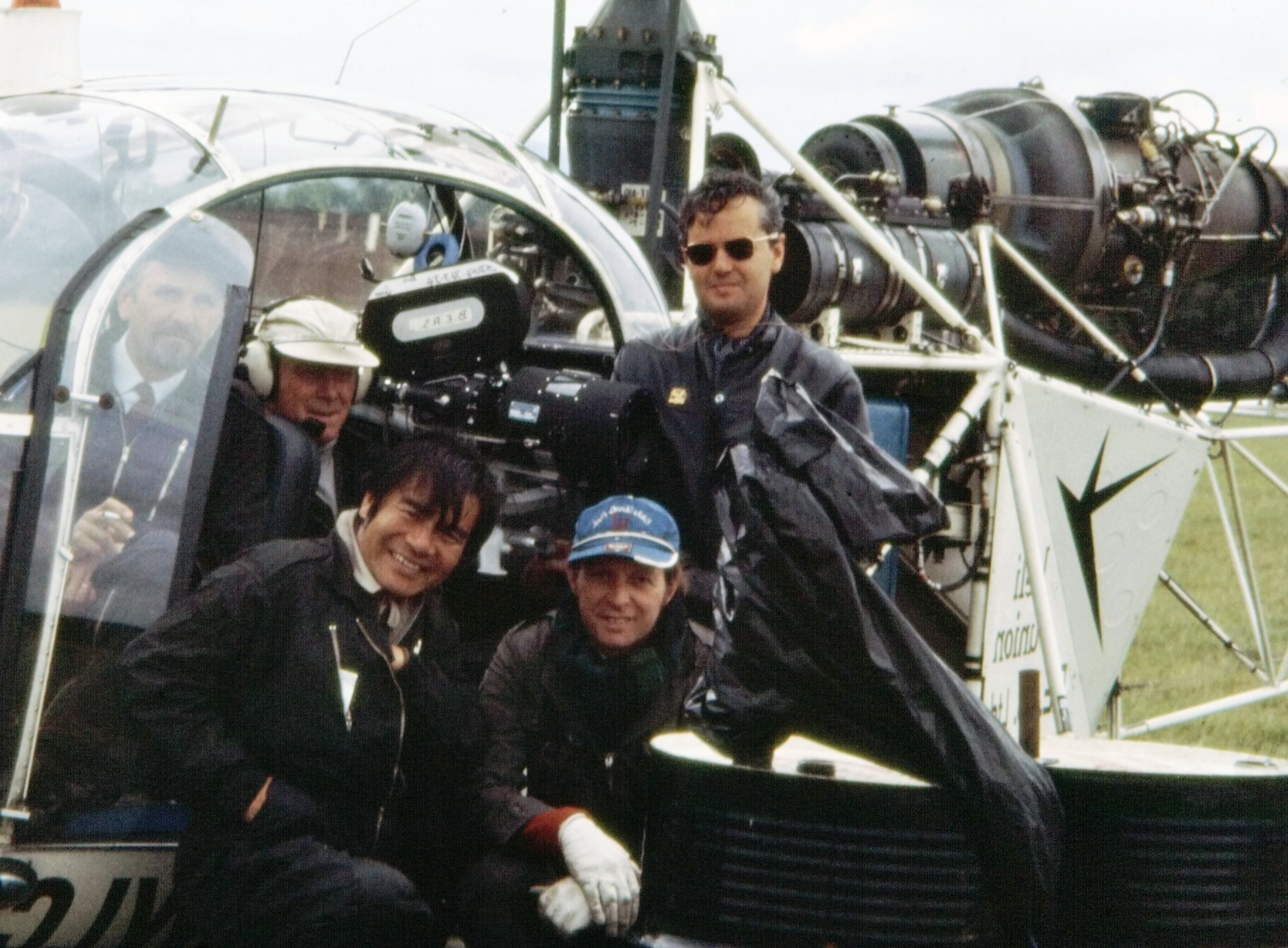
Camera crew from Richthofen & Brown. Peter Peckowski and Peter Allwork in cockpit of Aerospatiale SA 315B Lama. Jimmy Murakami, Shay Corcoran, Garrison

Between 1964 and 1965, Garrison worked with the Irish Air Corps to establish a collection of First World War replica aircraft and support equipment at Weston Aerodrome, Leixlip, Ireland. It was originally established for 20th Century Fox's 1966 film The Blue Max. The aerial fleet included a sole Caudron 277, two Fokker DR 1s, three Fokker D VIIs, two S.E.5As and two Pfalz D IIIs (all full-scale replicas) four de Havilland Tiger Moths, three SV4C Stampes, a Morane 230 and six Curry Wot 3/4 scale S.E.5As.Since no original Dr.1 exists Garrison’s Bitz Triplane SN 001 is the oldest example of its type in existence. Garrison owned 001 since 1965 and it is presently registered in America.

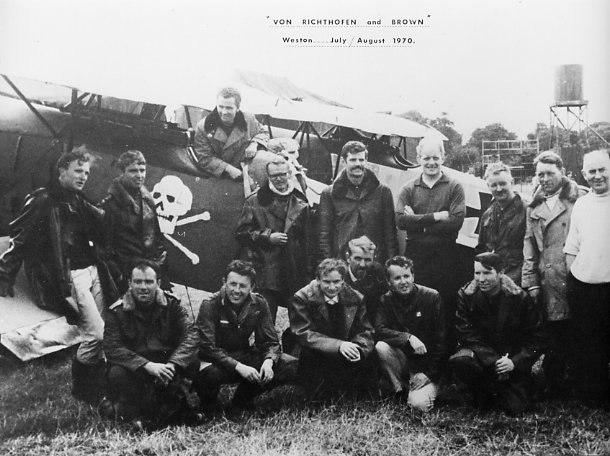
Irish Air Corps pilots filming Von Richthofen and Brown, 1970. Garrison is second from right, front row

During the September 1970 filming of Owen Crump's film, Zeppelin, Garrison's unit lost an Alouette helicopter and S.E.5 in a mid-air collision over County Wicklow, Ireland with a loss of five people including Burch Williams, brother of 20th Century Fox executive Elmo Williams. For the film Tora! Tora! Tora!, Garrison and Jack Canary created the large fleet of "Japanese" aircraft. Some of these aircraft still make appearances at air shows. Garrison also worked on Darling Lili, Barry Lyndon, Ryan's Daughter, and the TV series Twelve O'Clock High.

Garrison and Producer/Director Stanley Kubrick were both represented by Loeb & Loeb a worldwide entertainment law firm. Garrison coordinated the Irish end of Barry Lyndon and introduced an Irish folk group,The Chieftains to Kubrick. They did much of ‘Barry Lyndon’s’ sound track.

The Irish Film Act of 1980 provides tax advantages for film productions and resident foreign creative people. Len Deighton, Frederick Forsyth, and Richard Condon were among the many who took advantage of the allowances and lived in Ireland for a number of years. The Film Act of 1980 was the result of an initial 1970 collaboration between Ireland’s Prime Minister, the Taoiseach, Jack Lynch, and Garrison, who shared a semi-detached house with Lynch. The Film Act became the basis for other national film acts throughout Europe and America.

The summer of 1970 saw Garrison’s film unit supporting the Roger Corman production Von Richthofen and Brown Richard Bach travelled to Ireland and participated in the aerial sequences. On September 16 Charles Boddington was killed when his SE5 spun in during a low-level maneuver. The following day, during the final sequence, Garrison flew a Stampe with actor Don Stroud in the rear seat. The aircraft was set up with a rearward facing camera, mounted in front of Garrison, that shot Stroud in the rear seat "flying the aircraft". While flying at low-level across Lake Weston a large bird flew through the prop arc, striking Garrison in the face. Pulling up he hit 5 power lines and then plunged into the lake inverted. They were rescued by the film crew. Stroud was uninjured. Garrison required 60 stitches for a head wound.

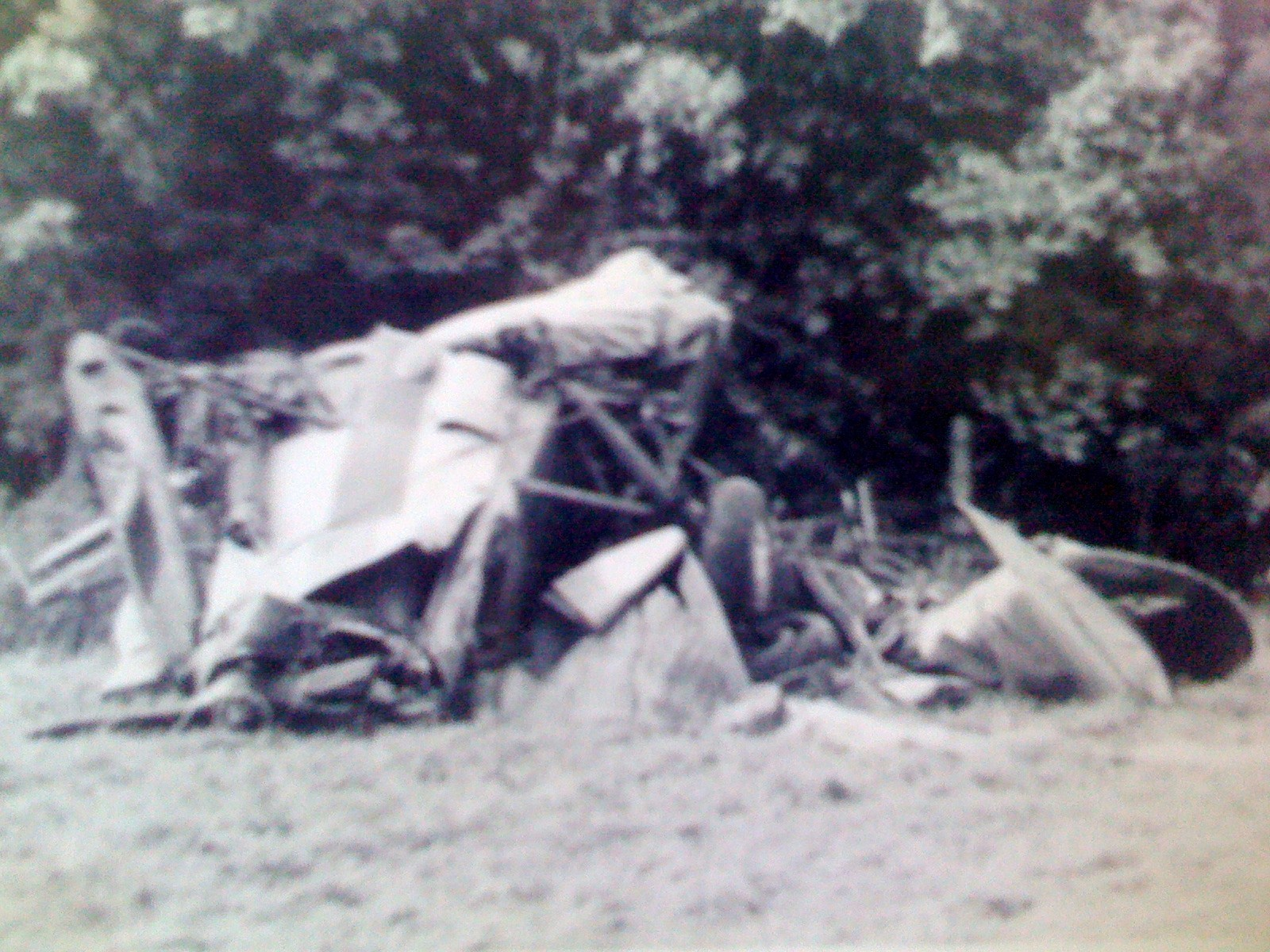
Lynn Garrison crash, September 16, 1970 SV4.C Stampe

Garrison assisted Lou Lenart on six feature films projects utilizing the Israel Air Force. He wrote the script for Lenart's final production, with the working title, First Strike, with Operation Opera, the June 7, 1981, attack on Iraq's reactor as the story line. Garrison was to serve as aerial director. Lenart led the first Israel Air Force strike on May 29, 1948, during Operation Pleshet.

== Mercenary activity ==
Garrison became a mercenary, flying as a combat pilot in various conflicts and later acting as a military and political advisor, allegedly with the support of several US Government agencies and U.S. senators. During the Nigerian Civil War (1967–1970), Garrison joined a group of mercenaries fighting for the breakaway state of Biafra.

Garrison was originally dispatched to Biafra to research ways to neutralize the Nigerian Navy frigate Nigeria, which was blockading Port Harcourt to disrupt petroleum exports. Discovering his expertise as a pilot, the Biafrans asked for Garrison to assist. On 20 August 1967, he flew one mission in an almost unserviceable B-26 against Kano airfield, destroying three Mig-17s. Then it was realised that light aircraft could operate as simple counter-insurgency aircraft platforms, gaining the support of Garrison's associates, James Baring and John Fairey, of the Barings Bank and Fairey Aviation Company families. Count Carl Gustav von Rosen initiated this concept, which finally saw action in May, 1969. Garrison's RCAF experience help him destroy numerous Soviet-supplied aircraft, such as a MiG-17 and IL-28 at Port Harcourt on 22 May 1969. Numerous such raids were conducted around this period.

Garrison introduced a Canadian method of dropping bagged supplies to remote areas in Canada without losing the contents. He showed how one sack of food could be placed inside a larger sack before the supply drop. When the package hit the ground the inner sack would rupture while the outer one kept the contents intact. With this method many tons of food were dropped to many Biafrans who would otherwise have died of starvation.

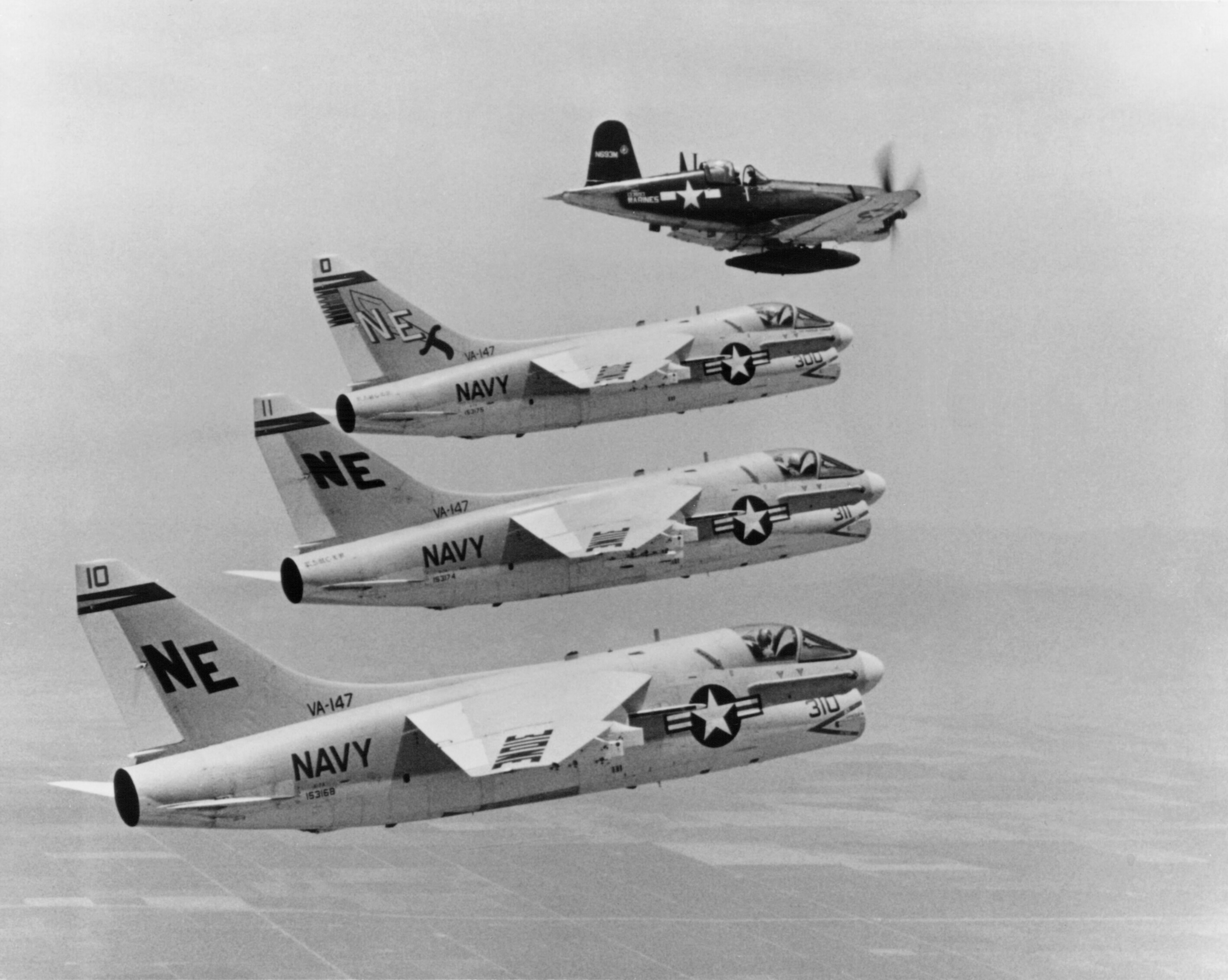
Lynn Garrison in his Vought F4U-7 Corsair leading LTV A-7A-4a-CV Corsair IIs of U.S. Navy Attack Squadron VA-147, on 7 July 1967

Operation Tiger Claw (17–20 October 1967) was a military conflict between Nigerian and Biafran military forces. On 17 October 1967 Nigerians invaded Calabar led by the "Black Scorpion", Benjamin Adekunle, while the Biafrans were led by Col. Ogbu Ogi, who was responsible for controlling the area between Calabar and Opobo, and Lynn Garrison, a foreign mercenary. The Biafrans came under immediate fire from the water and the air. For the next two days Biafran stations and military supplies were bombarded by the Nigerian Air Force. That same day Lynn Garrison reached Calabar but came under immediate fire by federal troops. By 20 October, Garrison's forces withdrew from the battle while Col. Ogi officially surrendered to Gen. Adekunle. On 19 May 1968 Port Harcourt was captured. With the capture of Enugu, Bonny, Calabar and Port Harcourt, the outside world was left in no doubt of the Federal supremacy in the war.

During 2017, an American intelligence study investigating light COIN aircraft contacted Garrison regarding the Biafran action. In response, Garrison provided details on his combat experiences in the conflict. Each year, on 30 May, the IPOB - Independent People of Biafra - hold the Biafran Annual Remembrance Day; Garrison's role has often been noted. The 2018 remembrance activities were marked by publication of articles, one entitled: "Biafra Fallen Heroes: The Heroic Deeds Of Lynn Garrison In Focus".

On July 14, 1969, territorial frictions between El Salvador and Honduras became the Football War. The preceding months had seen 12 Mustangs ferried into El Salvador by a team which included, Garrison and Chuck Lyford. Their associate, Archie Baldocchi, a Beechcraft dealer in El Salvador, Special Assistant to the Chief of the FAS, coordinated their acquisition. Garrison flew in the last military conflict involving propeller-driven fighters (P-51 Mustangs and the Vought F4U Corsairs) during the Football War.

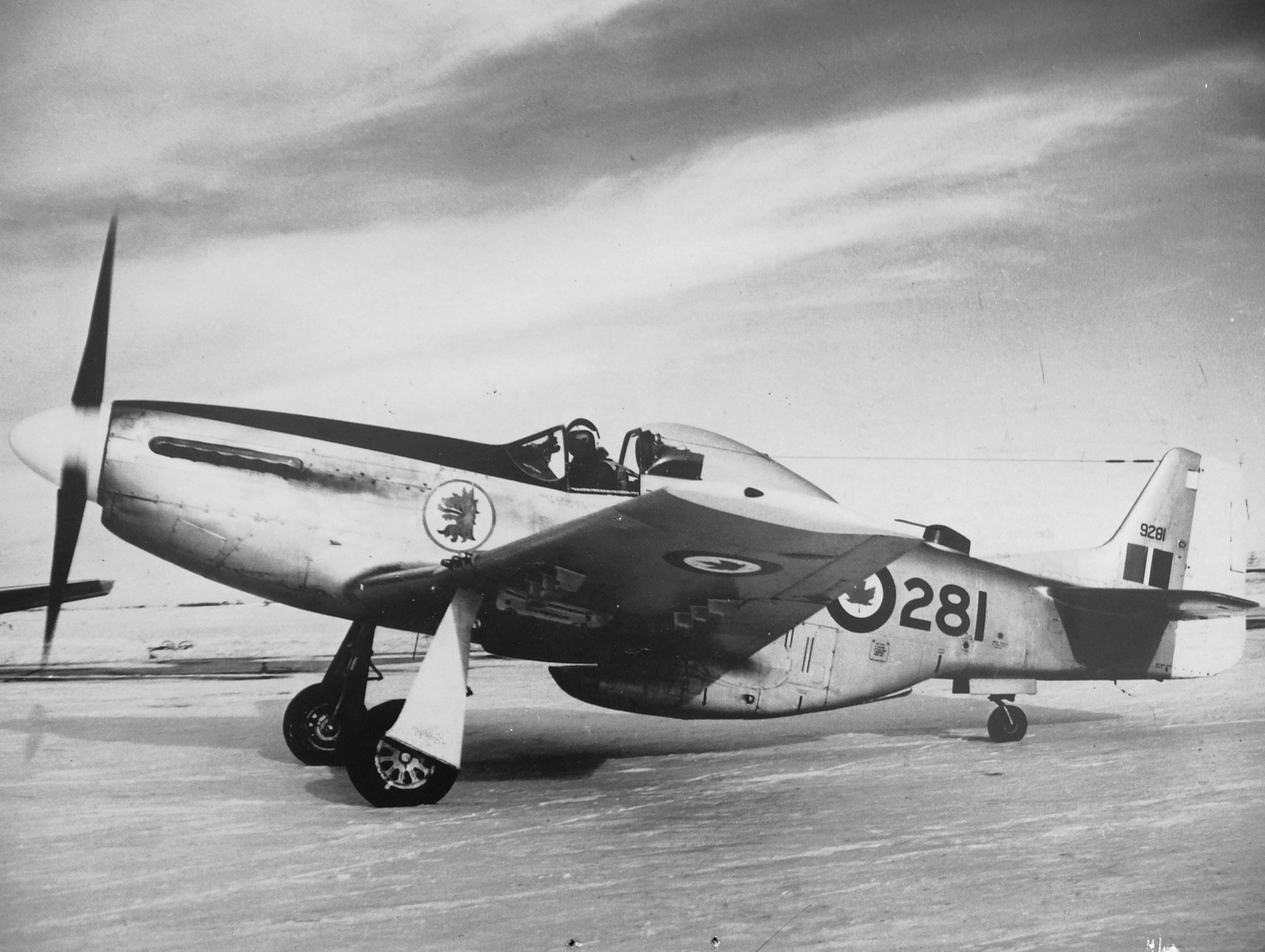
Garrison with RCAF 9281, 1956. It was flown in the US as "Cottonmouth" and used in the 1969 Football War

Garrison had owned an ex-French Navy Corsair 133693 which had operated in Vietnam and during the 1956 Suez Crisis, having bought it after its retirement from French service, it was transported to California for him with help from the U.S. Navy. During July 1967, Garrison was photographed over NAS Lemoore in formation with Corsairs of VA-147 before their deployment to Viet Nam.

== Haitian activities ==
Garrison's long-term involvement with Haiti commenced in August 1980 when he accompanied Burt Lancaster as Producer/Director of a TV segment on paranormal phenomena. Lancaster was to be the host. They hoped to capture the secrets of Voodoo. Their project paralleled one by Wade Davis as he gathered material for his book, The Serpent and the Rainbow The crew filmed dozens of ceremonies around the countryside. Near midnight of August 23/24 Garrison's crew was almost killed by peasants as they tried to dig up a Zombie in the cemetery near Desdunnes, in the Artibonite Valley.

By August 1991, Garrison was back in the political arena and, arguably, a military role as a personal advisor to Haiti's military ruler, Lieutenant General Raoul Cédras, the US Senate and, allegedly, the DIA and CIA. He acted as the interface between the American embassy and Cedras after diplomatic relations were severed; his code name was "'The Shadow". While operating from Haiti’s Grande Quartier General, Garrison searched Aristide’s offices, and living quarters, in the National Palace immediately following Aristide’s September 29, 1991 flight into exile. He recovered Aristide’s medicines and medical record which became the basis for his controversial 1991 Aristide CIA profile, presented to the Senate Foreign Relations Committee by Jesse Helmes.

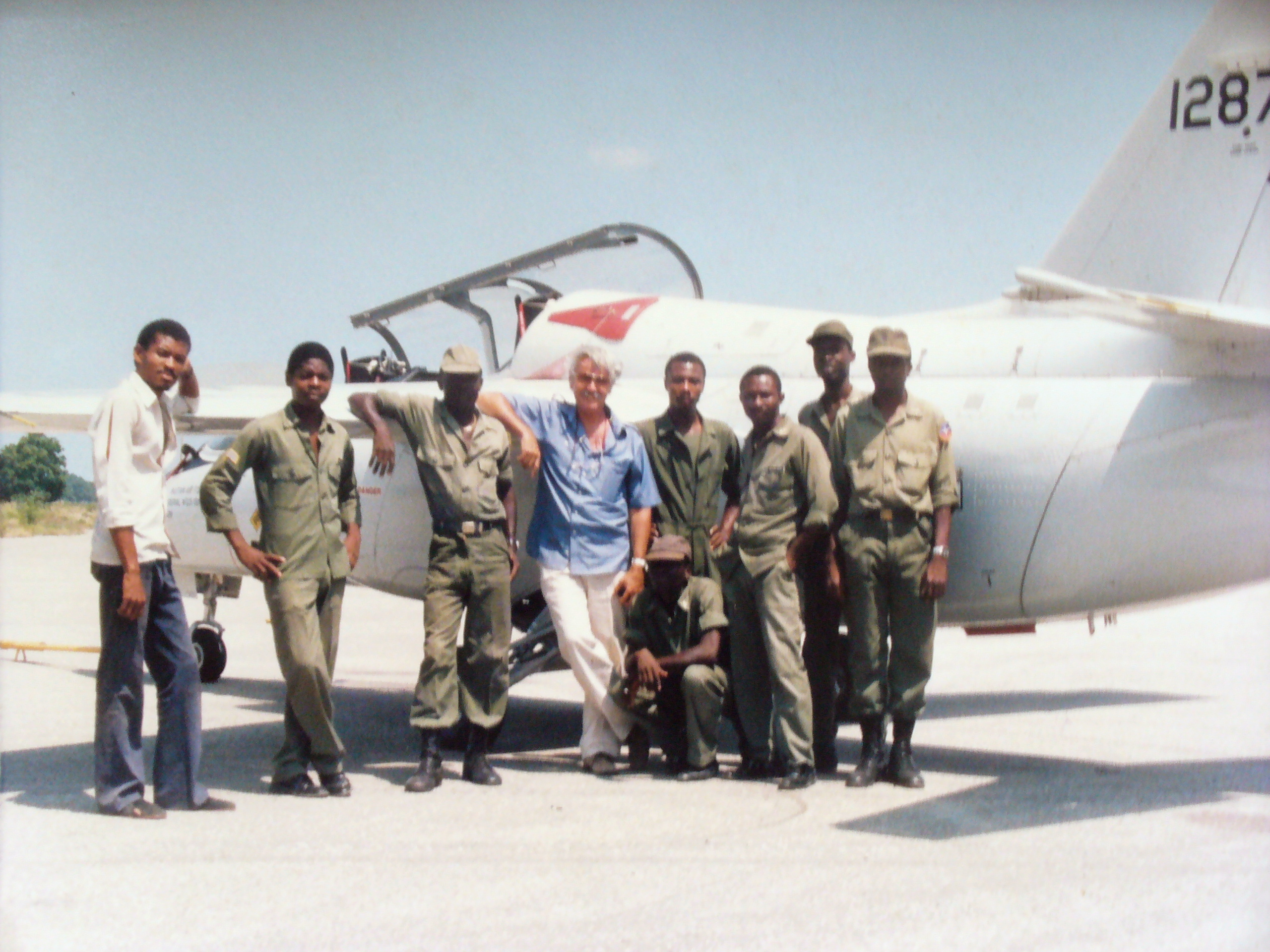
Garrison with Haitian Corps d’Aviation Marchetti and crew, 1990

In June 1992, Garrison, working with Colonel Pat Collins, the Military Liaison Officer with the American embassy, wrote a White Paper visualizing modification of the Forces Armeés d'Haiti (FAdH) into what they called, an Army of the People. This saw the FAdH undertake many projects to support Haiti's population, including road building, school and hospital construction, revival of the nation's 23 airfields and interdiction of drug traffic from Central and South America. Mobile medical/dental clinics, staffed by military personnel, were to be a major factor in the program. A team of 700 Canadian and American military engineers and technical staff was dispatched to Haiti on the USS Harlan County, on 11 October 1993, but left Haitian waters when its captain, Commander Butcher, perceived dangers not seen by Colonel J.T.F. Pulley, 7th Special Forces chief on board.

In a final effort to avoid a full scale invasion of Haiti, on September 18, President Clinton sent a three-man delegation, made up of Jimmy Carter, Sam Nunn and Colin Powell to negotiate with Cedras. The American negotiators used Garrison's office, located adjacent to that of Cedras, as the focal point of their communications with Clinton's team. Their CIA crew had installed a scrambled telephone there, with “white noise machines" to preclude electronic eavesdropping. In his book Hazardous Duty, David Hackworth recounted the final moments before the invasion, in which Garrison's eavesdropping, from a next door office, on a call between President Clinton’s office, and the Carter, Nunn, Powell team, revealed the fact that a 61 aircraft attack force was airborne and enroute to Haiti. Hackworth wrote, “The dream team had all the high-tech stuff. But they were being screwed by the most time-worn spy gimmick in the books: the old ear-to-the-hole-in-the-wall-trick. Garrison told General Biamby what he heard and Biamby acted, shielding Garrison’s identity.” In his book, My American Journey, Colin Powell wrote: ”At 4:00 Biamby burst into the room. ‘The invasion is coming,’ he shouted. He had just been on the phone with a source at Fort Bragg, he told us, and American paratroopers were getting ready to board their aircraft at 5:00 P.M. Not bad intelligence, I thought, for a poor nation.”

They met with President Émile Jonassaint to negotiate a peaceful occupation. Garrison’s intercession effectively derailed a bloody invasion with predictions of 25,000 potential civilian casualties. Aristide returned on October 15, 1994.

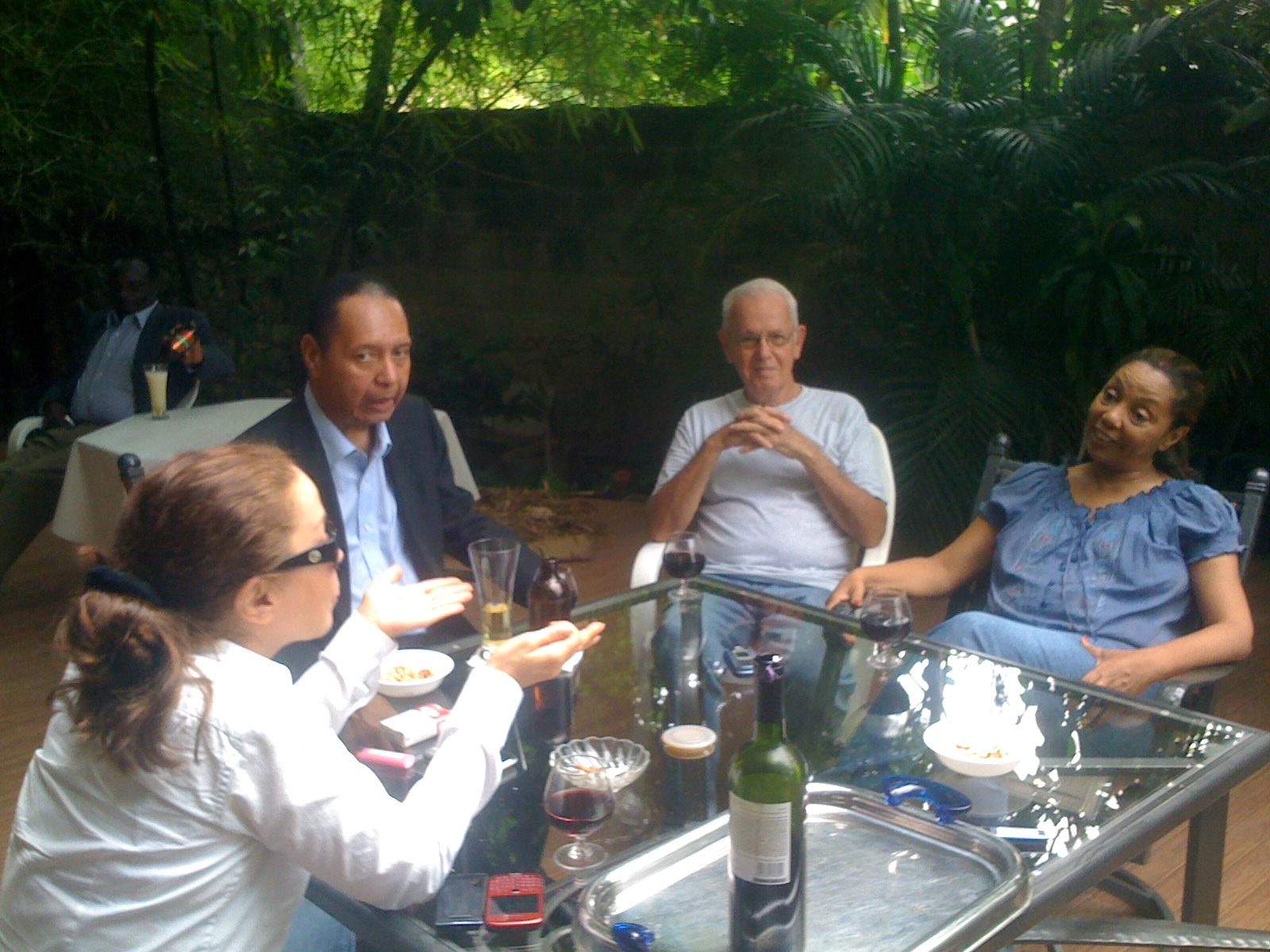
Veronique Roy, President Jean Claude Duvalier, Lynn Garrison and Carolle Tranchant on deck of Tranchant's home in July 2011

On the night of August 4/5, 1994 an attempt was made on the lives of Garrison and Carolle Tranchant, his wife. A gunman fired 32 rounds from his Uzi through their bedroom window, shredding their mattress as Garrison returned fire through the shattered glass, hitting the gunman.

Garrison is credited with coordinating the effort that held Aristide out of Haiti from September 29, 1991 till October 15, 1994. Because of this he remained outside Haiti, though still heavily involved, until Aristide’s second flight into exile, in February 2004.

On August 26, 2004, Prime Minister Gerard Latortue signed a 5 year contract with Garrison’s Caribbean Marine Institute for the research and salvage of all vessels sunk in Haitian territorial waters. During the pirate heydays, Hispaniola, now present day Haiti, was the base for pirates who attacked treasure laden Spanish galleons headed from the Caribbean to Europe. This included Columbus’ Santa Maria, lost off Cap-Haïtien in 1492, and the pirate Captain Morgan’s flagship HMS Oxford, blown up off Isle Île à Vache, off the coast of Haïti in 1669.

In January, 2011 Garrison helped coordinate the return of President Jean Claude Duvalier to Haiti and brought a team, led by Congressman Bob Barr to deal with the media. Garrison arranged for Congressman Bob Barr to act as lobbyist for President Jovenel Moise.

== Retirement ==
Garrison's Haitian Children's Fund is coordinating distribution of donated One World Futbol soccer balls in Haiti as part of a Chevrolet sponsored worldwide project to acquire and distribute containers of these undeflatable balls to Third World countries.

During 2013 Garrison created the Satellite School System which could deliver lesson-plans from the best educators to any point on the map. The system includes a TV station with uplink to Galaxy 25. Individual modules, consisting of dish antenna, receiver, and wide screen TV, powered by solar panels, inverter and batteries. Instant schools can be created by using 2 40 foot containers with joining roof.

== Personal life ==
Garrison's ancestors migrated from Ireland to Pennsylvania in 1728. Some moved on to Kentucky and then to Marion County, Illinois. Garrison's great grandfather, William Lloyd Garrison (born ca. 1830-32, not to be confused with William Lloyd Garrison, Jr. (1838–1909), the son of the abolitionist of the same name), served with the 40th Illinois Volunteer Infantry Regiment during the American Civil War. He lost his leg in the Battle of Shiloh, and was subsequently released from service on 18 October 1862.
