= Jack D. Hunter =

American writer

- Born: Jack Dayton Hunter; June 4, 1921; Hamilton, Ohio, U.S.
- Died: April 13, 2009 (aged 87)
- Resting place: Jacksonville National Cemetery, Jacksonville, Florida, U.S.
- Education: Pennsylvania State University (BA)
- Occupations: Author; artist
- Parent(s): Whitney G. Hunter; Irene Dayton Hunter

Jack Dayton Hunter (June 4, 1921 – April 13, 2009) was an American author and artist, best known for his novel The Blue Max, which was made into a film of the same name.

== Biography ==
Hunter was born in Hamilton, Ohio, on June 4, 1921, the son of Whitney G. and Irene Dayton Hunter. While his father, whose long career with the DuPont Company began as a paint color evaluator because of his sensitivity to colors, Hunter was red-green blind. He graduated with a B.A. degree in journalism from Penn State University in 1943.

Because he spoke German, having taught himself and then studied it in college, Hunter was sent to Germany just after the war ended.

"Operation Nursery," including Jack Hunter's role in it, forms the basis of the nonfiction book The Axmann Conspiracy: The Nazi Plan for a Fourth Reich and How the U.S. Army Defeated It, Berkley Books (Penguin), Sept. 2012.

After the war, he worked in various journalistic capacities, as a public relations executive for Du Pont, and as a speech writer in Washington D.C.

His first novel was The Blue Max. Hunter, who dabbled in water colors, painted a cover image for the book.

Hunter wrote 17 novels, including The Ace, published in 2008. Like The Blue Max, The Ace deals with World War I aviation, but focuses on the human costs and chaotic conditions that bedeviled the Americans in their need to build a world-class air force virtually overnight.

During the 1980s, Hunter served as the writing coach for reporters working at the (now defunct) Jacksonville Journal, the Florida Times-Union, which still publishes in Jacksonville, and the St. Augustine Record, which still publishes in St. Augustine. In this role, which continued three days a week for 10 years, Hunter provided encouragement, tutelage and support to hundreds of journalists, some of whom went on to work at The New York Times, The Denver Post, The Miami Herald and in many other venues.

He lived in St. Augustine, Florida, until he died at age 87 on April 13, 2009. He was interred at the Jacksonville National Cemetery.

== Bibliography ==
The Bruno Stachel series

- The Blue Max (1964) ISBN 0-7351-0456-5
- The Blood Order (1979) ISBN 0-7351-0458-1
- The Tin Cravat (1981) ISBN 0-7351-0454-9

Other novels

- The Expendable Spy (1965) ISBN 0-7351-0514-6
- One of Us Works for Them (1967)
- Spies, Inc (1969)
- The Terror Alliance (1980) ISBN 0-7351-0511-1
- Florida is Closed Today (1982) ISBN 0-8439-2172-2
- Judgment in Blood (1986) ISBN 0-7351-0510-3
- The Flying Cross (1987) ISBN 0-7351-0509-X
- Tailspin (1990) ISBN 0-7351-0513-8
- The Potsdam Bluff (1991) ISBN 0-380-75356-1
- Sweeney's Run (1992) ISBN 0-7351-0448-4
- Slingshot (1995) ISBN 0-7351-0451-4
- Addie (2001) (written under the pen name Lee Thompson) ISBN 0-7862-3364-8
- The Cure (2003) ISBN 0-7653-0648-4
- The Ace (2008) ISBN 978-0-9799240-6-4
