= The Blue Max =

1966 British film by John Guillermin

- Original poster by Frank McCarthy
- Directed by: John Guillermin
- Screenplay by: David Pursall; Jack Seddon; Gerald Hanley
- Story by: Ben Barzman; Basilio Franchina
- Based on: The Blue Max; 1964 novel by Jack D. Hunter
- Produced by: Christian Ferry
- Starring: George Peppard; James Mason; Ursula Andress; Jeremy Kemp; Karl Michael Vogler; Anton Diffring
- Cinematography: Douglas Slocombe
- Edited by: Max Benedict
- Music by: Jerry Goldsmith
- Color process: Color by DeLuxe
- Production company: 20th Century fox
- Distributed by: 20th Century Fox
- Release dates: 30 June 1966 (London); 21 June 1966 (USA)
- Running time: 156 minutes
- Countries: United Kingdom; United States
- Language: English
- Budget: $5 million
- Box office: $16,151,612

The Blue Max is a 1966 war film directed by John Guillermin and starring George Peppard, James Mason, Ursula Andress, Karl Michael Vogler, and Jeremy Kemp. The film was made in DeLuxe Color and was one of the last movies filmed in CinemaScope. It was filmed entirely in Ireland, and included numerous location scenes shot in Dublin, Wicklow and Cork. The plot is about German fighter pilot Bruno Stachel on the Western Front during World War I. The screenplay was written by David Pursall, Jack Seddon, and Gerald Hanley, based on the novel of the same name by Jack D. Hunter as adapted by Ben Barzman and Basilio Franchina.

In contrast to films that romanticize the flying aces of the Great War, The Blue Max depicts the protagonist Stachel as a man who appears to have no regard for anyone but himself. Set against the realities of modern warfare, the film also explores the decline of chivalry and the advent of total war.

== Plot ==
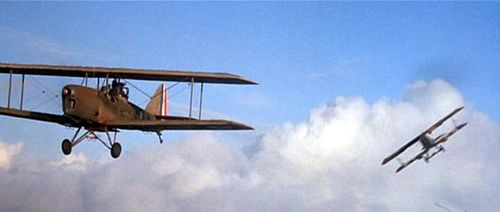
A Caudron C.270 Luciole and a Pfalz D.III from Lynn Garrison's collection in flight over Weston Aerodrome, Ireland

German Corporal Bruno Stachel leaves the fighting in the trenches of World War I to become a fighter pilot in the German Army Air Service. Of modest origins (his father ran a small hotel), Leutnant Stachel needs to prove himself and in spring 1918, he sets his sights on winning Germany's highest medal for valour, the "Blue Max", for which he must shoot down 20 aircraft. Leutnant Willi von Klugermann resents having a commoner as his rival. Their commanding officer, Hauptmann Otto Heidemann, is an aristocrat whose belief in chivalry and the laws and customs of war conflict with Stachel's disregard for them.

On his first mission, Stachel shoots down a British S.E.5, but receives no credit because there were no witnesses. Stachel searches the countryside for the wreckage, which gives the impression that he cares more about himself than the death of his wingman. When he attacks an Allied two-man observation aircraft and incapacitates the rear gunner on another sortie, he signals the pilot to fly to Stachel's airfield. The rear gunner revives as they approach and reaches for his machine-gun. Stachel shoots the aircraft down and a disgusted Heidemann believes that Stachel has committed a war crime in his pursuit of personal glory.

The incident brings Stachel to the attention of Willi's uncle, Generaloberst Count von Klugermann who visits the base with his wife Kaeti, who is having a discreet affair with Willi. The Count sees propaganda value in the commoner Stachel. After Stachel is shot down rescuing a red Fokker Dr.I from two British fighters, he's introduced to Manfred von Richthofen, the Red Baron. Richthofen offers Stachel a place in his squadron. Stachel declines, expressing his desire to "prove himself" with Heidemann's squadron. When Stachel is temporarily grounded by a minor injury, General von Klugermann orders him to Berlin to help shore up crumbling public morale. The general invites him to dinner, and Stachel spends the night with Kaeti.

On a mission escorting a reconnaissance aircraft, Stachel's guns jam, but Willi downs three enemy planes. Willi challenges Stachel to a flying contest on their return to base, flying under a railway viaduct. Willi is killed when his plane hits a building and crashes. When Stachel reports his death to Heidemann he impulsively claims Willi's victories, even though he fired only 40 bullets before his guns jammed. Outraged, Heidemann accuses him of lying, but the Air Service backs Stachel. Later, he admits to Kaeti that he lied.

During a strafing mission covering the retreat of the German Army, Stachel disobeys orders and engages enemy fighters. The rest of the squadron follows him. Later, Heidemann confronts him because half his pilots were killed in the ensuing dogfight in which Stachel shot down enough aircraft to finally qualify for the Blue Max. Heidemann submits a report recommending a court-martial and both men are ordered to Berlin where von Klugermann tells Heidemann that Stachel is to receive the Blue Max because the people need a hero. The general orders Heidemann to withdraw his report. Instead, Heidemann resigns his command. Later that evening, Kaeti visits Stachel and suggests they flee to neutral Switzerland, since defeat is inevitable. Stachel refuses.

The next day, Stachel is awarded the Blue Max by the Crown Prince in a public ceremony. Field Marshal von Lenndorf telephones von Klugermann to order him to stop the ceremony since an investigation has been opened into Stachel's claim. The general realises Kaeti is responsible for leaking information. When Heidemann reports that the new monoplane that he has just test-flown is a "death trap" with weak struts, von Klugermann tells Stachel, "Let's see some real flying". Stachel's aerobatics cause the aircraft to break up and crash, killing him.

== Cast ==
- George Peppard as Leutnant Bruno Stachel
- James Mason as Generaloberst Graf von Klugermann
- Ursula Andress as Käti Gräfin von Klugermann
- Jeremy Kemp as Leutnant Willi Ritter von Klugermann
- Karl Michael Vogler as Hauptmann Otto Ritter von Heidemann
- Anton Diffring as Major Holbach
- Harry Towb as Kettering
- Peter Woodthorpe as Rupp
- Derek Newark as Ziegel
- Derren Nesbitt as Fabian
- Loni von Friedl as Elfi Heidemann
- Friedrich von Ledebur as Field Marshal
- Carl Schell as Manfred von Richthofen
- Hugo Schuster as Hans
- Alex Scott as Orator
- Roger Ostime as The Crown Prince

Cast notes: The casting of George Peppard in the mainly international ensemble cast was considered a "safe" choice, as he was establishing a reputation for leading roles in action films. Although youthful looking, at 37 years of age, he was much older than the Stachel depicted in the novel. Peppard wanted to create an "authentic" performance and learned to fly, earned a private pilot's license and did some of his own flying in the film, although stunt pilot Derek Piggott was at the controls for the under-the-bridge scene.

== Novel ==
Jack Hunter's debut novel was published in 1964. The New York Times called it "entertaining".

The novel was optioned by 20th Century Fox, which in October 1964 assigned Ben Barzman and Basilio Franchina to write the script. In December, Fox announced that it would make the film the following summer.

=== Compared to film ===
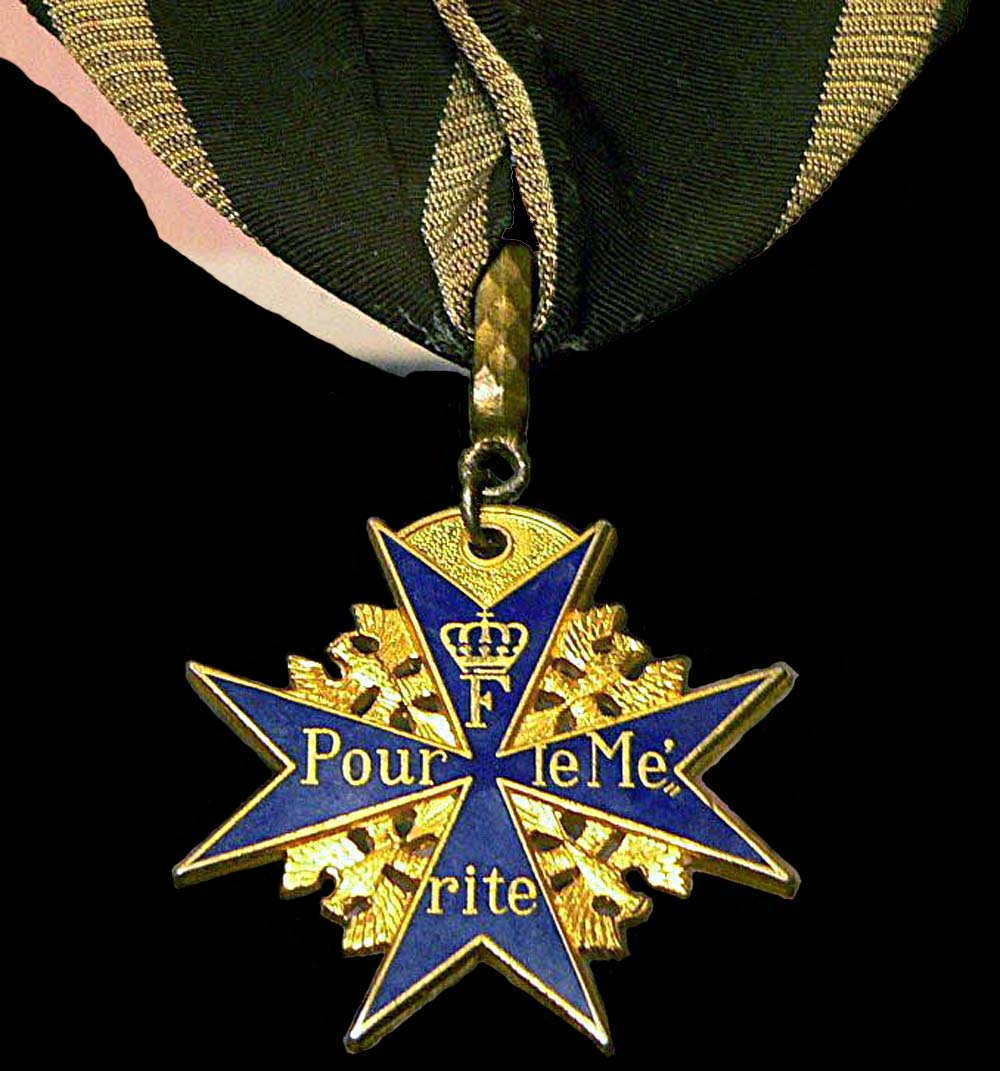
Pour le Mérite, informally known as the "Blue Max", the highest military honour that the Kingdom of Prussia could bestow during World War I.

The film differs from the book on which it is based both in the plot and the portrayal of the characters. Some of the differences are:

Bruno Stachel: The movie portrays Stachel initially as an idealistic, humble and naïve man who evolves into someone willing to do whatever it takes to get his way. He is also depicted as being insecure about his lower-class background and desires to prove himself an equal aviator and man to the aristocrats by earning the Blue Max. The vain attempt by Stachel to confirm his first kill occurs only in the film. There is also no confrontation with Heidemann, who takes a swift dislike to Stachel over claiming aircraft that Willi had shot down.

Stachel was played by the 37-year-old George Peppard, in stark contrast to the 19-year-old character of the novel. From the beginning of the novel, Stachel is a deeply troubled alcoholic with a penchant for lying. Obsessed with earning the last of the new Fokker D.VIIs, he kills Willi to obtain it. In the novel, Heidemann exhibits an immediate favouritism toward the newcomer and credits Stachel with his first victories, and Kettering, the squadron adjutant, refuses to comply until Heidemann orders him to do so.

At the end of the novel, Heidemann reveals that he has been secretly boosting Stachel's achievements as part of an experiment in publicity management. Stachel earns his Blue Max not from 20 victories but by destroying three aircraft and capturing one after Heidemann's guns jam. (Stachel is so drunk that he cannot even recall the engagement.) He is also honoured for saving the life of a French girl who falls into a river. Stachel does not die in the book and in fact meets the future commander-in-chief of the Luftwaffe, Hauptmann Hermann Göring. Stachel marries Kaeti von Klugermann after the death of Graf von Klugermann, as is noted at the beginning of The Blood Order, the second book in Jack Hunter's Stachel series.

Hauptmann Heidemann: Heidemann's deep longing to be with his wife and her growing depression over his absence are more subtle in the movie than in the book. In the novel, Heidemann does not accuse Stachel of brutality in the shooting down of the British aircraft over their airfield. He regards Stachel as the best pilot in the Jasta after himself and has already planned to assign Stachel one of the new Fokker D.VIIs. In the novel, Heidemann, not General von Klugermann, is the one who recognises the propaganda value of building Stachel up into a hero and uses that as a means to get himself reassigned to Berlin to be near his wife.

Willi von Klugermann: Willi is described as a "fat aristocrat" in the book who has only one victory more than Stachel. In the film, Willi is leaner and more arrogant and competitive and earns a Blue Max shortly after Stachel's arrival. In the book, Willi regards Stachel as a close friend, and his affair with Kaeti is revealed only after his death when Stachel reads his journal. Unlike the movie, they are never rivals for her affection. In the novel, Willi is murdered by Stachel to obtain the last of the five new Fokker D VIIs allotted to the squadron. In the movie, Willi is accidentally killed in an aerial competition with Stachel over who is the better pilot.

General von Klugermann: In the movie, the count is a career General-Oberst in the German Army. In the novel, his title is Graf, and he is a famous surgeon who has researched alcoholism and other addictions. Unlike the film, the Graf and the Gräfin do not have an open marriage. In the film, General von Klugermann recognises the social turmoil erupting in Germany and presents Stachel as a lower-class hero. Doctor von Klugermann, an aristocrat, recognises the unfair nature of Germany's class system and disapproves of it but makes no effort at change.

Käti von Klugermann: Käti's character in the book and film are similar. The Gräfin comes from the lower classes but relishes her status and wealth. Both characters deftly use sexuality to get what they want. In the book, while she is drunk, Stachel extorts money from Käti with his knowledge of her affair with Willi. Later, she blackmails Stachel to marry her by threatening to reveal his murder of Willi and two British pilots. In the film, she proposes for Stachel to run away with her to Switzerland, which he refuses. For that slight, she exposes Stachel's lies. Her husband, the General, then sends Stachel to his death in an unstable aircraft to preserve the honour of the officer corps.

Elfi Heidemann: In both the novel and the film, Elfi is a nurse stationed in Berlin. In the book, Elfi is an alcoholic who overcomes her addiction with the assistance of Doctor von Klugermann. Stachel recognises Elfi as his kindred spirit, and after Heidemann's death, seeks to form a relationship with her. Käti literally stops him at Elfi's door, which forces Stachel to marry her instead. Stachel ruefully accepts his fate to return to Käti and alcoholism.

Corporal Rupp: Rupp has only a minor role in the movie. In the novel, he is an Unteroffizier and thoroughly distasteful character, and Stachel describes him as "a pig of a man". He earns extra money by smuggling cheap booze to Stachel and by using one of the squadron's reconnaissance cameras to take pornographic pictures for Kettering's extensive collection of erotica. In the end, it is Rupp who provides Kaeti with evidence that implicates Stachel in Willi's murder.

Conclusion: In the movie, Heidemann flies the monoplane first and determines that it is a "death trap" because the struts are too weak for the wing loading. General von Klugermann then sends Stachel to his death to shield the German Officer Corps from the shame of Stachel's false claim of two victories. In the novel, it is Stachel who tries out the new monoplane, finds the defect and then allows Heidemann to fly the aircraft. Before Heidemann takes off, Stachel tries to stop him to save his life, but Heidemann continues and dies. Hunter's novel ends with Stachel meeting a young Hermann Göring, who has assumed command of the vaunted "Flying Circus" after the death of its commander, Manfred von Richthofen.

== Production ==
George Peppard's casting was announced in April 1965. The job of directing was given to John Guillermin, who had impressed Fox's studio head, Darryl F Zanuck, with Guns at Batasi (1964) and Rapture (1965), two lower budgeted films he made for Fox. The film was shot in Ireland, at Bray, County Wicklow's Ardmore Studios. The budget was originally $3 million.

Fox spent $250,000 on building nine war planes. Peppard learned to fly for the film and later called working with Guillermin "the most exciting creative experience I've ever had." Director of photography Douglas Slocombe was hospitalized for three weeks with an injured back. Elmo Williams said Guillermin was "indifferent to people getting hurt as long as he got realistic action...a hard-working, overly critical man whom the crew disliked."

=== Stunt flying ===
The majority of the aircraft used in the film were converted Tiger Moths and Stampe SV.4s. Two Pfalz D.IIIs were produced (by two separate companies) for the film, along with three Fokker D.VIIs and two Fokker Dr.I triplanes. Other German aircraft were represented by repainted Tiger Moths and Stampes. Two S.E.5 flying replicas were made by the Miles Aircraft company at Shoreham-by-Sea in West Sussex, England. Other British aircraft were mocked-up trainers made into British S.E.5s. The German lozenge camouflage was not universal to all units at the time the story takes place (Spring 1918), but, in the film, aircraft of all German units are shown in this scheme.

The Fokker Dr.I triplanes were purpose-built replicas. The Tiger Moth silhouette was more appropriate to British aircraft of the period, such as the S.E.5a (one of which Stachel shoots down during his first mission) and presents a good general impression of actual contemporary aircraft.

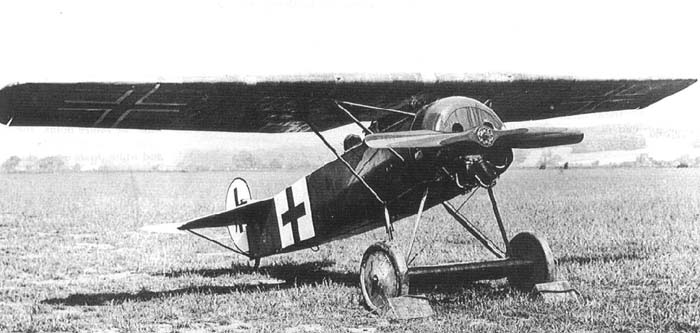
Fokker E.V

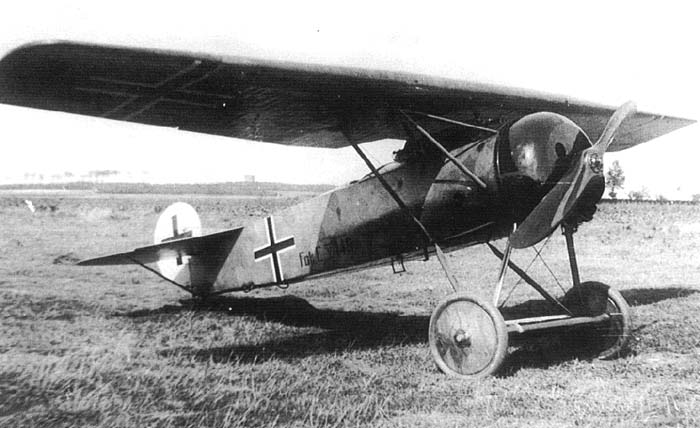
Fokker D.VIII

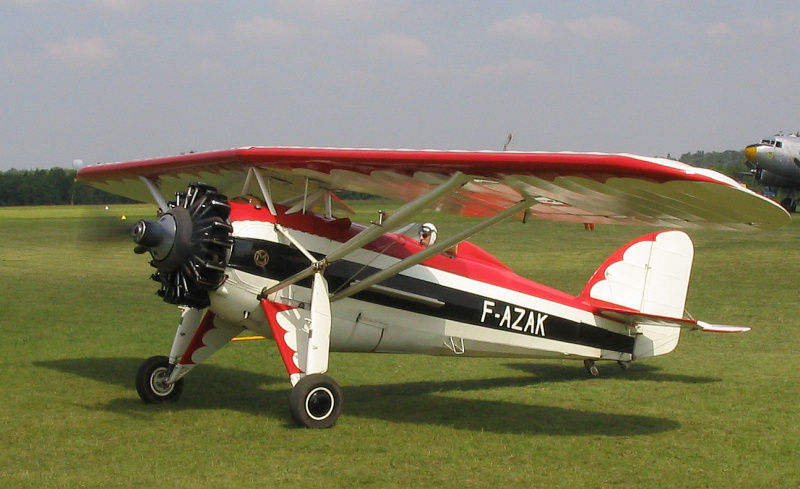
Morane-Saulnier MS.230

The "death-trap" monoplane at the end of the film, known as the "Adler" (German for eagle) in the novel, may have been inspired by the Fokker E.V, which was a late-war monoplane design which did indeed rapidly gather a reputation for poor construction of the wing, resulting in several crashes before being modified and re-designated the Fokker D.VIII. In the film it is portrayed by Patrick Lindsay's Morane-Saulnier MS.230 Parasol trainer, with a faired-over front seat to simulate a monoplane fighter visually.

The depictions of aerial combat in the film are particularly realistic. The aircraft ground scenes were shot at Weston Aerodrome near Dublin (which should not be confused with RAF Weston-on-the-Green, England).

Pilots from the Irish Air Corps helped recreate the live dog-fight scenes, supported by a number of civilians, including former Air Transport Auxiliary pilot Joan Hughes, who flew one of the Pfalz replicas, Charles Boddington and Derek Piggott. Piggott was the only pilot willing to fly beneath the spans of a bridge. Taking the role of both German pilots and with multiple takes from contrasting camera angles, he ended up flying 15 times under the wide span of the 19th-century Carrickabrack Railway Viaduct in Fermoy, County Cork, Ireland, and 17 times under the narrower span. The two Fokker Dr.I triplane replicas had about four feet (1.2 metres) of clearance on each side when passing through the narrower span. He was able to fly through the arch reliably by aligning two scaffolding poles, one in the river and one on the far bank. Just before the scenes of flying beneath the bridge, one of the Triplanes executes what could be considered a near-perfect barrel roll as seen from aft of the two Dr.Is used for the scene. Off screen, actor George Peppard flew one of the Pfalz used in the movie.

The director had placed a flock of sheep next to the bridge so that they would scatter as the aircraft approached to show that the stunt was real and not simulated with models. However, by later takes, the sheep had become accustomed to the aircraft, and had to be scared by the shepherd instead. In the printed take, the sheep continued to graze, creating a continuity error which can be seen in the finished film.

The entire collection of aircraft, uniforms and supporting equipment was purchased from 20th Century Fox by ex-Royal Canadian Air Force pilot Lynn Garrison. He kept the collection together in Ireland under his company, Blue Max Aviation, Ltd. Over the following years they played a part in You Can't Win 'Em All (1970), Darling Lili (1970), Zeppelin (1971), Von Richthofen and Brown (1971), and various television commercials, including a classic Ridley Scott production promoting Opel Manta's limited edition "Blue Max." Both of the Pfalz replicas and one Fokker D.VII now belong to New Zealand film director Peter Jackson's 1914–18 Trust, with the Viv Bellamy-designed Pfalz now being on display at the Omaka Aviation Heritage Centre in New Zealand. All three aircraft are kept in fully airworthy condition. Another of the Fokker D.VII's is on display at the Southern Museum of Flight in Birmingham, Alabama.

=== Locations ===
The scenes where the Germans come into the French village were filmed on Calary Bog in County Wicklow, Ireland. For many weeks, the building of the village attracted the locals to watch it coming up. Then it was bombed and made to look destroyed. It was a local tourist attraction for a long time after the film had wrapped.

The Berlin scenes were shot in Dublin. Christ Church Cathedral and Leinster House, the seat of the Oireachtas, the Irish national parliament, are easily recognisable in the background of many scenes and Trinity College served as the army headquarters where von Klugermann's office is located.

Many of the flying scenes were shot at Weston Airport (EIWT) near Lucan, Ireland, about 10 miles west of Dublin hence the name confusion with Weston-on-the-Green, England. Today there is a restaurant named after the movie at the Aerodrome. The final scene where Stachel meets his fate was filmed at Baldonnel, the Irish Air Corps' main base. The hangars seen in the movie were built for the Royal Air Force in 1918.

The Carrickabrack Viaduct in Fermoy, County Cork was used for the scenes where Stachel and Von Klugermann (James Mason) flew several times under the railway bridge. The view from the 19th-century railway bridge which spans the Blackwater is spectacular and it was one of the reasons the producers of The Blue Max chose it as one of the locations for the film.

=== Historical accuracy ===
In an article entitled "About The Blue Max" the author, Jack D. Hunter, wrote:

On the day of our arrival at the Bray Studios, we were shown to canvas director’s chairs with our names on the back and treated to rushes of some key action sequences. And I was literally left speechless when I saw Fokker D-7s with inverted engines and 1916-style insignia, Dr-1s with radial engines and smoke canisters on their landing gear struts, machine-guns that looked like Space Cadet props spouting flame without benefit of ammo tracks, every pilot wearing an Uhlan uniform and Battle of Britain style goggles, Gypsy Moths pretending to be Albatros D-3s, a Stampe presented as an RE-8—the anachronisms and goofs compounded. When I asked Delang about it later, he merely shrugged, rolled his eyes, and sighed resignedly. When I challenged the art director on something so glaring as a D-7 with curve-sided crosses, he shrugged, too. "That kind of cross photographs better," he said. Ah, but how about those machine-guns with no ammo feed tracks? Another shrug. "No big deal. People just watch the muzzle flashes."

So much for the definitive World War I aviation movie.

== Music ==
The producers chose Jerry Goldsmith to compose the score after offering the job to Ron Goodwin, who was working on another score. With Goldsmith, they requested a Germanic composition. Goldsmith was even introduced to the project with scenes incorporating a "temp track" from Richard Strauss's Also sprach Zarathustra. Goldsmith said of this experience "I admit it worked fairly well but my first reaction was to get up and walk away from the job. Once you've heard music like that with the picture, it makes your own scoring more difficult to arrive at."

Goldsmith used a large orchestra, some cues requiring over 100 musicians, with large brass and percussion sections as well as a wind machine. On 4 April 1966, he conducted the soundtrack with the National Philharmonic Orchestra led by Sidney Sax at Shepperton Studios in London. These recordings were released on LP by Mainstream Records in 1966, and re-released on LP by Citadel Records in 1976. The soundtrack was released on CD by Varèse Sarabande in 1985 and by Sony in 1995 (with seven cues of source music from the movie arranged by Arthur Morton). The score was once again released, this time complete and in correct film order with accurate track listings, by speciality-label Intrada in 2010. On 4 March 2014, LaLaLand Records reissued the score on a 2-disc set, including all source music and alternatives. Mike Matessino performed the restoration and remastering, making this the definitive release of this score, with vastly improved sound.

André Previn chose an extended passacaglia from the score to perform on his television program Previn and the Pittsburgh in 1978 on the episode "Music that Made the Movies".

Five tracks of music from the film ("Overture", "First Flight", "The Bridge", "The Attack" and "Finale") were recorded on 11 March 1987, at Walthamstow Assembly Hall, London, and are incorporated as Tracks 1–5 into the CD, Goldsmith Conducts Goldsmith, played by the Philharmonia Orchestra and subsequently released by Silva Screen Records in 2002 (FILMCD336), though it had been originally released in 1989 by the Decca Record Co. Ltd./Filmtrax plc.

== Reception ==
=== Critical ===
On Rotten Tomatoes, the film has an approval rating of 100% based on reviews from 6 critics, with an average rating of 6.1/10.

Although The Blue Max was seen as a quasi-historical account, some critics decried what they considered an intrusive sub-plot tying a World War I story into the "modern theme of the corruption of the military-industrial complex." Even though the music and the flying scenes were considered the film's redemption, some aviation observers criticised what they thought was a wooden characterisation by Peppard's performance of a dog-fighting combat pilot from military aviation's heroic age.

Robert Alden of The New York Times wrote, "What is by far the best thing about The Blue Max ... is that this élan, this glory, is captured on film once again. With the technological improvements of the years, the skies were never bluer or wider, the war in the air or on the ground never more realistic ... The question each filmgoer will have to ask himself is how much of what is bad in The Blue Max is he willing to take in exchange for what is good. Much of the earthbound drama of this lengthy film is tangled, confusing, clumsy."

Arthur D. Murphy of Variety called it "a World War I combat drama with some exciting aerial sequences helping to enliven a somewhat grounded, meller (sic) script in which no principal character engenders much sympathy."

Philip K. Scheuer of the Los Angeles Times wrote of the film that "The aerial dogfights have thrilling impact ... Its fault is that it doesn't give one anybody to pull for, so that aside from admiration for the men who fly these flimsy, antiquated crates one's sympathies are rarely engaged."

Richard L. Coe of The Washington Post wrote that "the flight sequences and the fantastically frail-looking planes run away with the picture ... Director John Guillemin rightly makes the most of Skeets Kelly's aerial photography and those fabulous flying crates, but on the ground he misses what might have been an absorbing statement."

The Monthly Film Bulletin wrote that "the aerial dogfights are imaginative and lively" and James Mason "is in fine form," but "the film is padded out with tedious chunks of indoor chat between its set of largely unpleasant characters, filmed flatly in gloomy shades of grey and green for the most part."

FilmInk called it "a sports movie at heart."

=== Box office ===
The Blue Max was a financial success at the box office, earning $5 million in North American rentals in 1966. It was one of the twelve most popular films at the British box office in 1967.

According to Fox records, the film needed to earn $14,200,000 in rentals to break even and made $16,850,000. By 11 December 1970, it made Fox a profit of $2,830,000. It would be Peppard's last big commercial success until The A-Team.

=== Legacy ===
Director Peter Jackson listed the film as one of the top six World War I films.

== See also ==
- Aces High
- Von Richthofen and Brown
- Zeppelin
- List of British films of 1966
