= 1951 in aviation =

This is a list of aviation-related events from 1951:

== Events ==
- Three aerial refueling points are installed on a modified United States Air Force B-29 Superfortress, making it the world's first triple-point aerial tanker. During trials, it keeps six Royal Air Force Gloster Meteor F 8 fighters continuously aloft simultaneously for four hours at a time.
- President Harry S Truman presents the Collier Trophy to the United States Coast Guard for its development of the helicopter.
- With no aircraft left on order and no prospects for new orders, the Curtiss-Wright Corporation closes down its Aeroplane Division and sells all of its aircraft designs, projects, prototypes, and factories to North American Aviation.
- During the year, Aeropostal Alas de Venezuela (LAV) begins service between Venezuela and Lima, Peru, and Bogotá, Colombia.
- Early 1951 – The Royal Navy embarks a helicopter unit on an aircraft carrier for the first time, aboard HMS Indomitable.

=== January ===
- U.S. Navy aircraft from the aircraft carriers of Task Force 77 provide support to United Nations troops fighting on the front line in Korea, including long-range interdiction, emergency close air support, and air cover for landings and evacuations.
- January 1
  - The United States Air Force reestablishes the Air Defense Command. It also returns the Air Defense Command to the status of a major command, a status it has not held since December 1948.
  - The last remaining assets of Deutsche Luft Hansa are liquidated. The airline had been dissolved in 1945. The later German airline Lufthansa will have no legal connection to it.
- January 13 – An Air Carriers Douglas VC-47D-27-DK Skytrain (registration (VR-HEP) on a domestic flight in the Federation of Malaya crashes into the mountain Bukit Besar, killing all 10 people on board.
- January 14 – National Airlines Flight 83, a Douglas DC-4-1009 (registration N74685), overshoots the end of the runway and crashes in a ditch on landing at Philadelphia International Airport in Philadelphia, Pennsylvania, killing seven of the 28 people on board. Among the dead – five women and two infants – is the flight's only stewardess, Frankie Housley, who saves 10 passengers after the crash but then dies in the burning wreckage of the aircraft while trying to save an infant.
- January 16 – Northwest Orient Airlines Flight 115, a Martin 2-0-2 flying from Geiger Field in Spokane, Washington, to Pangborn Field in Wenatchee, Washington, crashes west of Reardan, Washington, killing all 10 people on board.
- January 21 – The U.S. Air Force F-84 Thunderjet makes its first kill, when F-84 pilot Lieutenant Colonel William E. Bertram shoots down a MiG-15 during the Korean War.
- January 27 – Lightning strikes the Alitalia Savoia-Marchetti SM.95B Ugolino Vivaldi (registration I-DALO) during a flight from Paris-Le Bourget Airport in Paris, France, to Roma-Ciampino Airport in Rome, Italy. The aircraft catches fire and crashes north of Civitavecchia, Italy, killing 14 of the 17 people on board.
- January 28 – Flying from Hong Kong to Japan in poor visibility, a Royal Air Force Short S.25 Sunderland GR.5 (registration PP107) crashes into Mount Yuli on Taiwan at an altitude of 5,000 feet (1,500 meters), killing all 14 people on board.
- January 31
  - On a flight in the privately owned P-51 Mustang Excalibur III to investigate the jet stream, U.S. Navy Captain Charles F. Blair, Jr., sets a record for a piston-engine aircraft by flying nonstop 3,478 miles (5,597 km) from New York City to London, England, in 7 hours 48 minutes at an average speed of 446 mph (718 km/h).
  - After aborting an attempted landing in heavy snowfall at Reykjavík Airport in Reykjavík, Iceland, an Icelandair Flugfélag Islands Douglas C-47A-10-DK Skytrain (registration TF-ISG) crashes in the Atlantic Ocean off Hafnarfjördur, killing all 20 people on board.
  - A Portuguese Army Aeronáutica Militar Douglas C-54D-1-DC Skymaster crashes into the Atlantic Ocean on approach to Lajes Field in the Azores, killing all 14 people on board.
  - The month ends as the worst for the United Nations forces in Korea in terms of air losses, with 44 U.N. aircraft lost to enemy ground fire alone. More than 600 American aircraft have been lost in air-to-air combat or due to enemy ground fire since the Korean War began in June 1950.

=== February ===
- The U.S. Joint Intelligence Committee reports that the Soviet Air Force has 20,000 aircraft to devote to the support of Soviet Army ground forces in the event of a war with the North Atlantic Treaty Organization (NATO), and estimates that the Soviet Union will have 120 atomic bombs in 1952.
- February 3 – The Air France Douglas DC-4-1009 Ciel de Savoie (registration F-BBDO) drifts off course during a flight from Douala Airport in Douala, French Cameroons, to Niamey Airport in Niamey, Niger, while approaching the mountains of British Cameroons. Flying into the sun, the crew fails to realize that they are on a collision course with Mount Cameroon (4,070 meters (13,350 feet). In the final seconds before impact, the pilot sees the mountain ahead and makes a sharp left turn, but the DC-4's left wing strikes the rising terrain and the aircraft crashes into the mountain at an altitude of 2,591 meters (8,501 feet), killing all 29 people on board.
- February 21 – English Electric Canberra BMk2 WD932 becomes the first jet to make an unrefuelled transatlantic flight, flying from RAF Aldergrove in Northern Ireland to Gander in Newfoundland, Canada. The Canberra makes the fight in a record time of 4 hours 37 minutes.
- February 26 – U.S. Navy carrier aircraft of Task Force 77 begin 38 consecutive days of attacks on enemy railroads and highways along the east coast of Korea.

=== March ===
- The United States Navy tank landing ship USS LST-799, fitted with a miniature flight deck, begins operations off Wonsan, Korea, with a detachment of two HO3S helicopters from Utility Helicopter Squadron 1 (UH-1). She becomes the first U.S. Navy ship to operate in the role of a helicopter carrier.
- The U.S. Air Force's Far East Air Forces establishes an air defense identification zone for South Korea, overlapping with North Korean airspace but primarily intended to protect South Korea from incursions by aircraft from the People's Republic of China.
- March 2
  - U.S. Navy AD Skyraiders of Attack Squadron 195 (VA-195) from the aircraft carrier USS Princeton (CV-37) begin a lengthy series of raids against a railroad bridge across a deep ravine south of Kilchu, Korea, discovered earlier that day by their commanding officer, Lieutenant Commander Harold Carlson. They damage the southern approach to the bridge in their first strike.
  - Mid-Continent Airlines Flight 16, a Douglas DC-3A (registration N19928) stalls during a left turn at low altitude on approach to Sioux City Municipal Airport in Sioux City, Iowa, and crashes, killing 16 of the 25 people on board.
- March 3 – The second strike by VA-195 against the Kilchu railroad bridge destroys one span, damages another span, and shifts two more spans out of line. Rear Admiral Ralph A. Ofstie, commanding Task Force 77, dubs the target "Carlson's Canyon."
- March 6 – The Martin aircraft company gains production rights to the English Electric Canberra as the B-57.
- March 7 – VA-195 makes its third strike against the railroad bridge in "Carlson's Canyon," dropping the northernmost of the two spans it had shifted in its March 3 attack.
- March 11 – A Pacific Overseas Airlines Douglas R5D-1 Skymaster (registration HS-POS) crashes into hills on Hong Kong Island just after takeoff from Kai Tak Airport in Hong Kong, killing all 24 people on board.
- March 15
  - VA-195 makes its fourth strike against the railroad bridge in "Carlson's Canyon," destroying some wooden replacement spans, dropping a span at the southern end, and damaging the northern approach. Later in the month, U.S. Air Force B-29 Superfortresses seed the valley floor with long-time-delay bombs.
  - A Qantas flying boat makes a survey flight from Sydney, Australia, to Valparaíso, Chile, via Easter Island, a first flight of this type across the South Pacific.
- March 21
  - Flying a U.S. Navy F9F Panther of Fighter Squadron 191 (VF-191) from the aircraft carrier USS Princeton (CV-37), Ensign Floryan "Frank" Sobieski is blinded by enemy ground fire over Korea. Guided and encouraged by his wingman, Lieutenant, junior grade, Pat Murphy, and assisted by Princeton's landing signal officer, Sobieski lands safely aboard Princeton without being able to see. He later recovers full vision.
  - During a domestic flight in Colombia from San Marcos Airport in San Marcos to Cartagena Airport in Cartagena, a LANSA Douglas R4D-1 Skytrain (registration HK-315), crashes near Hatonuevo, killing all 29 people on board.
- March 23 – A U.S. Air Force Douglas C-124A Globemaster II disappears over the North Atlantic Ocean during a flight from Loring Air Force Base in Limestone, Maine, to RAF Lakenheath in England, with the loss of all 53 people on board. Searchers find only a few small pieces of wreckage in the water 725 kilometers (450 miles) west of Shannon, Ireland. At the time, it is the deadliest accident involving a C-124 and the deadliest aviation accident to occur over the Atlantic Ocean.
- March 26 – An Aerolineas Argentinas Douglas C-47A-5-DK Skytrain (registration LV-ACY) crashes in Tierra del Fuego just after takeoff from Río Grande Airport in Rio Grande, Argentina, killing 11 of the 20 people on board.
- March 27 – An Air Transport Charter Douglas Dakota 3 crashes during a snowstorm shortly after takeoff from Ringway Airport in Manchester, England, killing four of the six people on board.
- March 28 – The United States Air Force establishes and activates the Eighteenth Air Force. It is responsible for discharging the Tactical Air Command's troop carrier responsibilities.

=== April ===
- United Nations intelligence estimates credit the People's Republic of China with 1,250 planes based in Manchuria, about 800 of them Soviet-built jets. Chief of Staff of the United States Air Force General Hoyt Vandenberg expresses concern that the U.N. is close to losing air superiority over North Korea.
- The United States Navy has activated 13 aircraft carriers from the National Defense Reserve Fleet to bolster its capabilities during the Korean War.
- April 1 – U.S. Navy carrier-based jets are used as fighter-bombers for the first time as F9F Panthers of Fighter Squadron 191 (VF-191) aboard USS Princeton (CV-37) attack a railroad bridge near Songjin, Korea, with 100- and 250-pound (45- and 113-kg) bombs.
- April 2 – The fifth and sixth strikes by U.S. Navy Attack Squadron 195 (VA-195) against the almost-rebuilt railroad bridge in "Carlson's Canyon" at Kilchu, Korea, leave only the concrete bridge piers standing. VA-195's campaign has defeated enemy attempts to repair the bridge. However, the North Koreans have built a bypass road with eight new bridges that are harder to hit and easier to repair, and keep their supplies moving, and VA-195 gives up on further strikes. VA-195's attacks on the bridge will inspire the 1953 novella The Bridges at Toko-ri by James Michener and the 1954 movie of the same name based on it.
- April 4 – U.S. Navy aircraft carriers of Task Force 77 conclude 38 consecutive days of aerial interdiction in Korea, during which their aviators have claimed the destruction of 54 railroad and 37 highway bridges and to have ruptured railroad tracks in 200 other places. The railroad system along the east coast of North Korea has been reduced from carrying two-thirds to carrying one-third of North Korean and Chinese supplies since the attacks began on February 25.
- April 6 – During a flight in California from Santa Maria Municipal Airport in Santa Maria to Santa Barbara Municipal Airport in Santa Barbara, Southwest Airways Flight 7 – a Douglas C-47A-90-DL Skytrain (registration N63439) – crashes into the rising slope of a ridge at an altitude of 2,740 feet (840 meters) in Refugio Pass, killing all 22 people on board.
- April 8 – A United States Air Force C-47B-1-DK Skytrain (registration 43–48298) on instrument approach to Kanawha Airport in Charleston, West Virginia, crashes into a tree-covered hill and catches fire, killing all 21 people on board.
- April 9 – A Siamese Airways Douglas DC-3 (registration HS-SAE0 diverts from Kai Tak Airport in Hong Kong to Tainan Airport in Tainan City, Taiwan, due to deteriorating weather conditions at Kai Tak. Bad weather causes Tainan Airport to close, however, and the DC-3 returns to Kai Tak. On approach to Kai Tak, it crashes into the sea off Cape D'Aguilar, killing all 16 people on board.
- April 12 – Forty-eight U.S. Air Force B-29 Superfortress bombers attack the Sinuiju Railway Bridge on the Yalu River.
- April 14 – After a flight of Soviet Air Forces 16th Air Army Ilyushin Il-10 (NATO reporting name "Beast") aircraft stationed with the Group of Soviet Forces in Germany departs Reinsdorf Airfield in East Germany for the bombing and strafing range at Lieberoser Heide, 13 of them crash across a wide area in the vicinity of Kemlitz, East Germany, killing 26 aircrew.
- April 21 – Four Yak-9 fighters attack two U.S. Marine Corps F4U Corsairs of Marine Fighter Squadron 312 (VMF-312) near Chinnampo, Korea. Marine Captain Philip C. DeLong shoots down two of them, while his wingman, Lieutenant H. Deigh, destroys one and damages the fourth.
- April 25 – Cubana de Aviación Flight 493, a Douglas DC-4, collides in mid-air with a U.S. Navy SNB-1 Kansan on an instrument training flight near Naval Air Station Key West in Key West, Florida. Both planes crash, killing all 39 people on board the DC-4 and the entire four-man crew of the SNB-1.
- April 26 – Testing of the prototype of the Northrop YRB-49A, the reconnaissance version of the Northrop YB-49 jet-powered flying wing bomber, ends abruptly after 13 flights, bringing the U.S. Air Force's YB-49 program to an end. The YRB-49A then is flown from Edwards Air Force Base, California, to the Northrop Corporation′s facility at Ontario International Airport in Ontario, California, where it lay abandoned at the edge of the airfield until scrapped in 1954.
- April 28 – United Airlines Flight 129, a Douglas DC-3A-197 (registration N16088), aborts its approach to land at Baer Field/Fort Wayne Municipal Airport in Fort Wayne, Indiana, after a severe thunderstorm with heavy rain, winds of 60 to 65 mph (97 to 105 km/h)r) and gusts of up to 85 mph (137 km/h) strikes. Shortly thereafter, it encounters a severe downdraft that causes it to crash in a wooded area, killing all 11 people on board.
- April 30 – Six aircraft from the U.S. Navy aircraft carrier USS Princeton (CV-37) attack the Hwachon Dam, attempting to destroy its sluice gates to prevent North Korea from shutting them and allowing the Pukhan River below to dry up so that North Korean and Chinese troops could cross the riverbed. Dropping one 2,000-pound (910 kg) bomb each, they punch a hole in the dam but miss the sluice gates.

=== May ===
- May 1 – The only combat use of torpedoes during the Korean War occurs when U.S. Navy AD Skyraiders of Attack Squadron 195 (VA-195) from USS Princeton (CV-37), escorted by F4U Corsairs of Fighter Squadrons 192 and 193 (VF-192 and VF-193) from the same carrier, attack the Hwachon Dam with torpedoes, wrecking the center sluice gate and flooding the Pukhan River. All aircraft return safely. It is the only occasion on which naval aircraft have used torpedoes to attack a dam. No aerial torpedo attack has been conducted by any country since.
- May 6 – Air Vietnam, the national flag carrier of South Vietnam, is founded.
- May 11 – Flying a de Havilland Vampire over a 100-kilometer (62-mile) closed circuit between Istres and Avignon, France, French aviator Jacqueline Auriol sets a women's world speed record of 818.18 km/h (508.39 mph). She will win the first of her four Harmon Trophies for the flight.
- May 20 – U.S. Air Force Captain James Jabara becomes the first fighter ace to score his five victories in a jet (an F-86 Sabre) against jets (Mikoyan-Gurevich MiG-15s).
- May 25 – No. 101 Squadron takes delivery of its first English Electric Canberra B.Mk 2 bombers, becoming the first operational Canberra unit and the first jet bomber squadron of Royal Air Force Bomber Command.
- May 29 – Flying the privately owned P-51 Mustang Excalibur III, U.S. Navy Captain Charles F. Blair, Jr., makes the first solo flight over the North Pole, flying nonstop 3,260 miles (5,250 km) from Bardufoss, Norway, to Fairbanks, Alaska.
- May 31 – Roosevelt Field closes. The historic airfield outside Mineola, New York, had opened in 1916.

=== June ===
- The United States Air Force takes delivery of its first F-84G Thunderjet, the first fighter with a built-in aerial refueling probe, the first single-seat aircraft capable of carrying a nuclear bomb, and the last straight-wing aircraft to enter U.S. Air Force service.
- June 1 – British European Airways commences helicopter services between London and Birmingham
- June 5 – The U.S. Air Force, Navy, and Marine Corps begin Operation Strangle, a day-and-night air interdiction campaign against enemy roads, bridges, and tunnels across the width of the Korean Peninsula between 38 degrees 15 minutes North and 39 degrees 15 minutes North. It will continue until February 1952, but without the success hoped for it.
- June 9 – Freddie Bosworth, the founder of Gulf Aviation, the forerunner of Gulf Air, is killed during a demonstration flight at Croydon, England, while preparing for the introduction of the de Havilland Dove into service with the airline.
- June 20
  - The first aircraft with variable-sweep wings, the Bell X-5, makes its first flight, at Edwards Air Force Base, California. No attempt is made to change the sweep of its wings during the flight.
  - The first aircraft completely designed and built in Canada, the first example of the Avro Canada CF-100 Canuck Mark 2, flies for the first time.
- June 22 – The Pan American World Airways Lockheed L-049 Constellation Clipper Great Republic, operating as Flight 151, crashes into a hill near Sanoyie, Liberia, killing all 40 people on board.
- June 29 – A Jat Airways Amiot AAC-1 Toucan (registration YU-ACE) crashes near Rijeka in the Socialist Federal Republic of Yugoslavia, killing all 14 people on board.
- June 30 – The Douglas DC-6 Mainliner Overland Trail, operating as United Airlines Flight 610, crashes into Crystal Mountain, 50 miles (80 km) north-northwest of Denver, Colorado, killing all 50 people on board.

=== July ===
- The world's first trials of a steam catapult take place aboard the British aircraft carrier HMS Perseus.
- No. 25 Squadron Royal Air Force becomes the world's first jet night-fighter squadron when it takes delivery of the de Havilland Vampire NF10 night fighter.
- Covered by the British light cruiser Kenya and frigate HMS Cardigan Bay (K630), a U.S. Navy landing craft equipped with a special crane recovers the pieces of a MiG-15 that had crashed near Cho-do in northwestern Korea.
- Pacific Southwest Airlines expands its route structure for the first time, adding service to San Francisco, California, from San Diego and Burbank.
- July 3 – United States Navy Lieutenant junior grade John K. Koelsch and his crewman, Aviation Mate Third Class George M. Neal, are shot down in an HO3S helicopter by enemy ground fire while trying to rescue United States Marine Corps Captain James V. Wilkins, who had been shot down behind enemy lines and was badly burned. Koelsch and Neal rig a litter to carry Wilkins out of the area, but eventually are captured on July 12, and Koelsch dies on October 16, 1951, while in captivity. For his actions, Koelsch posthumously becomes the first helicopter pilot to receive the Medal of Honor.
- July 6 – Aerial refueling is used under combat conditions for the first time, with a KB-29 Superfortress tanker refueling four RF-80 Shooting Star reconnaissance aircraft over North Korea
- July 12 – A Lóide Aéreo Nacional Douglas C-47B-13-DK Skytrain (registration PP-LPG) abandons a landing attempt in adverse weather at Aracaju Airport in Aracaju, Brazil, overflies the runway, and crashes after beginning a right turn, killing all 33 people on board. At the time, it is the second-deadliest aviation accident in Brazilian history and the third-deadliest worldwide involving any variant of the Douglas DC-3.
- July 16 – A Qantas de Havilland Australia DHA-3 Drover passenger flight from Wau to Lae, with a stop at Bulolo, crashes into the Huon Gulf on approach to Lae Nadzab Airport, killing all 7 occupants. The investigation determined the crash was caused by a structural failure which caused the pilot to lose control of the aircraft.
- July 21 – Flying in heavy rain, icing conditions, and limited visibility, the Canadian Pacific Air Lines Douglas DC-4 CF-CPC disappears during a United Nations flight from Vancouver, British Columbia, Canada, to Anchorage, Territory of Alaska, in the United States with 37 people on board. No wreckage or bodies are ever found.
- July 27 – Flying from Edwards Air Force Base, California, on its fifth flight, the first aircraft with variable-sweep wings, the Bell X-5, changes the sweep of its wings in flight for the first time.
- July 29 – A Curtiss C-46A-10-CU Commando which Loide Aéreo Nacional had just purchased from Lloyd Aéreo Boliviano crashes soon after takeoff from Jorge Wilstermann Airport in Cochabamba, Bolivia, for a flight to Santos Dumont Airport in Rio de Janeiro, Brazil, killing all seven people on board.

=== August ===
- The Royal Navy's first operational jet aircraft squadron, No. 800 Squadron, takes delivery of its first jets, Supermarine Attackers.
- The Canadian Blue Devils aerobatic team is disbanded.
- August 1 – Japan Air Lines is formed.
- August 7 – Bill Bridgeman sets a new airspeed record in the Douglas Skyrocket of Mach 1.88 (1,245 mph (2,004 km/h).
- August 15
  - Bill Bridgeman sets a new altitude record in the Douglas Skyrocket of 74,494 ft (22,706 m).
  - British European Airways commences the world's first turboprop freight services using a modified Douglas DC-3 fitted with two Rolls-Royce Dart engines.
- August 22 – The aircraft carrier USS Essex (CV-9) joins Task Force 77 off the northeast coast of Korea. Embarked aboard Essex is Fighter Squadron 172 (VF-172), equipped with F2H-2 Banshee fighters. It is the first deployment of the Banshee to a war zone.
- August 24 – United Airlines Flight 615, a Douglas DC-6B, crashes into Tolman Peak near Decoto, California, killing all 50 people on board.
- August 25 – For the first time in the Korean War, U.S. Navy fighters escort U.S. Air Force B-29 Superfortress bombers as F9F Panthers of Fighter Squadron 51 (VF-51) and F2H-2 Banshees of Fighter Squadron 172 (VF-172) from the aircraft carrier USS Essex (CV-9) cover B-29s on a raid on Rashin, Korea. They encounter no enemy aircraft.
- August 26 – Canadian National Hockey League player Bill Barilko of the Toronto Maple Leafs and his dentist, Henry Hudson, disappear while flying back to Toronto in a Fairchild 24 floatplane from a weekend fishing trip on the Seal River in northern Ontario, Canada. The wreckage of their plane will not be found until June 1962, when a helicopter pilot discovers it about 100 kilometers (62 miles) north of Cochrane, Ontario, about 56 kilometers (35 miles) off course.

=== September ===
- September 8 – A VASP Douglas C-47B-20-DK Skytrain (registration PP-SPQ) strikes a house immediately after takeoff from Congonhas Airport in São Paulo, Brazil, and crashes, killing all 10 people on board and three people on the ground.
- September 12 – A Société de Transports Aériens Alpes Provence (STAAP) Douglas DC-3 (registration F-BEIZ) disappears over the Mediterranean Sea in adverse weather during a flight from Perpignan Airport in France to Oran Es Sénia Airport in French Algeria with the loss of all 39 people on board. Wreckage is discovered in the water 132 kilometers (82 miles) west of Palma de Mallorc, Mallorca, four days later. At the time, it is the deadliest aviation accident to occur over the Mediterranean Sea and the deadliest accident involving any variant of the Douglas DC-3 worldwide.
- September 13
  - The United States Marine Corps's first transport helicopter squadron, Marine Transport Helicopter Squadron 161 (HMR-161), conducts history's first mass helicopter resupply mission in Operation Windmill I, lifting 18,484 pounds (8,384 kg) of equipment to a U.S. Marine Corps battalion on the front line in Korea and evacuating 74 casualties, all in one hour, using Sikorsky HRS-1 helicopters.
  - In Operation Windmill II, Marine Transport Helicopter Squadron 161 (HMR-161) lifts 12,180 pounds (5,520 kg) of equipment to a U.S. Marine Corps unit on the front line in Korea in 18 flights over the course of one hour, using Sikorsky HRS-1 helicopters.
- September 15 – A stunt plane piloted by United States Air Force First Lieutenant Norman Jones crashes into the crowd at the Fall Festival Day air show in Flagler, Colorado, when Jones attempts a loop or slow roll (sources differ) from an altitude of 200 feet (61 meters). Jones, six other adults, and 13 children die in the second-deadliest air show accident in U.S. history.
- September 16 – A damaged United States Navy F2H-2 Banshee attempting to land on USS Essex (CV-9) crashes into a group of aircraft parked on the carrier's deck, killing seven sailors.
- September 17 – A Real Transportes Aéreos Douglas C-47-DL Skytrain (registration PP-YPX) disappears during a domestic flight in Brazil from Santos Dumont Airport in Rio de Janeiro to Congonhas Airport in São Paulo with the loss of all 10 people on board. Its wreckage is discovered two days later near Ubatuba.
- September 21 – In Operation Summit, the U.S. Marine Corps makes the world's first mass combat deployment by helicopter, when Marine Transport Helicopter Squadron 161 (HMR-161) uses 12 Sikorsky HRS-1 helicopters to land 224 or 228 U.S. Marines and 17,772 pounds (8,061 kg) of equipment onto Hill 844 near Kansong, Korea.
- September 27
  - In Operation Blackbird, the U.S. Marine Corps makes the world's first nighttime combat troop lift by helicopter and the only large-scale night helicopter lift of the Korean War, when Marine Transport Helicopter Squadron 161 (HMR-161) uses Sikorsky HRS-1 helicopters to land 223 U.S. Marines in a landing zone in Korea in 2 hours 20 minutes.
  - A U.S. Air Force Curtiss C-46D-10-CU Commando crashes into Japan's Mount Tanazawa, killing all 14 people on board.
- September 28 – The U.S. Marine Corps loses a transport helicopter operationally for the first time in history when a Sikorsky HRS-1 of Marine Transport Helicopter Squadron 161 (HMR-161) is destroyed in a crash during a night training flight in Korea. All three men on board escape without injury.
- September 30 – The Douglas Aircraft Company rolls out the X-3 Stiletto supersonic research aircraft at its plant in Santa Monica, California.

=== October ===
- Based on information supplied by Korean guerrillas, eight AD Skyraiders from U.S. Navy Fighter Squadron 54 (VF-54) attack a meeting place of Communist leaders in Kapsan, North Korea, with 1,000-pound (450 kg) bombs and napalm. Intelligence evaluation indicates that 500 Communists are killed.
- A U.S. Navy helicopter from the battleship USS Iowa (BB-61) flies 10 miles (16 km) inland to rescue a downed pilot from the aircraft carrier USS Bon Homme Richard (CV-31), a very lengthy rescue mission for the time.
- Communist aircraft inflict significant damage on the Royal Navy frigate HMS Black Swan while she is operating in the Han River in Korea.
- October 3 – Helicopter Antisubmarine Squadron 1 (HS-1), the U.S. Navy's first anti-submarine warfare helicopter squadron, is commissioned.
- October 8 – An Aero Transportes SA Douglas C-47A-30-DK Skytrain (registration XA-GOR) crashes into the mountain Cerro Blanco in Mexico during a domestic flight from Mexico City to Minatitlán, killing all 10 people on board.
- October 11 – In Operation Bumble Bee, 12 Sikorsky HRS-1 helicopters of Marine Transport Helicopter Squadron 161 (HMR-161) relieve an entire U.S. Marine Corps battalion on the front line in Korea, with each helicopter carrying six Marines at a time 15 miles (24 km) to the front and bringing six Marines at a time out to the rear area on the return trip. In under six hours, they transport a total of 958 Marines.
- October 15
  - In Operation Wedge, Sikorsky HRS-1 helicopters of the U.S. Marine Corps's Marine Transport Helicopter Squadron 161 (HMR-161) supply a surrounded South Korean Army unit with 19,000 pounds (8,600 kg) of ammunition and evacuate 24 casualties.
  - During a domestic flight in South Africa from Port Elizabeth to Durban, a South African Airways Douglas C-47A-1-DK Skytrain (registration ZS-AVJ) crashes into Mount Ingeli, killing all 17 people on board.
  - A United States Air Force Boeing C-97A Stratofreighter disappears over the North Atlantic Ocean during a flight from Lajes Field in the Azores to Westover Air Force Base in Massachusetts, with the loss of all 12 people on board.
- October 17
  - The pilot and copilot of a JAT Douglas DC-3 making a domestic flight in the Socialist Federal Republic of Yugoslavia from Ljubljana to Beograd instead land the airliner at Zürich, Switzerland, where they request political asylum for themselves and members of their families who are aboard the plane as passengers.
  - During a domestic night flight in British Columbia, Canada, in adverse weather conditions, Queen Charlotte Airlines Flight 102-17 – a Consolidated Canso A flying boat (registration CF-FOQ) flying from Kildala to Vancouver – crashes into Mount Benson on Vancouver Island, killing all 23 people on board. The post-crash investigation finds that the pilot made a major navigational error and probably mistook Nanaimo for Vancouver, leading him to fly into the mountain.
- October 18 – The Government of Colombia changes the name of Colombia′s national civil aviation authority from the Directorate General of Civil Aeronautics to the National Department of Civil Aeronautics and resubordinates it from the Ministry of War to the Ministry of Public Works.
- October 22
  - In Operation Bushbeater, the U.S. Marine Corps makes the first use of vertical envelopment tactics when patrol teams of the 1st Marine Division use 40-foot (12-meter)-long knotted ropes to descend from Sikorsky HRS-1 helicopters of Marine Transport Helicopter Squadron 161 (HMR-161) in Korea. Two of the helicopters lose lift over rough terrain and crash, but no one aboard is injured.
  - During a domestic flight in the Socialist Federal Republic of Yugoslavia from Beograd to Skopje, a Jat Airways Douglas C-47A-20-DK Skytrain (registration YU-ACC) crashes near Skopje, killing 12 people.
- October 23 – Ten U.S. Air Force Boeing B-29 Superfortresses attack an airfield in North Korea; three are shot down, four make emergency landings in South Korea, and three badly damaged aircraft return to Okinawa. It is the last daylight combat mission flown by the B-29.
- October 25 – Japan Airlines launches commercial operations within Japan, using three Northwest Airlines Martin 2-0-2 aircraft flown by Northwest crews.
- October 27 – Just after takeoff from Santa Elena Airport in Flores, Guatemala, a cabin fire breaks out aboard a Guatemalan Air Force Douglas C-47 Skytrain (registration FAG0961) carrying 25 radio reporters to a military event. The aircraft crashes, killing 26 of the 28 people on board.

=== November ===
- A Royal Navy de Havilland Sea Hornet N.F. 21 night fighter of No. 809 Squadron, Fleet Air Arm, flies nonstop from Gibraltar to Lee-on-Solent, England, at an average speed of 378 miles per hour (608 km/h).
- Thanks to wartime mobilization of United States Naval Reserve aviators, 75 percent of U.S. Navy Korean War sorties are being flown by Naval Reserve personnel.
- November 5 – Transocean Air Lines Flight 5763, a Martin 2-0-2 (N93039) with 29 people aboard, crashes in fog at Tucumcari Municipal Airport outside Tucumcari, New Mexico, killing one person.
- November 12 – The Uruguayan airline PLUNA becomes wholly owned by the Government of Uruguay.
- November 13 – Flying at 6,000 feet (1,829 meters) rather than the planned 8,000 feet (2,438 meters), a United States Air Force Fairchild C-82A-FA Packet drifts off course in poor weather during a flight from Rhein-Main Air Base in West Germany to Bordeaux-Mérignac Airport in France and crashes into Mount Dore southwest of Clermont-Ferrand, France, killing all 36 people on board. It is the deadliest accident in history involving any variant of the C-82.
- November 15 – After a LOT Polish Airlines Lisunov Li-2P (registration SP-LKA) experiences engine trouble, its pilot decides not to take off from Łódź-Lublinek Airport in Łódź, Poland, for a flight to Kraków. Officers of the Polish government's Department of Security force him to take off anyway, and the plane crashes southeast of the airport soon after takeoff, killing all 18 people on board.
- November 17 – An Overseas National Airways (ONA) Douglas DC-4 (N79992) on a training flight collided with a California Eastern Airways DC-4 (N4002B) near Oakland Airport, Oakland, California, while both aircraft were on instrument check flights with hoods installed in the left-hand side of the cockpits. The collision resulted in the destruction of the ONA DC-4 and death of all three pilots aboard it and damage to the California Eastern aircraft but no deaths to those two pilots. Investigators determined that the cause of the collision was the failure of the training pilot and, in the case of California Eastern, the lack of an observer.
- November 21 – A Deccan Airways Douglas C-47A-25-DK Skytrain (registration VT-AUO) flies too low on approach in very poor visibility to Dum Dum Airport in Calcutta, India, strikes trees, and crashes, killing 16 of the 17 people on board.
- November 27 – A Lineas Aéreas Unidas SA Douglas DC-2-243 (registration XA-DOQ) collides with an unidentified object during a night takeoff from San Luis Acatlán, Mexico, and crashes, catching fire. The crash and fire kill 13 of the 20 people on board.
- November 30 – On a single mission, U.S. Air Force F-86 Sabre pilot George A. Davis, Jr., attacks nine Tupolev Tu-2 (NATO reporting name "Bat") bombers over the mouth of the Yalu River and shoots down three of them in three passes, then shoots down a MiG-15 over Korea Bay that had been pursuing another F-86 and lands at Kimpo Airport with only five U.S. gallons (4.2 Imperial gallons; 19 liters) of fuel remaining. The four kills make him the fifth U.S. ace of the Korean War. With seven kills of Japanese aircraft during World War II, he becomes the first U.S. pilot to become an ace in two wars. The day's victories also make him a double ace and an ace in both piston-engine aircraft and jet, and losses among the Tu-2 formation prompt the Chinese Air Force to abandon bombing raids for the rest of the Korean War.

=== December ===
- A United States Air Force Republic XF-91 Thunderceptor becomes the first American combat aircraft to break the sound barrier in level flight.
- December 1 – Flying Officer Bruce Gogerly of No. 77 Squadron, Royal Australian Air Force (RAAF), flying a Gloster Meteor, shoots down a Soviet-piloted MiG-15, the first of four air-to-air kills for RAAF pilots during the Korean War.
- December 6 – A U.S. Air Force Douglas C-47A-65-DL Skytrain crashes into the Sainte-Baume ridge east of Marseille, France, killing all 10 people on board. Its wreckage is found two days later.
- December 12 – Alaska Air becomes the first airline to fly over the North Pole.
- December 13 – U.S. Air Force Major George Davis of the 334th Fighter Squadron shoots down four MiG-15s in a single day.
- December 16 – A fire breaks out in the right engine nacelle of a Miami Airline Curtiss C-46F-1-CU Commando (registration N1678M) as it takes off from Newark Airport. As the plane attempts to return to the airport, it strikes a vacant house and a brick storage building in Elizabeth, New Jersey, and comes to rest inverted and partially submerged in shallow water along the bank of the Elizabeth River, after which a severe gasoline fire breaks out and spreads to the brick building. The crash and fire kill all 56 people on board and seriously injure one person on the ground. At the time, it is the second-deadliest aviation accident in United States history and the second-deadliest accident involving any variant of the C-46.
- December 22 – Arriving at Mehrabad Airport in Tehran, Iran, in a snowstorm, a Misrair SNCASE SE.161 Languedoc (registration SU-AHH) circles the airport twice and then crashes west of it, killing all 22 people on board.
- December 27 – An Aeroflot Lisunov Li-2 runs out of fuel and makes a forced landing in a clearing in the Soviet Union near Namtsev in the Russian Soviet Federated Socialist Republic 90 kilometers (56 miles) from Yakutsk. It strikes trees, crashes, and catches fire, killing all 20 people on board.
- December 28 – The U.S. Joint Intelligence Committee reports that in an offensive against North Atlantic Treaty Organization (NATO) forces, the Soviet Union would employ over 20,000 aircraft, which would be capable of attacking Western Europe, Scandinavia, Italy, the Balkans, Turkey, the Middle East, Canada, and the United States.
- December 29 – Flying at low altitude in instrument meteorological conditions so its crew can maintain visual reference with the ground, a Continental Charters Curtiss C-46A-50-CU Commando on a charter flight from Pittsburgh, Pennsylvania, to Buffalo, New York, strays off course and crashes into a wooded hill near Little Valley, New York, killing 26 of the 40 people on board.
- December 30
  - A U.S. Air Force Douglas VC-47D Skytrain crashes in mountainous terrain 56 kilometers (35 miles) north of Globe, Arizona, killing all 28 people on board.
  - Transocean Air Lines Flight 501, a Curtiss C-46 Commando (N68963), crashes near Fairbanks in the Territory of Alaska, killing all four passengers and crew on board. The plane's wreckage is found on January 3, 1952. Investigators determine that the crash occurred due to spatial disorientation caused by pilot error.
- December 31 – The U.S. Air Force's Strategic Air Command has an inventory of 1,165 aircraft, including 658 bombers.

== First flights ==
=== January ===
- January 3 – Brochet MB.100
- January 23 – Douglas XF4D-1, prototype of the Douglas F4D Skyray

=== February ===
- February 6 – Valmet Vihuri
- February 12 – Piaggio P.148
- February 14 – Republic F-84F Thunderstreak
- February 23 – Dassault Mystère

=== March ===
- March 7 – Fouga Gemeaux I
- March 12 – Fairey Delta 1
- March 15 – SNCASO SO.4000
- March 15 – Sud-Ouest SO.30R Bellatrix
- March 20 – McCulloch MC-4

=== April ===
- April 21 – Chase XC-123A
- April 26 – Lockheed X-7

=== May ===
- May – Hispano Aviación HA-1112-K1L
- May 18
  - Fokker S.14 Machtrainer
  - Vickers Valiant prototype WB210

=== June ===
- June 12 – Max Holste MH.152
- June 20 – Bell X-5, first aircraft with swing wings
- June 21 – Handley Page HP.88

=== July ===
- Cessna 308
- July 16 – Iberavia I-11
- July 20 – Hawker Hunter prototype WB188
- July 31 – SNCASE SE.3120 Alouette

=== August ===
- August 4 – Breguet Vultur
- August 5 – HAL HT-2, India's first indigenously designed basic trainer.
- August 5 – Supermarine Swift WJ960
- August 7 – McDonnell F3H Demon 125444
- August 10 – Short Sperrin
- August 31 – Supermarine Type 508 VX133

=== September ===
- September 7 – Auster B.4 G-AMKL
- September 20 – Grumman XF9F-6, prototype of the Grumman F9F-6, later F-9, Cougar
- September 26 – de Havilland Sea Vixen WG326

=== October ===
- October 4 – Brochet MB.80
- October 5 – Convair CV-340

=== November ===
- November 10 — Cantinieau C.100
- November 26 – Gloster Javelin prototype WD804

=== December ===
- December 10 – Fiat G.80, Italy's first true jet
- December 10 – Kaman K-225, first turbine-powered helicopter
- December 12 – de Havilland Canada DHC-3 Otter prototype CF-DYK-X
- December 27 – North American XFJ-2B, prototype of the FJ-2 Fury

== Entered service ==
=== January ===
- January 24 – British European Airways introduces the Pionair (a Douglas DC-3 modified by Scottish Aviation) into service.

=== February ===
- Avro Shackleton with No. 120 Squadron, Royal Air Force Coastal Command, and No. 236 Operational Conversion Unit, Royal Air Force.

=== May ===
- May 24 – English Electric Canberra with the Royal Air Force's No. 101 Squadron

=== June ===
- Northrop F-89 Scorpion with the United States Air Force′s 84th Fighter-Interceptor Squadron
- June 20 – Avro Canada CF-100 Canuck Mark 2

=== July ===
- de Havilland Vampire NF10 with the Royal Air Force's No. 25 Squadron.

=== August ===
- Gloster Meteor NF11 with the Royal Air Force's No. 29 Squadron
- August 22 – Supermarine Attacker with 800 Naval Air Squadron, the Fleet Air Arm's first jet

=== October ===
- October 17 – Avro Canada CF-100 Canuck with the Royal Canadian Air Force

=== December ===
- December 17 – Lockheed Super Constellation with Eastern Air Lines
- December 28 – Grumman F9F Cougar with the United States Navy
- December 31 – Fauvel AV.36

== Retirements ==
- June – Saunders-Roe SR.A/1 by the Royal Air Force′s Marine Aircraft Experimental Establishment
