= Brochet MB.120 =

1950s French light aircraft prototype

MB.120

General information
- Type: Sports plane
- Manufacturer: Brochet
- Designer: Maurice Brochet
- Number built: 1

History
- First flight: 5 April 1954

The Brochet MB.120 was a two-seat light aircraft developed in France in the 1950s.

== Design and development ==
A derivative of the Brochet MB.70 family, combining the wing of the MB.80 with a modified fuselage of the MB.100 seating two. The design never progressed past a single prototype.

== Specifications ==
Data from Jane's All the World's Aircraft 1956–57

General characteristics

- Crew: 1
- Capacity: 1 passenger
- Length: 6.50 m (21 ft 4 in)
- Wingspan: 10.66 m (35 ft 0 in)
- Height: 2.0 m (6 ft 7 in)
- Wing area: 14.7 m^{2} (158 sq ft)
- Empty weight: 505 kg (1,113 lb)
- Gross weight: 765 kg (1,687 lb)
- Powerplant: 1 × Continental C90 air-cooled flat-four engine, 67 kW (90 hp)

Performance

- Maximum speed: 195 km/h (121 mph, 105 kn)
- Cruise speed: 170 km/h (110 mph, 92 kn)
- Range: 800 km (500 mi, 430 nmi)
- Service ceiling: 5,000 m (16,000 ft)
- Wing loading: 52 kg/m^{2} (11 lb/sq ft)
