= Brochet MB.50 =

1940s French light aircraft

MB.50 Pipistrelle
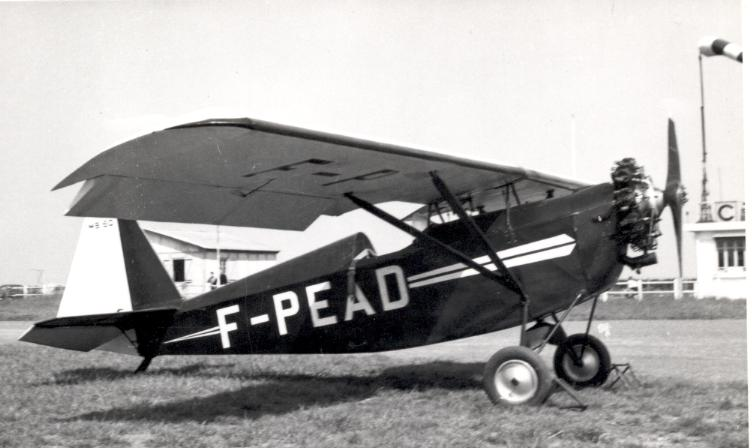
- Brochet MB.50 Pipistrelle at Chavenay airfield near Paris in May 1957

General information
- Type: Ultralight
- National origin: France
- Manufacturer: Brochet for homebuilding
- Designer: Maurice Brochet

History
- First flight: 1947

The Brochet MB.50 Pipistrelle (named for the Pipistrelle bat) is a French-built light sporting aircraft of the late 1940s.

== Design and development ==
Maurice Brochet had designed the MB.30 parasol light aircraft and the MB.40 cabin two-seater before World War Two. His first postwar design was the MB.50 Pipistrelle ("Bat") of 1947, which first flew that year. It is a single-seat open-cockpit ultra-light aircraft with a pylon-mounted high wing, wooden fuselage frame and fabric covering. The design was kept simple with the amateur-built market, using factory working drawings, in mind.

The first MB.50 was built in 1947 by Maurice Brochet and was powered by a Salmson 9ADb 45 h.p. radial engine. The subsequent Pipistrelles were all built by amateur constructors. In 1965, six were active, three powered by the Salmson, two by the Beaussier 4Bm O2 of 45 h.p. and one fitted with a Zlín Persy II. Maurice Brochet formed Constructions Aeronautiques Maurice Brochet and designed the MB.60 Barbastrelle tandem two-seat high-wing monoplane which first flew in June 1949.

== Surviving aircraft ==
Pipistrelle F-PEBZ was still active in 2005. Another was held in the collection of Ailes Ancienne Toulouse, near Toulouse Blagnac International Airport, during 2006.

== Specifications ==
Data from Green 1965, p.38

General characteristics

- Crew: One pilot
- Length: 5.80 m (16 ft 0 in)
- Wingspan: 8.00 m (26 ft 3 in)
- Empty weight: 240 kg (529 lb)
- Gross weight: 351 kg (772 lb)
- Powerplant: 1 × Salmson 9ADb , 30 kW (45 hp)

Performance

- Maximum speed: 140 km/h (87 mph, 76 kn)
- Cruise speed: 115 km/h (72 mph, 63 kn)
