= Brochet MB.110 =

1950s French light aircraft

MB.110
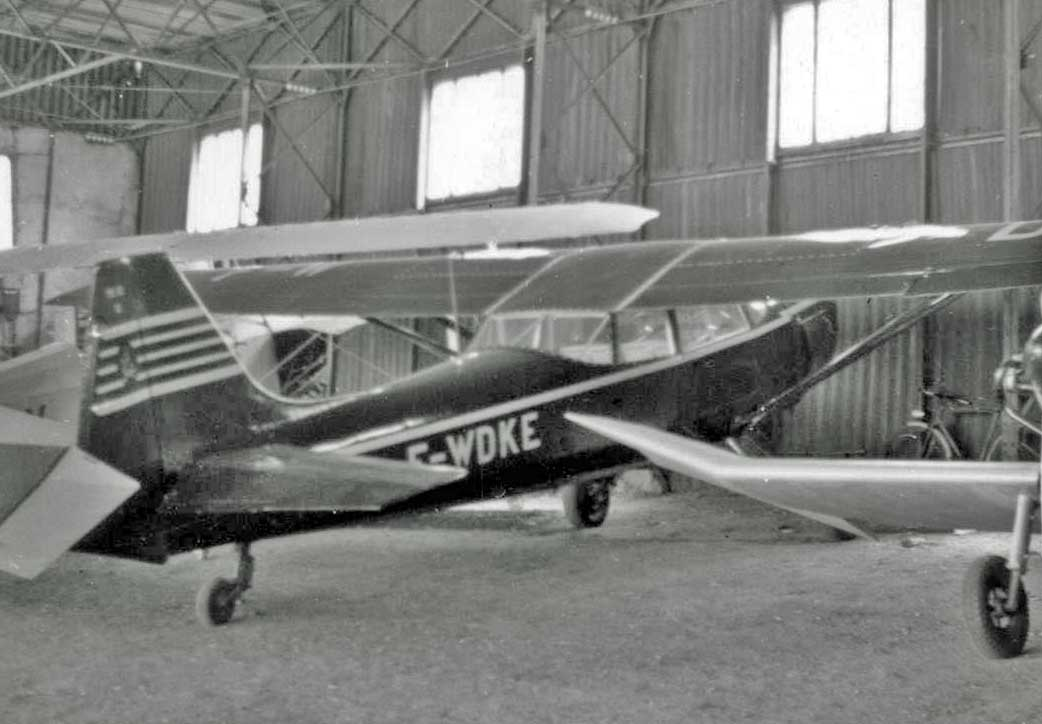
- The prototype Brochet MB.110 at Chavenay airfield near Paris in 1957

General information
- Type: Sports plane
- Manufacturer: Brochet
- Designer: Maurice Brochet
- Number built: 2

History
- First flight: 12 March 1956

The Brochet MB.110 was a four-seat light aircraft developed in France in the early 1950s.

== Design and development ==
A further derivative of the Brochet MB.70 family, generally similar to those aircraft, the MB.110 was a substantially new and enlarged design. Apart from a bigger passenger cabin with one more seat than previous models, the wing and tail were redesigned, and a more powerful engine was fitted. Two examples were built. The prototype aircraft first flew at Chavenay-Villepreux airfield near Paris on 12 March 1956.

== Specifications ==
Data from Jane's All the World's Aircraft 1956–57

General characteristics

- Crew: 1
- Capacity: 3 passengers
- Length: 7.68 m (25 ft 2 in)
- Wingspan: 11.06 m (36 ft 3 in)
- Height: 2.56 m (8 ft 5 in)
- Wing area: 15.65 m^{2} (168.5 sq ft)
- Aspect ratio: 7.8:1
- Airfoil: Göttingen 634
- Empty weight: 800 kg (1,764 lb)
- Gross weight: 1,300 kg (2,866 lb)
- Powerplant: 1 × SNECMA-built Regnier 4L air-cooled four-cylinder inline engine, 130 kW (170 hp)
- Propellers: 2-bladed Ratier-Figeac fixed-pitch propeller

Performance

- Maximum speed: 240 km/h (150 mph, 130 kn)
- Cruise speed: 200 km/h (120 mph, 110 kn)
- Range: 1,600 km (1,000 mi, 870 nmi)
