= Brochet MB.60 =

1940s French light aircraft

MB.60 Barbastelle

General information
- Type: Work plane
- National origin: France
- Manufacturer: Brochet
- Designer: Maurice Brochet
- Number built: 1

History
- First flight: 24 June 1949

The Brochet MB.60 Barbastelle was a French two-seater work plane built by Maurice Brochet in the late 1940s.

== Design and development ==
The MB.60 was a high-wing monoplane with a closed cabin. Although a two seater like the Brochet MB.50, it was distinguished by an airfoil without sweep-back, a raised upper deck of the rear fuselage and a fixed landing gear with split axle. Power came from a 83 horsepower Salmson 5-cylinder radial engine.

The only MB.60 to be completed (registered F-BFKT) took to the air on 24 June 1949 in Chavenay, piloted by André Deschamps. In the following July it was subjected to glider towing tests and presented in August at the 2nd National RSA rally before passing the certification tests. With Brochet working on the Brochet MB.70, the sole MB.60 was sold to a flying club and used as a glider tug. By the end of 1951 it had totaled 2,000 cycles.

== Specifications ==
Data from Avions Maurice Brochet Neauphle Le Chateau

General characteristics

- Crew: 1
- Capacity: 1 passenger
- Length: 5.80 m (19 ft 0 in)
- Wingspan: 8.0 m (26 ft 3 in)
- Wing area: 9.40 m^{2} (101.2 sq ft)
- Powerplant: 1 × Salmson air-cooled radial engine, 62 kW (83 hp)
