= Flight 610 =

Flight 610 may refer to:

- United Airlines Flight 610, crashed on 30 June 1951
- Iberia Airlines Flight 610, crashed on 19 February 1985
- Lion Air Flight 610, crashed on 29 October 2018
