= Leopoldoff Colibri =

French-built light sporting and trainer biplane

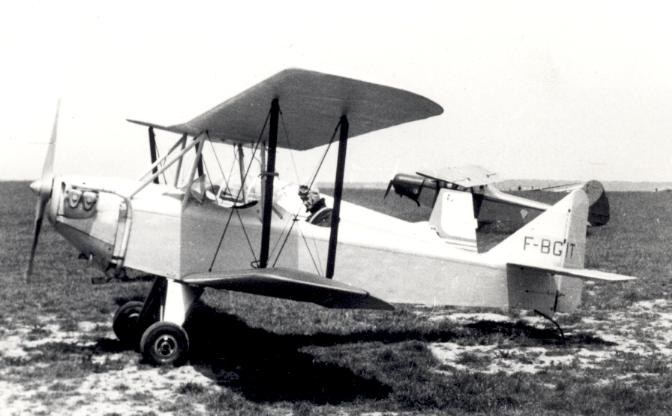
- Leopoldoff L.6 Colibri at Chavenay near Paris in 1967

General information
- Type: Flight training and sporting aircraft
- National origin: France
- Manufacturer: Societe des Avions Leopoldoff
- Designer: M.L. Leopoldoff
- Status: several flying in 2011
- Primary user: private owners and aero clubs
- Number built: 125

History
- Introduction date: 1937
- First flight: 27 September 1933

The Leopoldoff Colibri (English: Hummingbird) is a French-built light sporting and trainer biplane of the 1930s.

== Development ==
The Colibri was designed to meet demand for an economical two-seat tandem training and sporting biplane and the prototype L.3 Colibri, powered by a 35 hp (26 kW) Anzani engine, first flew at Toussus-le-Noble airfield near Paris in September 1933.

Series production of the L.3 Colibri fitted with the 45 hp (34 kW) Salmson 9Adb engine was started in 1937 by Aucouturier-Dugoua & Cie, followed by examples built by the Societe des Avions Leopoldoff, a total of 33 aircraft being completed before World War II.

== Operational history ==
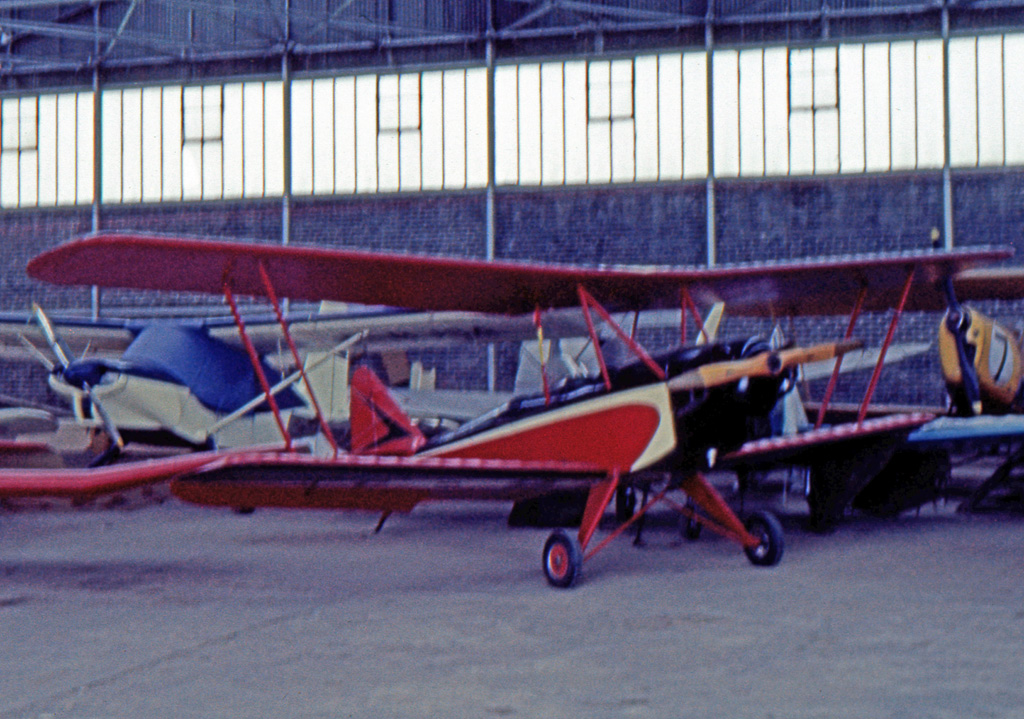
1948-built L.7 fitted with a Continental engine

The Colibris served with aero clubs and private owners prewar, with several surviving the conflict. Production of six further Colibris was undertaken postwar by the Societe des Constructions Aeronautiques du Maroc in Morocco, receiving their designation CAM-1. Various engines were fitted in service, and the aircraft involved received modified type numbers.

In 2011, three Colibris were active in France and two were flying in the United Kingdom.

== Variants ==
L.3 prototype
35 hp (26 kW) Anzani engine (1 built);
L.3 production prewar
45 hp (34 kW) Salmson 9Adb radial engine (33 built);
L.31
L.3 fitted with 50 hp (37 kW) Boitel 5Ao engine;
L.32
L.3 fitted with Walter Mikron III engine;
CAM-1
Colibri built postwar in Morocco (6 aircraft);
L.53
Colibri fitted postwar with 75 hp (56 kW) Minie engine;
L.55
Colibri fitted postwar with 90 hp (67 kW) Continental C90 engine;
L.6
Colibri fitted postwar with Minié 4.DF.28 Horus engine;
L.7
Colibri built postwar and fitted with a Continental A65-8S engine.

== Specifications (L.55 Colibri) ==
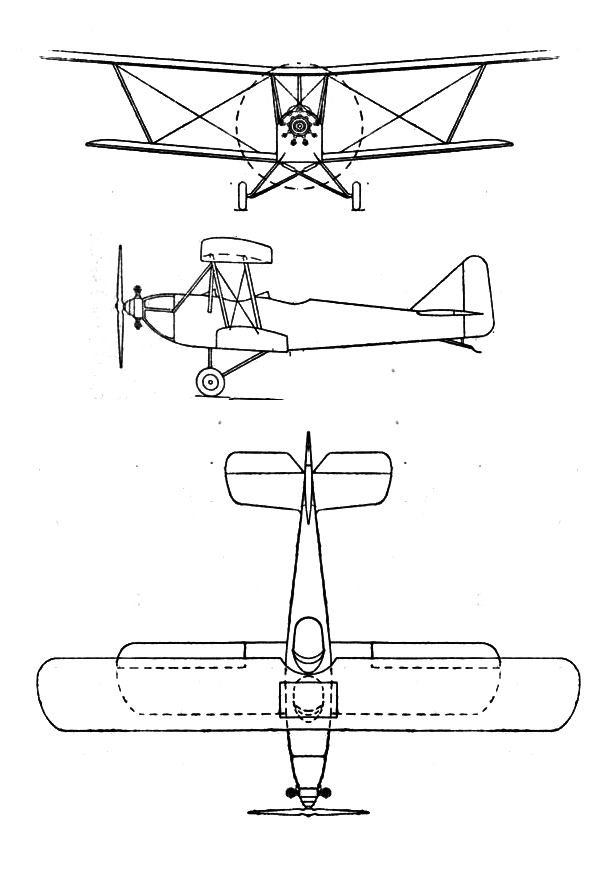
Leopoldoff Colibri 3-view drawing from L'Aerophile February 1938

Data from Airlife's World Aircraft, Aviafrance:Leopoldoff L-7 'Colibri', Aviafrance:Leopoldoff L-3

General characteristics

- Crew: one
- Length: 5.92 m (19 ft 5 in)
- Wingspan: 8.94 m (29 ft 4 in)
- Height: 2.11 m (6 ft 11 in)
- Wing area: 16.5 m^{2} (178 sq ft) (L-7)
- Empty weight: 300 kg (661 lb)
- Gross weight: 520 kg (1,146 lb)
- Powerplant: 1 × Continental C90-12F 4-cylinder air-cooledhorizontally-opposed piston engine, 67 kW (90 hp)
- Propellers: 2-bladed fixed-pitch propeller

Performance

- Maximum speed: 174 km/h (108 mph, 94 kn)
- Cruise speed: 153 km/h (95 mph, 83 kn)
- Range: 451 km (280 mi, 244 nmi)
- Rate of climb: 2.5 m/s (490 ft/min)
- Power/mass: 0.13 kW/kg (0.079 hp/lb)
