= Minié 4.D =

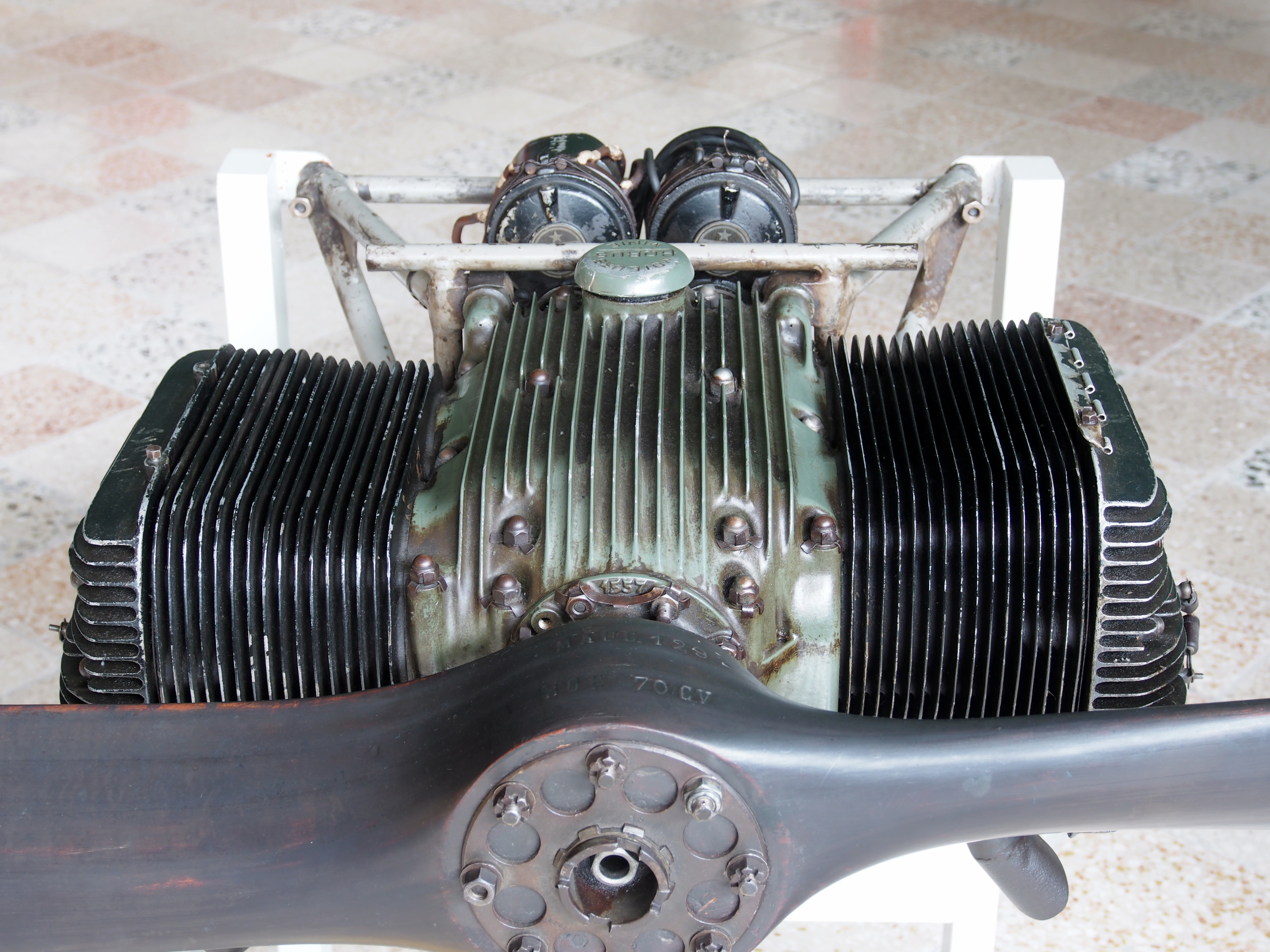
- Minié 4.D4 Horus at the Flugausstellung Peter Junior, showing the early paired cylinder castings.
- Type: Air-cooled flat four piston engines
- National origin: France
- Manufacturer: Établissements Victor Minié

Production of the Minié 4.D series of air-cooled, flat four engines began before World War II and resumed afterwards into the 1950s.

== Design and development ==
Établissements Victor Minié, based in Colombes, only built low power flat-four aircraft engines, always using light alloy castings. Their first three known types, the 1,500 cc (92 cu in) 4 B0 Horus, 1,980 cc (121 cu in) 4 E0 Horus and 2,176 cc (132.8 cu in) 4 E2 Horus, produced only 26 kW (35 hp), 34 kW (46 hp) and 38 kW (51 hp) respectively. The 4 B0 was available with either single or dual ignition but all others had dual ignition.

The 4.D series, also dual ignition engines, were larger and more powerful. Production began in 1938. Halted by the Occupation of France during World War II, it began again in 1946, continuing until the company closed in 1954. Apart from the D4 Horus, all post-war engines had separate head and cylinder castings rather than the pre-war pairs.

The name Horus was used with all Minié's engines from the mid-1930s until 1949.

== Variants ==
Data from Erickson unless noted.

4.D0 Horus
1938. First of D series. Heads and cylinders cast in pairs. Bore/stroke 102 / 91.5 mm (4.02 / 3.60 in), capacity 2,991 cc (182.5 cu in), power 52 kW (70 hp).

4.D4 Horus
1946–1948. Version of 4.D0 with same paired heads and cylinders. Specifications also as 4.D0.

4.DA.25
1946–1953. Separate heads and cylinders. Power 52 kW (70 hp) at 2,430 rpm.

4.DA.28 Horus
1946–1953. Horus name dropped in 1949. Bore/stroke 100 / 91.5 mm (3.94 / 3.60 in), capacity 2,875 cc (175.4 cu in), power 45 kW (60 hp) at 2,450 rpm.

4.DC.32
1949–1953. The most widely used variant in terms of number of applications; more than 150 units built. Bore/stroke 102 / 91.5 mm (4.02 / 3.60 in), capacity 2,991 cc (182.5 cu in), power 56 kW (75 hp) at 2,575 rpm.

4.DF.28
1953–1954. Bore/stroke 100 / 91.5 mm (3.94 / 3.60 in), capacity 2,875 cc (175.4 cu in), power 48 kW (65 hp) at 2,450 rpm.

4.DG.00
1953–1954. Cylinders with hemispherical heads. Bore/stroke 115 / 96 mm (4.5 / 3.8 in), capacity 3,989 cc (243.4 cu in), power 67 kW (90 hp) at 2,250 rpm.

== Applications ==
Data from Erickson unless noted.

4.D4 Horus

- Duverne-Saran 01

4.DA.25 Horus

- Mauboussin M.129

4.DA.28

- Jodel D.114
- Mauboussin M.129/48
- Morane-Saulnier MS.602
- Nord NC.851

4.DC.32

- Adam RA-14 Loisirs
- Bearn GY-201 Minicab
- Brochet MB.71
- Brochet MB.80
- Chatelain AC.5
- Druine Turbi
- Indraéro Aéro 101
- Jodel D.111
- Max Plan PF.204/14 Busard
- Nord NC.853
- SIPA S.901
- SNCASO SO.7055 Deauville
- Starck AS-80 Holiday

4.DF.28

- Leopoldoff L.6 Colibri

== Engines on display ==
- 4.D4 Horus at the Flugausstellung Peter Junior in Hermeskeil, Germany

== Specifications (Minié 4.DC.32) ==
Data from Jane's All the World's Aircraft 1953-54

=== General characteristics ===
- Type: air-cooled flat four
- Bore: 102 mm (4.02 in)
- Stroke: 91.5 mm (3.60 in)
- Displacement: 2.98 L (181.85 cu in)
- Length: 791 mm (31.14 in)
- Width: 860 mm (33.86 in)
- Height: 102 mm (4.02 in)
- Dry weight: 85.5 kg (188 lb)

=== Components ===
- Fuel type: 80 octane
- Oil system: Wet sump

=== Performance ===
- Power output: Take-off, 60 kW (80 hp) at 2610 rpm; cruise, 56 kW (75 hp) at 2,575 rpm
- Compression ratio: 7:1
