= Brochet =

Defunct French aircraft manufacturer

Constructions Aéronautiques Maurice Brochet
- Industry: Aeronautics
- Founded: 1947
- Founder: Maurice Brochet
- Defunct: 1962
- Fate: Defunct
- Headquarters: Neauphle-le-Château, France
- Products: Aircraft

Constructions Aéronautiques Maurice Brochet was a French manufacturer of light aircraft established by Maurice Brochet (18 June 1899 – 16 June 1969) in Neauphle-le-Château in 1947.

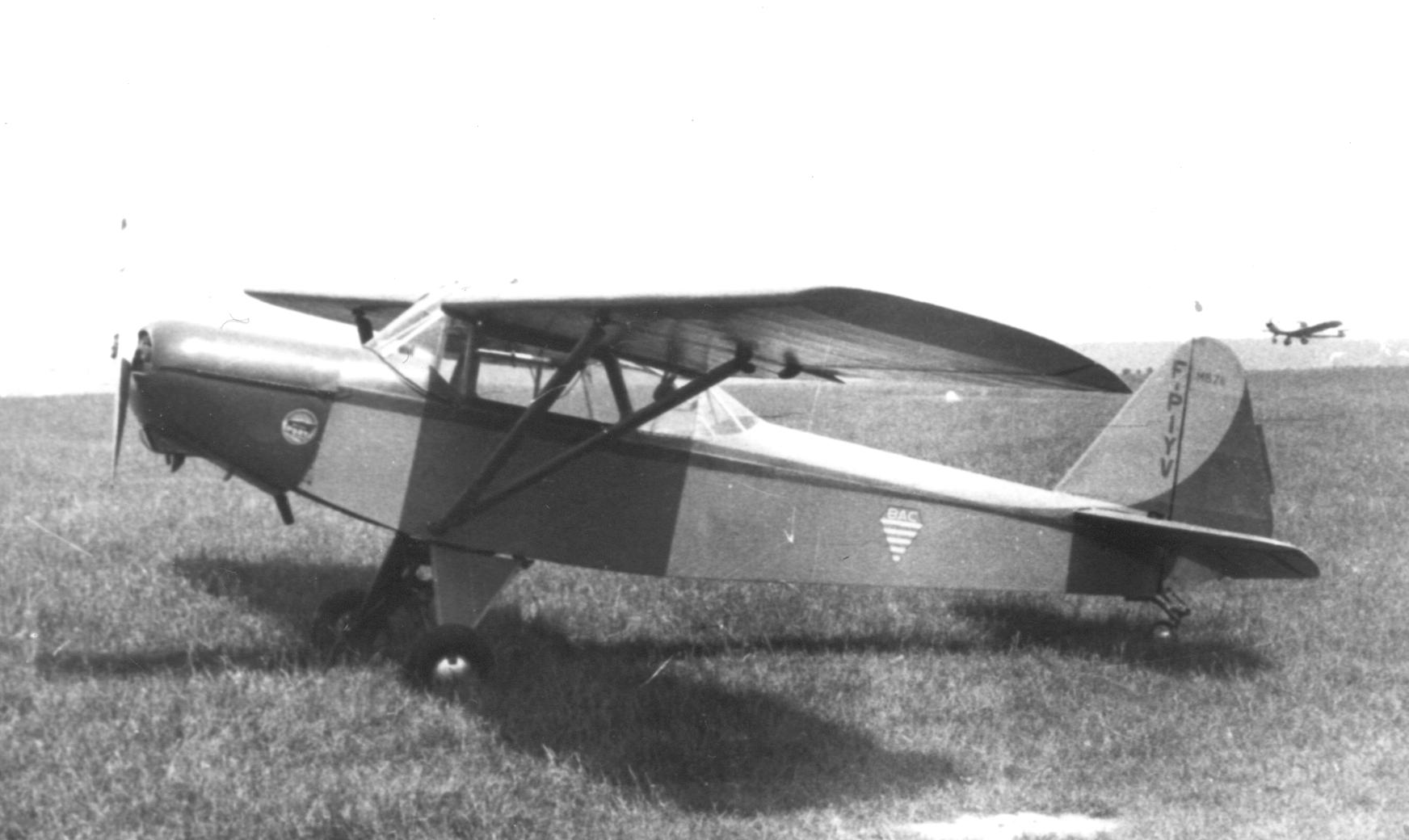
Brochet MB.76 at Chavenay airfield near Paris in 1967

== Aircraft design and construction ==
Initially, the firm sold plans for light aircraft of Brochet's own designs to amateur constructors, but gradually undertook more and more aircraft construction, with its final designs not marketed for homebuilding at all. During the early 1950s, Brochet sold some 58 light planes of eight designs to the French government for distribution to the country's aeroclubs.

== Aircraft produced ==
Maurice Brochet built the MB.10 and the MB.20 gliders in the 1930s. The latter became the Avia 50 motorized glider. He also built three units of the MB.30 monoplane with parasol wing in 1934 before opening the Brochet factory.

The aircraft produced in series by the factory after WW II were the following:

- Brochet MB.40 (1 built)
- Brochet MB.50 (12 built)
- Brochet MB.60 (1 built)
- Brochet MB.70 Series (8 built)
- Brochet MB.80 Series (11 built)
- Brochet MB.100 Series (21 built)
- Brochet MB.110 (2 built)
- Brochet MB.120 (2 built)
