= 1951 Ringway Dakota crash =

1951 aviation accident

1951 Ringway Dakota accident
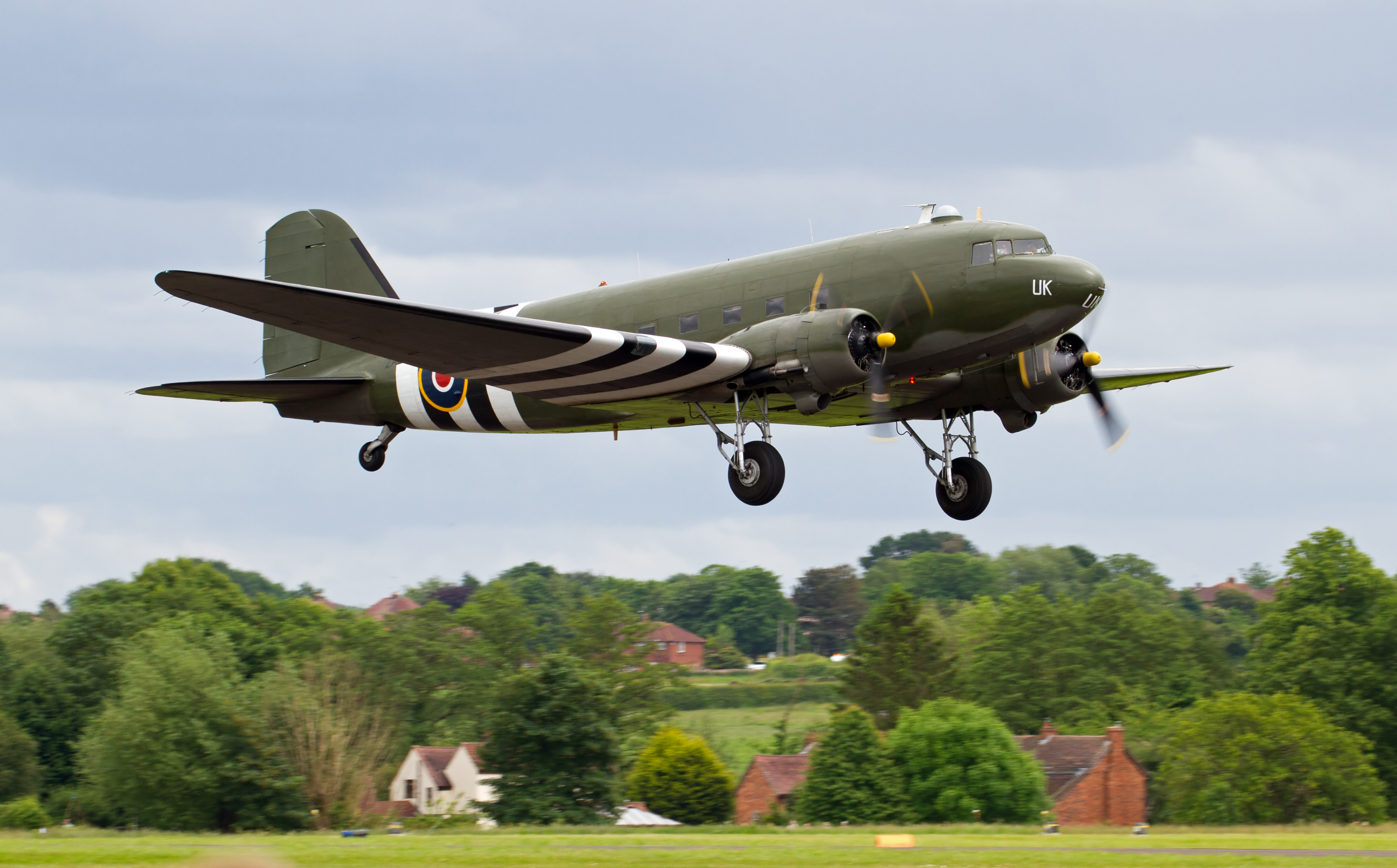
- A Douglas Dakota similar to the accident aircraft

Accident
- Date: 27 March 1951
- Summary: Icing leading to mechanical failure
- Site: Ringway Airport, Manchester, England; 53.363°N 2.262°W

Aircraft
- Aircraft type: Douglas Dakota 3
- Operator: Air Transport Charter
- Registration: G-AJVZ
- Flight origin: Ringway, Manchester, England
- Destination: Nutts Corner Airport, Antrim, Northern Ireland
- Passengers: 0
- Crew: 3
- Fatalities: 2
- Injuries: 1
- Survivors: 1

On 27 March 1951 a Douglas Dakota 3 cargo aircraft registered G-AJVZ operated by Air Transport Charter en route from Ringway Airport, Manchester, England, to Nutts Corner Airport, Antrim, Northern Ireland, crashed shortly after takeoff following the failure of the aircraft to gain height. There were two fatalities amongst the crew on board.

== Accident ==
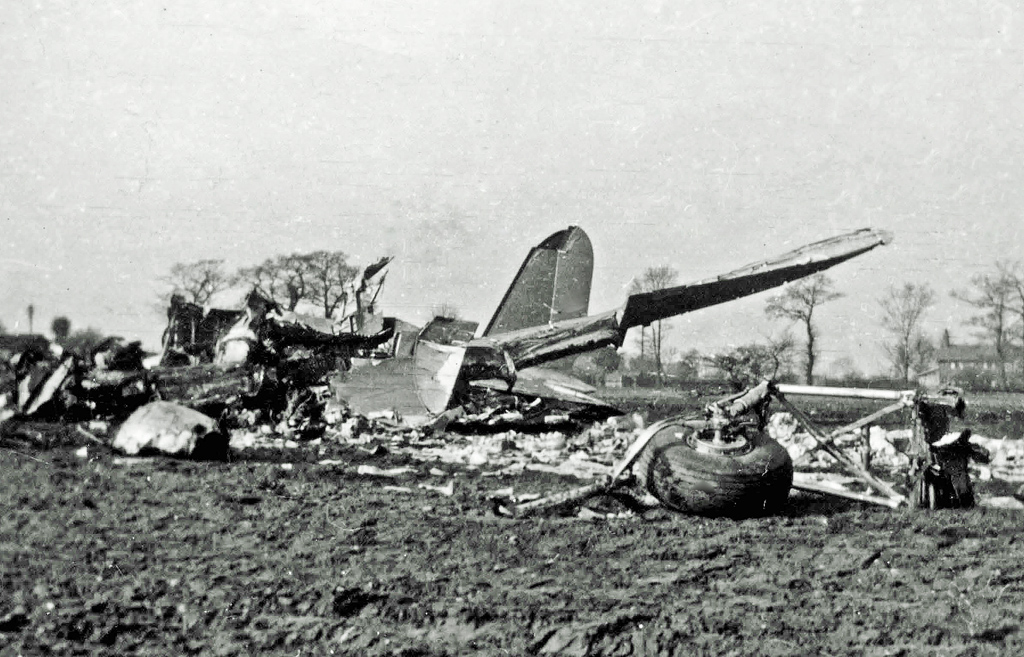
The wreckage of C-47A G-AJVZ at Heyhead on the morning of 27 March 1951.

The Dakota was operating a flight carrying newspapers from Ringway to Nutts Corner. During the takeoff run, there was no evidence of any problem, but the aircraft did not become airborne until near the end of the runway, which was 1,400 yards (1,300 m) long. On takeoff from Runway 06 in freezing conditions and falling snow, it swung to port, failed to climb, and struck the top of a tree in Woodhouse Lane, close to the hamlet of Heyhead, half a mile from the end of the runway. Both pilots were killed.

== Conclusion ==
It was snowing heavily at the time of the flight and before taking off, the pilot did not take any action to clear accumulated snow from the aircraft. A post-crash investigation of the wreckage found soot deposits that were consistent with engine backfiring that could have been caused by an incorrect fuel-air mixture. Investigators also found that the carburetor intake screens in each engine were distorted in the same way that indicated that frozen snow or ice had packed the intakes, causing a serious loss of power in the engines. They concluded that the captain had failed to make use of the heat controls that would have diverted hot air into the carburetors, melting the ice. This failure caused the aircraft to lose a significant amount of engine power. The extended undercarriage and the presence of snow on the wings may have also been contributory factors.
