= Chatelain AC.5 =

1950s French aircraft

AC.5 Bijou

General information
- Type: recreational aircraft
- Manufacturer: homebuilt
- Designer: Armand Chatelain
- Primary user: private pilot owners

History
- First flight: 10 September 1956

The Chatelain AC-5 is a 1950s French two-seat homebuilt aircraft designed by Armand Chatelain.

== Development ==
The AC-5 was a high-wing monoplane with a wing of all-wood construction and a fuselage made of steel tubes.

== Specifications ==
Data from

General characteristics

- Crew: 2
- Length: 5.20 m (17 ft 1 in)
- Wingspan: 9.00 m (29 ft 6 in)
- Wing area: 14.00 m^{2} (150.7 sq ft)
- Empty weight: 335 kg (739 lb)
- Gross weight: 570 kg (1,257 lb)
- Powerplant: 1 × Minié 4.DC.32 air-cooled horizontally-opposed piston engine, 56 kW (75 hp)
- Propellers: 2-bladed SIPA propeller

Performance

- Maximum speed: 165 km/h (103 mph, 89 kn)
- Range: 500 km (310 mi, 270 nmi)
- Service ceiling: 4,000 m (13,000 ft)
