= Indraéro Aéro 101 =

Light training biplane developed in France

Aéro 101 and Aéro 110
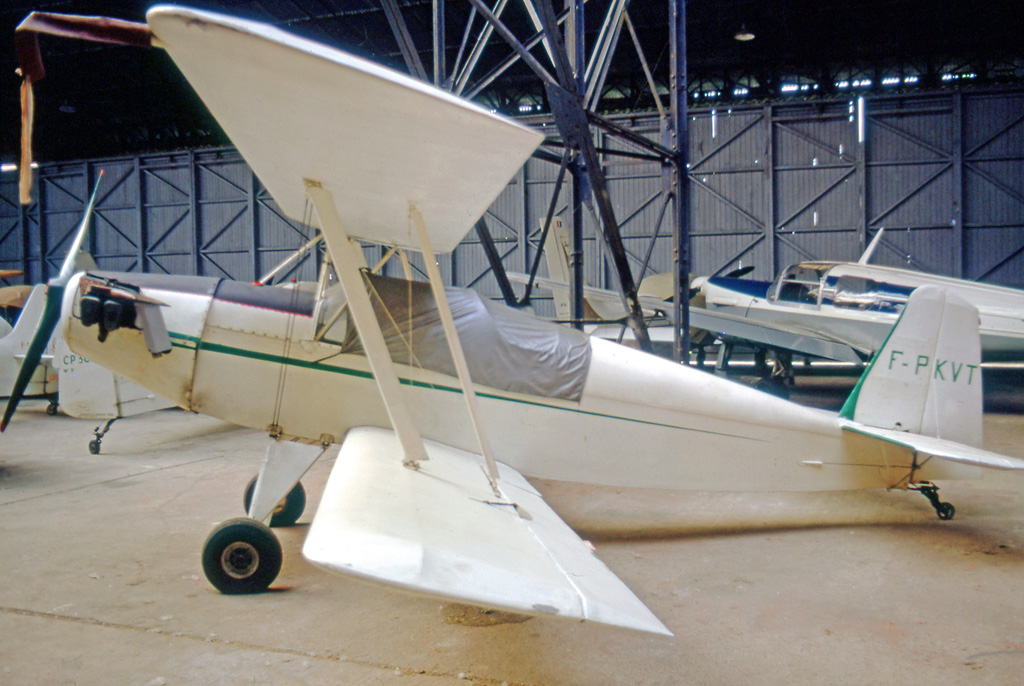
- Aero 101 at Mitry-Mory airfield, near Paris, in June 1971

General information
- Type: Civil trainer
- National origin: France
- Manufacturer: Indraéro
- Designer: Jean Chapeau and J. Blanchet
- Status: three examples active in 2009
- Primary user: SALS
- Number built: ca 13

History
- First flight: 27 July 1951

The Indraéro Aéro 101 was a light training biplane developed in France in the 1950s.

== Design and service ==
It was a conventional design with single-bay staggered wings braced with an I-strut, and fixed tailskid undercarriage with divided main units. The pilot and instructor sat in tandem, open cockpits. A small batch of aircraft were ordered by SALS for aeroclub use.

The prototype, known as the Aéro 110, differing from the later production Aero 101s by having a welded steel tube fuselage and a 34 kW (45 hp) Salmson 9ADb radial engine, first flew on 1 May 1950

== Operational history ==
Three examples of the type were current on the French Civil Aircraft Register in 2009, including an Aero 101C and two Aero 101s.

== Variants ==
Aéro 110
Prototype of the Aero 101 with welded steel tube fuselage and Salmson 9ADb radial engine first flown on 1 May 1950, 1 built.
Aéro 101
Ten production aircraft built with wooden structure and powered by Minié 4.DC.32 engines, first flown on 27 July 1951.
Aéro 101C
At least one aircraft fitted with a 48 kW (65 hp) Continental A65.

== Specifications (Aéro 101) ==
Data from

General characteristics

- Crew: 2
- Length: 5.6 m (18 ft 4 in)
- Wingspan: 7.6 m (24 ft 11 in)
- Height: 2.2 m (7 ft 3 in)
- Wing area: 14.0 m^{2} (151 sq ft)
- Empty weight: 312 kg (688 lb)
- Gross weight: 505 kg (1,113 lb)
- Powerplant: 1 × Minié 4.DC.32 4-cyl. air-cooled horizontally-opposed piston engine, 56 kW (75 hp)

Performance

- Maximum speed: 178 km/h (111 mph, 96 kn)

== Bibliography ==
- Taylor, Michael J. H. (1989). Jane's Encyclopedia of Aviation. London: Studio Editions. p. 534.
- Simpson, R. W. (1995). Airlife's General Aviation. Shrewsbury: Airlife Publishing. pp. 424–25.
- Partington, Dave (2009). European Registers Handbook 2009. Tonbridge, Kent: Air-Britain (Historians) Ltd. ISBN 978-0-85130-417-5.
