= Brochet MB.100 =

1950s French light aircraft

MB.100

General information
- Type: Sports plane
- Manufacturer: Brochet
- Designer: Maurice Brochet
- Number built: 21

History
- First flight: 3 January 1951

The Brochet MB.100 was a three-seat light aircraft developed in France in the early 1950s.

== Design and development ==
A further derivative of the Brochet MB.70, the MB.100 uses essentially the same airframe as the MB.80, but with a revised tail and cabin, the latter now including a third seat. Service de l'Aviation Légère et Sportive purchased several examples for distribution to French aeroclubs, including a number of tropicalised versions for use in North Africa. Unlike its predecessors, the MB.100 was not designed for homebuilding.

== Variants ==
- MB.100 - initial production version (7 built)
- MB.101 - tropicalised version with engine air filter and more durable exterior finish (14 built)

== Specifications (MB.100) ==
Data from Janes's All The World's Aircraft 1956–57

General characteristics

- Crew: 1
- Capacity: 2 passengers
- Length: 6.50 m (21 ft 4 in)
- Wingspan: 10.66 m (35 ft 0 in)
- Height: 2.0 m (6 ft 7 in)
- Wing area: 14.23 m^{2} (153.2 sq ft)
- Empty weight: 465 kg (1,025 lb)
- Gross weight: 780 kg (1,720 lb)
- Powerplant: 1 × Hirth HM 504 four-cylinder inverted air-cooled engine, 68 kW (91 hp)

Performance

- Maximum speed: 180 km/h (110 mph, 97 kn)
- Cruise speed: 165 km/h (103 mph, 89 kn)
- Range: 600 km (370 mi, 320 nmi)
- Service ceiling: 3,500 m (11,500 ft)
- Rate of climb: 3 m/s (590 ft/min)
