= Brochet MB.80 =

Light aircraft

MB.80
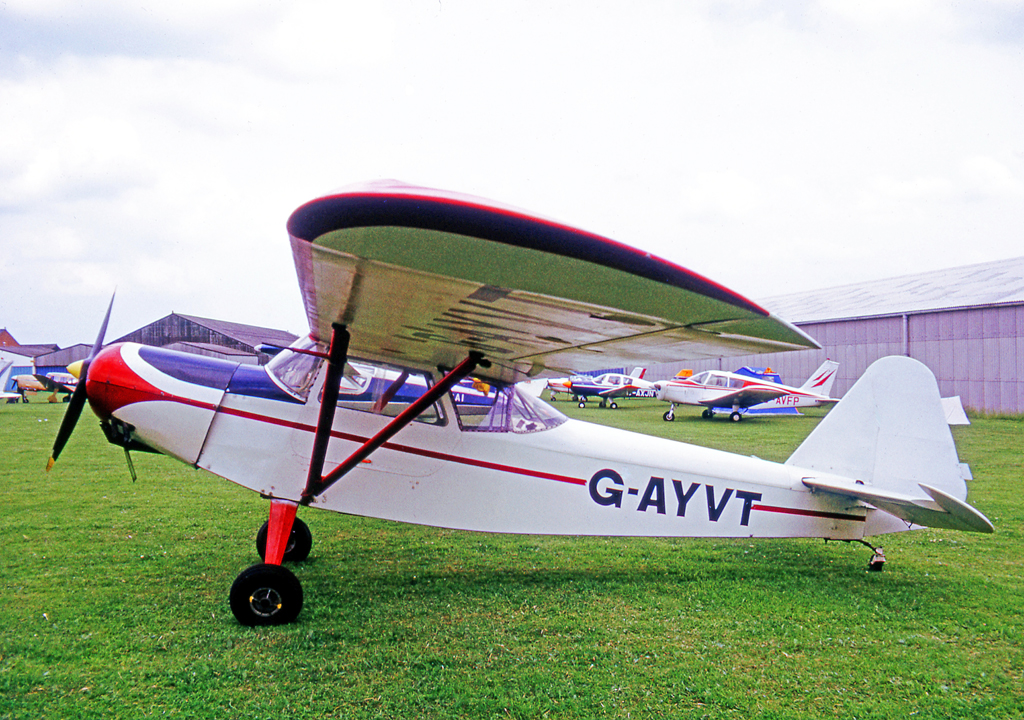
- Brochet MB.84, built in the early 1950s, attending a rally at Sywell Aerodrome England in 1973 after acquisition from France.

General information
- Type: Sports plane
- Manufacturer: Brochet
- Designer: Maurice Brochet
- Primary user: private pilot owners
- Number built: 11

History
- First flight: 4 October 1951

The Brochet MB.80 was a two-seat light aircraft developed in France in the early 1950s.

== Design and development ==
The MB.80 was a derivative of the Brochet MB.70, using essentially the same airframe, but with a redesigned wider fuselage and revised undercarriage. The Service de l'Aviation Légère et Sportive purchased ten examples for distribution to French aeroclubs. Most examples were operated in France, but one example was later sold privately to the United Kingdom.

== Variants ==
MB.80
production version powered by Minié 4DC-32B (10 built)
MB.81
version with Hirth HM 500B-2 engine (1 built)
MB.83
version with Continental C90 engine (1 converted from MB.80)
MB.84
version with Continental A65 engine (1 converted from MB.80 F-BGLI)

== Specifications (MB.80) ==
General characteristics

- Crew: One pilot
- Capacity: 1 passenger
- Length: 6.58 m (21 ft 7 in)
- Wingspan: 10.45 m (34 ft 3 in)
- Height: 2.55 m (8 ft 4 in)
- Wing area: 14.2 m^{2} (153 sq ft)
- Empty weight: 385 kg (849 lb)
- Gross weight: 615 kg (1,356 lb)
- Powerplant: 1 × Minié 4.DC.32B , 56 kW (75 hp)

Performance

- Maximum speed: 158 km/h (99 mph, 86 kn)
- Range: 500 km (310 mi, 270 nmi)
- Rate of climb: 3.5 m/s (690 ft/min)

== See also ==
Aircraft of comparable role, configuration, and era

- Piper PA-11 Cub Special
