= Sanoyie =

Town in Bong County, Liberia

Sanoyie (Sonoyea, Sanoghie, Sanoye)
- Town
- Location in Liberia
- Coordinates: 6°58′44″N 9°59′0″W
- Country: Liberia
- County: Bong County
- Elevation: 879 ft (268 m)
- Time zone: UTC0

Sanoyea is a town in Bong County, Liberia. Alternate spellings for the town are Sanoyie, Sanoghie and Sanoye. The official language of the town is Kpelle. The meaning of Sanoyea in Kpelle is a fruit bearing tree (Sano) on the hill (yea).

The town is located 158 km north east of Monrovia, capital of Liberia.

Historical attractions include the Curran Memorial Lutheran Church, the Sanoyea public school, and former Lutheran Mission Campus.

The town was affected by the Liberian civil war which lasted approximately 14 years (1989 to 2003). Many residents fled during this time to the neighboring bushes returning only as the war subsided.

Famous residents include Benedict Wolapaye Mitchell, who was the chief nurse of the town. Others include: Moses Giddings, Momo Kaine, Cooper Vuku, and Peter Kollie.

In 1951, Pan Am Flight 151 crashed into a hill near Sanoyea. There were no survivors among the 40 on board.
