= Brochet MB.30 =

1930s French light aircraft

MB.30
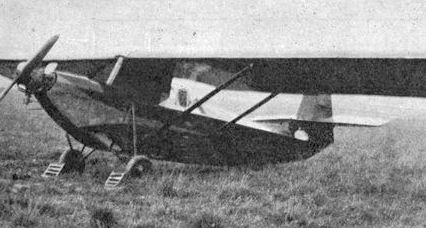

General information
- Type: Sports aircraft
- National origin: France
- Manufacturer: Brochet for homebuilding
- Designer: Maurice Brochet
- Number built: at least 1

History
- First flight: 11 September 1934

The Brochet MB.30 was a single-seat sports aircraft designed by Maurice Brochet in the mid-1930s.

The MB-30 surname was "little pike".

== Design and development ==
The MB.30 was a parasol-wing monoplane of all-wooden construction.

It is derived from the MB-20, the noticeable change was the addition of a tractor engine.

== Specifications ==
Data from

General characteristics

- Length: 6 m (19 ft 8 in)
- Wingspan: 10 m (32 ft 10 in)
- Wing area: 13.5 m^{2} (145 sq ft)
- Empty weight: 190 kg (419 lb)
- Gross weight: 300 kg (661 lb)
- Powerplant: 1 × Poinsard 25hp 2-cyl 2-cylinder air-cooled horizontally-opposed piston engine, 19 kW (25 hp)

Performance

- Maximum speed: 105 km/h (65 mph, 57 kn)
