= Pan Am Flight 151 =

1951 aircraft accident in Liberia

Coordinates: 06°58′39″N 10°01′33″W

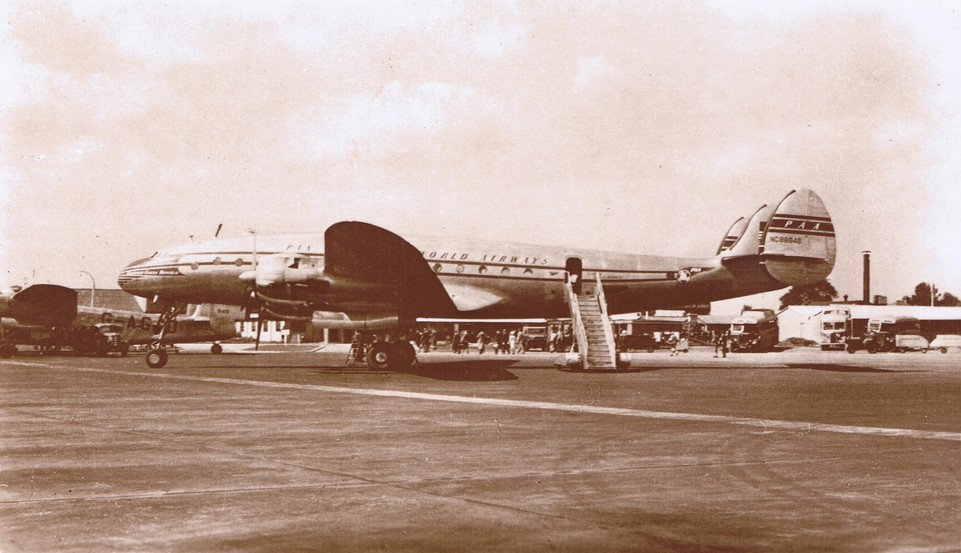
- N88846, the aircraft involved in the accident

Accident
- Date: 22 June 1951
- Summary: Controlled flight into terrain
- Site: near Sanoyie, Bong County, Liberia

Aircraft
- Aircraft type: Lockheed L-1049 Constellation
- Aircraft name: Clipper Great Republic
- Operator: Pan Am World Airways
- Call sign: CLIPPER 151
- Registration: N88846
- Flight origin: Johannesburg, Union of South Africa
- 1st stopover: Leopoldville, Belgian Congo
- 2nd stopover: Accra, Gold Coast
- Last stopover: Monrovia, Liberia
- Destination: New York City
- Passengers: 31
- Crew: 9
- Fatalities: 40
- Survivors: 0

On 22 June 1951, Pan Am Flight 151, flown by the Lockheed L-049 Constellation propliner Clipper Great Republic (registration N88846) crashed into a West African hill at an elevation of 1,050 ft (320 m) near the village of Sanoyie (Note: The village is spelled "Sanoye" in the official CAB accident report, but four spelling variations are known to be used: Sonoyea, Sanoghie, Sanoye and, as used by both Google Maps and Bing Maps, Sanoyie.) in Bong County, Liberia. All 31 passengers and nine crew on board were killed.

== Sequence of events ==
The Johannesburg to New York City flight was on the Accra, Gold Coast (now Ghana), to Monrovia, Liberia leg of its journey. At 0301h during a pre-dawn approach to Monrovia's Robertsfield Airport, the flight crew reported to the tower that the radio beacon at Dakar, Senegal was interfering with the Robertsfield radio beacon. After a 0315h weather report was sent to the pilots, all contact with the aircraft was lost. The flight was reported missing at 0410h on June 22, and an aerial search was conducted, but it was unsuccessful in locating the aircraft. At 1430h on June 23, a foot messenger arrived from the village of Sanoyie to report that an aircraft crashed into the side of a hill one day earlier several miles from the village and that everyone aboard was killed.

After a day's search, the "completely disintegrated remains of the Pan American World Airways plane that disappeared over West Africa Thursday night were found yesterday," Harold R. Harris, vice president of the line said. Searchers from a Lutheran mission at Sanoye, Liberia, first located the shattered four-engine plane that had carried thirty-one passengers and a crew of nine. Later, Pan American officials in a company plane flew over the wreckage and identified it.

What was left of the big transport was found by the mission hunting party about four miles southwest of the village of Sanoye and about 45 miles north-northeast of Roberts Field. The plane had hit near the top of a 1,500-foot hill.

— The New York Times, June 24, 1951

== Investigation ==
It was determined that the location where the flight crashed was beyond the effective range of the Robertsfield beacon. This, combined with the report from the crew that the Dakar beacon was interfering with the Robertsfield beacon, resulted in the frequency of the Robertsfield beacon being changed to provide greater separation of frequencies between the two beacons. Investigation of the wreckage revealed no indications of mechanical malfunction, the aircraft had enough fuel for another eight hours of flight, the weight and disposition of the payload was within allowable limits, and the weather was above minima.

The Civil Aeronautics Board investigation concluded that the probable cause of the accident was the action of the captain in descending below his en route minimum altitude without positive identification of the flight's position.
