= Air Transport Charter =

Airline of the United Kingdom 1947–1950

Air Transport Charter (C.I.) Limited was a Jersey based charter and cargo airline from 1947 to 1950.

== History ==
The company was formed in July 1946 to carry out passenger and cargo charters from the Channel Islands mainly to England. Operations were started in March 1947 but came to a halt on 31 October 1952. The 1950 takeover of fellow Island Air Charters, which had also operated schedules from 1947 to 1949, had not helped. The airline's reputation had been damaged by two crashes, the worst being that of March 1951.

== Fleet ==
The fleet consisted of the following aircraft types:

- de Havilland Dragon Rapide
- Douglas DC-3
- Miles Aerovan

== Accidents and incidents ==
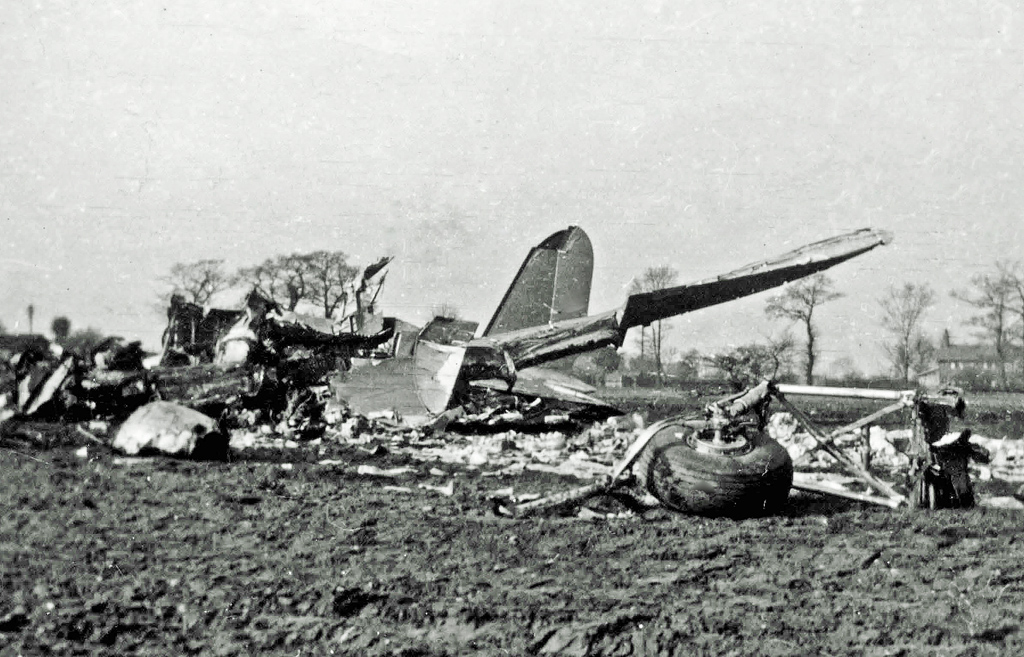
Douglas DC-3 registered G-AJVZ after crashing near Ringway Airport Manchester in March 1951

- On 20 May 1948 a Douglas DC-3 cargo aircraft registered G-AJBG carrying fruit from Valence to Bovingdon, crashed into a tree while doing a circuit at Bovingdon at night and in low visibility
- On 27 March 1951 a Douglas DC-3 cargo aircraft registered G-AJVZ en route from Ringway Airport, Manchester (England) to Nutts Corner Airport, Antrim, Northern Ireland, crashed shortly after take-off on a newspaper flight following the failure of the aircraft to gain altitude. There were four fatalities, two of the three crew on board and two of the three passengers.

== See also ==
- List of defunct airlines of the United Kingdom
