= United Air Lines Flight 610 =

1951 aviation accident

Coordinates: 40°32′20″N 105°25′58″W

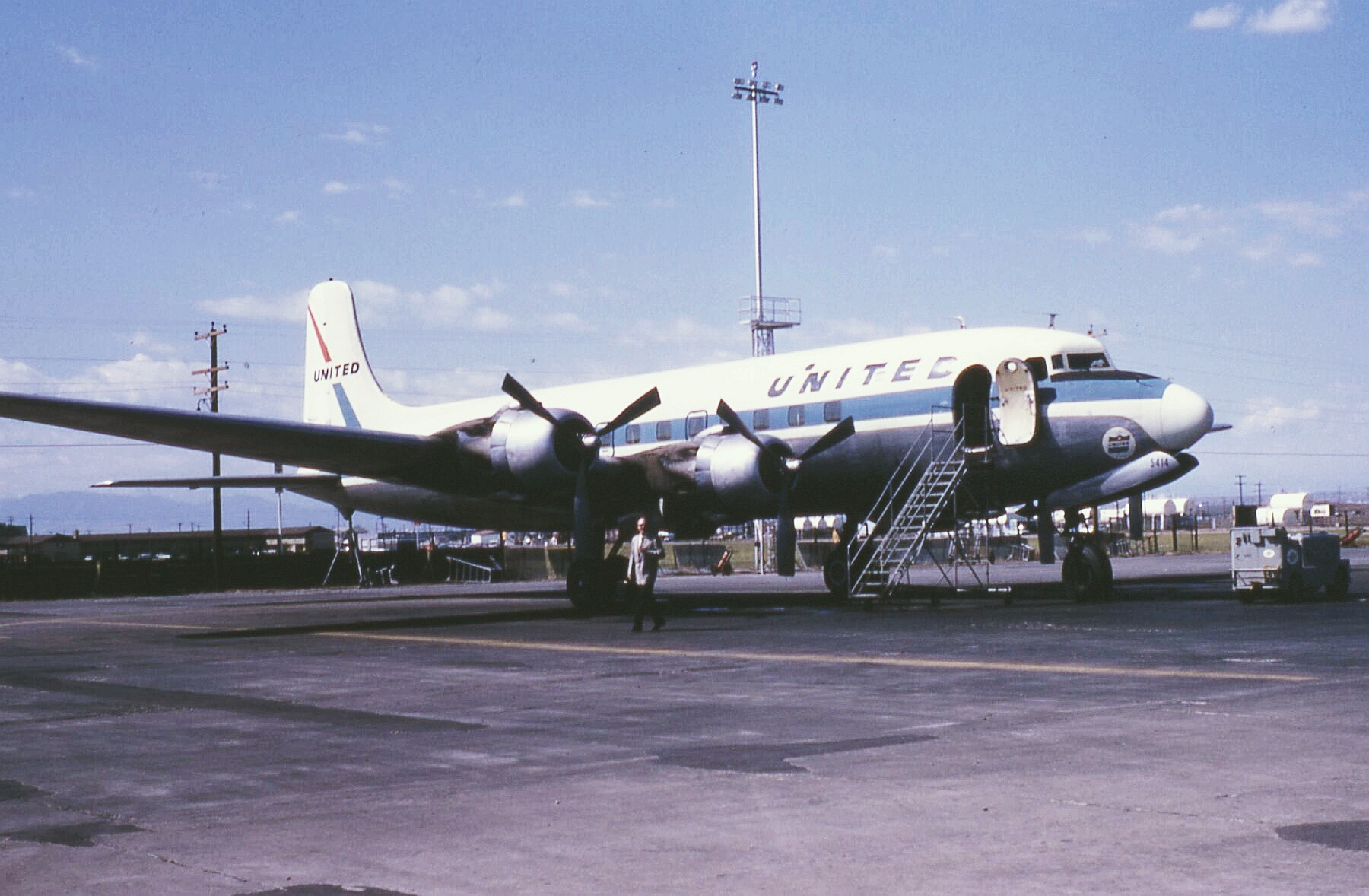
- A United Air Lines Douglas DC-6 similar to the one involved

Accident
- Date: June 30, 1951
- Summary: Controlled flight into terrain
- Site: Crystal Mountain west of Fort Collins, Colorado, United States

Aircraft
- Aircraft type: Douglas DC-6
- Aircraft name: Mainliner Overland Trail
- Operator: United Air Lines
- Call sign: UNITED 610
- Registration: N37543
- Occupants: 50
- Passengers: 45
- Crew: 5
- Fatalities: 50
- Survivors: 0

On June 30, 1951, United Air Lines Flight 610, a US transcontinental San Francisco–Oakland–Salt Lake City–Denver–Chicago service flown by the Douglas DC-6 aircraft Mainliner Overland Trail (registration N37543) crashed in Larimer County, northwest of Denver. All 50 on board (45 passengers and 5 crew) were killed.

== Events leading up to crash ==
After completing its first two segments, Flight 610 departed Salt Lake City at 12:11 a.m. en route to Denver. At around 1:47 a.m, Flight 610 reported to air traffic control that it had passed the Cheyenne radio range station, and requested a lower altitude, which was granted down to 8,500 feet.

At that point, Flight 610 was scheduled to make a right turn to intercept the 168° course line of the DEN low frequency range, and then to proceed to the WONT intersection, its next clearance limit. To intercept that course line, the plane turned to a heading of approximately 210°, which was a proper intercept angle of almost 45°. If the pilot had configured his audio selector switches properly, he would have been able to hear the aural Morse code identifier of "A", for the north side of that low frequency range. As he neared the course line itself, he would then have begun to hear the "N" identifier, the signal to turn left again, and could track the 168° course line to the WONT intersection.

However, the plane did not turn left, remaining on a 210° intercept heading until impact. At 2:00 a.m. the DC-6 crashed into Crystal Mountain, about 50 miles NNW of Denver. It skidded 690' to a stop and it burst into flames.

== Nature of error ==
It was thought that the pilot, in a darkened cockpit, might have selected the wrong audio frequency switches. This, instead of giving him the appropriate Denver low frequency radio range signals, gave him the Denver Visual Audio Range (VAR) course signals. Both of those navigation ranges used the same audio morse code identifier of "DEN." Both of those ranges needed to be received to pinpoint the WONT intersection- the position to which the flight had been cleared by ATC. If the captain had set those switches to incorrect positions, though, so that he was listening to the aural identifiers for the VAR course, he would have heard only the "A" identifier, but not the "N" identifier, which was needed to tell him when it was time to turn left again.

After that investigation, the letter "V" was added to the "DEN" Morse code identifier for the VAR course, to avoid confusion with the DEN low frequency range.

According to the July 1 edition of the New York Times, Robert M. Byers, a United Press International reporter, observed the wreckage from a plane and reported that the aircraft had gouged out a path 150' long by 50' wide through the heavy timber, about 8,600' up Crystal Mountain. He also indicated that smoke rose from the gash torn in the trees by the splintered airliner.
