= Brochet MB.70 =

1950s French light aircraft

MB.70 Series
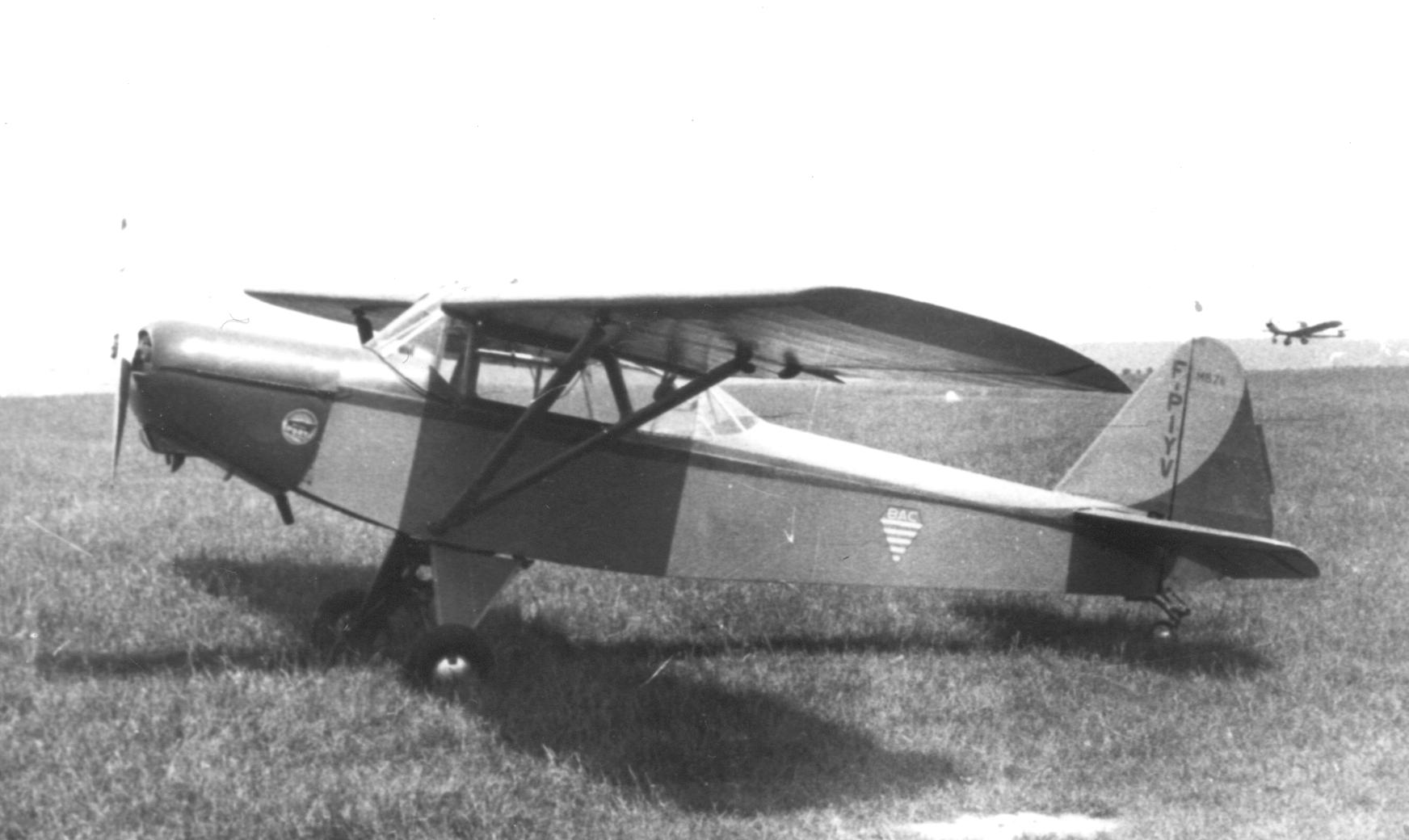
- The Brochet MB.76 at Chavenay airfield near Paris in June 1967

General information
- Type: Sports plane
- Manufacturer: Brochet
- Designer: Maurice Brochet
- Number built: 8

History
- First flight: 28 January 1950

The Brochet MB.70 was a two-seat light aircraft developed in France in the early 1950s for recreational flying and amateur construction.

== Design and development ==
It was a high-wing braced monoplane of conventional configuration that seated the pilot and passenger in tandem within a fully enclosed cabin. It was fitted with fixed tailwheel undercarriage layout and was of all-wooden construction. Progress was hastened by the publication of a Service de l'Aviation Légère et Sportive requirement for a new light aircraft for French aeroclubs, and a series of development machines were built with a variety of different engines, eventually leading to the definitive Brochet MB.80.

== Variants ==
- MB.70 - prototype powered by Salmson 9Adb radial (1 built)
- MB.71 - version with Minié 4.DC.32 engine (1 built)
- MB.72 - version with Continental A65 horizontally opposed four-cylinder engine (5 built)
- MB.73 - version with Continental A65-85 horizontally opposed four-cylinder engine (1 converted from the MB.70)
- MB.76 - version with Continental C90-14F horizontally opposed four-cylinder engine (1 built)

== Units using this aircraft ==
Private and club pilots

== Specifications (MB.72) ==
Data from The Aircraft of the World

General characteristics

- Crew: One pilot
- Capacity: 1 passenger
- Length: 6.50 m (21 ft 4 in)
- Wingspan: 10.52 m (34 ft 6 in)
- Height: 2.49 m (8 ft 2 in)
- Wing area: 14.0 m^{2} (151 sq ft)
- Empty weight: 372 kg (820 lb)
- Gross weight: 570 kg (1,257 lb)
- Powerplant: 1 × Continental A65 , 48 kW (65 hp)

Performance

- Maximum speed: 163 km/h (101 mph, 88 kn)
- Cruise speed: 140 km/h (90 mph, 78 kn)
- Rate of climb: 4.0 m/s (780 ft/min)
