= ANF Les Mureaux 140T =

1932 French postal delivery monoplane

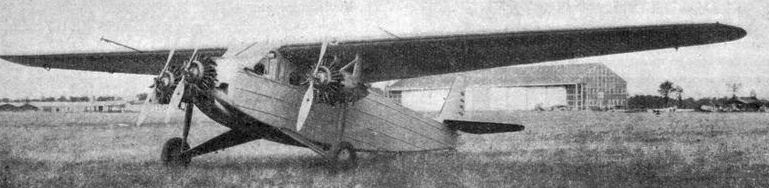

General information
- Type: High-wing monoplane
- National origin: France
- Manufacturer: ANF Les Mureaux
- Service: French Armed Forces
- Major applications: Postal Delivery
- Number built: 1

History
- First flight: September 1932
- Last flight: Summer 1935
- Variants: Nieuport-Delage NiD 740, SPCA 40T and Farman F.280
- Fate: Destroyed in an accident

The ANF Les Mureaux 140T was a French postal monoplane first flown in September 1932. It was a high-wing monoplane powered by three 120 hp (89 kW) Salmson 9Ac radial engines. It had room for six passengers or four plus freight or mail but it did not enter production.

== Development ==
In the early thirties, the French Ministry of Aviation published a requirement for a light three-engine transport aircraft capable of carrying at least 300 kg of cargo and continuing to fly on two engines without dropping altitude. Although the program was soon abandoned, a number of aircraft were designed to meet these requirements: the ANF Mureaux 140T, Nieuport-Delage NiD-740, SPCA 40T and Farman F.280.

The Ateliers de Construction du Nord de la France et des Mureaux aircraft was an enlarged version of the twin-engine Mureaux 120, fitted with three 120 hp Salmson 9Ac star engines. The pilot was seated in an enclosed cockpit just behind the centre engine, and the cabin could accommodate up to six passengers or a cargo of 300 kg of mail.

The first flight of the prototype took place in September 1932. On 18 October the plane was exhibited at the Paris Air Show. Soon the second prototype was completed and handed over for testing at the Vilacouble centre. On April 30, 1933 it was used at the Commercial Aviation Day exhibition.

Tests continued until the summer of 1935, when both aircraft were lost in accidents.

== Specification ==
Data from Les Ailes, October 1932

General characteristics

- Crew: one normally
- Capacity: six passengers maximum
- Length: 11.75 m (38 ft 7 in)
- Wingspan: 20.60 m (67 ft 7 in)
- Height: 3.15 m (10 ft 4 in)
- Wing area: 42.50 m^{2} (457.5 sq ft) 10
- Empty weight: 1,970 kg (4,343 lb)
- Gross weight: 2,800 kg (6,173 lb)
- Powerplant: 3 × Salmson 9Ac 9-cylinder radials, 89 kW (120 hp) each
- Propellers: 2-bladed

Performance

- Maximum speed: 215 km/h (134 mph, 116 kn) at ground level
- Range: 900 km (560 mi, 490 nmi)
- Service ceiling: 7,000 m (23,000 ft)
- Time to altitude: 15 min to 3,500 m (11,500 ft)
