= Marcel Audemard d'Alançon =

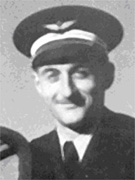
- Born: Éric Henri Marcel Audemard d’Alançon; January 5, 1914; Paris, France
- Died: June 6, 1940 (aged 26) Morvillers-Saint-Saturnin, France
- Allegiance: France
- Branch: French Air Force
- Service years: 1935–1940
- Rank: Second lieutenant
- Conflicts: World War II

Éric Henri Marcel Audemard d’Alançon (5 January 1914 – 6 June 1940) was an airman in the French Air Force during World War II.

== Biography ==
=== Early years ===
Alançon was born on January 5, 1914, in Paris, France. He was born into a military family and entered an Air Force school in Versailles in his mid teens. On October 1, 1935, he graduated and enlisted in the French Air Force.

=== Military career ===
On November 4, at Villacoublay, he began his Air Force flying lessons, he flew the Morane-Saulnier MS.315 and Potez 25 aircraft. He was named a corporal on April 4, 1936, and did his pilot training at Avord, from April to August 1936; he officially became a pilot on July 3, shortly before being promoted to sergeant on August 1, 1936.

Promoted to the rank of second lieutenant on October 1, 1937, Marcel d'Alançon left Villacoublay that same month of October, transferred to the 23rd bombardment squadron based in Toulouse. From October 1937 to January 1938, he was detached to Istres to help with development of multi-engine aircraft, including the Lioré et Olivier LeO 20 BN3. Recognized for his qualities, he was sent to Salon-de-Provence to be a hunting instructor in 1937 and 1938.

On June 24, 1938, he left Salon-de-Provence for the air base of Reims where, on July 1, 1938, he joined his new assignment: the squadron SPA 153, second squadron of the hunting group I/4, where he flew on Dewoitine D.501.

On August 27, 1939, the I/4 hunting group, newly equipped with Curtiss H-75, goes into war operations and deploys on the field of Mars operations of Wez-Thuizy. Then he was transferred in November to the front in Belgium and in Artois, first on the ground in Rely-Norrent-Fontes in the Pas-de-Calais, then at Mardyck near Dunkirk. Promoted to the rank of lieutenant on 1 October 1939, he defeated a Messerschmitt Bf 109E on 5 June 1940 during a bomber protection mission. This was one of his 7 confirmed air-to-air kills.

=== Death ===
On June 6, 1940, at 7:30 a.m, his squadron came under attack. Alançon's unit came until attack by approximately 30 to 35 Messerschmitt Bf 109. He was shot down by two enemy aircraft, in total 9 French aircraft were lost including Alançon's. His aircraft was seen spiraling to the ground on wing completely detached. After extensive research conducted with the help of witnesses, the gendarmes of Poix-de-Picardie found the remains of his aircraft. Alançon was killed instantly. Marcel Audemard d 'Alançon was laid to rest on December 29, 1940, in the small cemetery in Morvillers-Saint-Saturnin.
