= Morane-Saulnier MS.300 =

French parasol wing introductory trainer aircraft

MS.300/MS.301

General information
- Type: Primary trainer
- National origin: France
- Manufacturer: Morane-Saulnier
- Designer: Robert Morane
- Number built: 2

History
- First flight: 1930
- Developed into: Morane-Saulnier MS.230

The Morane-Saulnier MS.300 and MS.301 were French parasol wing introductory trainer aircraft, first flown in 1930. They differed only in engine type. Neither reached production but were developed into two similar trainers, the MS.230 and MS.315, which were made in large numbers.

== Design and development ==
Morane-Saulnier's interest in the parasol wing configuration began with the Morane-Saulnier L of 1913 and its continuous refinement produced a line of fighters, trainers and sports aircraft which continued into the 1930s. The layout offered intrinsic stability and a wide field of view from the cockpit. The MS.300, a basic trainer, had a large gap between wing and fuselage and a wide track undercarriage, easing the progress of its novice pilots. There were two versions, the MS.300 and MS.301, which only differed in their engines.

Most of the two part wing of the MS.300 had constant chord and was swept at 5°. The tips were rounded and there was a deep cut-out in the trailing edge over the fuselage to improve the upward view from the forward cockpit. The wings were built around two pairs of duralumin spars with wooden ribs and were canvas covered. They were braced with pairs of near-parallel struts from the spars at mid-span to the fuselage and the central wing was joined to the upper fuselage with a pair of transverse inverted-V cabane struts, one to each spar and cross-braced. Narrow chord ailerons entirely occupied the trailing edges.

The fuselage of the MS.300 was a rectangular section girder constructed of dural in the forward part containing the engine and cockpits, but wooden aft. Fairings produced a more rounded section, its surface metal in the front but fabric behind. The MS.300 had a 71 kW (95 hp) Salmson 9P nine-cylinder radial engine in the nose, whereas the MS.301 had a five-cylinder, 75 kW (100 hp) Lorraine 5Pa radial. The engine mounting was designed to accept either engine; both were similarly partially enclosed under domed cowlings with cylinder heads protruding for cooling and drove two-blade propellers. The fuel tank, placed behind the engine firewall in the lower fuselage and between the undercarriage legs, could be jettisoned in flight in case of fire. There were two separate, open cockpits in tandem, the forward one under the rear spar and cut-out and the other immediately behind, near the trailing edge. Removable dual controls were fitted and the aircraft could be flown aerobatically from either cockpit.

Its empennage was conventional with a large balanced rudder which reached down to the keel, hinged on a small fin. The in-flight adjustable, wire-braced, triangular tailplane was mounted on top of the fuselage frame, carrying balanced elevators. The MS.300 had fixed, conventional landing gear with its mainwheels independently mounted on V-struts hinged to the lower fuselage, with vertical Messier oleo strut shock absorbers. These were mounted on the forward wing strut at a point which was strengthened by two additional short struts to the fuselage.

Little is recorded about the trials and careers of the MS.300 and 301 and the exact dates of first flights are not known. By early June 1930 the MS.300 had been entered into the rally organised by the Auvergne aero club, where it was to be piloted by Robert Morane, but it was not reported as present the mid-July event. Both variants were completed before December 1930, wearing Air Force markings. L'Aérophile refers to the two variants as one aircraft, which had by December "at last" completed its trials. The MS.301 was on display at the 12th Paris Salon in December 1930.

Though the MS.300/301 did not reach production, it was developed into the successful MS.230 (1,080 produced) and MS.315 (356 produced).

== Variants ==
MS.300
with 71 kW (95 hp) Salmson 9P nine-cylinder radial engine
MS.301
as MS.300 but with 75 kW (100 hp) Lorraine 5Pa five-cylinder radial engine

== Specifications (MS.301) ==
Data from General: L'Aéronautique, December 1930

General characteristics

- Crew: Two, instructor and pupil
- Length: 7.51 m (24 ft 8 in)
- Wingspan: 12 m (39 ft 4 in)
- Height: 2.63 m (8 ft 8 in)
- Wing area: 21.64 m^{2} (232.9 sq ft)
- Empty weight: 672 kg (1,482 lb)
- Gross weight: 933 kg (2,057 lb)
- Fuel capacity: 95 kg (209 lb)
- Powerplant: 1 × Lorraine 5Pa radial, 75 kW (100 hp)
- Propellers: 2-bladed

Performance

- Maximum speed: 130 km/h (81 mph, 70 kn) at 500 m (1,600 ft)
- Service ceiling: 3,500 m (11,500 ft)
- Take-off distance: 70 m (230 ft)
