= Besson MB.35 =

MB.35 Passe Partout
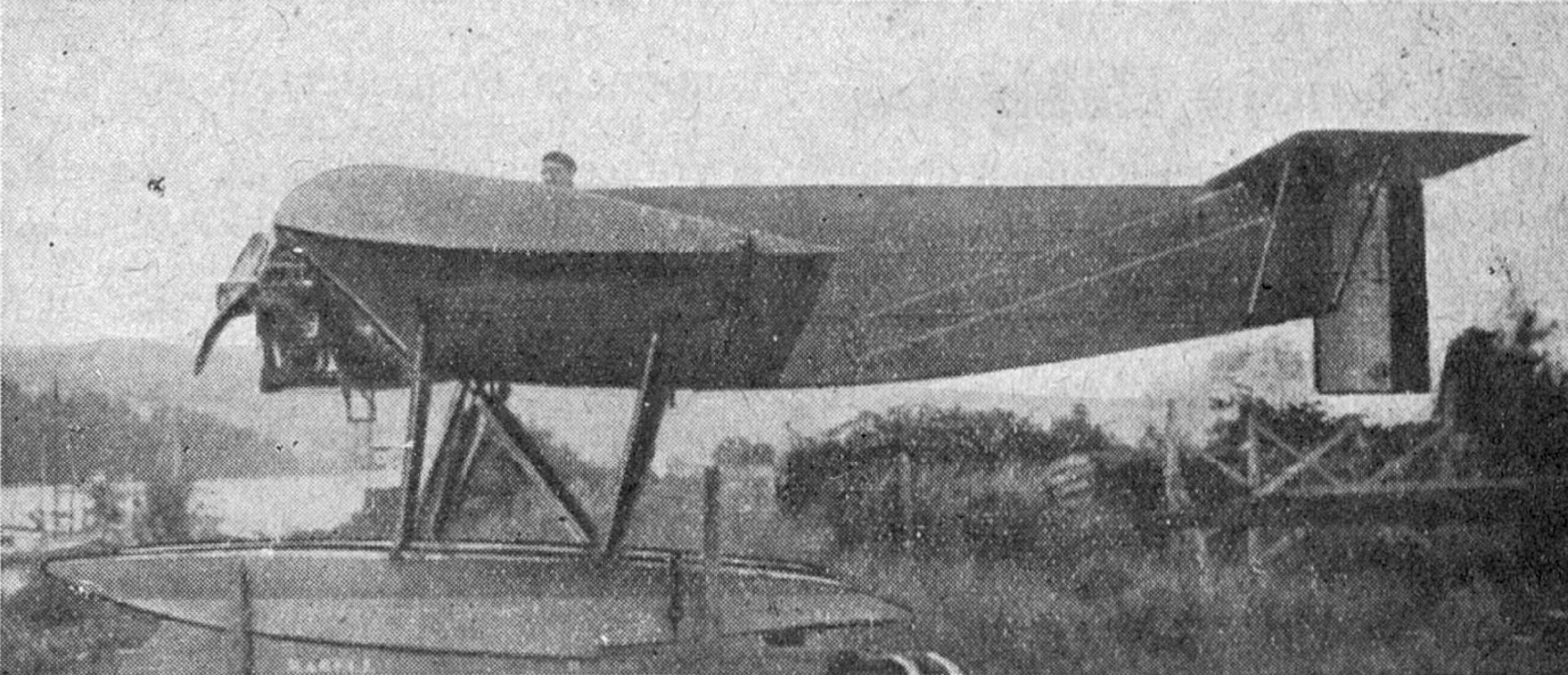

General information
- Type: observation floatplane
- National origin: France
- Manufacturer: Besson
- Designer: Marcel Besson
- Primary user: French Navy
- Number built: 2

History
- First flight: 1926
- Variant: Besson MB.411

The Besson MB.35 Passe Partout was a French two-seat spotter and observation floatplane, designed by Besson. It was intended to serve on Surcouf a very large (for its day) submarine, stowed in a sealed hangar. The first aircraft was destroyed during trials and the second was converted to the MB.41, prototype of the Besson MB.411, which did serve on Surcouf.

== Operators ==
France

- French Navy

== Specification (MB.35) ==
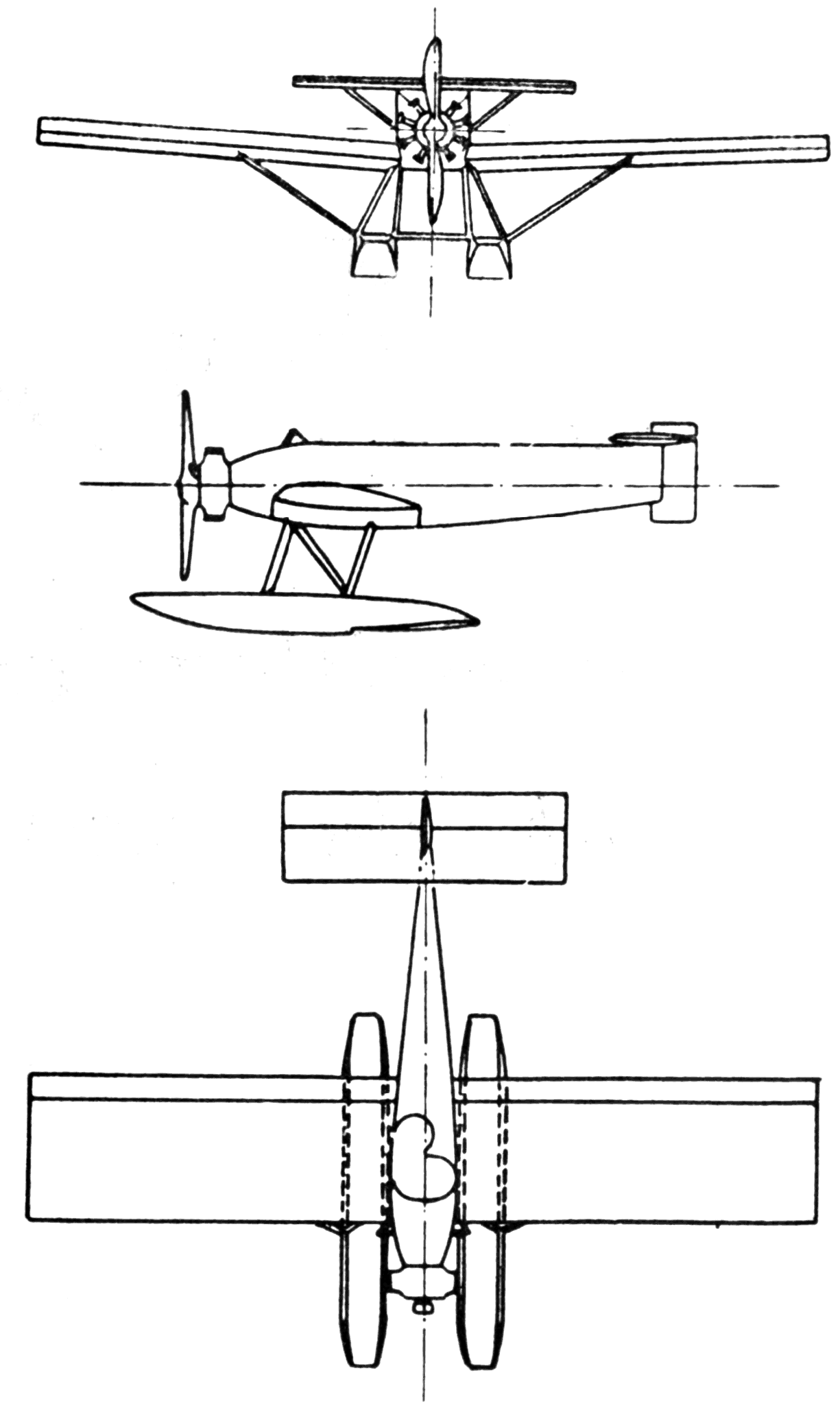
Besson MB.35 3-view drawing from L'Air December 1, 1926

Data from Jane's all the World's Aircraft 1928, Biplanes, Triplanes, and Seaplanes, Submarines with wings : the past, present and future of aircraft-carrying submarines

General characteristics

- Crew: 2
- Length: 7.3 m (23 ft 11 in) wings spread
- Wingspan: 9.85 m (32 ft 4 in) wings spread
- Width: 2.2 m (7 ft 3 in) wings folded for submarine stowage
- Length folded: 6.5 m (21 ft)
- Height: 2.53 m (8 ft 4 in)
- Wing area: 16.5 m^{2} (178 sq ft)
- Empty weight: 540 kg (1,190 lb)
- Gross weight: 765 kg (1,687 lb)
- Powerplant: 1 × Salmson 9AC 9-cylinder air-cooled radial piston engine, 89 kW (120 hp)
- Propellers: 2-bladed fixed pitch propeller

Performance

- Maximum speed: 160 km/h (99 mph, 86 kn)
- Range: 346 km (215 mi, 187 nmi)
- Ferry range: 644 km (400 mi, 348 nmi) with overload tank in rear cockpit
- Service ceiling: 4,800 m (15,700 ft)
- Wing loading: 47.5 kg/m^{2} (9.7 lb/sq ft)
- Power/mass: 0.1174 kW/kg (.0714 hp/lb)

== Bibliography ==
- Morareau, Lucien (March 2000). "Courrier des Lecteurs" [Readers' Letters]. Avions: Toute l'aéronautique et son histoire (in French) (84): 2–3. ISSN 1243-8650.
- Passingham, Malcolm (February 2000). "Les hydravions embarqués sur sous-marins" [Submarine-carried Seaplanes]. Avions: Toute l'aéronautique et son histoire (in French) (83): 7–17. ISSN 1243-8650.
