= Dewoitine D.480 =

French sport and training aircraft

Dewoitine D.48
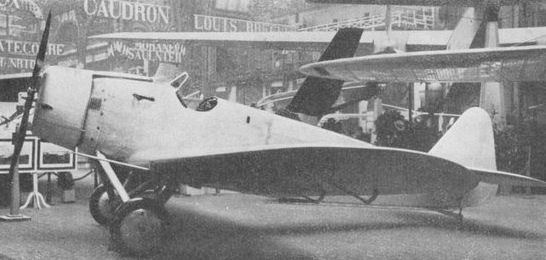

General information
- Type: Side-by-side sport and training aircraft
- National origin: France
- Manufacturer: Constructions Aéronautiques Émile Dewoitine
- Number built: 2

History
- First flight: 1932

The Dewoitine D.480 was a French single engine side-by-side sports and training aircraft built in the early 1930s. Two were completed and flew with several different radial engines. One remained active through the 1950s.

== Design ==
The D.480 was designed to a government programme for a side-by-side trainer for flying schools. It was of mixed construction, with a wooden wing and metal fuselage. Its one-piece cantilever low wing was trapezoidal out to elliptical tips, tapered strongly in thickness from root to tip and had significant dihedral. The wing was built around a single spruce and plywood spar and entirely ply skinned. High aspect ratio ailerons filled over half the trailing edges, with ground-adjustable trimming flaps near the roots.

The metal-skinned fuselage was based on four longerons, giving it a slightly rounded square cross-section. It was always intended that the D.48 series should be able to accommodate a variety of radial engines in the 67–112 kW (90–150 hp) range and the first prototype, type D.480, had a 71 kW (95 hp) Salmson 7Ac seven cylinder engine in the nose, enclosed in a cowling which exposed its cylinder heads for cooling. A second example, designated D.481, was built at the same time as the first and was identical apart from its 75 kW (100 hp) Lorraine 5Pa radial, similarly cowled. Pilot and pupil sat side by side with dual controls in an open cockpit close to the wing leading edge. Behind them the fuselage tapered to a convention tail. The horizontal tail was roughly elliptical in plan and mounted on top of the fuselage, far enough forward to need only a small space between the elevators for rudder movement. Its deep, full rudder was hinged on a blunted triangular fin.

The D.480 had a fixed, conventional undercarriage with a track of 2.80 m (9 ft 2 in). Each mainwheel was mounted on a stub axle at the vertex of a V-strut hinged on the lower fuselage longeron, with a near-vertical sprung leg, with an oleo strut shock absorber, to the wing spar. The tailwheel was on a long, hinged leg close to the rear fuselage with a short, vertical shock absorber.

== Development ==
Both examples had official pre-flight structural checks made in January 1932; the D.481 at least flew that same month. They were registered as F-AKFF and F-AKFG. One of the pair was displayed at the December 1932 Paris Aero Salon after receiving a 101 kW (135 hp) Salmson 9NC nine-cylinder radial, housed under a long-chord, NACA-style cowling. The type number of this variant is not known for certain but recreated French civil aircraft registers show that both spent part of the lives as D.482s.

The register also indicates that one flew for a time as a military aircraft; Dewoitine had argued that it would make a good introductory trainer. It returned to the civil register as F-AQMO in May 1938, operated by an aero club near Toulouse. It survived World War II and in the 1950s, its engine uncowled, carried advertising material for a biscuit manufacturer.

F-AKFG eventually became a type D.483, though little is known about this variant.

== Variants ==
Dewoitine D.480
Salmson 7Ac powered, as described. Registered as F-AKFF.
Dewoitine D.481
75 kW (100 hp) Lorraine 5Pa five cylinder radial engine with three blade propeller. Registered as F-AKFG.
Dewoitine D.482
D.480 and D.481 re-designated.
Dewoitine D.483
Second D.482 re-designated.

== Specifications (D.480) ==
Data from Les Ailes June 1932

General characteristics

- Crew: Two
- Length: 7.395 m (24 ft 3 in)
- Wingspan: 12.700 m (41 ft 8 in)
- Height: 2.830 m (9 ft 3 in)
- Wing area: 19 m^{2} (200 sq ft) including 2 m^{2} (22 sq ft) of fuselage underside
- Empty weight: 646 kg (1,424 lb) equipped, without fuel
- Gross weight: 909 kg (2,004 lb)
- Fuel capacity: 120 L (26 imp gal; 32 US gal)
- Powerplant: 1 × Salmson 7Ac 7-cylinder air-cooled radial, 71 kW (95 hp)
- Propellers: 2-bladed

Performance

- Maximum speed: 175 km/h (109 mph, 94 kn) at ground level
- Minimum control speed: 84 km/h (52 mph, 45 kn)
- Range: 600 km (370 mi, 320 nmi)
- Service ceiling: 4,500 m (14,800 ft)
