= Aviméta 132 =

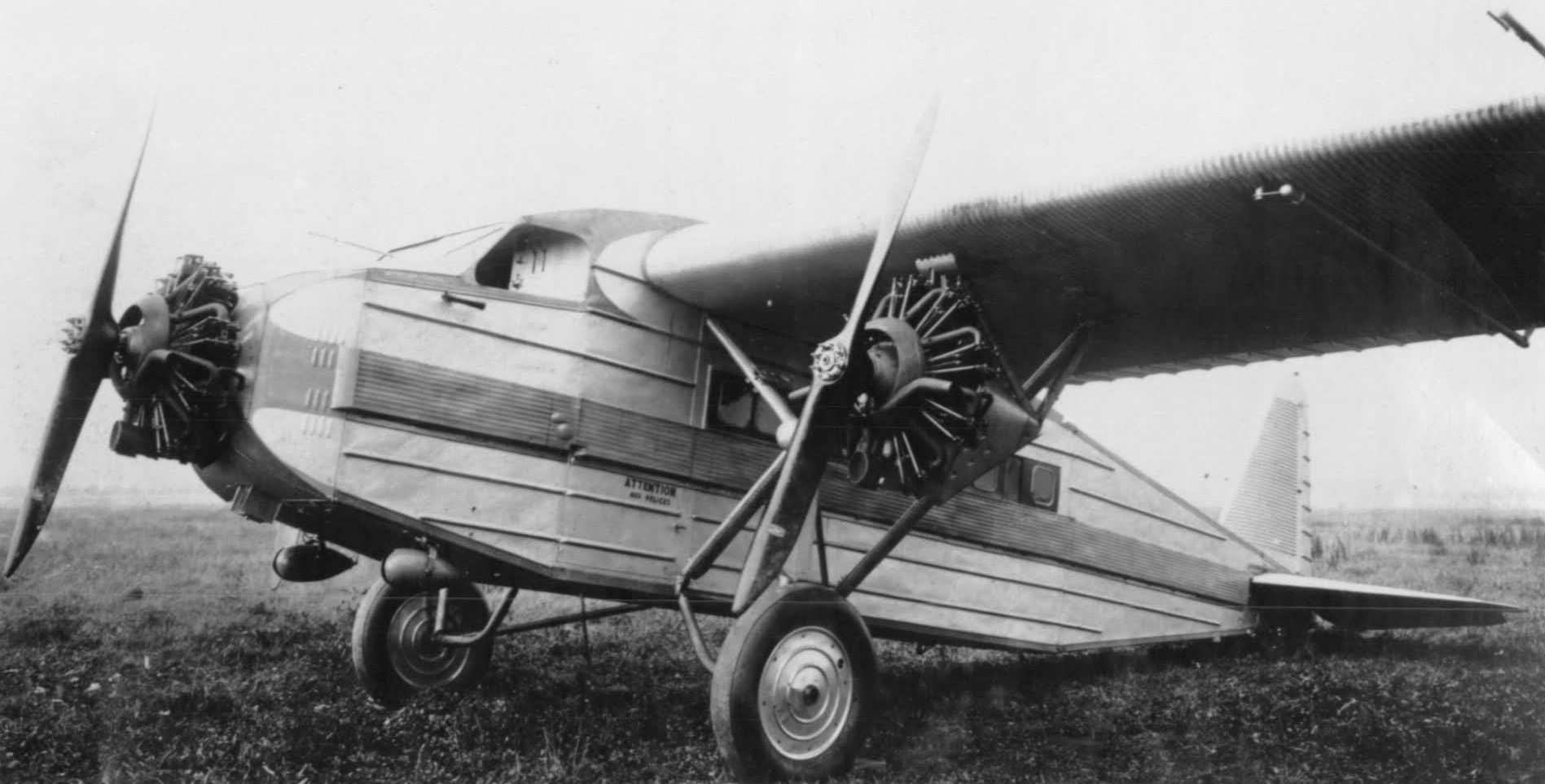

General information
- Type: Eight-passenger transport monoplane
- National origin: France
- Manufacturer: Aviméta (Société pour la Construction d'Avions Métallique )
- Number built: 1

History
- First flight: 1927

The Aviméta 132 was a French three-engined monoplane transport for eight-passengers designed and built by Aviméta (Société pour la Construction d'Avions Métallique ). It was the first French all-metal aircraft but only one aircraft was built.

== Design and development ==
The Aviméta 132 was a high-wing monoplane with a fixed conventional landing gear, powered by three uncowled 230 hp (172 kW) Salmson 9Ab radial air-cooled piston engines. Fuel tanks were built into the wings, fitted with jettison valves to empty the tanks in an emergency. The enclosed cockpit sat two crew with a cabin for eight passengers. It was intended to build both a day and night version but only one aircraft was built and it did not enter production.

== Specifications (day version) ==
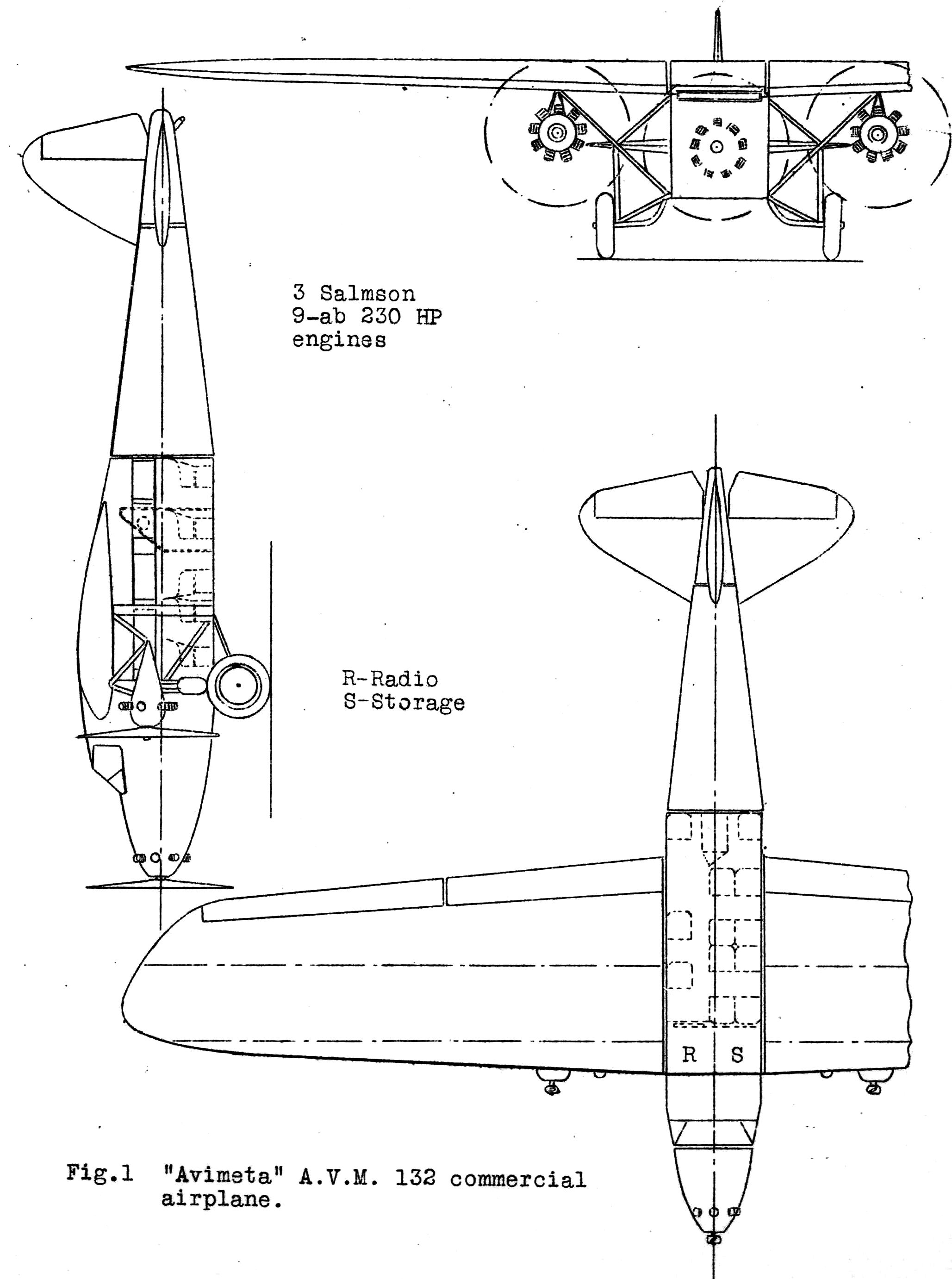
Aviméta 132 3-view drawing from NACA Aircraft Circular No.63

Data from Flight, Jane's all the World's Aircraft 1928, Aviafrance:Avimeta 132

General characteristics

- Crew: 2
- Capacity: 8 pax
- Length: 14.3 m (46 ft 11 in)
- Wingspan: 21.8 m (71 ft 6 in)
- Height: 3.75 m (12 ft 4 in)
- Wing area: 752 m^{2} (8,090 sq ft)
- Empty weight: 2,700 kg (5,952 lb)
- Gross weight: 10,850 kg (23,920 lb)
- Powerplant: 3 × Salmson 9Ab 9-cylinder air-cooled radial piston engines, 170 kW (230 hp) each

Performance

- Maximum speed: 180 km/h (110 mph, 97 kn)
- Cruise speed: 170 km/h (110 mph, 92 kn)
- Range: 900 km (560 mi, 490 nmi)
- Service ceiling: 3,750 m (12,300 ft)
- Time to altitude: 2,000 m (6,600 ft) in 19 minutes
- Wing loading: 68.5 kg/m^{2} (14.0 lb/sq ft)
- Power/mass: 0.1054 kW/kg (0.0641 hp/lb)
