= Albert A-60 =

Single engine, two seat, wooden sports monoplane

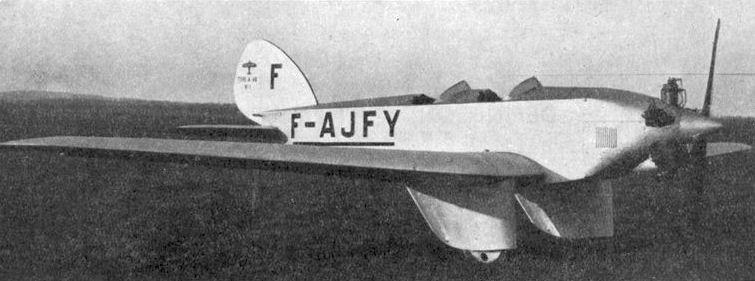
- Albert A-60

General information
- Type: Light sports aircraft
- National origin: France
- Manufacturer: Avions Albert
- Designer: Edouard Albert
- Number built: 2

History
- First flight: Late 1930

The Albert A-60 was a single engine, two seat, wooden sports monoplane designed and built in France in the early 1930s. Two were built and flown with three different engines.

== Design and development ==
The A-60 was an all-wood, low wing cantilever monoplane. Its wing was in three parts, with a rectangular centre section and two outer, gently straight tapered panels with semi-elliptical tips. These outer panels were mounted with 4° of dihedral and carried ailerons each of 3.48 metres (11 ft 5 in) span, occupying most of their trailing edges. The wing was built around two spars and was plywood covered. The A-60's landing gear was of the tailskid type and each independently mounted mainweel was on a robust, rubber sprung, vertical duralumin leg attached to the forward spar of the outer extremities, with a lighter, angled bracing strut to the rear longeron. The gear had a track of 1.90 metres (6 ft 3 in) and was often entirely contained within vertical trouser fairings.

The prototype aircraft was fitted with a 52 kW (70 hp), five cylinder Walter NZ 70 (last modification of NZ-60) radial engine in a rounded nose, with its cylinder heads exposed for cooling. Behind the engine the fuselage, all wood like the wings, was rectangular in section and built around four longerons with plywood surfacing; the upper surface was subdivided longitudinally into a ridge with two sloping faces. There were two open cockpits with small windscreens, one centred at about one-third chord and the other over the trailing edge. Disengagable dual control was fitted. The fuselage tapered towards the tail, where the empennage was conventional. Its parallel chord horizontal tail with rounded tips was placed at mid-fuselage height and there was a quadrant shaped fin and curved rudder hinged at the extreme tail, sloping in below to allow elevator movement. Control surfaces were unbalanced.

The A-60 first flew late in 1930. A second aircraft, the A-61 was built with a more powerful, uncowled 71 kW (95 hp) Salmson 7Ac seven cylinder radial engine. This made its first flight on 9 September 1931. The A-60 was re-engined with a 71 kW (95 hp) Renault 4Pb four cylinder upright inline engine and renamed the A-62. It was flying by September 1931.

The extra power of the two new engines naturally improved performance figures : the A-62 was 30 km/h (19 mph) faster at maximum speed and 25 km/h (16 mph) faster cruising and could reach altitudes 2,800 m (9,200 ft) higher. Its range, though, was 25% less.

== Operational history ==
Only nineteen days after the first flight of the A-62 it was competing in Le concours national d'avions de tourisme (The national contest for touring aircraft) along with the A-61, a Caudron C.232 Luciole and a Guillemin JG-10. Designer Edouard Albert flew the A-61 and Sautereau the A-62. The Guillemain dropped out early and at the end of the initial flying tests the order was Caudron, A-61 and A-62. The final challenge was a 3,000 km (1,900 mi) tour but during the first leg on 5 October the A-62 crashed, killing the engineer Paul Breyrich and seriously injuring Sautereau. At the end of the tour, at Orly on 15 October, the Caudron was the winner and the A-61 in second place.

Not much is known about the later career of the A-61 but in 1999 its remains were rediscovered and it is being restored at the Musée Régional de l'Air at the Angers - Loire Airport in Angers.

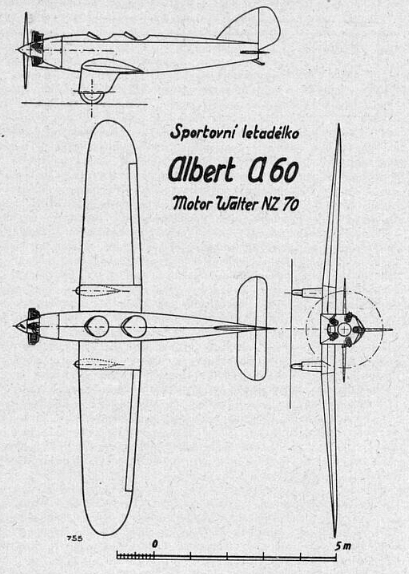
Albert A-60 (3-view drawing from Letectví 1931)

== Variants ==
A-60
First prototype with 52 kW (70 hp) Walter NZ 70 5-cylinder radial engine. First flown late 1930. Later Walter Vega 5-cylinder radial engine 63 kW (85 hp).
A-61
Second prototype with 71 kW (95 hp) Salmson 7Ac radial engine. First flown 9 September 1931.
A-62
First prototype with 71 kW (95 hp) Renault 4Pb 4-cylinder upright inline engine. Flying by September 1931.

== Specifications (A-60) ==
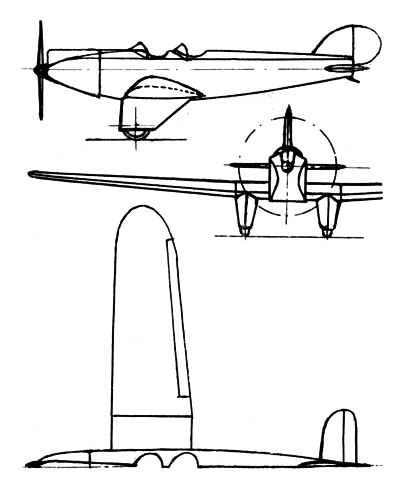
Albert A.62 3-view drawing from L'Aerophile Salon 1932

Data from Les Ailes 25 December 1930, p.3

General characteristics

- Crew: One pilot
- Capacity: One passenger
- Length: 6.99 m (22 ft 11 in)
- Wingspan: 11.45 m (37 ft 7 in)
- Height: 2.65 m (8 ft 8 in)
- Wing area: 15.0 m^{2} (161 sq ft)
- Empty weight: 420 kg (926 lb) equipped
- Gross weight: 750 kg (1,653 lb)
- Powerplant: 1 × Walter NZ 70 , 52 kW (70 hp)
- Propellers: 2-bladed

Performance

- Maximum speed: 172 km/h (107 mph, 93 kn)
- Cruise speed: 160 km/h (99 mph, 86 kn)
- Range: 1,000 km (620 mi, 540 nmi) at cruising speed
- Service ceiling: 4,000 m (13,000 ft) practical
- Time to altitude: 18 mins to 2,000 m (6,600 ft)
- Landing speed: 60 km/h (37 mph)
- anding and take-off distances: less than 100 m (330 ft)
