= Aircraft Engineering Corporation =

Defunct New York company founded in 1919

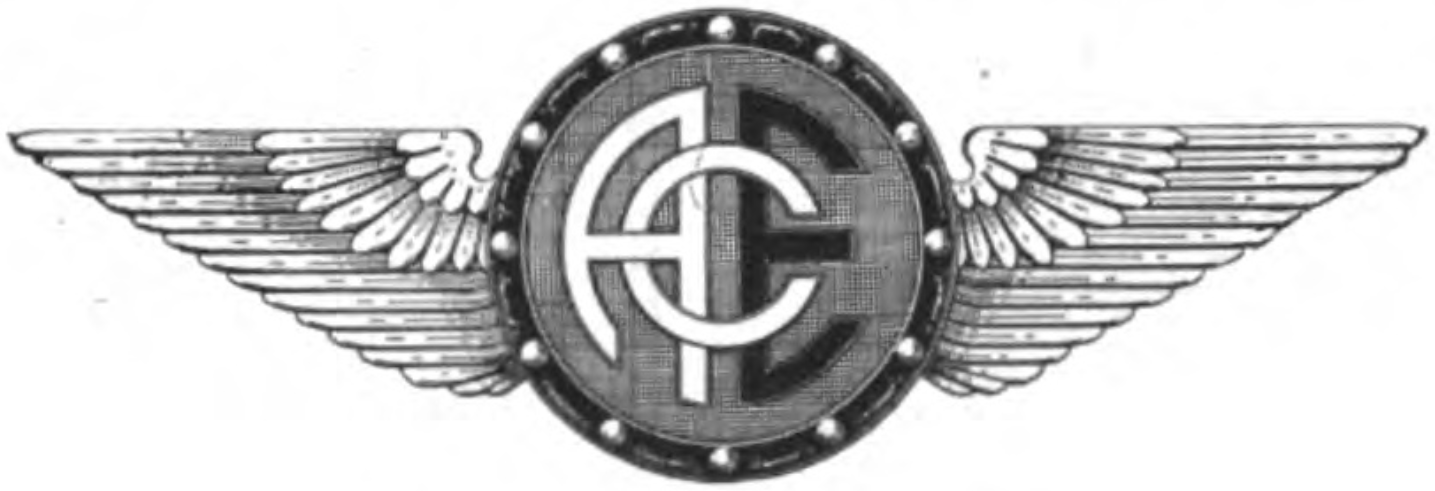
Company logo

The Aircraft Engineering Corp (Ace) was founded in New York in 1919.

The company was sold to Horace Keane of Long Island, New York in 1920. In 1930 it was operating in Oakland, California under the name Aircraft Engineering & Maintenance Co.

Aircraft Engineering Products, Inc. operated in Clifton, N.J.

== Products ==
The corporation's only product was a single-seat biplane known as the Ace K-1.
