= Farman F.90 =

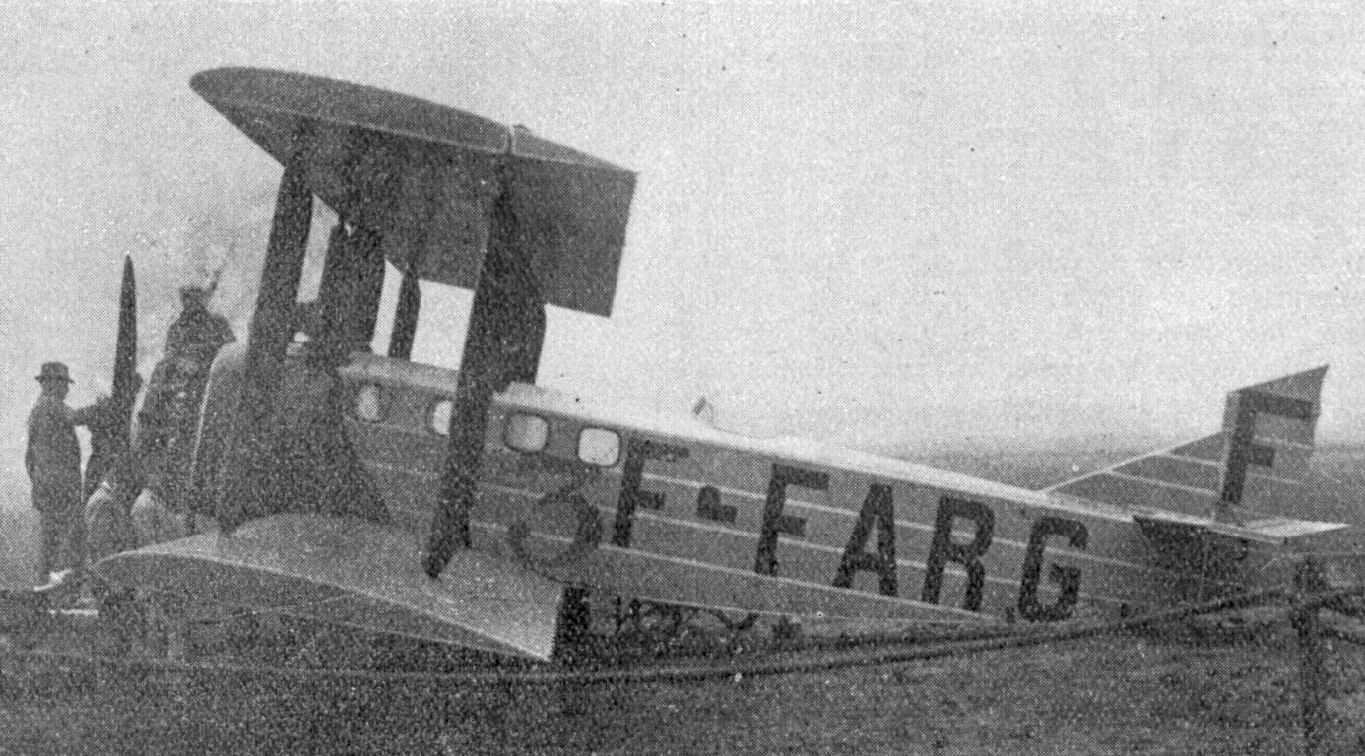

General information
- Type: Small airliner
- National origin: France
- Manufacturer: Farman
- Number built: 1

History
- First flight: 1921

The Farman F.90 was a single engine biplane transport, carrying 6 passengers. It was built and developed in France in the early 1920s. Though it had some competition successes, it was not put into production

== Design and development ==
The F.90 passenger transport appeared in 1921. It was a single engine, single bay biplane with unstaggered, rectangular wings and ailerons on the upper wings only. The interplane gap was large, with the upper plane held high above the fuselage by a set of four vertical centre section struts. The interplane struts were also simple parallel pairs. Its tailplane and elevators were fixed to the top of the fuselage; it had a triangular fin and a rudder with a tip at the same angle but vertically displaced, producing a nick in the leading edge.

The F.90 was initially powered by a 260 hp (194 kW) Salmson AZ 9 9-cylinder radial engine, neatly enclosed in a short nose. The fuselage was deep and flat sided, though with a slightly rounded decking. The passenger compartment, with four small windows on each side, began near the wing leading edge and stretched aft a little beyond the trailing edge. The pilot had an open cockpit behind the cabin with a clear forward view under the high wing. The F.90 had a conventional undercarriage with single mainwheels under the wing leading edges and a rear skid.

Flight trials began in 1921, conducted by Farman pilots Lucien Coupet and Jules Landry. By 1923 the Salmson radials had been updated from the mark AZ to CM for its appearance the Zenith Cup competition of that year. It was re-engined again, this time with 380 hp (283 kW) Bristol Jupiters, for the same competition in 1926. This change came with a new type number, F.91. Only one F.90/1 was built.

== Operational history ==
The F.90/1 won several Cups but no orders. It won the 1922 Grand Prix de Paris, the only single engine aircraft amongst five competitors, where it was flown by Louis Boussoutrot and his mechanic, Henri Carol. This contest included a 600 km (370 mi) circuit, which the F.90 completed at an average speed of 144.4 km/h (89.7 mph), and rewarded Farman with FF 80,000 and a statuette.

It appeared in the Zenith Cup, a fuel consumption competition funded by the Société du carburateur Zénith, twice, winning it both times. This competition required the contestants to make out and return flights from Paris to Lyon and back on successive, prescribed days. The round trip distance was 770 km (480 mi). The winner was the aircraft that used the least fuel for the load it carried, measured by the ratio of weight of fuel used to weight of useful load. In 1923 there were nine entrants, though three were non-starters. On 21–22 July 1923, fitted with its new Salmson CM 9 engines and flown by Boussoutrot, it won with a fuel to load ratio of 0.475, well ahead of the 0.616 of the runner-up, a Potez VIII A two-seater.

Three years later, on 3–4 July, the same machine, now the F.91 with Bristol Jupiters and Bristol Triplex carburettors, was one of seven competitors. The Farman, flown by Maurice Drouhin, won again with a much improved fuel to load ratio of 0.253, though the runner-up, a Caudron was close behind at 0.256. Each win gained Farman the Cup plus the first prize of FF 30,000; in 1926 at least the winning pilot also got FF 3,000.

== Variants ==
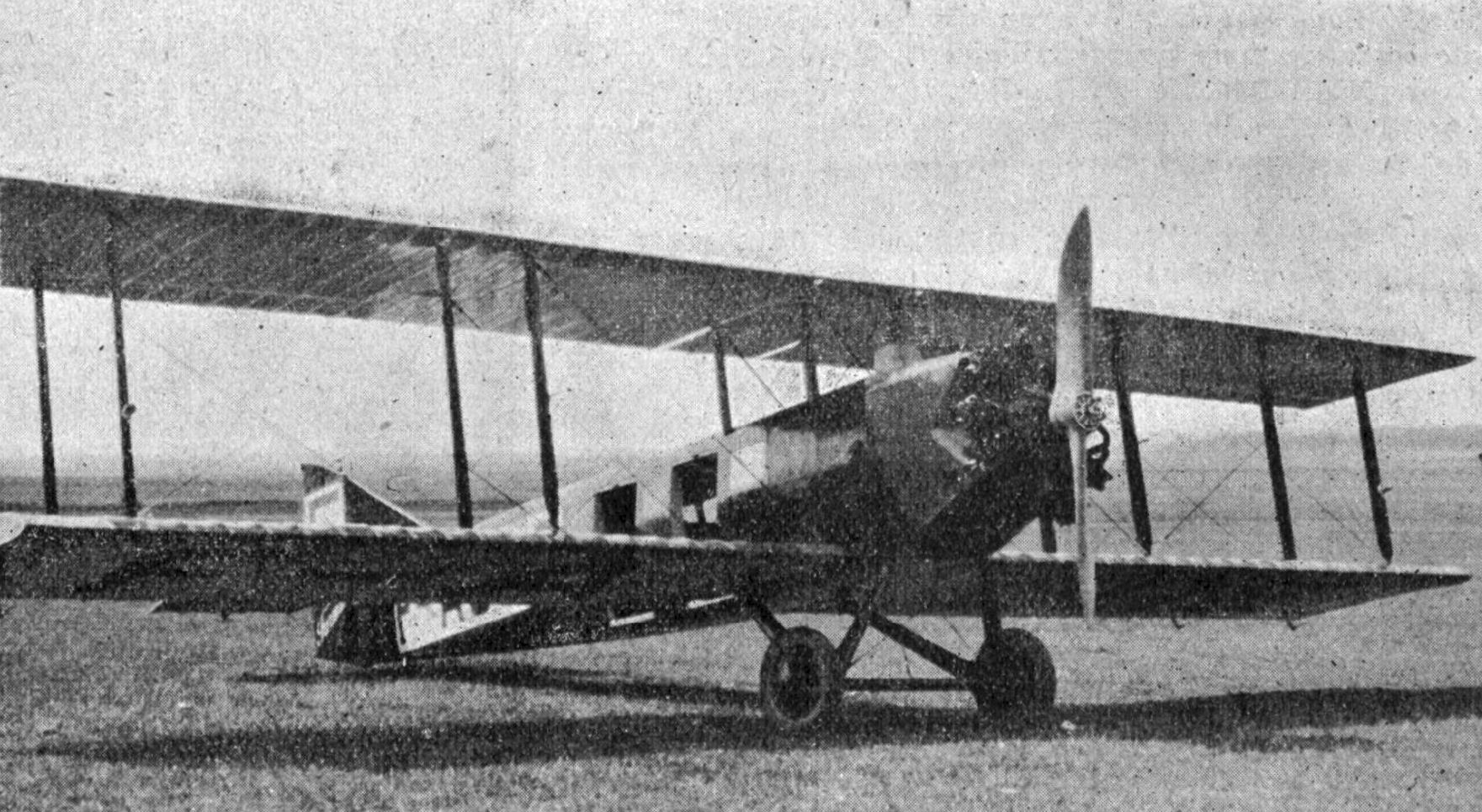
Farman F.91 photo from L'Aérophile June,1926

F.90
Salmson engines
F.91
Bristol Jupiter engine

== Specifications (F. 90, Salmson AZ 9 engines) ==
Data from Les Avions Farnan

General characteristics

- Crew: 1
- Capacity: 6 passengers
- Length: 9.30 m (30 ft 6 in)
- Wingspan: 14.03 m (46 ft 0 in)
- Height: 3.86 m (12 ft 8 in)
- Wing area: 66.80 m^{2} (719.0 sq ft)
- Empty weight: 1,100 kg (2,425 lb)
- Gross weight: 2,350 kg (5,181 lb)
- Powerplant: 1 × Salmson AZ 9 9-cylinder air cooled single row radial, 190 kW (260 hp)
- Propellers: 2-bladed

Performance

- Maximum speed: 180 km/h (110 mph, 97 kn)
- Range: 70 km (43 mi, 38 nmi)
