= Besson MB.411 =

Reconnaissance aircraft by Marcel Besson

MB.411
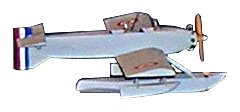
- Model of an MB-411

General information
- Type: observation floatplane
- National origin: France
- Manufacturer: Besson
- Designer: Marcel Besson
- Primary user: French Navy
- Number built: 1 prototype, 2 production

History
- First flight: June 1935
- Developed from: Besson MB.35

The Besson MB.411 was a French two-seat spotter and observation floatplane, designed by Besson.

== Development ==
In 1932, Besson created the MB.410 by replacing the twin floats of the MB.35 with a single main float and two outrigger floats just inboard of the wingtips. The engine was cowled and fuselage streamlining was improved. The prototype was destroyed in a fatal accident during testing.

The French Navy required a spotter aircraft for its new submarine Surcouf, and ordered a production version, designated MB.411. It was specifically designed for housing in a cylindrical hangar in the back of Surcouf's conning tower. The Besson MB.411 could be assembled to put on the wings in about 4 minutes (at open sea up to 20 minutes) after it was removed from its hangar, then lowered to the water and retrieved by a crane. MB.411 was a low-wing monoplane with a large single central float and under the wing two small stabilizing floats. The Besson MB.411 was constructed with a mix of wood and metal, with canvas covering. In autumn of 1934, the MB.411 was sent to Brest for boarding trials on the Surcouf. The aircraft made its first flight at Le Mureau in June 1935. Surcouf then took the Besson MB.411 to the Caribbean arriving in September 1935 for sea trials. In January 1936 MB.411 returned to Mureaux for changes. The second MB.411 was completed in February 1937. The second MB.411 made its first flight December 1937 and was delivered July 1938. The second MB.411 replaced the first in the Surcouf.

== Operational history ==
On June 18, 1940, the Surcouf chose to join the Free French Naval Forces in England. The Surcouf was assigned to the protection of convoys in the Atlantic near Bermuda, but the MB.411, initially nammed "Passe-Partout" (literally "all-purpose") stayed in England, where it gained the name "Petrel", in line with the Royal Navy's practice of naming their planes after seabirds. It made a few flights on the coast of Devon and was damaged in Plymouth in April 1941 during a Luftwaffe bombing raid. It was later repaired, changing its appearance, and used by 765 Naval Air Squadron (765 NAS) from RNAS Sandbanks. The plane was later scrapped at RAF Mount Batten, after having been rendered unserviceable due to lack of spares. The first MB.411 remained in France and was assigned to Fleet Squadron Aeronavale Escadrille 7-S-4 in Saint-Mandrier and was scrapped by the Nazis in France.

== Variants ==
- MB.41 – original prototype powered by a single 101 kW (135 hp) Salmson 9Nc.
- MB-411 – production version intended for operation from submarines but eventually only operated from large warships.

== Operators ==
France

- French Navy

United Kingdom

Royal Navy

One MB-411, nicknamed Petrel.

== Specifications (MB.411) ==
Data from

General characteristics

- Crew: 2
- Length: 8.25 m (27 ft 0 in)
- Wingspan: 12 m (39 ft 4 in)
- Height: 2.85 m (9 ft 4 in)
- Wing area: 22 m^{2} (237 sq ft)
- Empty weight: 760 kg (1,676 lb)
- Gross weight: 1,140 kg (2,513 lb)
- Powerplant: 1 × Salmson 9Nd radial piston , 130 kW (175 hp)

Performance

- Maximum speed: 190 km/h (118 mph, 103 kn)
- Range: 400 km (249 mi, 216 nmi)
- Service ceiling: 5,000 m (16,405 ft)

== See also ==
Aircraft of comparable role, configuration, and era

- Aichi M6A Seiran
- Chyetverikov SPL
- Loening XSL-1
- Parnall Peto
- Yokosuka E14Y

Related lists

- List of Interwar military aircraft
- List of aircraft of World War II
- List of submarine-borne aircraft

== Bibliography ==
- Demerliac, Alain (May 2000). "Courrier des Lecteurs" [Readers' Letters]. Avions: Toute l'Aéronautique et son histoire (in French) (86): 3. ISSN 1243-8650.
- Morareau, Lucien (March 2000). "Courrier des Lecteurs" [Readers' Letters]. Avions: Toute l'Aéronautique et son histoire (in French) (84): 2–3. ISSN 1243-8650.
- Passingham, Malcolm (February 2000). "Les hydravions embarqués sur sous-marins" [Submarine-carried Seaplanes]. Avions: Toute l'Aéronautique et son histoire (in French) (83): 7–17. ISSN 1243-8650.
- Marchand, Alain; Huan, Claude; Gaillard, Pierre (January 1996). ""Passe-Partout", l'avion du sous-marin". Le Fana de l'Aviation (314): 12–24.
- The Putnam Aeronautical Review, edited by John Motum, p. 50-51.
