= Aircraft Engineering Corp Ace K-1 =

1918 United States single-seat biplane aircraft

Ace K-1
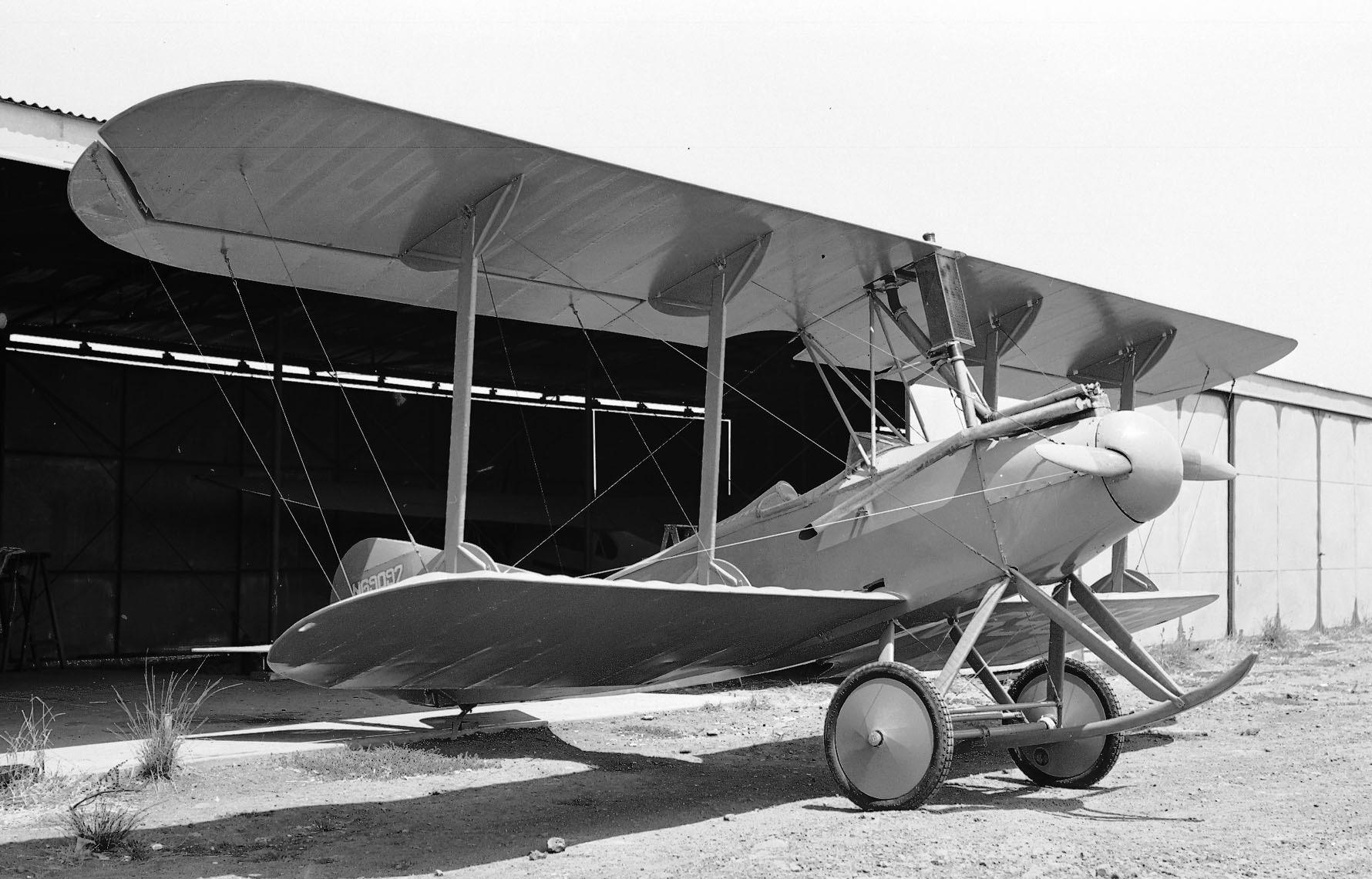

General information
- Type: Sport Biplane
- Manufacturer: Aircraft Engineering Corp / Horace Keane Aeroplanes
- Designer: Alexander Klemin
- Number built: 8x K-1 + One each of Ace 200 and Ace 300

History
- First flight: 1919

The Aircraft Engineering Corp Ace K-1 was a United States single-seat biplane aircraft designed in 1918 by Alexander Klemin, then professor of Aeronautical Engineering at New York University (NYU). It was the first American civil aircraft to be produced after World War I. Later versions included a nearly faired-in engine installation. The aircraft was re-introduced in 1930 with a re-designed fuselage and strengthened structure as the Ace 300 and Ace 200, fitted with Salmson 9Ad and LeBlond 5D engines, respectively.

One example survives, powered by a 40 horsepower (30 kW) Keane Acemotor, and is displayed at the Cradle of Aviation Museum in Garden City, New York.

== Variants ==
Ace K-1
Early production aircraft powered by Ford Model T engines.
Ace 200
Later production aircraft powered by a LeBlond 5D engine.
Ace 300
Later production aircraft powered by a Salmson 9Ad engine.

== Specifications (K-1) ==
Data from

General characteristics

- Length: 19 ft 2 in (5.84 m)
- Wingspan: 28 ft 4 in (8.64 m)
- Powerplant: 1 × Ford Model T 4-cyl in-line water-cooled piston engine, 40 hp (30 kW)

Performance

- Maximum speed: 63 mph (101 km/h, 55 kn)
- Range: 160 mi (260 km, 140 nmi)
