= Caudron C.240 =

Four-seat touring aircraft produced in France in 1931

C.240
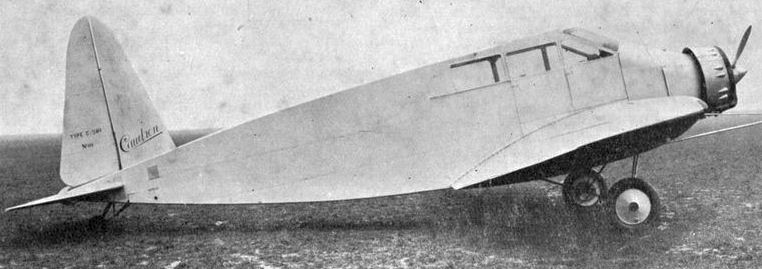

General information
- Type: Touring
- Manufacturer: Caudron
- Designer: Paul Deville
- Number built: 1

History
- Manufactured: 1931
- First flight: 1931

The Caudron C.240 was a four-seat touring aircraft produced in France in 1931. It was a single-engined, low-wing, cantilever monoplane constructed using wood and metal. It had fixed, conventional landing gear.

It was presented for official tests at the STAé but it did not respond well to control input and did not receive its Certificate of Airworthiness. Caudron were unable to find customers so further development was abandoned.

== Specifications ==
Data from

General characteristics

- Crew: One pilot
- Capacity: 3 passengers
- Length: 10.05 m (33 ft 0 in)
- Wingspan: 15 m (49 ft 3 in)
- Height: 3 m (9 ft 10 in)
- Wing area: 32.8 m^{2} (353 sq ft)
- Empty weight: 800 kg (1,764 lb)
- Gross weight: 1,300 kg (2,866 lb)
- Powerplant: 1 × Salmson 9Ac 9-cylinder air-cooled radial piston engine, 89 kW (120 hp)

Performance

- Maximum speed: 165 km/h (103 mph, 89 kn)
- Range: 650 km (400 mi, 350 nmi)
- Service ceiling: 3,500 m (11,500 ft)
