= Rigault RP.01B =

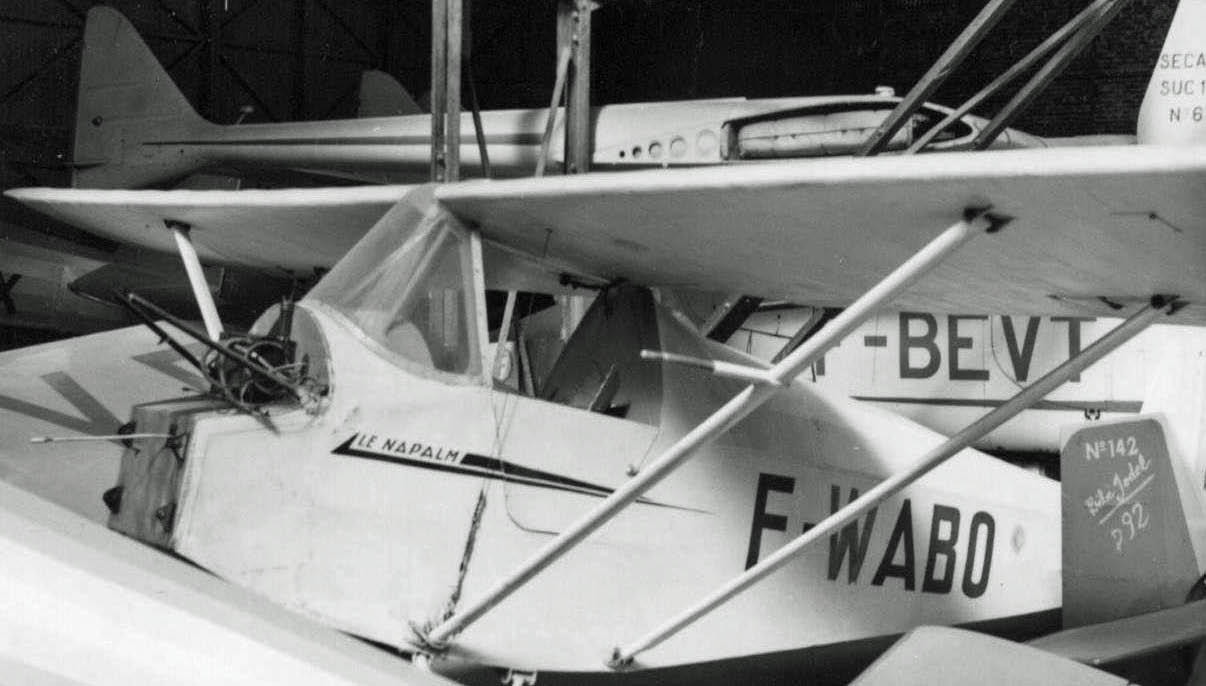
- The RP.01B "Le Napalm" under construction at Mitry-Mory airfield near Paris in May 1957

General information
- Type: light single-seat
- National origin: France
- Manufacturer: Paul Rigault
- Designer: Paul Rigault
- Status: No longer extant
- Primary user: the builder
- Number built: One

History
- Introduction date: 1958
- First flight: 1958

The Rigault RP.01B was a French-built high-wing single-engined ultralight aircraft of the 1950s.

== Development ==
The RP.01B was a one-off aircraft which was designed and built by Monsieur Paul Rigault at Mitry-Mory airfield to the NE of Paris. The airfield now forms part of the site of Paris-Charles de Gaulle airport.

The aircraft was fitted with high-set wings which were supported by twin struts, a fixed tailwheel undercarriage and a single seat for the pilot owner. It was powered by a nine-cylinder Salmson 9 ADB air-cooled radial engine. It was of conventional wooden construction with plywood and fabric-covered fuselage and fabric-covered wings and control surfaces.

== Operational history ==
M. Rigault completed the aircraft during 1958 and named it "Le Napalm". He flew it regularly until at least early 1965. The RP.01B is no longer extant.

== Specifications (RP.01B) ==
Data from Green, 1965

General characteristics

- Crew: 1
- Wingspan: 25 ft 3 in (7.70 m)
- Gross weight: 714 lb (324 kg)
- Powerplant: 1 × Salmson 9 ADB , 45 hp (34 kW)
