= Farman F.280 =

F.280

General information
- Type: Mail plane
- National origin: France
- Manufacturer: Farman, Boulogne-Billancourt
- Number built: 2

History
- First flight: February 1931

The Farman F.280 was a three engine, cantilever wing monoplane designed in France as a mail carrier in the early 1930s. Underpowered and slow, only two were built and briefly used.

== Design and development ==
The F.280 was a relative, though not a member of, the F.190/290/390 family of small transport aircraft by its use of a F.190 wing. The high wing was, though, modified to carry two of the F.280's three engines on its upper surface; its span of 14.38 m (47 ft 2 in) made it a smaller aircraft than the near contemporary three-engined F.300.

Structurally, the wing was built around two spars. Over most of the span the wings had parallel chord but the outermost section, where the ailerons were carried, tapered to straight tips. A pair of parallel aluminium struts inside streamlined spruce fairings took lift and drag loads to the lower fuselage longerons. There were additional vertical struts, small ones as on the F.190 but more sturdy ones under the outboard engines. The empennage of the F.280 was also similar to that of the F.190, with a double strutted rectangular tailplane carrying separate elevators, with a rudder cut-out between them. This deep rudder, tabbed and horn balanced was likewise square edged, mounted on a very wide chord, shallow, straight edged fin.

The F.280 had a flat sided fuselage with the pilot's cabin under the wing, the windscreen just forward of the wings, with the third engine mounted in the nose. Square windows lit the interior. The conventional undercarriage had main legs attached vertically to the forward wing struts as extensions of the struts between the latter and the engines and with slimmer bracing to the upper fuselage longerons. Split axles hinged at the lower fuselage centre and radius arms from the lower longerons took the longitudinal loads. The single mainwheels were spatted.

== Operational history ==
The F.280 flew for the first time in February 1931. With one of its three engines out, it could maintain altitude at 1,000 m and 145 km/h, carrying a load of 300 kg. It was slow to climb to 300 m, though, so in August 1932 the Salmson radials were replaced by the newer Renault 4Pb, air-cooled, inline engines. These produced the same power but turned faster, and the resulting model F.281 was 40 kg (88 lb) lighter. It was purchased by SGTA as a night mail carrier in October 1932 and was tested on the Paris-Berlin route, which connected via Cologne to Sweden. Journey time was 4 h 55 min.

In mid-1933 several airlines, SGTA amongst them, joined to form Air France. The F.280 flew little if at all with the new organisation; by Spring 1935 it had only logged 24 hours of flight, with just 4 hours since January 1933. It never received a route certificate and was always too slow but it was used to investigate aspects of the continental network.

In the hope of higher speeds Farman built a second F.280 series aircraft, the F.282, which had 105 kW (141 hp) Renault 4Pei Bengali engines, inverted and uprated versions of those of the F.281. Despite the extra power, maximum speed was only increased by 10 km/h (6.2 mph). It was tested by the Société Central pour l'Exploitation de Lignes Aériennes in July 1933, who found it precise to fly but still underpowered. As a result, no more F.280 series were built and development of the two existing machines ceased. Records from Air France show the F.282 as still on their books in December 1934, but says nothing of its use.

== Variants ==
F.280
3×Salmson 7Ac 7-cylinder radial engines, 70 kW (94 hp) each: 1 only (F-ALKR).
F.281
3×Renault 4Pb 4-cylinder upright air-cooled inline engines 70 kW (94 hp): F-ALKR re-engined August 1932.
F.282
3×Renault 4Pei Bengali 4-cylinder inverted air-cooled inline engines 105 kW (141 hp): 1 only.

== Units using F.280/281 ==
- Société Générale de Transport Aérien (SGTA)
- Air France

== Specifications ==
Data from Les avions Farman pp.228-9

General characteristics

- Crew: 3
- Length: 10.50 m (34 ft 5 in)
- Wingspan: 14.38 m (47 ft 2 in)
- Height: 3.10 m (10 ft 2 in)
- Wing area: 40.20 m^{2} (432.7 sq ft)
- Empty weight: 1,360 kg (2,998 lb)
- Gross weight: 2,240 kg (4,938 lb)
- Powerplant: 3 × Salmson 7Ac 7-cylinder air-cooled radial, 71 kW (95 hp) each
- Propellers: 2-bladed

Performance

- Maximum speed: 220 km/h (140 mph, 120 kn)
- Range: 575 km (357 mi, 310 nmi)
- Service ceiling: 5,000 m (16,000 ft)

== Bibliography ==
- Liron, Jean (1984). Les avions Farman. Collection Docavia. Vol. 21. Paris: Éditions Larivière. OCLC 37146471.
