= Morane-Saulnier MS.315 =

French monoplane

MS.315
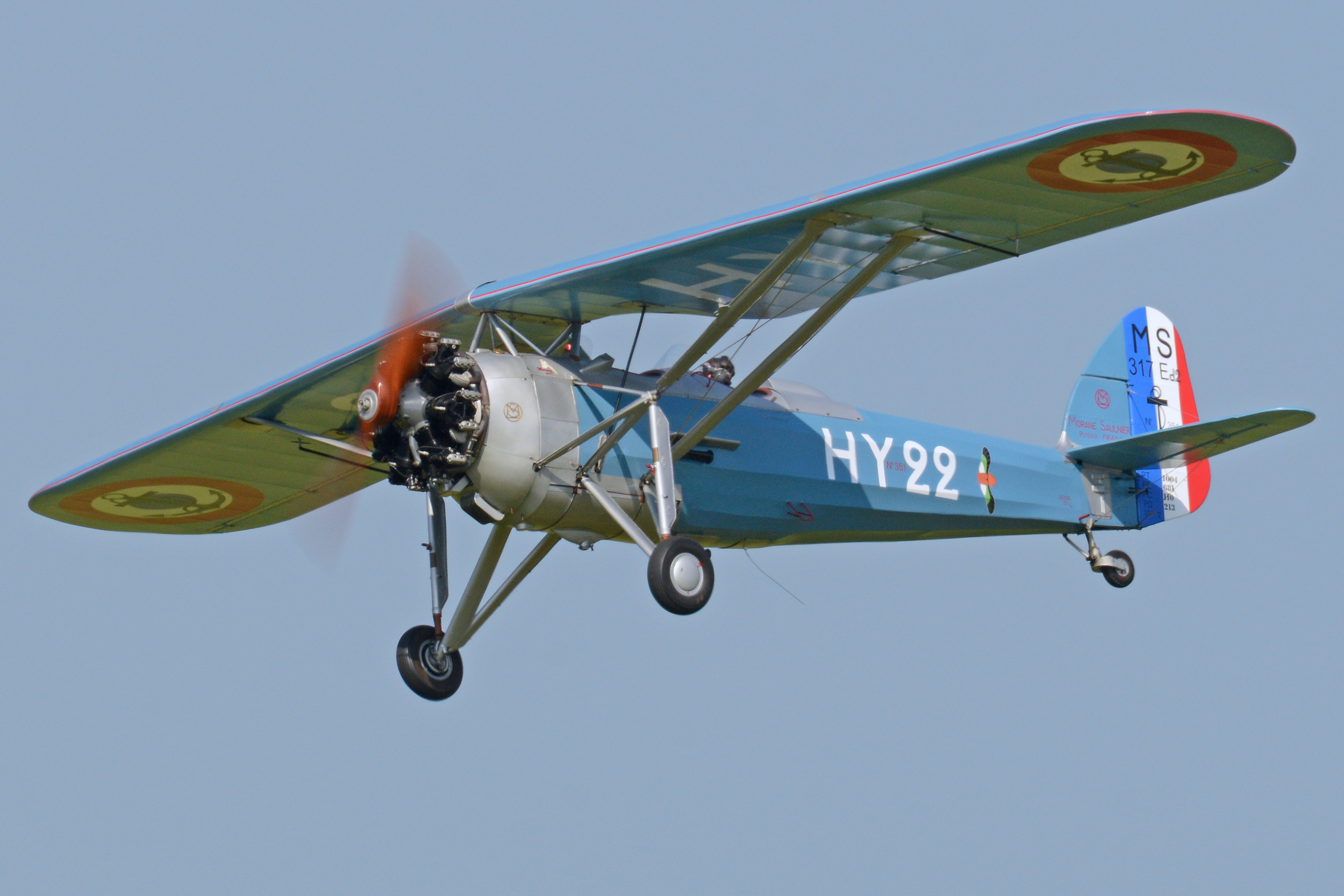
- Morane-Saulnier MS.317

General information
- Type: Primary trainer
- National origin: France
- Manufacturer: Morane-Saulnier
- Primary user: French Air Force
- Number built: 356

History
- First flight: 1932
- Developed from: Morane-Saulnier MS.300

The Morane-Saulnier MS.315 was a primary training monoplane designed and built in France by Morane-Saulnier.

== Development ==
The MS.315 was developed from the earlier MS.300 primary trainer and related variants and first flew in October 1932. The MS.315 is a parasol-wing monoplane with a tailskid, with divided main landing gear, and powered by a 135 hp (101 kW) Salmson 9Nc radial engine. A production run of 346 aircraft followed the four prototypes (including 33 built after the Second World War). Five high-powered MS.317/2 variants were also produced for the civil market, and a single MS.316 was built, powered by a Régnier inverted Vee engine.

In the 1960s 40 MS.315 used as civil glider tugs were modified with a 220 hp (164 kW) Continental W670-K radial engine and re-designated the MS.317.

== Variants ==
MS.315
Production version with a 135hp (101kW) Salmson 9Nc radial engine, 350 built.
MS.315/2
Higher powered civil version, five built.
MS.316
Variant powered by a Regnier inverted Vee engine, one built.
MS.317
1960s conversions with a 220hp (164kW) Continental W670-K radial engine, 40 converted.

== Operators ==
France

- French Air Force
- French Navy

Peru

- Peruvian Air Force

== Specifications (MS.315) ==
Data from

General characteristics

- Crew: 2
- Length: 7.60 m (24 ft 11.25 in)
- Wingspan: 12.00 m (39 ft 4.5 in)
- Height: 2.80 m (9 ft 2.25 in)
- Wing area: 21.60 m^{2} (232.51 sq ft)
- Empty weight: 548 kg (1,208 lb)
- Gross weight: 860 kg (1,896 lb)
- Powerplant: 1 × Salmson 9Nc radial engine , 101 kW (135 hp)

Performance

- Maximum speed: 170 km/h (106 mph, 92 kn)
- Service ceiling: 5,500 m (18,045 ft)

== See also ==
Related lists

- List of Interwar military aircraft
- List of military aircraft of France
