= Morvillers-Saint-Saturnin =

- Commune
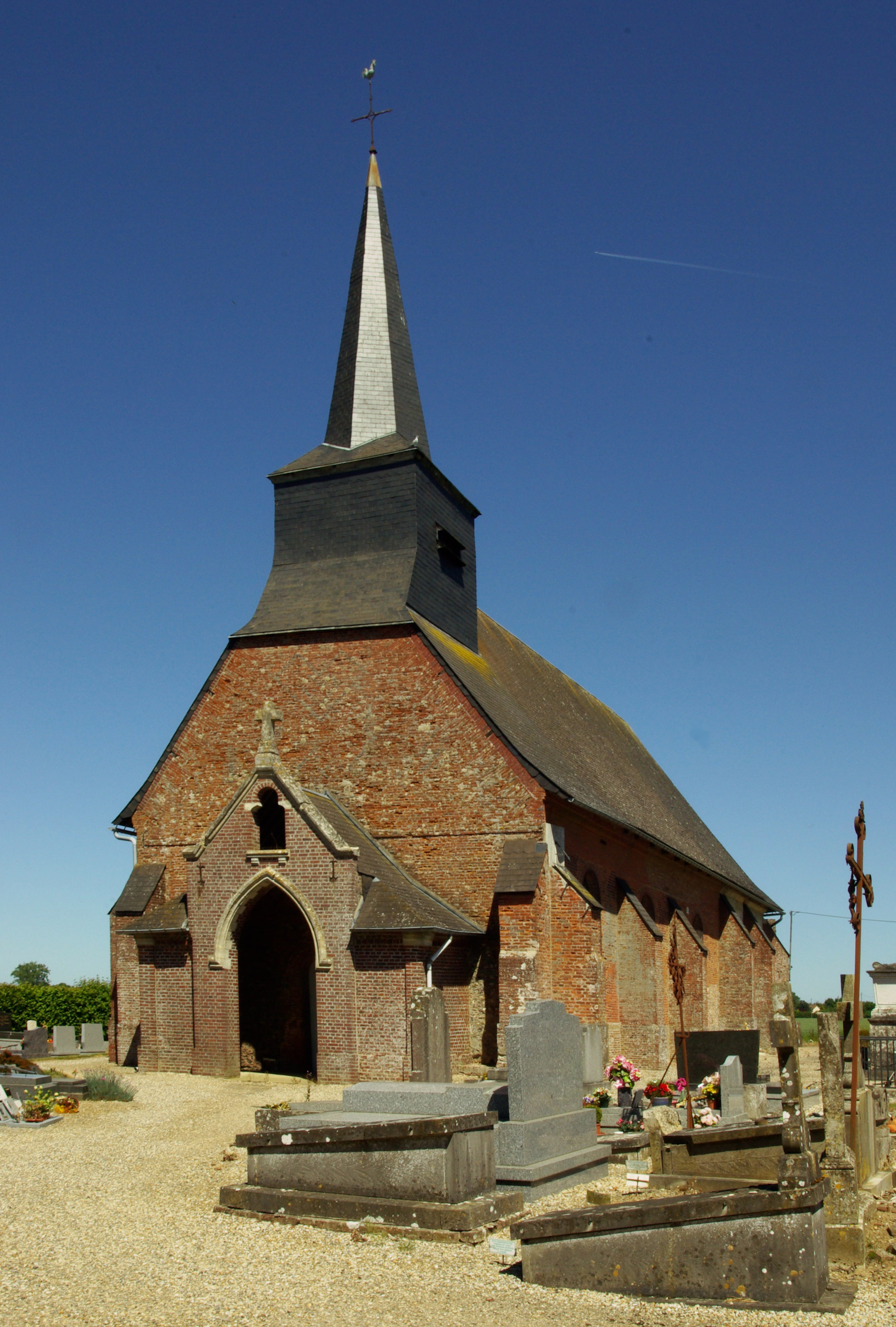
- The church in Morvillers

- Coat of arms
- Location of Morvillers-Saint-Saturnin
- Location within France Location within Hauts-de-France
- Coordinates: 49°46′53″N 1°49′35″E
- Country: France
- Region: Hauts-de-France
- Department: Somme
- Arrondissement: Amiens
- Canton: Poix-de-Picardie
- Intercommunality: CC Somme Sud-Ouest

Government
  - Mayor (2020–2026): Anthony Guichard
- Area^{1}: 12.78 km^{2} (4.93 sq mi)
- Elevation: 200 m (660 ft)
- Highest elevation: 216 m (709 ft)
- Lowest elevation: 188 m (617 ft)
- Population (2023): 372
  - Density: 29.1/km^{2} (75.4/sq mi)
- Time zone: UTC+01:00 (CET)
  - Summer (DST): UTC+02:00 (CEST)
- INSEE/Postal code: 80573 /80290
- ^{1} French Land Register data, which excludes lakes, ponds, glaciers > 1 km^{2} (0.386 sq mi or 247 acres) and river estuaries.

Morvillers-Saint-Saturnin (Picard: Morvilé-Saint-Saturnin) is a commune in the Somme department in Hauts-de-France in northern France.

== Geography ==
The commune is situated on the D18 road, some 27 miles (43 km) southwest of Amiens.

== Population ==
Historical population
Year	Pop.	±% p.a.
1968	374	—
1975	322	−2.12%
1982	350	+1.20%
1990	385	+1.20%
1999	360	−0.74%
2007	357	−0.10%
2012	418	+3.21%
2017	406	−0.58%
2023	372	−1.45%
Source: INSEE

== See also ==
- Communes of the Somme department
