= Salmson air-cooled aero-engines =

Aircraft engine family

Salmson 9
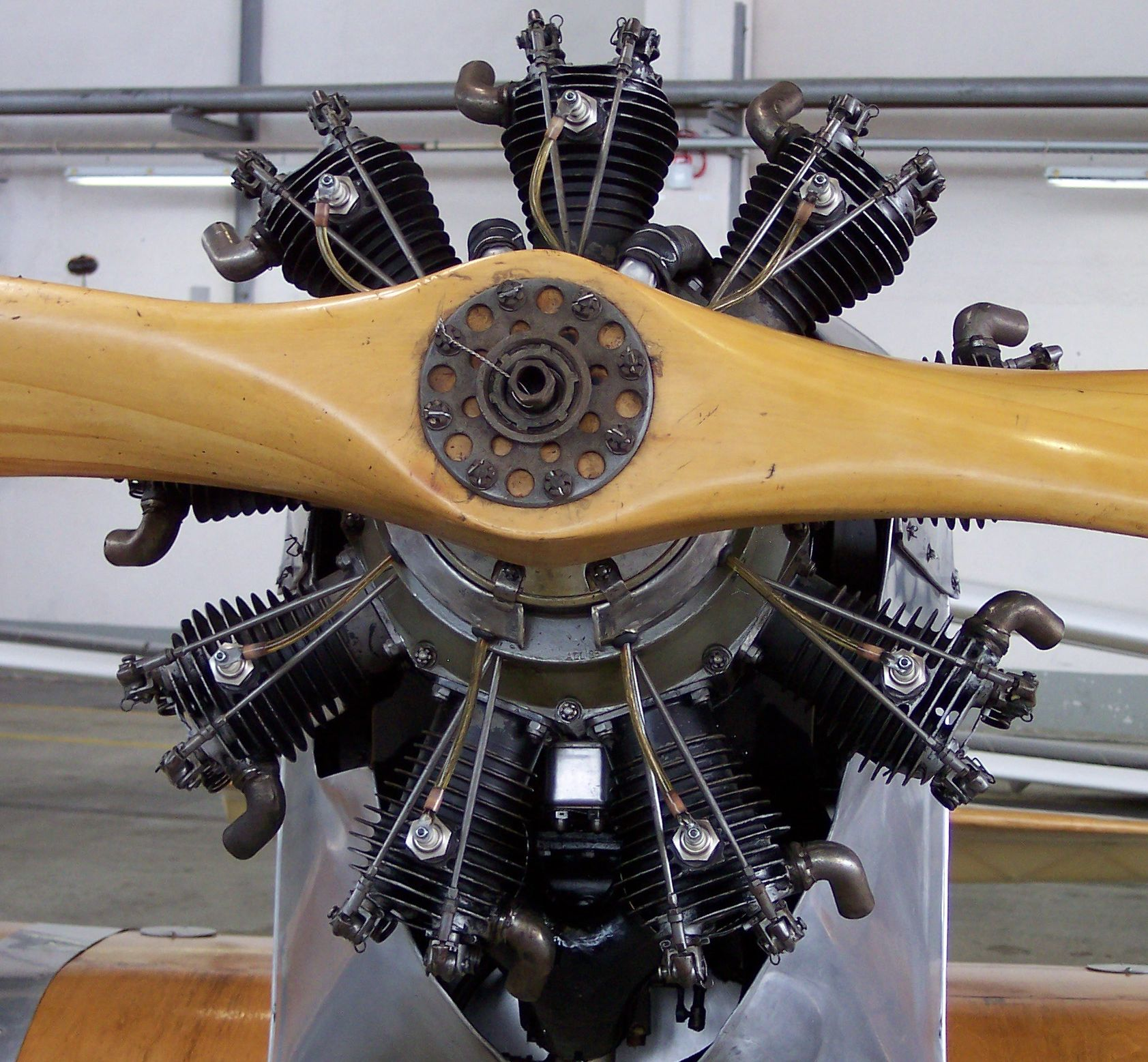
- Salmson 9Ad
- Type: Radial engine
- Manufacturer: Société des Moteurs Salmson
- First run: 1917

Between 1920 and 1951 the Société des Moteurs Salmson in France developed and built a series of widely used air-cooled aircraft engines.

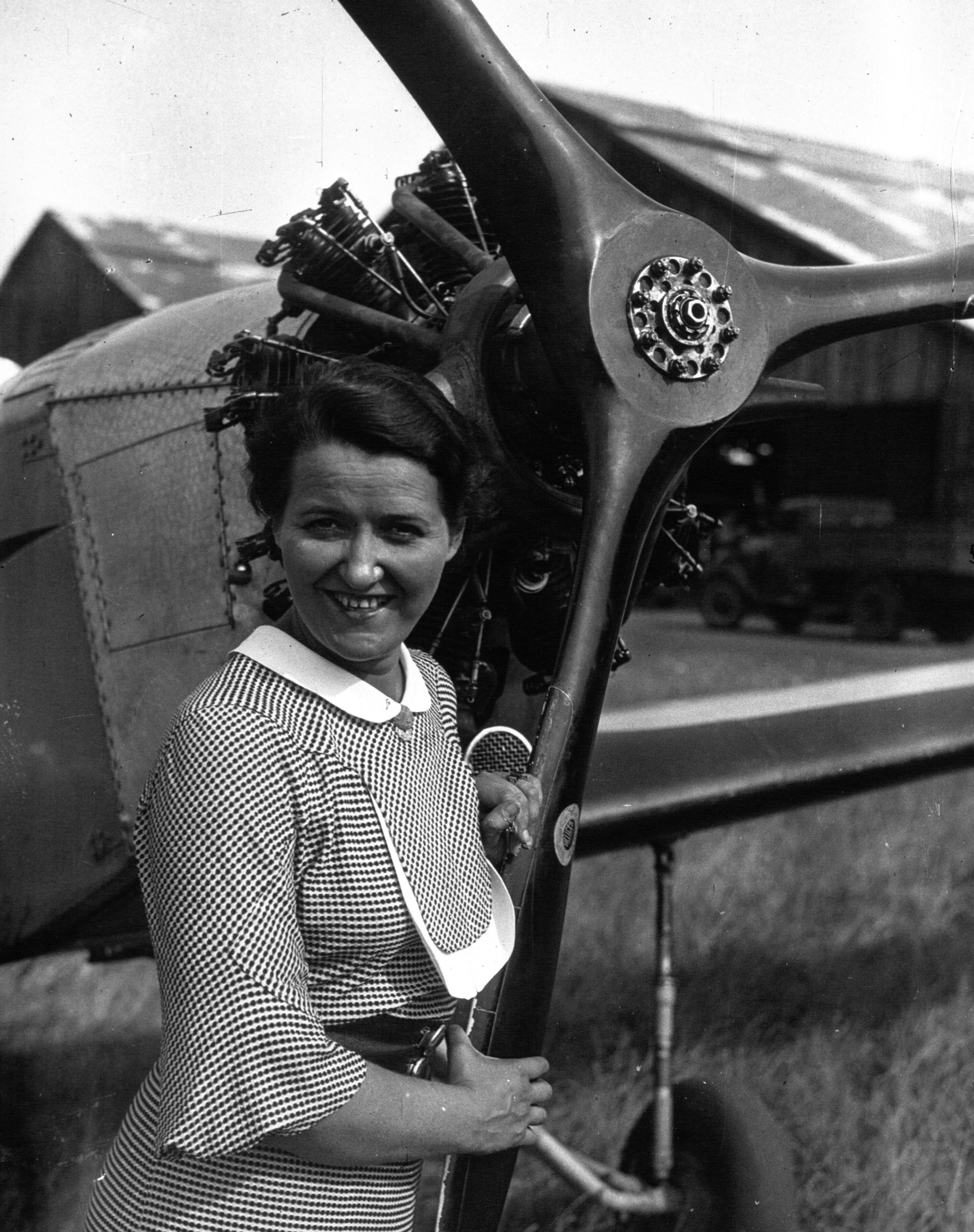
Maryse Hilsz holding the propeller of her Mauboussin M.122 with Salmson 9 Aé.RS, 1935

== Design and development ==
After their successful water-cooled radial engines, developed from 1908 to 1918, Salmson changed their focus to air-cooling to reduce weight and increase specific power (power per unit weight). The majority of the engines produced by Salmson were of radial type with a few other arrangements such as the Salmson T6.E. In common with other engines produced by this manufacturer, the air-cooled radial engines featured the unorthodox Canton-Unné internal arrangement that dispensed with a master rod in favour of a cage of epicyclic gears driving the crankpin. Production ended in 1951 with the liquidation of the manufacturing company.

== British Salmson ==
The 3,7 and 9 cylinder Salmsons were license-built in Great Britain, during the 1920s and 1930s, by the British Salmson engine company as the British Salmson AD.3, British Salmson AC.7, British Salmson AC.9, and British Salmson AD.9.

== Salmson post-WWI engines ==
In common with several other French aero-engine manufacturers Salmson named their engines with the number of cylinders then a series letter in capitals followed by variant letters in lower-case. Engines not included in the 1932 table which follows are listed here:

3AD
9 kW (12 hp) at 1800 rpm rated
5Ac
90 kW (120 hp)
5Ap-01
60 kW (80 hp)
5Aq-01
65 kW (87 hp)
6Ad
6Af
6TE
130 kW (170 hp) inline engine
6TE.S
130 kW (170 hp) inline engine
7Ac
70 kW (94 hp)
7Aq
100 kW (130 hp)
7M
7Om
8As
Argus As 10 inline engine
9Ac
30 kW (40 hp)
9AB
150 kW (200 hp) at 1500 rpm rated
9ABa
210 kW (280 hp)
9ABc
170 kW (230 hp)
9Az
220 kW (300 hp) at 1500 rpm rated
9A2c
180 kW (240 hp)
9M
89 kW (120 hp)
9Nd
130 kW (175 hp)
9Ne
130 kW (170 hp)
9Ng
150 kW (200 hp)
9Nh
150 kW (200 hp)
9P
70 kW (94 hp)
9Y
11B
12C
190 kW (250 hp) W-12 engine
18Z
450 kW (600 hp)
Salmson-Szydlowski SH18
18 cylinder air-cooled 2-stroke radial

Salmson air-cooled engines available in 1932 are listed here

Name	Type	Year	Bore	Stroke	Capacity	Power	Weight
7AC	7-cyl radial		100 mm (3.94 in)	130 mm (5.12 in)	7.150 L (436.3 cu in)	78 kW (105 hp) at 1,800 rpm	130 kg (290 lb)
9AB	9-cyl radial		125 mm (4.92 in)	170 mm (6.69 in)	18.765 L (1,145.1 cu in)	190 kW (250 hp) at 1,700 rpm	265 kg (584 lb)
9AC	9-cyl radial		100 mm (3.94 in)	130 mm (5.12 in)	9.189 L (560.7 cu in)	97 kW (130 hp) at 1,800 rpm	170 kg (370 lb)
9AD	9-cyl radial		70 mm (2.76 in)	86 mm (3.39 in)	2.979 L (181.8 cu in)	34 kW (45 hp) at 2,000 rpm	68 kg (150 lb)
9ADb	9-cyl radial		70 mm (2.76 in)	86 mm (3.39 in)	2.979 L (181.8 cu in)	41 kW (55 hp) at 2,200 rpm	74 kg (163 lb)
9ADr	9-cyl radial		70 mm (2.76 in)	86 mm (3.39 in)	2.979 L (181.8 cu in)	48 kW (65 hp) at 2,700 rpm	79 kg (174 lb)
9NA	9-cyl radial		140 mm (5.51 in)	160 mm (6.30 in)	22.140 L (1,351.1 cu in)	250 kW (330 hp) at 1,800 rpm	292 kg (644 lb)
9NAs	9-cyl radial		140 mm (5.51 in)	160 mm (6.30 in)	22.140 L (1,351.1 cu in)	340 kW (450 hp) at 1,800rpm	315 kg (694 lb)
9NC	9-cyl radial		100 mm (3.94 in)	140 mm (5.51 in)	9.900 L (604.1 cu in)	110 kW (150 hp) at 1,800 rpm	155 kg (342 lb)
9NCt	9-cyl radial		100 mm (3.94 in)	140 mm (5.51 in)	9.900 L (604.1 cu in)	130 kW (170 hp) at 1,800 rpm	165 kg (364 lb)
18AB	18-cyl 2-row radial		125 mm (4.92 in)	180 mm (7.09 in)	39.761 L (2,426.4 cu in)	410 kW (550 hp) at 1,700 rpm	450 kg (990 lb)
18ABs	18-cyl 2-row radial		125 mm (4.92 in)	180 mm (7.09 in)	39.761 L (2,426.4 cu in)	480 kW (650 hp) at 1,700 rpm	465 kg (1,025 lb)

== Applications ==
=== Nine cylinder engines ===
9AB

- Aviméta 132
- Bernard SIMB AB 16
- Blériot 135
- Blériot 290
- Boisavia B.604 Mercurey II
- Farman F.166
- Farman F.310
- Hanriot H.436
- Loire 30
- Loire 501
- Morane-Saulnier MS.130
- Morane-Saulnier MS.230
- Morane-Saulnier MS.237
- Morane-Saulnier MS.502
- Potez 33/2
- Romano R.82
- Romano R.83
- SET 3
- SNCAO 30
- TNCA Serie B
- Wibault 360 prototype

9AC

- ANF Les Mureaux 140T
- Bartel BM-2
- Besson MB.35
- Caudron C.240
- Farman F.202
- Hanriot H.36
- Hanriot H.41H
- Hanriot LH.12
- Hanriot HD.320
- Lioré et Olivier LeO H-180
- Morane-Saulnier MS.136
- Morane-Saulnier MS.137
- SPCA 40T

9AD

- Ace 300
- Angus Aquila (A.D.9)
- Arado L I
- Arpin A-1 Safety-Pin (A.D.9R srsIII)
- Aviaméta 9Ac
- B.A. Swallow (A.D.9)
- Bassou Roubis (9 AD
- BFW M.23a
- Boulton & Paul P.41 Phoenix II (A.D.9)
- British-Klemm Swallow (A.D.9R srsIII)
- Brochet MB.50
- Brochet MB.70
- CAP-4 Paulistinha prototype
- Caudron C.109
- Comper C.L.A.7 Swift (A.D.9)
- Couzinet 100 (9 ADb)
- Couzinet 103
- Dupuy D-40 (9 AD)
- Farman F.230
- Gerner G II R (9 AD)
- Hafner R.II Revoplane II (A.D.9)
- Henderson-Glenny Gadfly III
- Hinkler Ibis (A.D.9)
- Indraéro Aéro 20 (9 ADb)
- Indraéro Aéro 30 (9 AD)
- Indraéro Aéro 101 (9 ADb)
- Jodel D.11
- Jodel D.116
- Jodel D.116 (9 ADr)
- Klemm L.25 (A.D.9)
- Mauboussin M.120
- Morane-Saulnier MS.180
- Peyret-Mouboussin M.XII
- Payne Knight Twister prototype
- Parmentier Wee Mite (A.D.9)
- Piel CP.210 Pinocchio (9 AD)
- Rigault RP.01B
- RWD-2
- Salmson D-6 Cricri (9 ADr)
- Siebel Si 202A
- Starck AS-70 Jac
- Starck AS-72
- Taylor E-2 prototype
- Terle Sportplane (9 AD)
- WNF Wn 16

9AG

- Morane-Saulnier MS.406

9AZ

- Farman F.90

9NC

- Besson MB.41
- Morane-Saulnier MS.191
- Morane-Saulnier MS.315
- Morane-Saulnier MS.343
- Salmson Phrygane D-2
- SPCA 41T
- SPCA 218

9ND

- Besson MB.411
- Bloch MB.81
- Guerchais-Roche T.39/II
- Salmson Phrygane D-4

9NE

- Lioré-et-Olivier LeO C.301

9NH

- SNCASE SE-3110

9NM

- SNCASE Alouette I

=== 7AC ===
- Albert A-61
- Caudron C.191&2
- Caudron C.220
- Caudron C.270
- Dewoitine D.480
- Farman F.234
- Farman F.280
- Farman F.352
- Hanriot H.411
- Kellner-Béchereau 23
- Morane-Saulnier MS.132
- Morane-Saulnier MS.148
- Potez 36/5

=== 5Ap ===
- Jodel D.123

=== 5Aq ===
- Caudron C.109.2
- CFA D.7 Cricri Major

=== 5AC ===
- Caudron C.110
- Caudron C.161
- Jodel D.124
- Potez 36/3

== Specifications (9 Ab) ==
Data from Tsygulev

=== General characteristics ===
- Type: Nine-cylinder single-row supercharged air-cooled radial engine
- Bore: 125 mm (4.92 in)
- Stroke: 170 mm (6.69 in)
- Displacement: 18.765 L (1,145 in³)
- Length: 1,000 mm (39.37 in)
- Diameter: 1,180 mm (46.46 in)
- Dry weight: 265 kg (584 lb)

=== Components ===
- Valvetrain: Two overhead valves per cylinder
- Supercharger: Single-speed centrifugal type supercharger
- Fuel system: Zenith 42D carburetor
- Cooling system: Air-cooled

=== Performance ===
- Power output: 191 kW (256 hp) at 1,780 rpm for takeoff
- Specific power: 10.18 kW/L (0.22 hp/in³)
- Compression ratio: 5:1
- Specific fuel consumption: 328 g/(kW•h) (0.54 lb/(hp•h))
- Oil consumption: 19 g/(kW•h) (0.49 oz/(hp•h))
- Power-to-weight ratio: 0.72 kW/kg (0.44 hp/lb)

== See also ==
- Salmson water-cooled aero-engines
- List of aircraft engines
