= Fighter aircraft =

Military aircraft for air-to-air combat

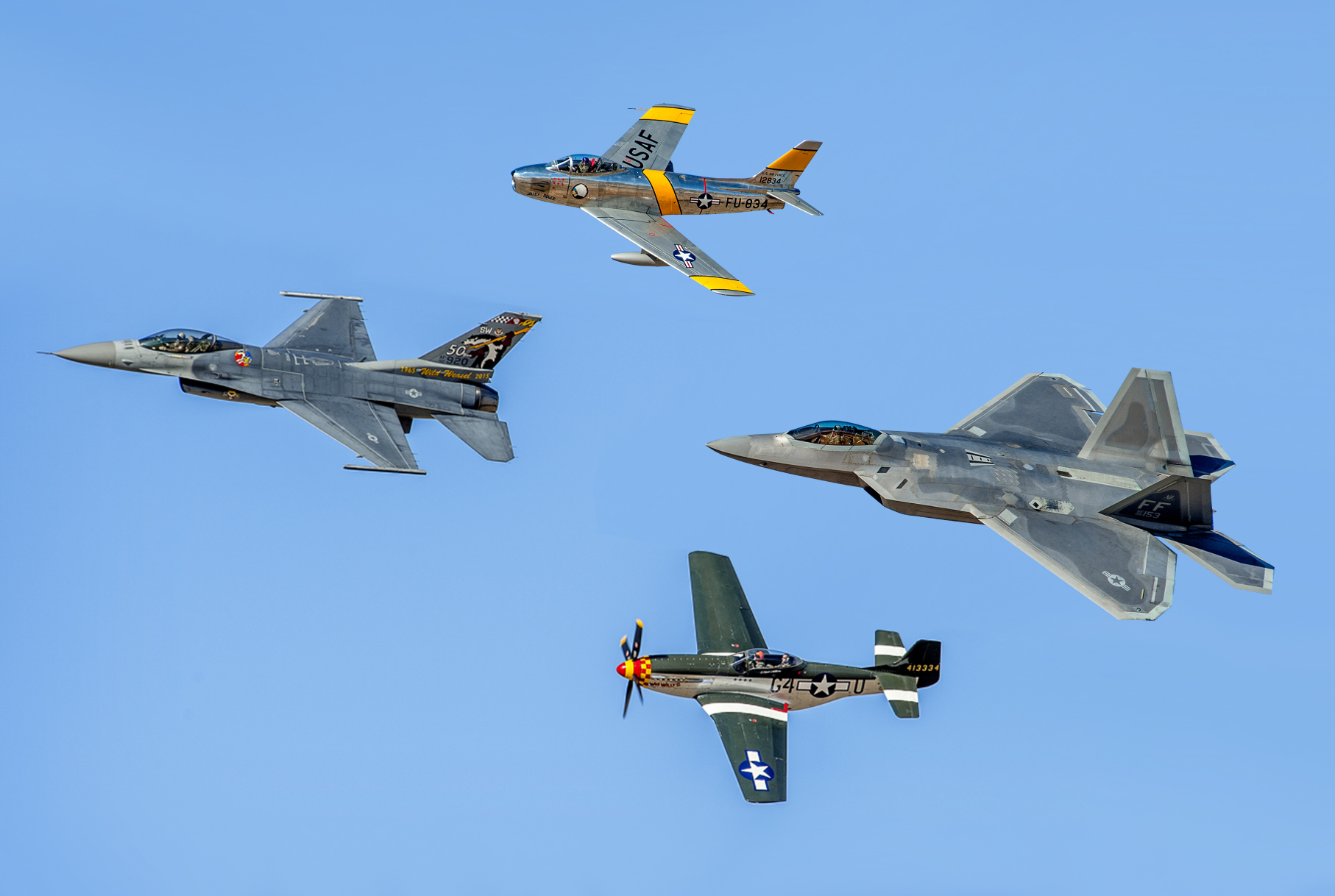
An F-16 Fighting Falcon (left), P-51D Mustang (bottom), F-86 Sabre (top), and F-22 Raptor (right) represent four generations of American fighters.

Fighter aircraft (early on also pursuit aircraft) (Note: Fighter aircraft were early on named pursuit aircraft in English and many other European languages, such as Spanish: avión de caza, French: avion de chasse, Italian: aereo da caccia, German: Jagdflugzeug, Dutch: jachtvliegtuig, Swedish: jaktflygplan. The English term fell out of favor during the late interwar years, though the designation P, as in Curtiss P-40 Warhawk or Republic P-47 Thunderbolt, was not formally replaced in the US Air Force until the late 1940s.) are manned military aircraft designed primarily for air-to-air combat. In military conflict, the role of fighter aircraft is to establish air superiority of the battlespace. Domination of the airspace above a battlefield permits bombers and attack aircraft to engage in tactical and strategic bombing of enemy targets, and helps prevent the enemy from doing the same.

The key performance features of a fighter include not only its firepower but also its high speed and maneuverability relative to the target aircraft. The success or failure of a combatant's efforts to gain air superiority hinges on several factors including the skill of its pilots, the tactical soundness of its doctrine for deploying its fighters, and the numbers and performance of those fighters.

Many modern fighter aircraft also have secondary capabilities such as ground attack and some types, such as fighter-bombers, are designed from the outset for dual roles. Other fighter designs are highly specialized while still filling the main air superiority role, and these include the interceptor and, historically, the heavy fighter and night fighter. Modern jet-powered UCAVs with characteristics similar to manned fighters are known as unmanned fighter aircraft.

== History ==
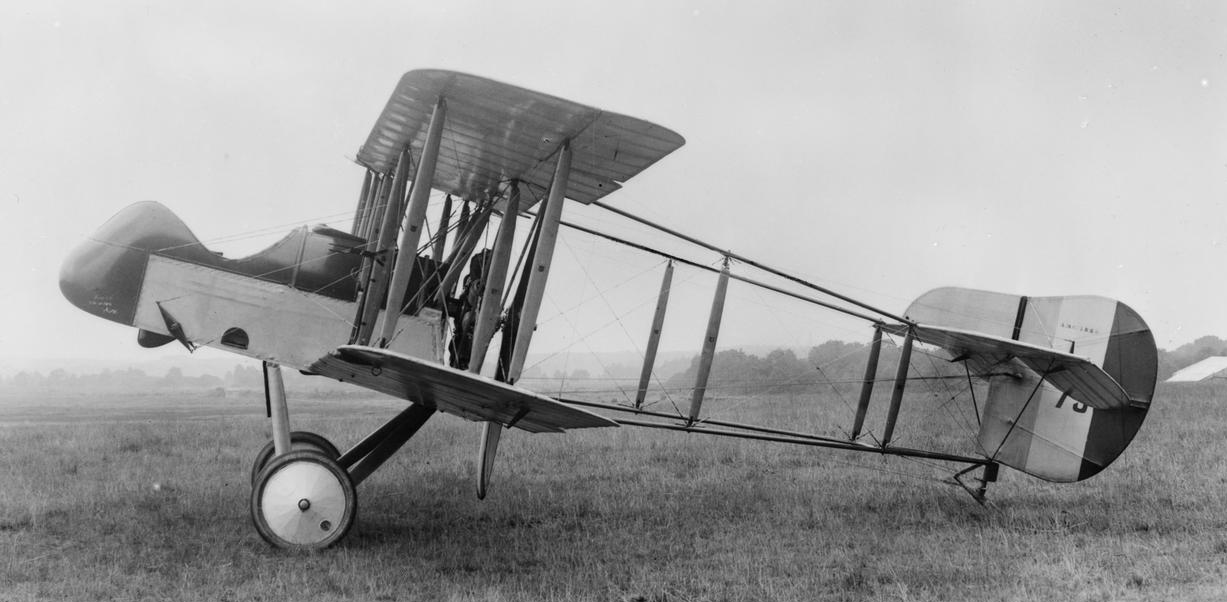
Airco DH.2 "pusher" scout

Since World War I, achieving and maintaining air superiority has been considered essential for victory in conventional warfare.

Fighters continued to be developed throughout World War I, to deny enemy aircraft and dirigibles the ability to gather information by reconnaissance over the battlefield. Early fighters were very small and lightly armed by later standards, and most were biplanes built with a wooden frame covered with fabric, and a maximum airspeed of about 100 mph (160 km/h). A successful German biplane, the Albatross, however, was built with a plywood shell, rather than fabric, which created a stronger, faster airplane. As control of the airspace over armies became increasingly important, all of the major powers developed fighters to support their military operations. Between the wars, wood was largely replaced in part or whole by metal tubing, and finally aluminum stressed skin structures (monocoque) began to predominate.

By World War II, most fighters were all-metal monoplanes armed with batteries of machine guns or cannons and some were capable of speeds approaching 400 mph (640 km/h). Most fighters up to this point had one engine, but a number of twin-engine fighters were built; however they were found to be outmatched against single-engine fighters and were relegated to other tasks, such as night fighters equipped with radar sets.

By the end of the war, turbojet engines were replacing piston engines as the means of propulsion, further increasing aircraft speed. Since the weight of the turbojet engine was far less than a piston engine, having two engines was no longer a handicap and one or two were used, depending on requirements. This in turn required the development of ejection seats so the pilot could escape, and G-suits to counter the much greater forces being applied to the pilot during maneuvers.

Wings were made thinner and swept back to reduce transonic drag, which required new manufacturing methods to obtain sufficient strength. Skins were no longer sheet metal riveted to a structure, but milled from large slabs of alloy. The sound barrier was broken, and after a few false starts due to required changes in controls, speeds quickly reached Mach 2, past which aircraft cannot maneuver sufficiently to avoid attack.

In the 1950s, radar homing missiles were developed, giving fighters the ability to engage aircraft from any aspect (front, sides, or rear), in bad weather, and at longer range.

Air-to-air missiles largely replaced guns and rockets in the early 1960s since both were believed unusable at the speeds being attained, however the Vietnam War showed that guns still had a role to play, and most fighters built since then are fitted with cannon (typically between 20 and 30 mm (0.79 and 1.18 in) in caliber) in addition to missiles. Most modern combat aircraft can carry at least a pair of air-to-air missiles.

In the 1970s, turbofans replaced turbojets, improving fuel economy enough that the last piston engine support aircraft could be replaced with jets, making multi-role combat aircraft possible. Honeycomb structures began to replace milled structures, and the first composite components began to appear on components subjected to little stress.

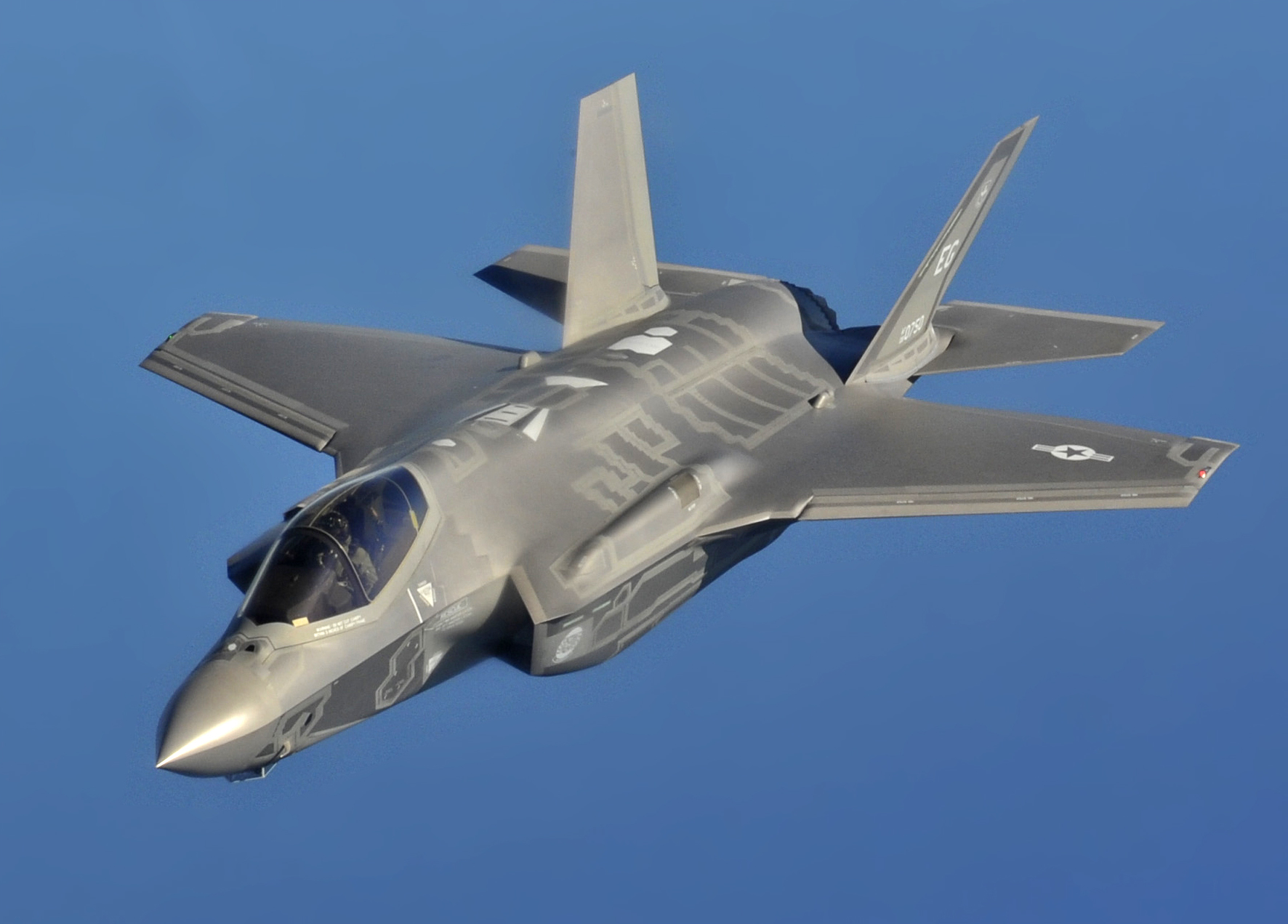
The USAF Lockheed Martin F-35A

With the steady improvements in computers, defensive systems have become increasingly efficient. To counter this, stealth technologies have been pursued by several nations, notably the United States, Russia, and China which all currently field stealth fighters. The first step was to find ways to reduce the aircraft's reflectivity to radar waves by burying the engines, eliminating sharp corners and diverting any reflections away from the radar sets of opposing forces. Various materials were found to absorb the energy from radar waves, and were incorporated into special finishes that have since found widespread application. Composite structures have become widespread, including major structural components, and have helped to counterbalance the steady increases in aircraft weight—most modern fighters are larger and heavier than World War II medium bombers.

Because of the importance of air superiority, since the early days of aerial combat armed forces have constantly competed to develop technologically superior fighters and to deploy these fighters in greater numbers, and fielding a viable fighter fleet consumes a substantial proportion of the defense budgets of modern armed forces.

The global combat aircraft market was worth $45.75 billion in 2017 and is projected by Frost & Sullivan at $47.2 billion in 2026: 35% modernization programs and 65% aircraft purchases, dominated by the Lockheed Martin F-35 with 3,000 deliveries over 20 years.

== Classification ==
A fighter aircraft is primarily designed for air-to-air combat. A given type may be designed for specific combat conditions, and in some cases for additional roles such as air-to-ground fighting. Historically the British Royal Flying Corps and Royal Air Force referred to them as "scouts" until the early 1920s, while the U.S. Army called them "pursuit" aircraft until the late 1940s (using the designation P, as in Curtiss P-40 Warhawk, Republic P-47 Thunderbolt and Bell P-63 Kingcobra). The UK changed to calling them fighters in the 1920s, while the US Army did so in the 1940s. A short-range fighter designed to defend against incoming enemy aircraft is known as an interceptor.

Recognized classes of fighter include:

- Air superiority fighter
- Fighter-bomber
- Heavy fighter
- Interceptor
- Light fighter
- All-weather fighter (including the night fighter)
- Reconnaissance fighter
- Strategic fighter (including the escort fighter and strike fighter)

Of these, the Fighter-bomber, reconnaissance fighter and strike fighter classes are dual-role, possessing qualities of the fighter alongside some other battlefield role. Some fighter designs may be developed in variants performing other roles entirely, such as ground attack or unarmed reconnaissance. This may be for political or national security reasons, for advertising purposes, or other reasons.

The Sopwith Camel and other "fighting scouts" of World War I performed a great deal of ground-attack work. In World War II, the USAAF and RAF often favored fighters over dedicated light bombers or dive bombers, and types such as the Republic P-47 Thunderbolt and Hawker Hurricane that were no longer competitive as aerial combat fighters were relegated to ground attack. Several aircraft, such as the F-111 and F-117, have received fighter designations though they had no fighter capability due to political or other reasons. The F-111B variant was originally intended for a fighter role with the U.S. Navy, but it was canceled. This blurring follows the use of fighters from their earliest days for "attack" or "strike" operations against ground targets by means of strafing or dropping small bombs and incendiaries. Versatile multi role fighter-bombers such as the McDonnell Douglas F/A-18 Hornet are a less expensive option than having a range of specialized aircraft types.

Some of the most expensive fighters such as the US Grumman F-14 Tomcat, McDonnell Douglas F-15 Eagle, Lockheed Martin F-22 Raptor and Russian Sukhoi Su-27 were employed as all-weather interceptors as well as air superiority fighter aircraft, while commonly developing air-to-ground roles late in their careers. An interceptor is generally an aircraft intended to target (or intercept) bombers and so often trades maneuverability for climb rate.

As a part of military nomenclature, a letter is often assigned to various types of aircraft to indicate their use, along with a number to indicate the specific aircraft. The letters used to designate a fighter differ in various countries. In the English-speaking world, "F" is often now used to indicate a fighter (e.g. Lockheed Martin F-35 Lightning II or Supermarine Spitfire F.22), though "P" used to be used in the US for pursuit (e.g. Curtiss P-40 Warhawk), a translation of the French "C" (Dewoitine D.520 C.1) for Chasseur while in Russia "I" was used for Istrebitel, or exterminator (Polikarpov I-16).

=== Air superiority fighter ===
As fighter types have proliferated, the air superiority fighter emerged as a specific role at the pinnacle of speed, maneuverability, and air-to-air weapon systems – able to hold its own against all other fighters and establish its dominance in the skies above the battlefield.

=== Interceptor ===
The interceptor is a fighter designed specifically to intercept and engage approaching enemy aircraft. There are two general classes of interceptor: relatively lightweight aircraft in the point-defense role, built for fast reaction, high performance and with a short range, and heavier aircraft with more comprehensive avionics and designed to fly at night or in all weathers and to operate over longer ranges. Originating during World War I, by 1929 this class of fighters had become known as the interceptor.

=== Night and all-weather fighters ===
The equipment necessary for daytime flight is inadequate when flying at night or in poor visibility. The night fighter was developed during World War I with additional equipment to aid the pilot in flying straight, navigating and finding the target. From modified variants of the Royal Aircraft Factory B.E.2c in 1915, the night fighter has evolved into the highly capable all-weather fighter. The term is no longer in use for current generation aircraft; with the ubiquity of modern radar and night vision, functionally all modern fighters from the 4th generation onward are night fighters.

=== Strategic fighters ===
The strategic fighter is a fast, heavily armed and long-range type, able to act as an escort fighter protecting bombers, to carry out offensive sorties of its own as a penetration fighter and maintain standing patrols at significant distance from its home base.

Bombers are vulnerable due to their low speed, large size and poor maneuverability. The escort fighter was developed during World War II to come between the bombers and enemy attackers as a protective shield. The primary requirement was for long range, with several heavy fighters given the role. However they too proved unwieldy and vulnerable, so as the war progressed techniques such as drop tanks were developed to extend the range of more nimble conventional fighters.

The penetration fighter is typically also fitted for the ground-attack role, and so is able to defend itself while conducting attack sorties.

== Piston engine fighters ==
=== 1914–1918: World War I ===
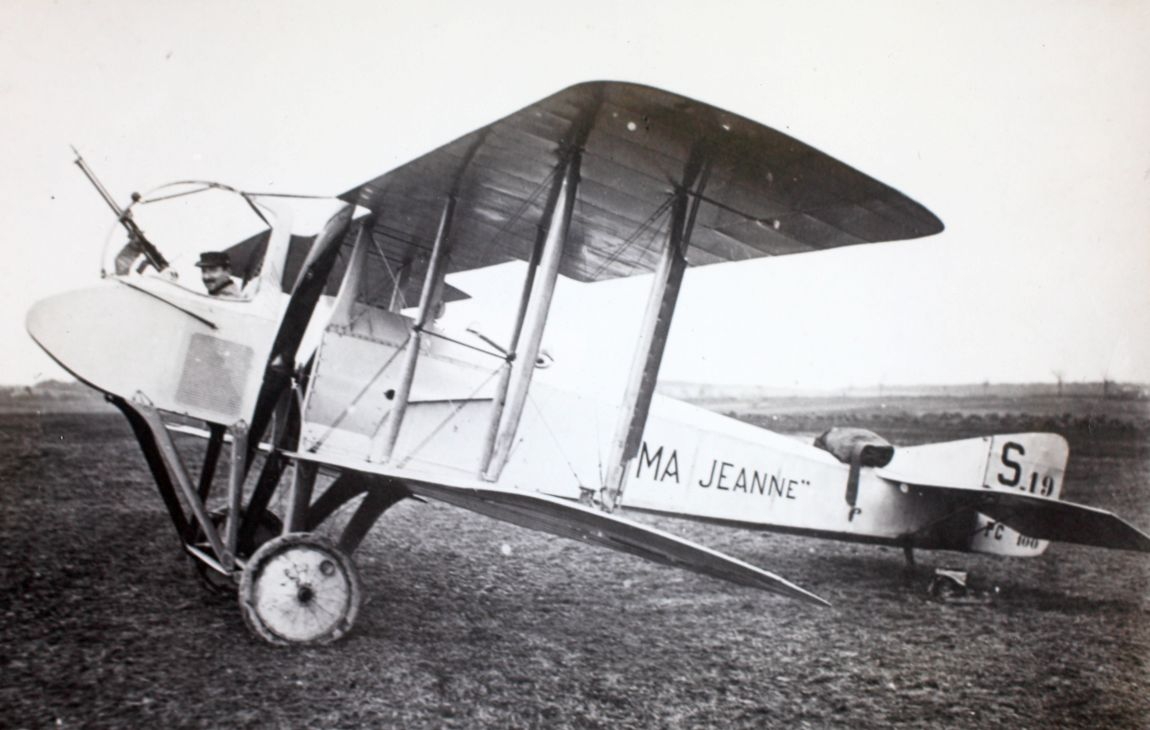
SPAD S.A.2, with gunner in "basket" up front

The word "fighter" was first used to describe a two-seat aircraft carrying a machine gun (mounted on a pedestal) and its operator as well as the pilot. Although the term was coined in the United Kingdom, the first examples were the French Voisin pushers beginning in 1910, and a Voisin III would be the first to shoot down another aircraft, on 5 October 1914.

However at the outbreak of World War I, front-line aircraft were mostly unarmed and used almost exclusively for reconnaissance. On 15 August 1914, Miodrag Tomić encountered an enemy airplane while on a reconnaissance flight over Austria-Hungary which fired at his aircraft with a revolver, so Tomić fired back. It was believed to be the first exchange of fire between aircraft. Within weeks, all Serbian and Austro-Hungarian aircraft were armed.

Another type of military aircraft formed the basis for an effective "fighter" in the modern sense of the word. It was based on small fast aircraft developed before the war for air racing such with the Gordon Bennett Cup and Schneider Trophy. The military scout airplane was not expected to carry serious armament, but rather to rely on speed to "scout" a location, and return quickly to report, making it a flying horse. British scout aircraft, in this sense, included the Sopwith Tabloid and Bristol Scout. The French and the Germans didn't have an equivalent as they used two seaters for reconnaissance, such as the Morane-Saulnier L, but would later modify pre-war racing aircraft into armed single seaters. It was quickly found that these were of little use since the pilot couldn't record what he saw while also flying, while military leaders usually ignored what the pilots reported.

Attempts were made with handheld weapons such as pistols and rifles and even light machine guns, but these were ineffective and cumbersome. The next advance came with the fixed forward-firing machine gun, so that the pilot pointed the entire aircraft at the target and fired the gun, instead of relying on a second gunner. Roland Garros bolted metal deflector plates to the propeller so that it would not shoot itself out of the sky and a number of Morane-Saulnier Ns were modified. The technique proved effective, however the deflected bullets were still highly dangerous.

Soon after the commencement of the war, pilots armed themselves with pistols, carbines, grenades, and an assortment of improvised weapons. Many of these proved ineffective as the pilot had to fly his airplane while attempting to aim a handheld weapon and make a difficult deflection shot. The first step in finding a real solution was to mount the weapon on the aircraft, but the propeller remained a problem since the best direction to shoot is straight ahead. Numerous solutions were tried. A second crew member behind the pilot could aim and fire a swivel-mounted machine gun at enemy airplanes; however, this limited the area of coverage chiefly to the rear hemisphere, and effective coordination of the pilot's maneuvering with the gunner's aiming was difficult. This option was chiefly employed as a defensive measure on two-seater reconnaissance aircraft from 1915 on. Both the SPAD S.A and the Royal Aircraft Factory B.E.9 added a second crewman ahead of the engine in a pod but this was both hazardous to the second crewman and limited performance. The Sopwith L.R.T.Tr. similarly added a pod on the top wing with no better luck.

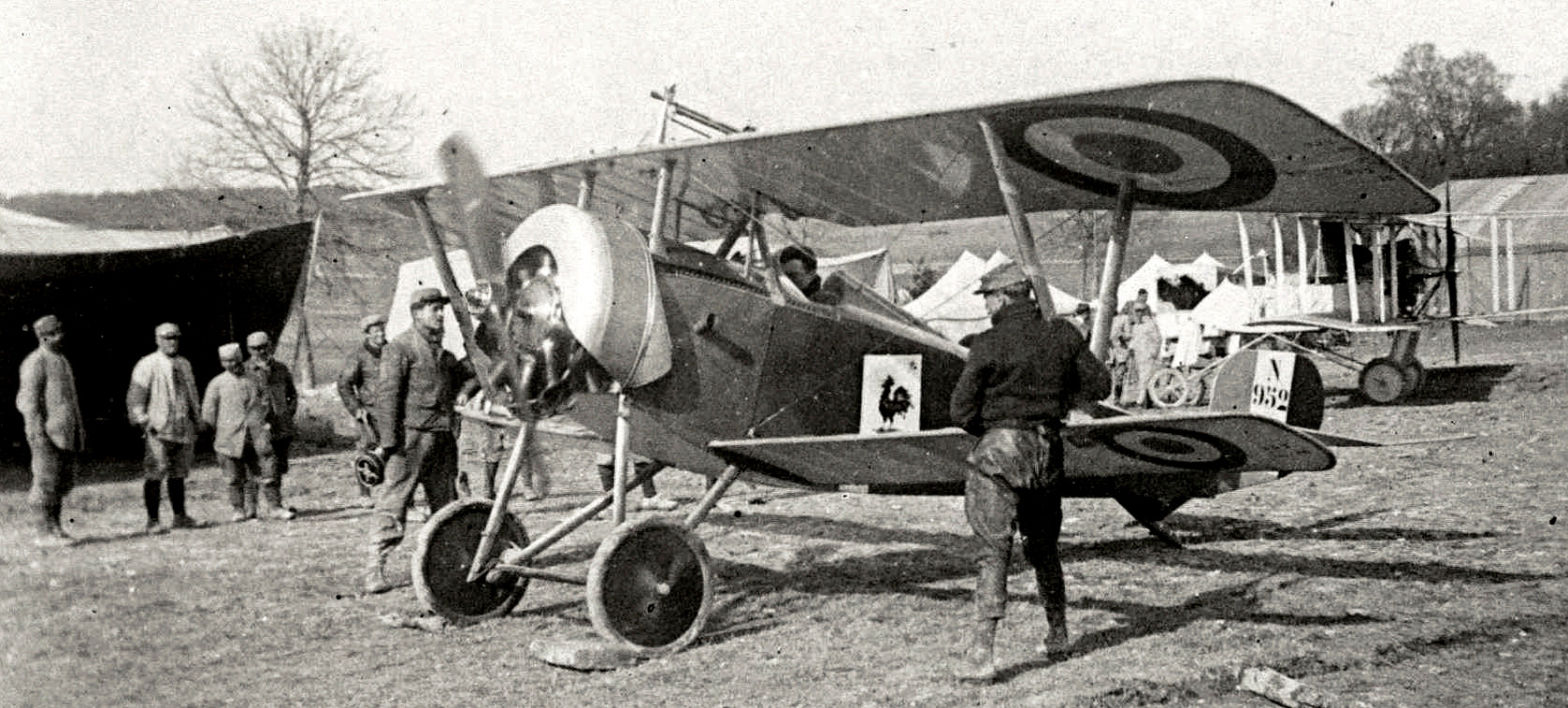
Jules Védrines in his Nieuport 16, armed with a Lewis, after clearing the front line of German observation balloons with the first rocket attack in history

An alternative was to build a "pusher" scout such as the Airco DH.2, with the propeller mounted behind the pilot. The main drawback was that the high drag of a pusher type's tail structure made it slower than a similar "tractor" aircraft. A better solution for a single seat scout was to mount the machine gun (rifles and pistols having been dispensed with) to fire forward but outside the propeller arc. Wing guns were tried but the unreliable weapons available required frequent clearing of jammed rounds and misfires and remained impractical until after the war. Mounting the machine gun over the top wing worked well and was used long after the ideal solution was found. The Nieuport 11 of 1916 used this system with considerable success, however, this placement made aiming and reloading difficult but would continue to be used throughout the war as the weapons used were lighter and had a higher rate of fire than synchronized weapons. The British Foster mounting and several French mountings were specifically designed for this kind of application, fitted with either the Hotchkiss or Lewis Machine gun, which due to their design were unsuitable for synchronizing. The need to arm a tractor scout with a forward-firing gun whose bullets passed through the propeller arc was evident even before the outbreak of war and inventors in both France and Germany devised mechanisms that could time the firing of the individual rounds to avoid hitting the propeller blades. Franz Schneider, a Swiss engineer, had patented such a device in Germany in 1913, but his original work was not followed up. French aircraft designer Raymond Saulnier patented a practical device in April 1914, but trials were unsuccessful because of the propensity of the machine gun employed to hang fire due to unreliable ammunition. In December 1914, French aviator Roland Garros asked Saulnier to install his synchronization gear on Garros' Morane-Saulnier Type L parasol monoplane. Unfortunately the gas-operated Hotchkiss machine gun he was provided had an erratic rate of fire and it was impossible to synchronize it with the propeller. As an interim measure, the propeller blades were fitted with metal wedges to protect them from ricochets. Garros' modified monoplane first flew in March 1915 and he began combat operations soon after. Garros scored three victories in three weeks before he himself was downed on 18 April and his airplane, along with its synchronization gear and propeller was captured by the Germans. Meanwhile, the synchronization gear (called the Stangensteuerung in German, for "pushrod control system") devised by the engineers of Anthony Fokker's firm was the first system to enter service. It would usher in what the British called the "Fokker scourge" and a period of air superiority for the German forces, making the Fokker Eindecker monoplane a feared name over the Western Front, despite its being an adaptation of an obsolete pre-war French Morane-Saulnier racing airplane, with poor flight characteristics and a by now mediocre performance. The first Eindecker victory came on 1 July 1915, when Leutnant Kurt Wintgens, of Feldflieger Abteilung 6 on the Western Front, downed a Morane-Saulnier Type L. His was one of five Fokker M.5K/MG prototypes for the Eindecker, and was armed with a synchronized aviation version of the Parabellum MG14 machine gun. The success of the Eindecker kicked off a competitive cycle of improvement among the combatants, both sides striving to build ever more capable single-seat fighters. The Albatros D.I and Sopwith Pup of 1916 set the classic pattern followed by fighters for about twenty years. Most were biplanes and only rarely monoplanes or triplanes. The strong box structure of the biplane provided a rigid wing that allowed the accurate control essential for dogfighting. They had a single operator, who flew the aircraft and also controlled its armament. They were armed with one or two Maxim or Vickers machine guns, which were easier to synchronize than other types, firing through the propeller arc. Gun breeches were in front of the pilot, with obvious implications in case of accidents, but jams could be cleared in flight, while aiming was simplified.

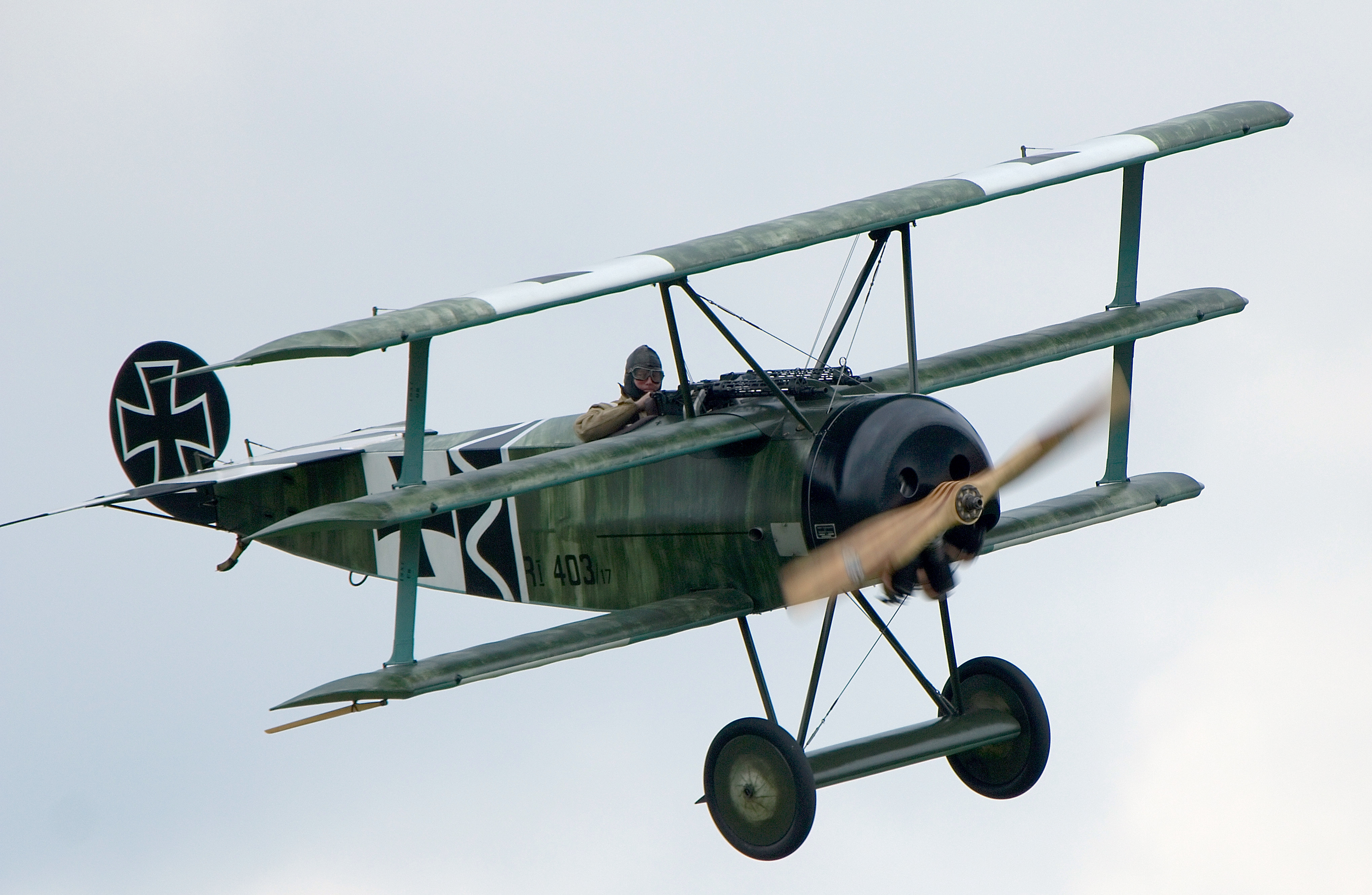
A replica German Fokker Dr.I

The use of metal aircraft structures was pioneered before World War I by Breguet but would find its biggest proponent in Anthony Fokker, who used chrome-molybdenum steel tubing for the fuselage structure of all his fighter designs, while the innovative German engineer Hugo Junkers developed two all-metal, single-seat fighter monoplane designs with cantilever wings: the strictly experimental Junkers J 2 private-venture aircraft, made with steel, and some forty examples of the Junkers D.I, made with corrugated duralumin, all based on his experience in creating the pioneering Junkers J 1 all-metal airframe technology demonstration aircraft of late 1915. While Fokker would pursue steel tube fuselages with wooden wings until the late 1930s, and Junkers would focus on corrugated sheet metal, Dornier was the first to build a fighter (the Dornier-Zeppelin D.I) made with pre-stressed sheet aluminum and having cantilevered wings, a form that would replace all others in the 1930s. As collective combat experience grew, the more successful pilots such as Oswald Boelcke, Max Immelmann, and Edward Mannock developed innovative tactical formations and maneuvers to enhance their air units' combat effectiveness.

Allied and – before 1918 – German pilots of World War I were not equipped with parachutes, so in-flight fires or structural failures were often fatal. Parachutes were well-developed by 1918 having previously been used by balloonists, and were adopted by the German flying services during the course of that year. The well-known Manfred von Richthofen, the "Red Baron", was wearing one when he was killed, but the allied command continued to oppose their use on various grounds.

In April 1917, during a brief period of German aerial supremacy a British pilot's average life expectancy was calculated to average 93 flying hours, or about three weeks of active service. More than 50,000 airmen from both sides died during the war.

=== 1919–1938: Inter-war period ===
Fighter development stagnated between the wars, especially in the United States and the United Kingdom, where budgets were small. In France, Italy and Russia, where large budgets continued to allow major development, both monoplanes and all metal structures were common. By the end of the 1920s, however, those countries overspent themselves and were overtaken in the 1930s by those powers that hadn't been spending heavily, namely the British, the Americans, the Spanish (in the Spanish civil war) and the Germans.

Given limited budgets, air forces were conservative in aircraft design, and biplanes remained popular with pilots for their agility, and remained in service long after they ceased to be competitive. Designs such as the Gloster Gladiator, Fiat CR.42 Falco, and Polikarpov I-15 were common even in the late 1930s, and many were still in service as late as 1942. Up until the mid-1930s, the majority of fighters in the US, the UK, Italy and Russia remained fabric-covered biplanes.

Fighter armament eventually began to be mounted inside the wings, outside the arc of the propeller, though most designs retained two synchronized machine guns directly ahead of the pilot, where they were more accurate (that being the strongest part of the structure, reducing the vibration to which the guns were subjected). Shooting with this traditional arrangement was also easier because the guns shot directly ahead in the direction of the aircraft's flight, up to the limit of the guns range; unlike wing-mounted guns which to be effective required to be harmonized, that is, preset to shoot at an angle by ground crews so that their bullets would converge on a target area a set distance ahead of the fighter. Rifle-caliber .30 and .303 in (7.62 and 7.70 mm) caliber guns remained the norm, with larger weapons either being too heavy and cumbersome or deemed unnecessary against such lightly built aircraft. It was not considered unreasonable to use World War I-style armament to counter enemy fighters as there was insufficient air-to-air combat during most of the period to disprove this notion.

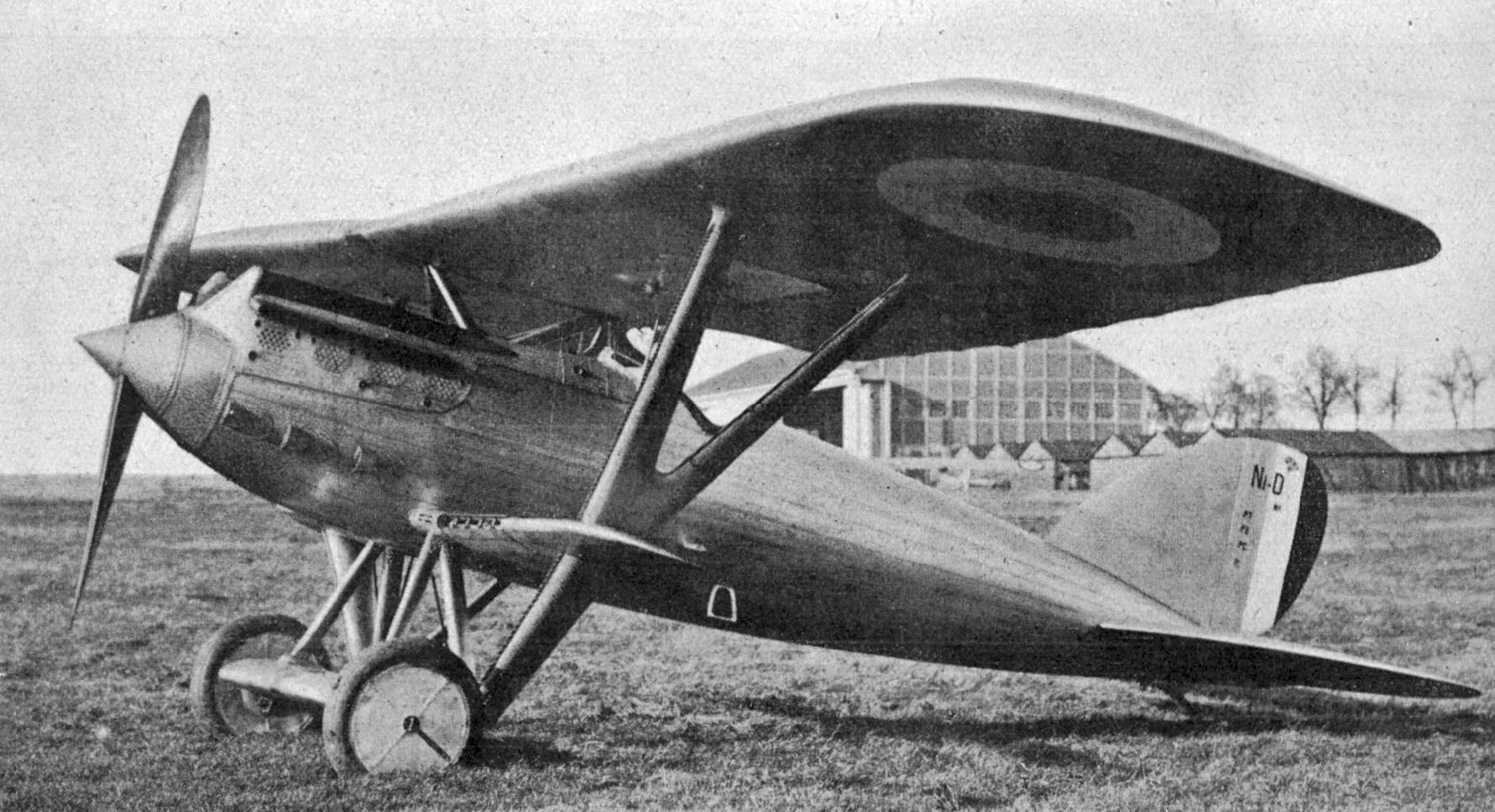
Nieuport-Delage NiD.52, which in various forms would be used through the 20s and into the 1930s by various European air arms, including that of the French and Spanish.

The rotary engine, popular during World War I, quickly disappeared, its development having reached the point where rotational forces prevented more fuel and air from being delivered to the cylinders, which limited horsepower. They were replaced chiefly by the stationary radial engine though major advances led to inline engines gaining ground with several exceptional engines—including the 1,145 cu in (18,760 cm^{3}) V-12 Curtiss D-12. Aircraft engines increased in power several-fold over the period, going from a typical 180 hp (130 kW) in the 900 kg (2,000 lb) Fokker D.VII of 1918 to 900 hp (670 kW) in the 2,500 kg (5,500 lb) Curtiss P-36 of 1936. The debate between the sleek in-line engines versus the more reliable radial models continued, with naval air forces preferring the radial engines, and land-based forces often choosing inlines. Radial designs did not require a separate (and vulnerable) radiator, but had increased drag. Inline engines often had a better power-to-weight ratio.

Some air forces experimented with "heavy fighters" (called "destroyers" by the Germans). These were larger, usually twin-engine aircraft, sometimes adaptations of light or medium bomber types. Such designs typically had greater internal fuel capacity (thus longer range) and heavier armament than their single-engine counterparts. In combat, they proved vulnerable to more agile single-engine fighters.

The primary driver of fighter innovation, right up to the period of rapid rearmament in the late 1930s, were not military budgets, but civilian aircraft racing. Aircraft designed for these races introduced innovations like streamlining and more powerful engines that would find their way into the fighters of World War II. The most significant of these was the Schneider Trophy races, where competition grew so fierce, only national governments could afford to enter.

At the very end of the inter-war period in Europe came the Spanish Civil War. This was just the opportunity the German Luftwaffe, Italian Regia Aeronautica, and the Soviet Union's Voenno-Vozdushnye Sily needed to test their latest aircraft. Each party sent numerous aircraft types to support their sides in the conflict. In the dogfights over Spain, the latest Messerschmitt Bf 109 fighters did well, as did the Soviet Polikarpov I-16. The later German design was earlier in its design cycle, and had more room for development and the lessons learned led to greatly improved models in World War II. The Russians failed to keep up and despite newer models coming into service, I-16s remaining the most common Soviet front-line fighter into 1942 despite being outclassed by the improved Bf 109s in World War II. For their part, the Italians developed several monoplanes such as the Fiat G.50 Freccia, but being short on funds, were forced to continue operating obsolete Fiat CR.42 Falco biplanes.

From the early 1930s the Japanese were at war against both the Chinese Nationalists and the Russians in China, and used the experience to improve both training and aircraft, replacing biplanes with modern cantilever monoplanes and creating a cadre of exceptional pilots. In the United Kingdom, at the behest of Neville Chamberlain (more famous for his 'peace in our time' speech), the entire British aviation industry was retooled, allowing it to change quickly from fabric covered metal framed biplanes to cantilever stressed skin monoplanes in time for the war with Germany, a process that France attempted to emulate, but too late to counter the German invasion. The period of improving the same biplane design over and over was now coming to an end, and the Hawker Hurricane and Supermarine Spitfire started to supplant the Gloster Gladiator and Hawker Fury biplanes but many biplanes remained in front-line service well past the start of World War II. While not a combatant in Spain, they too absorbed many of the lessons in time to use them.

The Spanish Civil War also provided an opportunity for updating fighter tactics. One of the innovations was the development of the "finger-four" formation by the German pilot Werner Mölders. Each fighter squadron (German: Staffel) was divided into several flights (Schwärme) of four aircraft. Each Schwarm was divided into two Rotten, which was a pair of aircraft. Each Rotte was composed of a leader and a wingman. This flexible formation allowed the pilots to maintain greater situational awareness, and the two Rotten could split up at any time and attack on their own. The finger-four would be widely adopted as the fundamental tactical formation during World War Two, including by the British and later the Americans.

=== 1939–1945: World War II ===
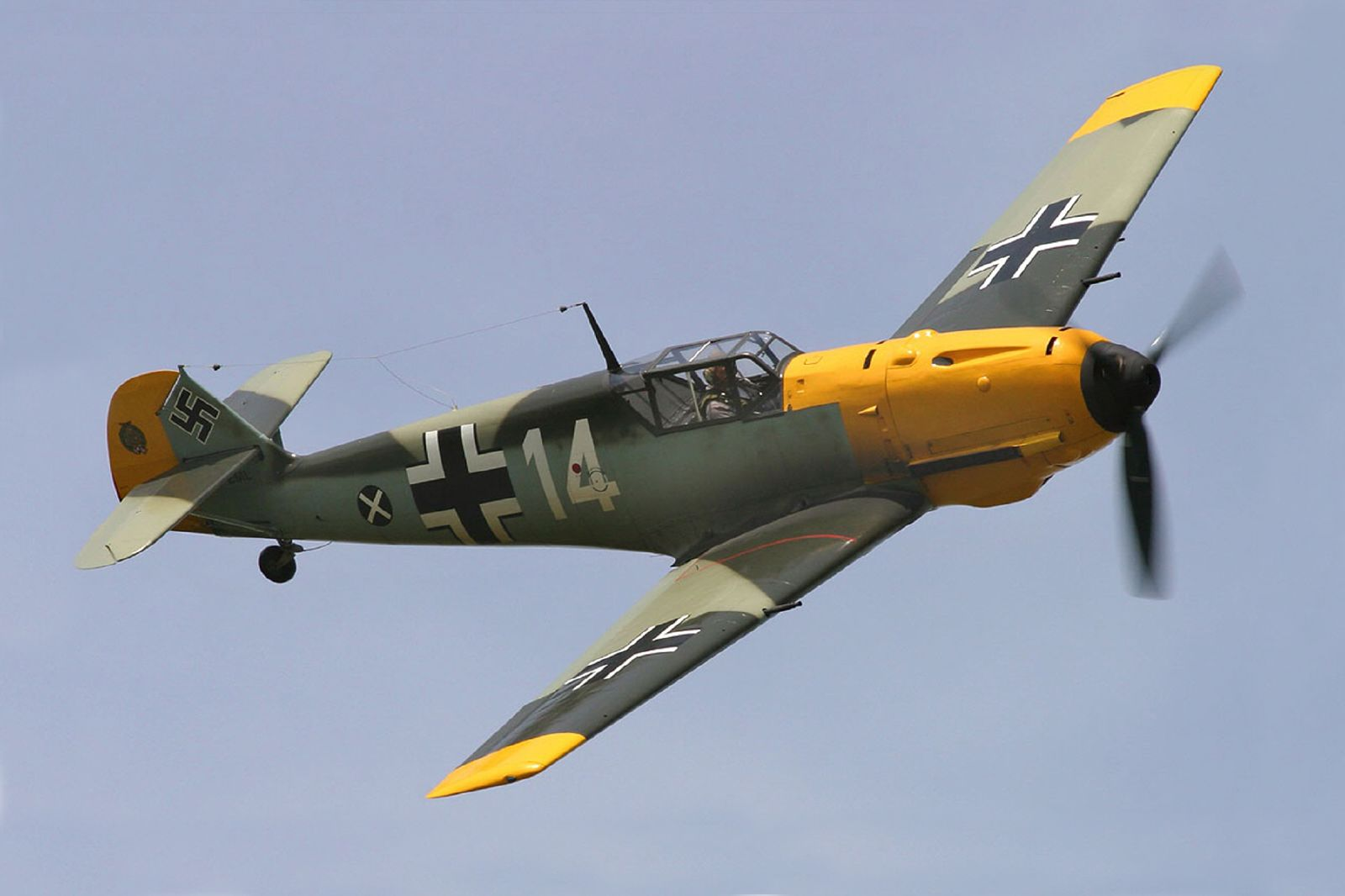
A Messerschmitt Bf 109E warbird demonstrator

World War II featured fighter combat on a larger scale than any other conflict to date. German Field Marshal Erwin Rommel noted the effect of airpower: "Anyone who has to fight, even with the most modern weapons, against an enemy in complete command of the air, fights like a savage..." Throughout the war, fighters performed their conventional role in establishing air superiority through combat with other fighters and through bomber interception, and also often performed roles such as tactical air support and reconnaissance.

Fighter design varied widely among combatants. The Japanese and Italians favored lightly armed and armored but highly maneuverable designs such as the Japanese Nakajima Ki-27, Nakajima Ki-43 and Mitsubishi A6M Zero and the Italian Fiat G.50 Freccia and Macchi MC.200. In contrast, designers in the United Kingdom, Germany, the Soviet Union, and the United States believed that the increased speed of fighter aircraft would create g-forces unbearable to pilots who attempted maneuvering dogfights typical of the First World War, and their fighters were instead optimized for speed and firepower. In practice, while light, highly maneuverable aircraft did possess some advantages in fighter-versus-fighter combat, those could usually be overcome by sound tactical doctrine, and the design approach of the Italians and Japanese made their fighters ill-suited as interceptors or attack aircraft.

==== European theater ====
During the invasion of Poland and the Battle of France, Luftwaffe fighters—primarily the Messerschmitt Bf 109—held air superiority, and the Luftwaffe played a major role in German victories in these campaigns. During the Battle of Britain, however, British Hurricanes and Spitfires proved roughly equal to Luftwaffe fighters. Additionally Britain's radar-based Dowding system directing fighters onto German attacks and the advantages of fighting above Britain's home territory allowed the RAF to deny Germany air superiority, saving the UK from possible German invasion and dealing the Axis a major defeat early in the Second World War. On the Eastern Front, Soviet fighter forces were overwhelmed during the opening phases of Operation Barbarossa. This was a result of the tactical surprise at the outset of the campaign, the leadership vacuum within the Soviet military left by the Great Purge, and the general inferiority of Soviet designs at the time, such as the obsolescent Polikarpov I-15 biplane and the I-16. More modern Soviet designs, including the Mikoyan-Gurevich MiG-3, LaGG-3 and Yakolev Yak-1, had not yet arrived in numbers and in any case were still inferior to the Messerschmitt Bf 109. As a result, during the early months of these campaigns, Axis air forces destroyed large numbers of Red Air Force aircraft on the ground and in one-sided dogfights. In the later stages on the Eastern Front, Soviet training and leadership improved, as did their equipment. By 1942 Soviet designs such as the Yakovlev Yak-9 and Lavochkin La-5 had performance comparable to the German Bf 109 and Focke-Wulf Fw 190. Also, significant numbers of British, and later U.S., fighter aircraft were supplied to aid the Soviet war effort as part of Lend-Lease, with the Bell P-39 Airacobra proving particularly effective in the lower-altitude combat typical of the Eastern Front. The Soviets were also helped indirectly by the American and British bombing campaigns, which forced the Luftwaffe to shift many of its fighters away from the Eastern Front in defense against these raids. The Soviets increasingly were able to challenge the Luftwaffe, and while the Luftwaffe maintained a qualitative edge over the Red Air Force for much of the war, the increasing numbers and efficacy of the Soviet Air Force were critical to the Red Army's efforts at turning back and eventually annihilating the Wehrmacht.

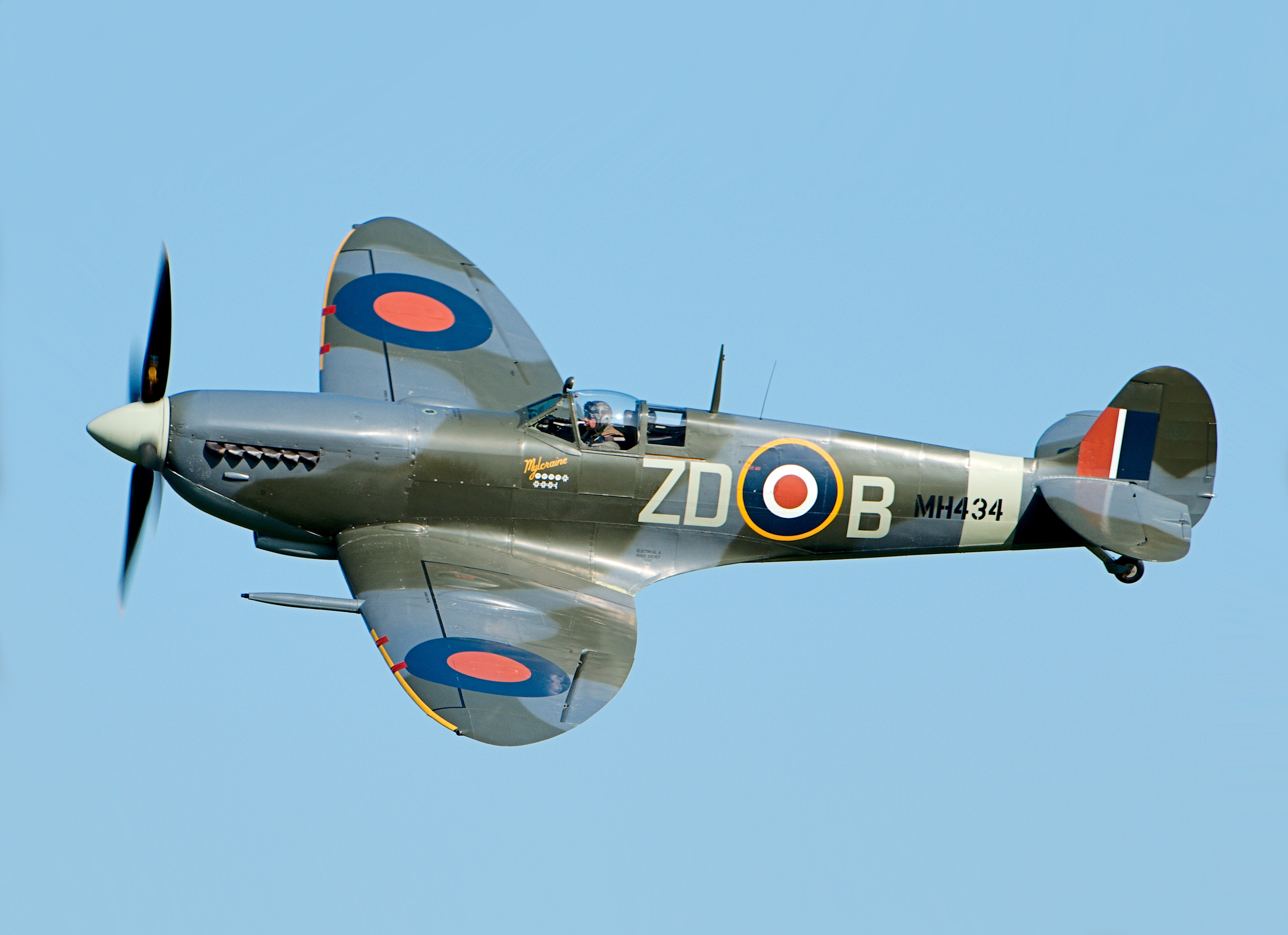
A Supermarine Spitfire, typical World War II fighter optimized for high level speeds and good climb rates.

Meanwhile, air combat on the Western Front had a much different character. Much of this combat focused on the strategic bombing campaigns of the RAF and the USAAF against German industry intended to wear down the Luftwaffe. Axis fighter aircraft focused on defending against Allied bombers while Allied fighters' main role was as bomber escorts. The RAF raided German cities at night, and both sides developed radar-equipped night fighters for these battles. The Americans, in contrast, flew daylight bombing raids into Germany delivering the Combined Bomber Offensive. Unescorted Consolidated B-24 Liberators and Boeing B-17 Flying Fortress bombers, however, proved unable to fend off German interceptors (primarily Bf 109s and Fw 190s). With the later arrival of long range fighters, particularly the North American P-51 Mustang, American fighters were able to escort far into Germany on daylight raids and by ranging ahead attrited the Luftwaffe to establish control of the skies over Western Europe.

By the time of Operation Overlord in June 1944, the Allies had gained near complete air superiority over the Western Front. This cleared the way both for intensified strategic bombing of German cities and industries, and for the tactical bombing of battlefield targets. With the Luftwaffe largely cleared from the skies, Allied fighters increasingly served as ground attack aircraft.

Allied fighters, by gaining air superiority over the European battlefield, played a crucial role in the eventual defeat of the Axis, which Reichmarshal Hermann Göring, commander of the German Luftwaffe summed up when he said: "When I saw Mustangs over Berlin, I knew the jig was up."

==== Pacific theater ====
Major air combat during the war in the Pacific began with the entry of the Western Allies following Japan's attack against Pearl Harbor. The Imperial Japanese Navy Air Service primarily operated the Mitsubishi A6M Zero, and the Imperial Japanese Army Air Service flew the Nakajima Ki-27 and the Nakajima Ki-43, initially enjoying great success, as these fighters generally had better range, maneuverability, speed and climb rates than their Allied counterparts. Additionally, Japanese pilots were well trained and many were combat veterans from Japan's campaigns in China. They quickly gained air superiority over the Allies, who at this stage of the war were often disorganized, under-trained and poorly equipped, and Japanese air power contributed significantly to their successes in the Philippines, Malaysia and Singapore, the Dutch East Indies and Burma.

By mid-1942, the Allies began to regroup and while some Allied aircraft such as the Brewster Buffalo and the P-39 Airacobra were hopelessly outclassed by fighters like Japan's Mitsubishi A6M Zero, others such as the Army's Curtiss P-40 Warhawk and the Navy's Grumman F4F Wildcat possessed attributes such as superior firepower, ruggedness and dive speed, and the Allies soon developed tactics (such as the Thach Weave) to take advantage of these strengths. These changes soon paid dividends, as the Allied ability to deny Japan air superiority was critical to their victories at Coral Sea, Midway, Guadalcanal and New Guinea. In China, the Flying Tigers also used the same tactics with some success, although they were unable to stem the tide of Japanese advances there. By 1943, the Allies began to gain the upper hand in the Pacific Campaign's air campaigns. Several factors contributed to this shift. First, the Lockheed P-38 Lightning and second-generation Allied fighters such as the Grumman F6 Hellcat and later the Vought F4 Corsair, the Republic P-47 Thunderbolt and the North American P-51 Mustang, began arriving in numbers. These fighters outperformed Japanese fighters in all respects except maneuverability. Other problems with Japan's fighter aircraft also became apparent as the war progressed, such as their lack of armor and light armament, which had been typical of all pre-war fighters worldwide, but the problem was particularly difficult to rectify on the Japanese designs. This made them inadequate as either bomber-interceptors or ground-attack aircraft, roles Allied fighters were still able to fill. Most importantly, Japan's training program failed to provide enough well-trained pilots to replace losses. In contrast, the Allies improved both the quantity and quality of pilots graduating from their training programs. By mid-1944, Allied fighters had gained air superiority throughout the theater, which would not be contested again during the war. The extent of Allied quantitative and qualitative superiority by this point in the war was demonstrated during the Battle of the Philippine Sea, a lopsided Allied victory in which Japanese fliers were shot down in such numbers and with such ease that American fighter pilots likened it to a great 'turkey shoot'. Late in the war, Japan began to produce new fighters such as the Nakajima Ki-84 and the Kawanishi N1K to replace the Zero, but only in small numbers, and by then Japan lacked the trained pilots or sufficient fuel to mount an effective challenge to Allied attacks. During the closing stages of the war, Japan's fighter arm could not seriously challenge raids over Japan by American Boeing B-29 Superfortresses, and was largely reduced to Kamikaze attacks.

==== Technological innovations ====
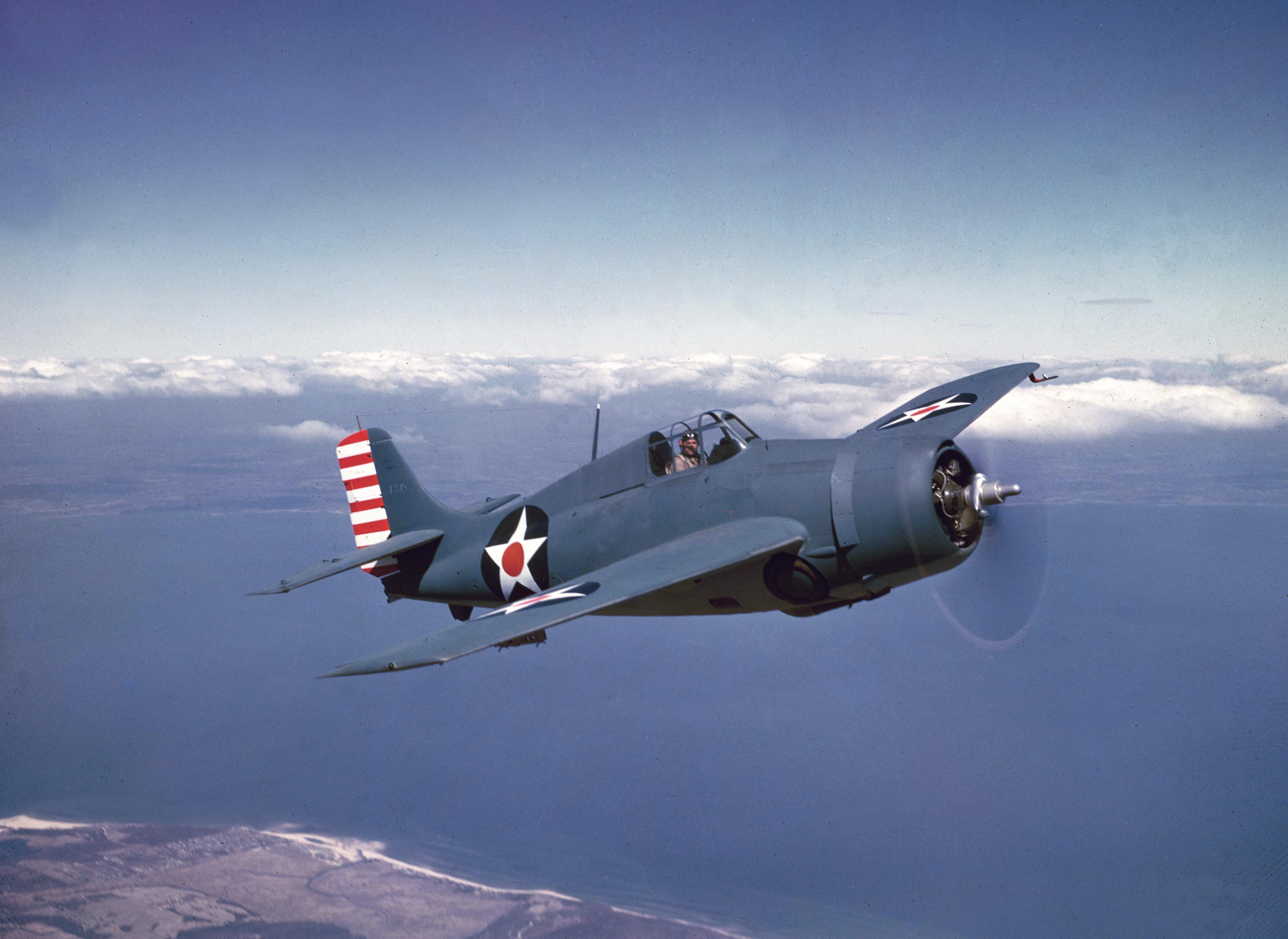
Grumman F4F-3 Wildcat, early 1942

Fighter technology advanced rapidly during the Second World War. Piston-engines, which powered the vast majority of World War II fighters, grew more powerful: at the beginning of the war fighters typically had engines producing between 1,000 hp (750 kW) and 1,400 hp (1,000 kW), while by the end of the war many could produce over 2,000 hp (1,500 kW). For example, the Spitfire, one of the few fighters in continuous production throughout the war, was in 1939 powered by a 1,030 hp (770 kW) Merlin II, while variants produced in 1945 were equipped with the 2,035 hp (1,517 kW) Rolls-Royce Griffon 61. Nevertheless, these fighters could only achieve modest increases in top speed due to problems of compressibility created as aircraft and their propellers approached the sound barrier, and it was apparent that propeller-driven aircraft were approaching the limits of their performance. German jet and rocket-powered fighters entered combat in 1944, too late to impact the war's outcome. The same year the Allies' only operational jet fighter, the Gloster Meteor, also entered service. World War II fighters also increasingly featured monocoque construction, which improved their aerodynamic efficiency while adding structural strength. Laminar flow wings, which improved high speed performance, also came into use on fighters such as the P-51 Mustang, while the Messerschmitt Me 262 and the Messerschmitt Me 163 featured swept wings that dramatically reduced drag at high subsonic speeds. Armament also advanced during the war. The rifle-caliber machine guns that were common on prewar fighters could not easily down the more rugged warplanes of the era. Air forces began to replace or supplement them with cannons, which fired explosive shells that could blast a hole in an enemy aircraft – rather than relying on kinetic energy from a solid bullet striking a critical component of the aircraft, such as a fuel line or control cable, or the pilot. Cannons could bring down even heavy bombers with just a few hits, but their slower rate of fire made it difficult to hit fast-moving fighters in a dogfight. Eventually, most fighters mounted cannons, sometimes in combination with machine guns. The British epitomized this shift. Their standard early war fighters mounted eight .303 in (7.7 mm) caliber machine guns, but by mid-war they often featured a combination of machine guns and 20 mm (0.79 in) cannons, and late in the war often only cannons. The Americans, in contrast, had problems producing a cannon design, so instead placed multiple .50 in (12.7 mm) heavy machine guns on their fighters. Fighters were also increasingly fitted with bomb racks and air-to-surface ordnance such as bombs or rockets beneath their wings, and pressed into close air support roles as fighter-bombers. Although they carried less ordnance than light and medium bombers, and generally had a shorter range, they were cheaper to produce and maintain and their maneuverability made it easier for them to hit moving targets such as motorized vehicles. Moreover, if they encountered enemy fighters, their ordnance (which reduced lift and increased drag and therefore decreased performance) could be jettisoned and they could engage enemy fighters, which eliminated the need for fighter escorts that bombers required.

Heavily armed fighters such as Germany's Focke-Wulf Fw 190, Britain's Hawker Typhoon and Hawker Tempest, and America's Curtiss P-40, F4U Corsair, P-47 Thunderbolt and P-38 Lightning all excelled as fighter-bombers, and since the Second World War ground attack has become an important secondary capability of many fighters. World War II also saw the first use of airborne radar on fighters. The primary purpose of these radars was to help night fighters locate enemy bombers and fighters. Because of the bulkiness of these radar sets, they could not be carried on conventional single-engine fighters and instead were typically retrofitted to larger heavy fighters or light bombers such as Germany's Messerschmitt Bf 110 and Junkers Ju 88, Britain's de Havilland Mosquito and Bristol Beaufighter, and America's Douglas A-20, which then served as night fighters. The Northrop P-61 Black Widow, a purpose-built night fighter, was the only fighter of the war that incorporated radar into its original design. Britain and America cooperated closely in the development of airborne radar, and Germany's radar technology generally lagged slightly behind Anglo-American efforts, while other combatants developed few radar-equipped fighters.

A concept originated from German engineer Bernhard J. Schrage in 1943 as a response to the increasing threat posed by Allied heavy bombers, particularly at night. The Schrage Musik system involved mounting upward-facing cannon turrets, typically twin 20mm or 30mm guns, in the belly of German night fighters such as the Messerschmitt Bf 110 and later versions of the Junkers Ju 88. These guns were angled upward to target the vulnerable underside of enemy bombers.

=== 1946–present: Post–World War II period ===
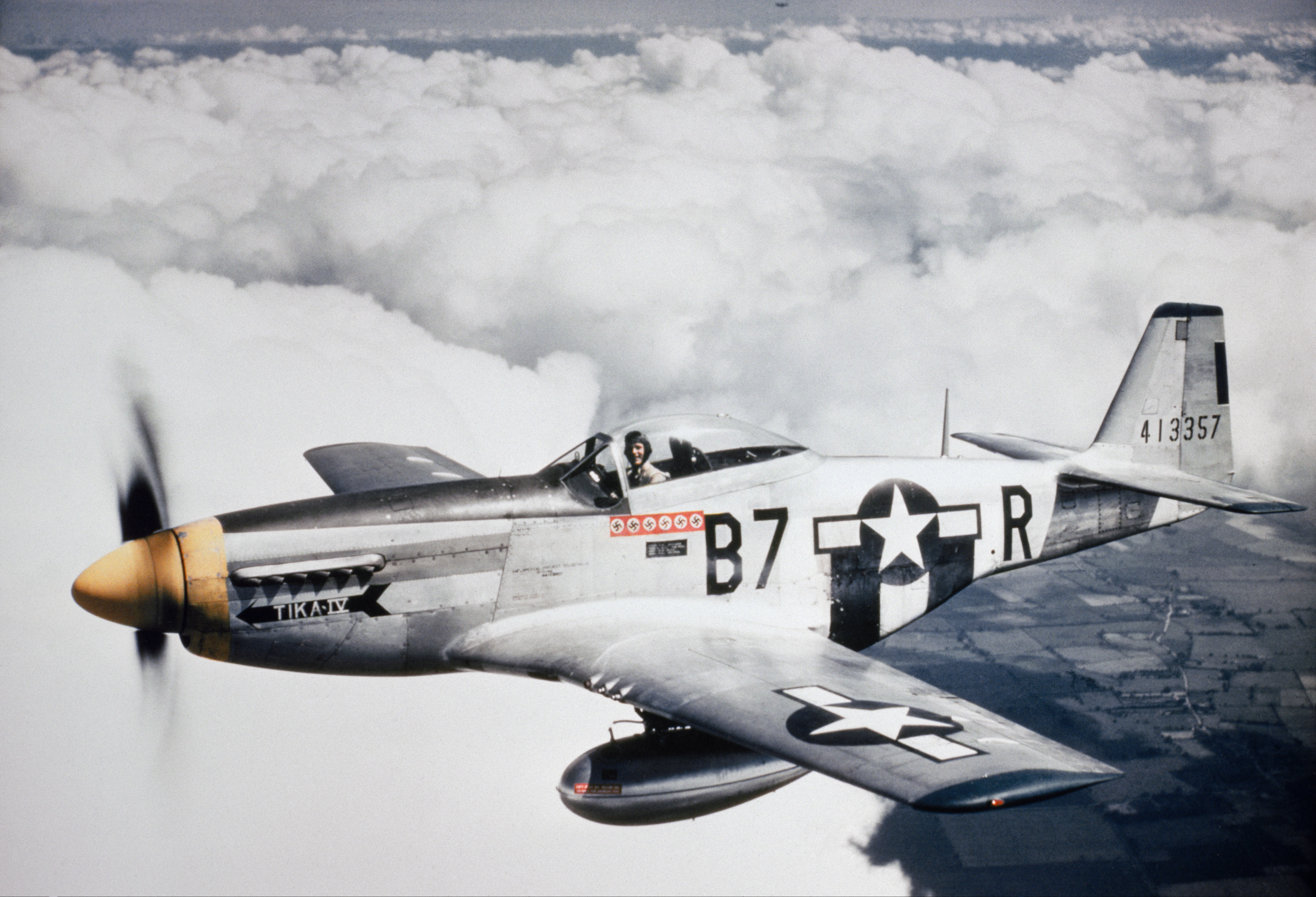
North American P-51D Mustang during WWII

Several prototype fighter programs begun early in 1945 continued on after the war and led to advanced piston-engine fighters that entered production and operational service in 1946. A typical example is the Lavochkin La-9 'Fritz', which was an evolution of the successful wartime Lavochkin La-7 'Fin'. Working through a series of prototypes, the La-120, La-126 and La-130, the Lavochkin design bureau sought to replace the La-7's wooden airframe with a metal one, as well as fit a laminar flow wing to improve maneuver performance, and increased armament. The La-9 entered service in August 1946 and was produced until 1948; it also served as the basis for the development of a long-range escort fighter, the La-11 'Fang', of which nearly 1200 were produced 1947–51. Over the course of the Korean War, however, it became obvious that the day of the piston-engine fighter was coming to a close and that the future would lie with the jet fighter.

This period also witnessed experimentation with jet-assisted piston engine aircraft. La-9 derivatives included examples fitted with two underwing auxiliary pulsejet engines (the La-9RD) and a similarly mounted pair of auxiliary ramjet engines (the La-138); however, neither of these entered service. One that did enter service – with the U.S. Navy in March 1945 – was the Ryan FR-1 Fireball; production was halted with the war's end on VJ-Day, with only 66 having been delivered, and the type was withdrawn from service in 1947. The USAAF had ordered its first 13 mixed turboprop-turbojet-powered pre-production prototypes of the Consolidated Vultee XP-81 fighter, but this program was also canceled by VJ Day, with 80% of the engineering work completed.

== Rocket-powered fighters ==
The first rocket-powered aircraft was the Lippisch Ente, which made a successful maiden flight in March 1928. The only pure rocket aircraft ever mass-produced was the Messerschmitt Me 163B Komet in 1944, one of several German World War II projects aimed at developing high speed, point-defense aircraft. Later variants of the Me 262 (C-1a and C-2b) were also fitted with "mixed-power" jet/rocket powerplants, while earlier models were fitted with rocket boosters, but were not mass-produced with these modifications.

The USSR experimented with a rocket-powered interceptor in the years immediately following World War II, the Mikoyan-Gurevich I-270. Only two were built.

In the 1950s, the British developed mixed-power jet designs employing both rocket and jet engines to cover the performance gap that existed in turbojet designs. The rocket was the main engine for delivering the speed and height required for high-speed interception of high-level bombers and the turbojet gave increased fuel economy in other parts of flight, most notably to ensure the aircraft was able to make a powered landing rather than risking an unpredictable gliding return.

The Saunders-Roe SR.53 was a successful design, and was planned for production when economics forced the British to curtail most aircraft programs in the late 1950s. Furthermore, rapid advancements in jet engine technology rendered mixed-power aircraft designs like Saunders-Roe's SR.53 (and the following SR.177) obsolete. The American Republic XF-91 Thunderceptor –the first U.S. fighter to exceed Mach 1 in level flight– met a similar fate for the same reason, and no hybrid rocket-and-jet-engine fighter design has ever been placed into service.

== Jet-powered fighters ==
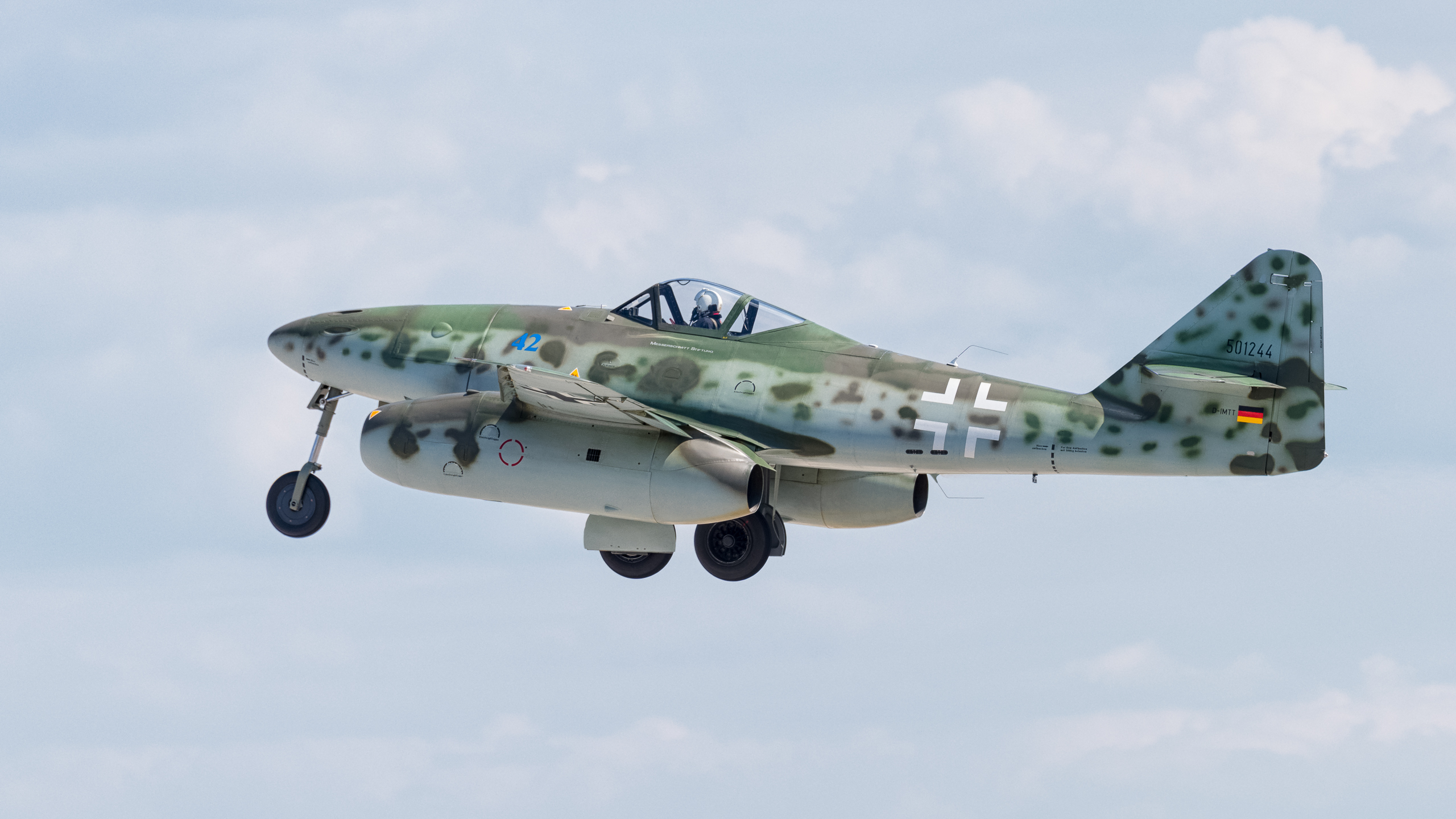
The Messerschmitt Me 262 was one of the fastest aircraft of WWII and the first mass-produced aircraft to use jet engine technology.

It has become common in the aviation community to classify jet fighters by "generations" for historical purposes. No official definitions of these generations exist; rather, they represent the notion of stages in the development of fighter-design approaches, performance capabilities, and technological evolution. Different authors have packed jet fighters into different generations. For example, Richard P. Hallion of the Secretary of the US Air Force's Action Group classified the F-16 as a sixth-generation jet fighter.

The timeframes associated with each generation remain inexact and are only indicative of the period during which their design philosophies and technology employment enjoyed a prevailing influence on fighter design and development. These timeframes also encompass the peak period of service entry for such aircraft.

=== 1940s–1950s: First-generation ===
The first generation of jet fighters comprised the initial, subsonic jet-fighter designs introduced late in World War II (1939–1945) and in the early post-war period. They differed little from their piston-engine counterparts in appearance, and many employed unswept wings. Guns and cannon remained the principal armament. The need to obtain a decisive advantage in maximum speed pushed the development of turbojet-powered aircraft forward. Top speeds for fighters rose steadily throughout World War II as more powerful piston engines developed, and they approached transonic flight-speeds where the efficiency of propellers drops off, making further speed increases nearly impossible.

The first jets developed during World War II and saw combat in the last two years of the war. Messerschmitt developed the first operational jet fighter, the Me 262A, primarily serving with the Luftwaffe's JG 7, the world's first jet-fighter wing. It was considerably faster than contemporary piston-driven aircraft, and in the hands of a competent pilot, proved quite difficult for Allied pilots to defeat. The Luftwaffe never deployed the design in numbers sufficient to stop the Allied air campaign, and a combination of fuel shortages, pilot losses, and technical difficulties with the engines kept the number of sorties low. Nevertheless, the Me 262 indicated the obsolescence of piston-driven aircraft. Spurred by reports of the German jets, Britain's Gloster Meteor entered production soon after, and the two entered service around the same time in 1944. Meteors commonly served to intercept the V-1 flying bomb, as they were faster than available piston-engine fighters at the low altitudes used by the flying bombs. Nearer the end of World War II, the first military jet-powered light-fighter design, the Luftwaffe intended the Heinkel He 162A Spatz (sparrow) to serve as a simple jet fighter for German home defense, with a few examples seeing squadron service with JG 1 by April 1945. By the end of the war almost all work on piston-powered fighters had ended. A few designs combining piston- and jet-engines for propulsion – such as the Ryan FR Fireball – saw brief use, but by the end of the 1940s virtually all new fighters were jet-powered.

Despite their advantages, the early jet-fighters were far from perfect. The operational lifespan of turbines were very short and engines were temperamental, while power could be adjusted only slowly and acceleration was poor (even if top speed was higher) compared to the final generation of piston fighters. Many squadrons of piston-engine fighters remained in service until the early to mid-1950s, even in the air forces of the major powers (though the types retained were the best of the World War II designs). Innovations including ejection seats, air brakes and all-moving tailplanes became widespread in this period.

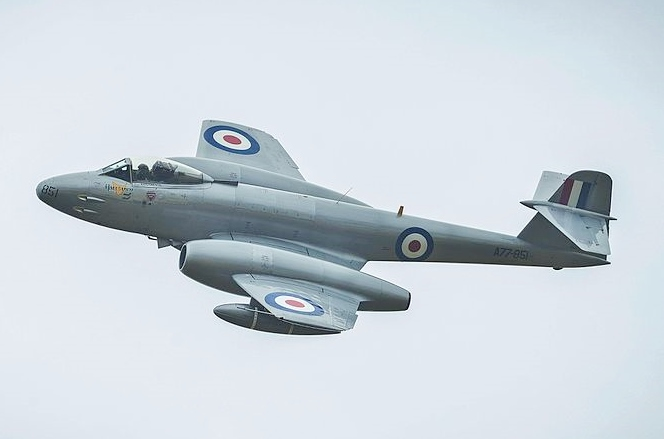
The Gloster Meteor was Britain's first jet fighter and the Allies' only jet aircraft used during World War II

The Americans began using jet fighters operationally after World War II, the wartime Bell P-59 having proven a failure. The Lockheed P-80 Shooting Star (soon redesignated F-80) was more prone to wave drag than the swept-wing Me 262, but had a cruise speed (660 km/h (410 mph)) as high as the maximum speed attainable by many piston-engine fighters. The British designed several new jets, including the distinctive single-engine twin boom de Havilland Vampire which Britain sold to the air forces of many nations.

The British transferred the technology of the Rolls-Royce Nene jet-engine to the Soviets, who soon put it to use in their advanced Mikoyan-Gurevich MiG-15 fighter, which used fully swept wings that allowed flying closer to the speed of sound than straight-winged designs such as the F-80. The MiG-15s' top speed of 1,075 km/h (668 mph) proved quite a shock to the American F-80 pilots who encountered them in the Korean War, along with their armament of two 23 mm (0.91 in) cannons and a single 37 mm (1.5 in) cannon. Nevertheless, in the first jet-versus-jet dogfight, which occurred during the Korean War on 8 November 1950, an F-80 shot down two North Korean MiG-15s.

The Americans responded by rushing their own swept-wing fighter – the North American F-86 Sabre – into battle against the MiGs, which had similar transsonic performance. The two aircraft had different strengths and weaknesses, but were similar enough that victory could go either way. While the Sabres focused primarily on downing MiGs and scored favorably against those flown by the poorly trained North Koreans, the MiGs in turn decimated US bomber formations and forced the withdrawal of numerous American types from operational service.

The world's navies also transitioned to jets during this period, despite the need for catapult-launching of the new aircraft. The U.S. Navy adopted the Grumman F9F Panther as their primary jet fighter in the Korean War period, and it was one of the first jet fighters to employ an afterburner. The de Havilland Sea Vampire became the Royal Navy's first jet fighter. Radar was used on specialized night-fighters such as the Douglas F3D Skyknight, which also downed MiGs over Korea, and later fitted to the McDonnell F2H Banshee and swept-wing Vought F7U Cutlass and McDonnell F3H Demon as all-weather / night fighters. Early versions of infrared (IR) air-to-air missiles (AAMs) such as the AIM-9 Sidewinder and radar-guided missiles such as the AIM-7 Sparrow whose descendants remain in use as of 2021, were first introduced on swept-wing subsonic Demon and Cutlass naval fighters.

=== 1950s–1960s: Second-generation ===
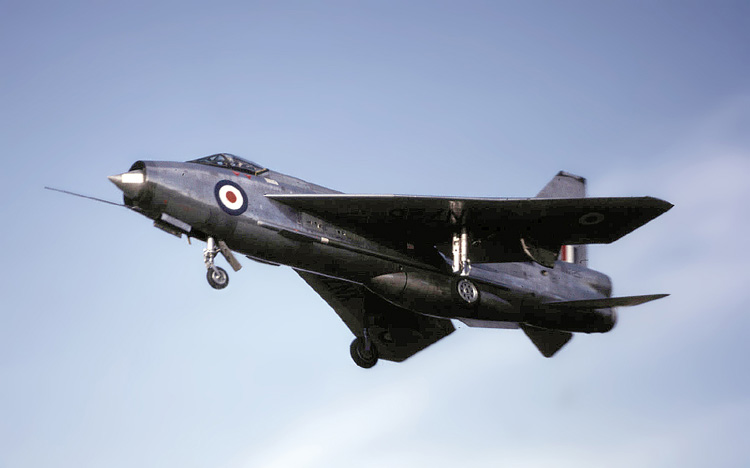
English Electric Lightning

Technological breakthroughs, lessons learned from the aerial battles of the Korean War, and a focus on conducting operations in a nuclear warfare environment shaped the development of second-generation fighters. Technological advances in aerodynamics, propulsion and aerospace building-materials (primarily aluminum alloys) permitted designers to experiment with aeronautical innovations such as swept wings, delta wings, and area-ruled fuselages. Widespread use of afterburning turbojet engines made these the first production aircraft to break the sound barrier, and the ability to sustain supersonic speeds in level flight became a common capability among fighters of this generation.

Fighter designs also took advantage of new electronics technologies that made effective radars small enough to carry aboard smaller aircraft. Onboard radars permitted detection of enemy aircraft beyond visual range, thereby improving the handoff of targets by longer-ranged ground-based warning- and tracking-radars. Similarly, advances in guided-missile development allowed air-to-air missiles to begin supplementing the gun as the primary offensive weapon for the first time in fighter history. During this period, passive-homing infrared-guided (IR) missiles became commonplace, but early IR missile sensors had poor sensitivity and a very narrow field of view (typically no more than 30°), which limited their effective use to only close-range, tail-chase engagements. Radar-guided (RF) missiles were introduced as well, but early examples proved unreliable. These semi-active radar homing (SARH) missiles could track and intercept an enemy aircraft "painted" by the launching aircraft's onboard radar. Medium- and long-range RF air-to-air missiles promised to open up a new dimension of "beyond-visual-range" (BVR) combat, and much effort concentrated on further development of this technology.

The prospect of a potential third world war featuring large mechanized armies and nuclear-weapon strikes led to a degree of specialization along two design approaches: interceptors, such as the English Electric Lightning and Mikoyan-Gurevich MiG-21F; and fighter-bombers, such as the Republic F-105 Thunderchief and the Sukhoi Su-7B. Dogfighting, per se, became de-emphasized in both cases. The interceptor was an outgrowth of the vision that guided missiles would completely replace guns and combat would take place at beyond-visual ranges. As a result, strategists designed interceptors with a large missile-payload and a powerful radar, sacrificing agility in favor of high speed, altitude ceiling and rate of climb. With a primary air-defense role, emphasis was placed on the ability to intercept strategic bombers flying at high altitudes. Specialized point-defense interceptors often had limited range and few, if any, ground-attack capabilities. Fighter-bombers could swing between air-superiority and ground-attack roles, and were often designed for a high-speed, low-altitude dash to deliver their ordnance. Television- and IR-guided air-to-surface missiles were introduced to augment traditional gravity bombs, and some were also equipped to deliver a nuclear bomb.

=== 1960s–1970s: Third-generation jet fighters ===
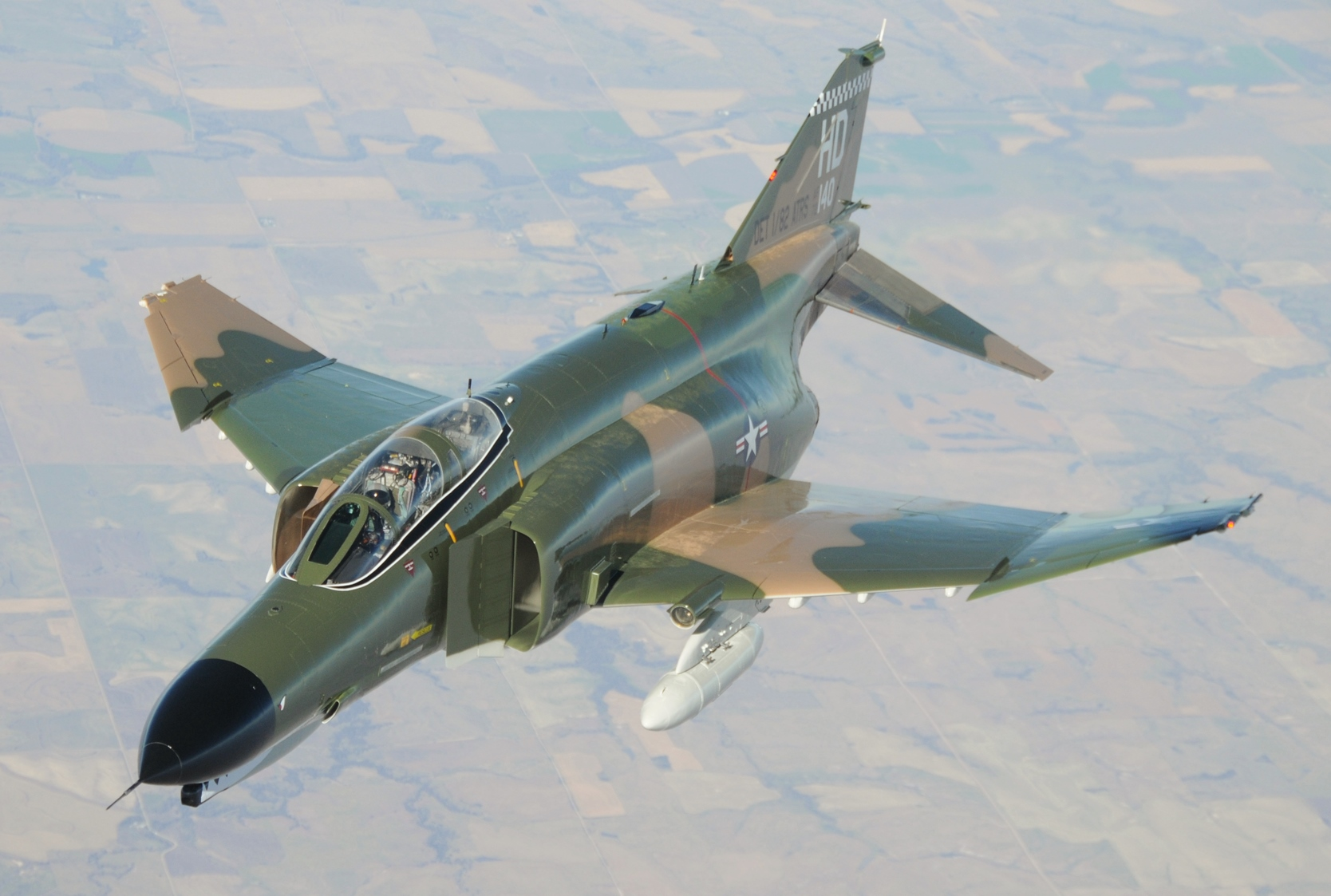
U.S. Air Force McDonnell Douglas F-4 Phantom II

The third generation witnessed continued maturation of second-generation innovations, but it is most marked by renewed emphases on maneuverability and on traditional ground-attack capabilities. Over the course of the 1960s, increasing combat experience with guided missiles demonstrated that combat would devolve into close-in dogfights. Analog avionics began to appear, replacing older "steam-gauge" cockpit instrumentation. Enhancements to the aerodynamic performance of third-generation fighters included flight control surfaces such as canards, powered slats, and blown flaps. A number of technologies would be tried for vertical/short takeoff and landing, but thrust vectoring would be successful on the Harrier.

Growth in air-combat capability focused on the introduction of improved air-to-air missiles, radar systems, and other avionics. While guns remained standard equipment (early models of F-4 being a notable exception), air-to-air missiles became the primary weapons for air-superiority fighters, which employed more sophisticated radars and medium-range RF AAMs to achieve greater "stand-off" ranges, however, kill probabilities proved unexpectedly low for RF missiles due to poor reliability and improved electronic countermeasures (ECM) for spoofing radar seekers. Infrared-homing AAMs saw their fields of view expand to 45°, which strengthened their tactical usability. Nevertheless, the low dogfight loss-exchange ratios experienced by American fighters in the skies over Vietnam led the U.S. Navy to establish its famous "TOPGUN" fighter-weapons school, which provided a graduate-level curriculum to train fleet fighter-pilots in advanced Air Combat Maneuvering (ACM) and Dissimilar air combat training (DACT) tactics and techniques. This era also saw an expansion in ground-attack capabilities, principally in guided missiles, and witnessed the introduction of the first truly effective avionics for enhanced ground attack, including terrain-avoidance systems. Air-to-surface missiles (ASM) equipped with electro-optical (E-O) contrast seekers – such as the initial model of the widely used AGM-65 Maverick – became standard weapons, and laser-guided bombs (LGBs) became widespread in an effort to improve precision-attack capabilities. Guidance for such precision-guided munitions (PGM) was provided by externally mounted targeting pods, which were introduced in the mid-1960s.

The third generation also led to the development of new automatic-fire weapons, primarily chain-guns that use an electric motor to drive the mechanism of a cannon. This allowed a plane to carry a single multi-barrel weapon (such as the 20 mm (0.79 in) Vulcan), and provided greater accuracy and rates of fire. Powerplant reliability increased, and jet engines became "smokeless" to make it harder to sight aircraft at long distances.

Dedicated ground-attack aircraft (like the Grumman A-6 Intruder, SEPECAT Jaguar and LTV A-7 Corsair II) offered longer range, more sophisticated night-attack systems or lower cost than supersonic fighters. With variable-geometry wings, the supersonic F-111 introduced the Pratt & Whitney TF30, the first turbofan equipped with afterburner. The ambitious project sought to create a versatile common fighter for many roles and services. It would serve well as an all-weather bomber, but lacked the performance to defeat other fighters. The McDonnell F-4 Phantom was designed to capitalize on radar and missile technology as an all-weather interceptor, but emerged as a versatile strike-bomber nimble enough to prevail in air combat, adopted by the U.S. Navy, Air Force and Marine Corps. Despite numerous shortcomings that would not be fully addressed until newer fighters, the Phantom claimed 280 aerial kills (more than any other U.S. fighter) over Vietnam. With range and payload capabilities that rivaled that of World War II bombers such as B-24 Liberator, the Phantom would become a highly successful multirole aircraft.

=== 1970s–2000s: Fourth-generation ===
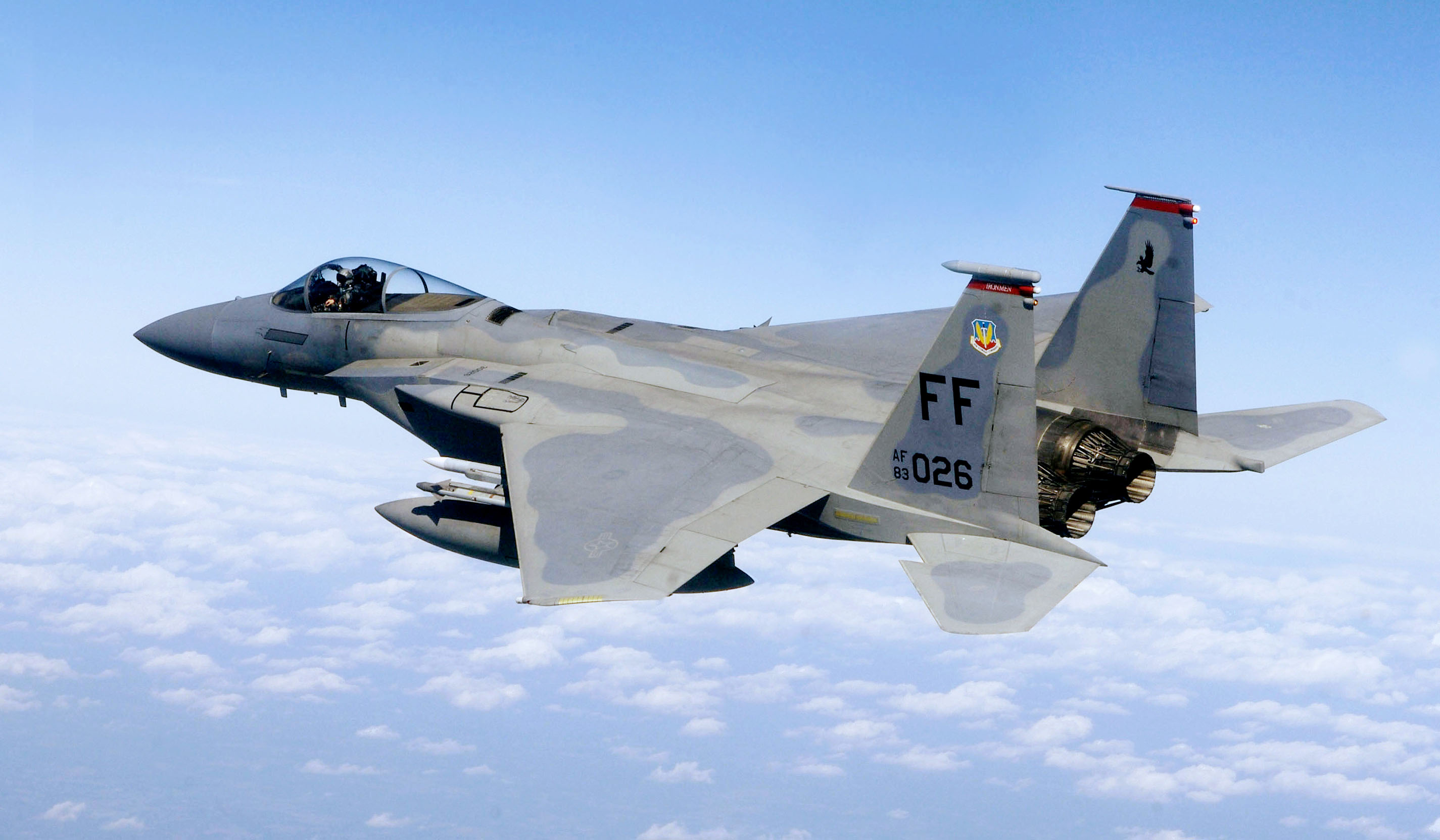
U.S. Air Force McDonnell F-15 Eagle

Fourth-generation fighters continued the trend toward multirole configurations, and were equipped with increasingly sophisticated avionics- and weapon-systems. Fighter designs were significantly influenced by the energy–maneuverability (E–M) theory developed by Colonel John Boyd and mathematician Thomas Christie, based upon Boyd's combat experience in the Korean War and as a fighter-tactics instructor during the 1960s. E-M theory emphasized the value of aircraft-specific energy maintenance as an advantage in fighter combat. Boyd perceived maneuverability as the primary means of getting "inside" an adversary's decision-making cycle, a process Boyd called the "OODA loop" (for "Observation-Orientation-Decision-Action"). This approach emphasized aircraft designs capable of performing "fast transients" – quick changes in speed, altitude, and direction – as opposed to relying chiefly on high speed alone.

E–M characteristics were first applied to the McDonnell Douglas F-15 Eagle, but Boyd and his supporters believed these performance parameters called for a small, lightweight aircraft with a larger, higher-lift wing. The small size would minimize drag and increase the thrust-to-weight ratio, while the larger wing would minimize wing loading; while the reduced wing loading tends to lower top speed and can cut range, it increases payload capacity and the range reduction can be compensated for by increased fuel in the larger wing. The efforts of Boyd's "Fighter mafia" would result in the General Dynamics F-16 Fighting Falcon (now Lockheed Martin's).

The F-16's maneuverability was further enhanced by its slight aerodynamic instability. This technique, called "relaxed static stability" (RSS), was made possible by introduction of the "fly-by-wire" (FBW) flight-control system (FLCS), which in turn was enabled by advances in computers and in system-integration techniques. Analog avionics, required to enable FBW operations, became a fundamental requirement, but began to be replaced by digital flight-control systems in the latter half of the 1980s. Likewise, Full Authority Digital Engine Controls (FADEC) to electronically manage powerplant performance was introduced with the Pratt & Whitney F100 turbofan. The F-16's sole reliance on electronics and wires to relay flight commands, instead of the usual cables and mechanical linkage controls, earned it the sobriquet of "the electric jet". Electronic FLCS and FADEC quickly became essential components of all subsequent fighter designs.

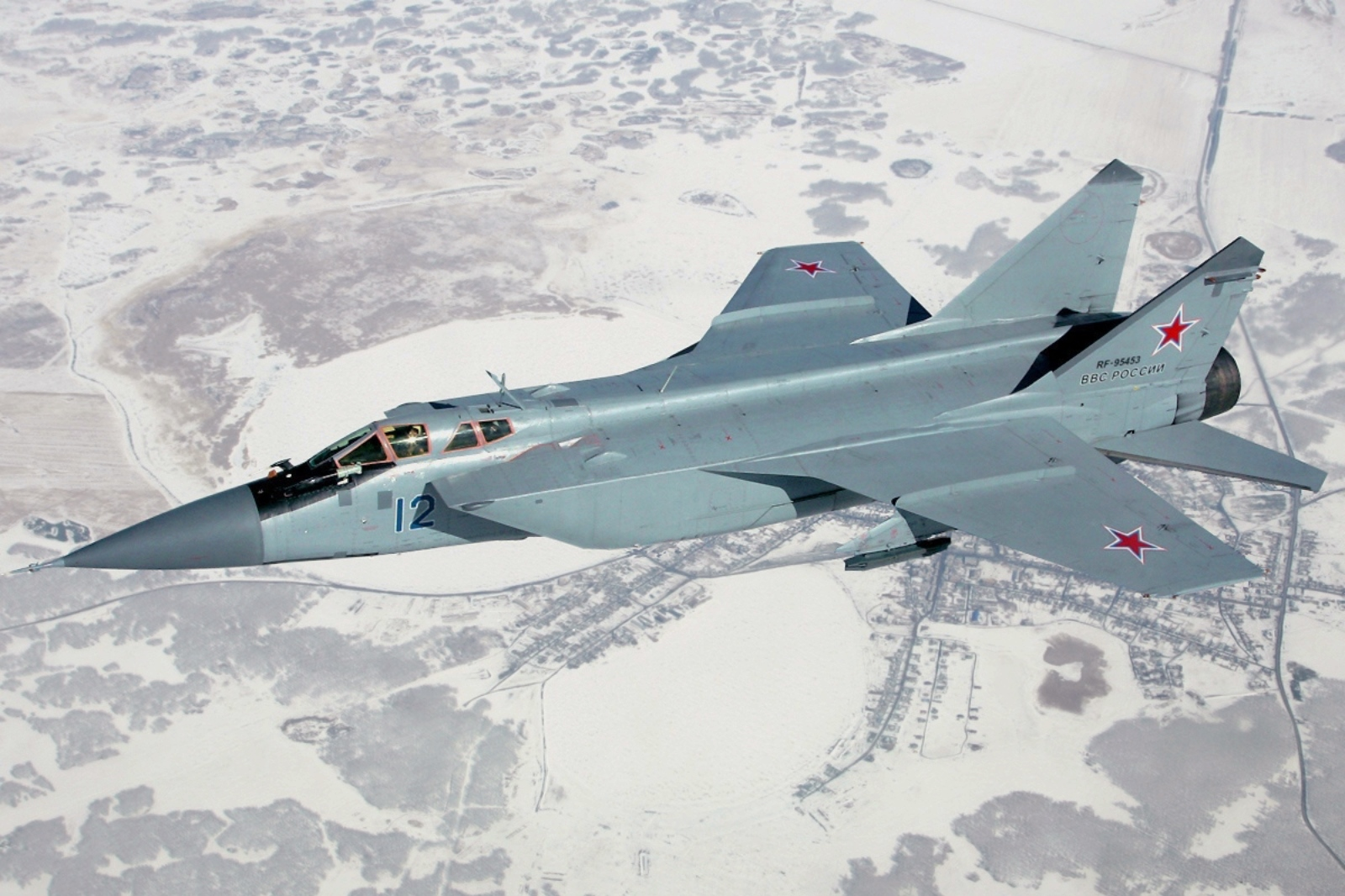
A MiG-31 of the Russian Air Force

Other innovative technologies introduced in fourth-generation fighters included pulse-Doppler fire-control radars (providing a "look-down/shoot-down" capability), head-up displays (HUD), "hands on throttle-and-stick" (HOTAS) controls, and multi-function displays (MFD), all essential equipment as of 2019. Aircraft designers began to incorporate composite materials in the form of bonded-aluminum honeycomb structural elements and graphite epoxy laminate skins to reduce weight. Infrared search-and-track (IRST) sensors became widespread for air-to-ground weapons delivery, and appeared for air-to-air combat as well. "All-aspect" IR AAM became standard air superiority weapons, which permitted engagement of enemy aircraft from any angle (although the field of view remained relatively limited). The first long-range active-radar-homing RF AAM entered service with the AIM-54 Phoenix, which solely equipped the Grumman F-14 Tomcat, one of the few variable-sweep-wing fighter designs to enter production. Even with the tremendous advancement of air-to-air missiles in this era, internal guns were standard equipment.

Another revolution came in the form of a stronger reliance on ease of maintenance, which led to standardization of parts, reductions in the numbers of access panels and lubrication points, and overall parts reduction in more complicated equipment like the engines. Some early jet fighters required 50 man-hours of work by a ground crew for every hour the aircraft was in the air; later models substantially reduced this to allow faster turn-around times and more sorties in a day. Some modern military aircraft only require 10-man-hours of work per hour of flight time, and others are even more efficient.

Aerodynamic innovations included variable-camber wings and exploitation of the vortex lift effect to achieve higher angles of attack through the addition of leading-edge extension devices such as strakes.

Unlike interceptors of the previous eras, most fourth-generation air-superiority fighters were designed to be agile dogfighters (although the Mikoyan MiG-31 and Panavia Tornado ADV are notable exceptions). The continually rising cost of fighters, however, continued to emphasize the value of multirole fighters. The need for both types of fighters led to the "high/low mix" concept, which envisioned a high-capability and high-cost core of dedicated air-superiority fighters (like the F-15 and Su-27) supplemented by a larger contingent of lower-cost multi-role fighters (such as the F-16 and MiG-29).

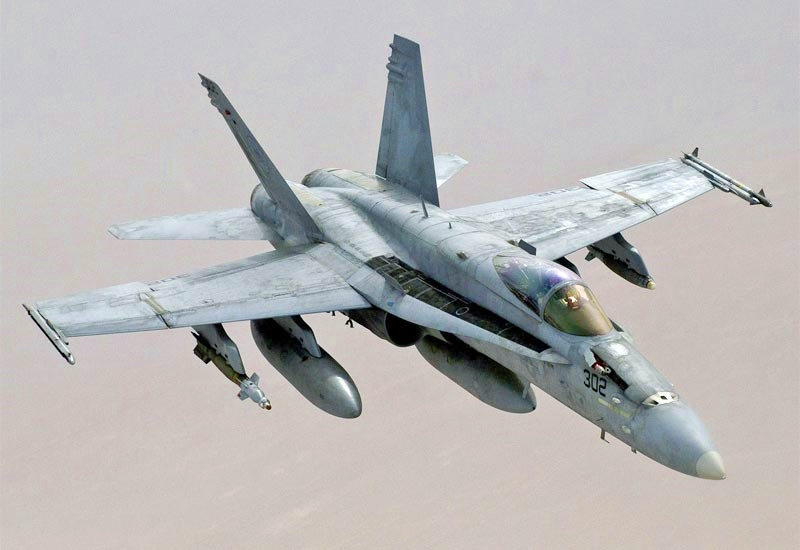
An F/A-18C Hornet

Most fourth-generation fighters, such as the McDonnell Douglas F/A-18 Hornet, HAL Tejas, JF-17 and Dassault Mirage 2000, are true multirole warplanes, designed as such from the start. This was facilitated by multimode avionics that could switch seamlessly between air and ground modes. The earlier approaches of adding on strike capabilities or designing separate models specialized for different roles generally became passé (with the Panavia Tornado being an exception in this regard). Attack roles were generally assigned to dedicated ground-attack aircraft such as the Sukhoi Su-25 and the A-10 Thunderbolt II.

A typical US Air Force fighter wing of the period might contain a mix of one air superiority squadron (F-15C), one strike fighter squadron (F-15E), and two multirole fighter squadrons (F-16C). Perhaps the most novel technology introduced for combat aircraft was stealth, which involves the use of special "low-observable" (L-O) materials and design techniques to reduce the susceptibility of an aircraft to detection by the enemy's sensor systems, particularly radars. The first stealth aircraft introduced were the Lockheed F-117 Nighthawk attack aircraft (introduced in 1983) and the Northrop Grumman B-2 Spirit bomber (first flew in 1989). Although no stealthy fighters per se appeared among the fourth generation, some radar-absorbent coatings and other L-O treatments developed for these programs are reported to have been subsequently applied to fourth-generation fighters.

==== 1990s–2000s: 4.5-generation ====
The end of the Cold War in December 1991 led many governments to significantly decrease military spending as a "peace dividend". Air force inventories were cut. Research and development programs working on "fifth-generation" fighters took serious hits. Many programs were canceled during the first half of the 1990s, and those that survived were "stretched out". While the practice of slowing the pace of development reduces annual investment expenses, it comes at the penalty of increased overall program and unit costs over the long-term. In this instance, however, it also permitted designers to make use of the tremendous achievements being made in the fields of computers, avionics and other flight electronics, which had become possible largely due to the advances made in microchip and semiconductor technologies in the 1980s and 1990s. This opportunity enabled designers to develop fourth-generation designs – or redesigns – with significantly enhanced capabilities. These improved designs have become known as "Generation 4.5" fighters, recognizing their intermediate nature between the 4th and 5th generations, and their contribution in furthering development of individual fifth-generation technologies.

The primary characteristics of this sub-generation are the application of advanced digital avionics and aerospace materials, modest signature reduction (primarily RF "stealth"), and highly integrated systems and weapons. These fighters have been designed to operate in a "network-centric" battlefield environment and are principally multirole aircraft. Key weapons technologies introduced include beyond-visual-range (BVR) AAMs; Global Positioning System (GPS)–guided weapons, solid-state phased-array radars; helmet-mounted sights; and improved secure, jamming-resistant datalinks. Thrust vectoring to further improve transient maneuvering capabilities has also been adopted by many 4.5th generation fighters, and uprated powerplants have enabled some designs to achieve a degree of "supercruise" ability. Stealth characteristics are focused primarily on frontal-aspect radar cross section (RCS) signature-reduction techniques including radar-absorbent materials (RAM), L-O coatings and limited shaping techniques.

"Half-generation" designs are either based on existing airframes or are based on new airframes following similar design theory to previous iterations; however, these modifications have introduced the structural use of composite materials to reduce weight, greater fuel fractions to increase range, and signature reduction treatments to achieve lower RCS compared to their predecessors. Prime examples of such aircraft, which are based on new airframe designs making extensive use of carbon-fiber composites, include the Eurofighter Typhoon, Dassault Rafale, Saab JAS 39 Gripen, HAL Tejas Mark 1A and JF-17 Thunder.

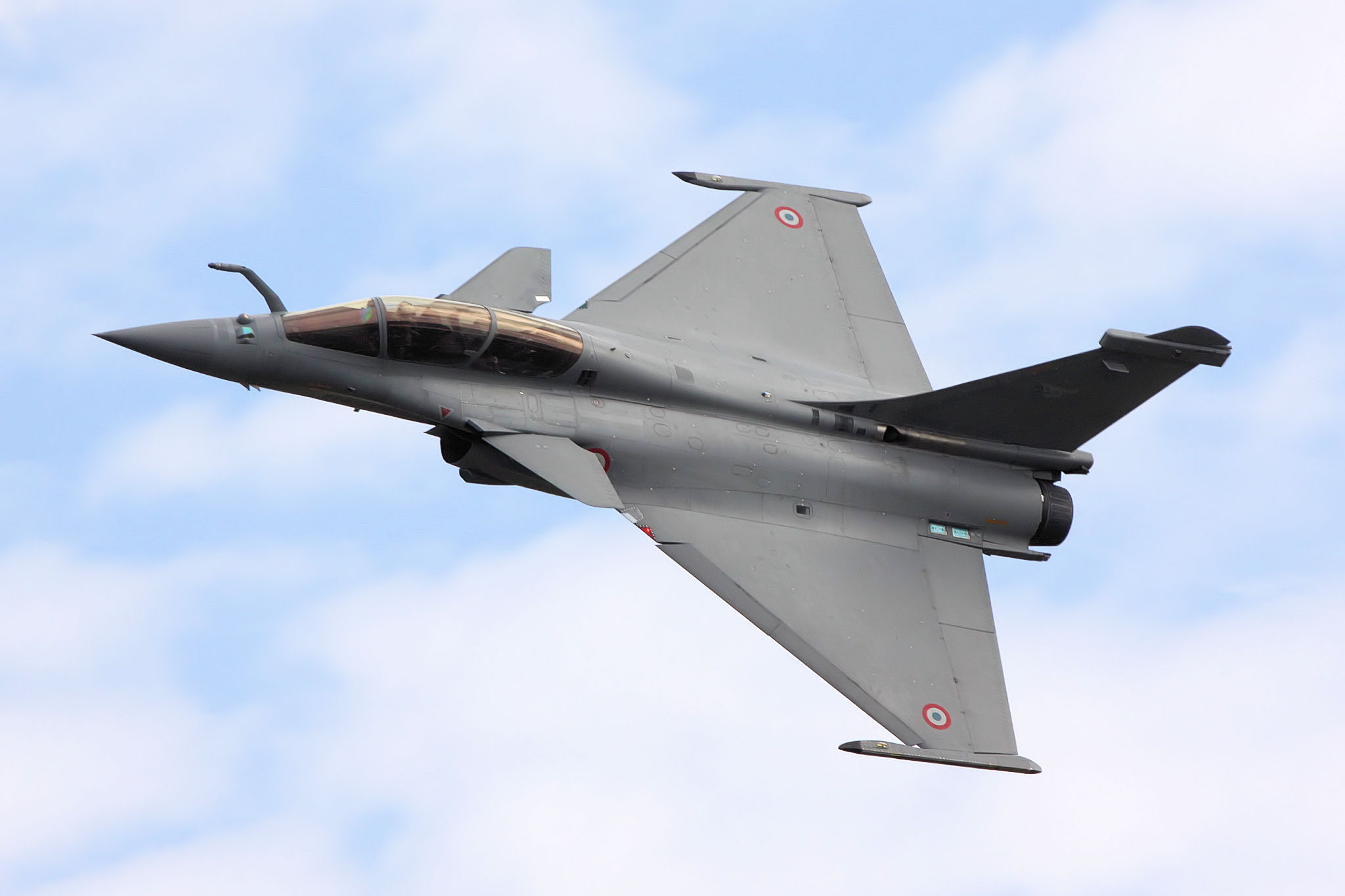
A Dassault Rafale over RIAT in 2009

Apart from these fighter jets, most of the 4.5 generation aircraft are actually modified variants of existing airframes from the earlier fourth generation fighter jets. Such fighter jets are generally heavier and examples include the Boeing F/A-18E/F Super Hornet, which is an evolution of the F/A-18 Hornet, the F-15E Strike Eagle, which is a ground-attack/multi-role variant of the F-15 Eagle, the Su-30SM and Su-35S modified variants of the Sukhoi Su-27, and the MiG-35 upgraded version of the Mikoyan MiG-29. The Su-30SM/Su-35S and MiG-35 feature thrust vectoring engine nozzles to enhance maneuvering. The upgraded version of F-16 is also considered a member of the 4.5 generation aircraft.

Generation 4.5 fighters first entered service in the early 1990s, and most of them are still being produced and evolved. It is quite possible that they may continue in production alongside fifth-generation fighters due to the expense of developing the advanced level of stealth technology needed to achieve aircraft designs featuring very low observables (VLO), which is one of the defining features of fifth-generation fighters. Of the 4.5th generation designs, the Strike Eagle, Super Hornet, Typhoon, Gripen, and Rafale have been used in combat.

The U.S. government has defined 4.5 generation fighter aircraft as those that "(1) have advanced capabilities, including— (A) AESA radar; (B) high capacity data-link; and (C) enhanced avionics; and (2) have the ability to deploy current and reasonably foreseeable advanced armaments."

=== 2000s–2020s: Fifth-generation ===
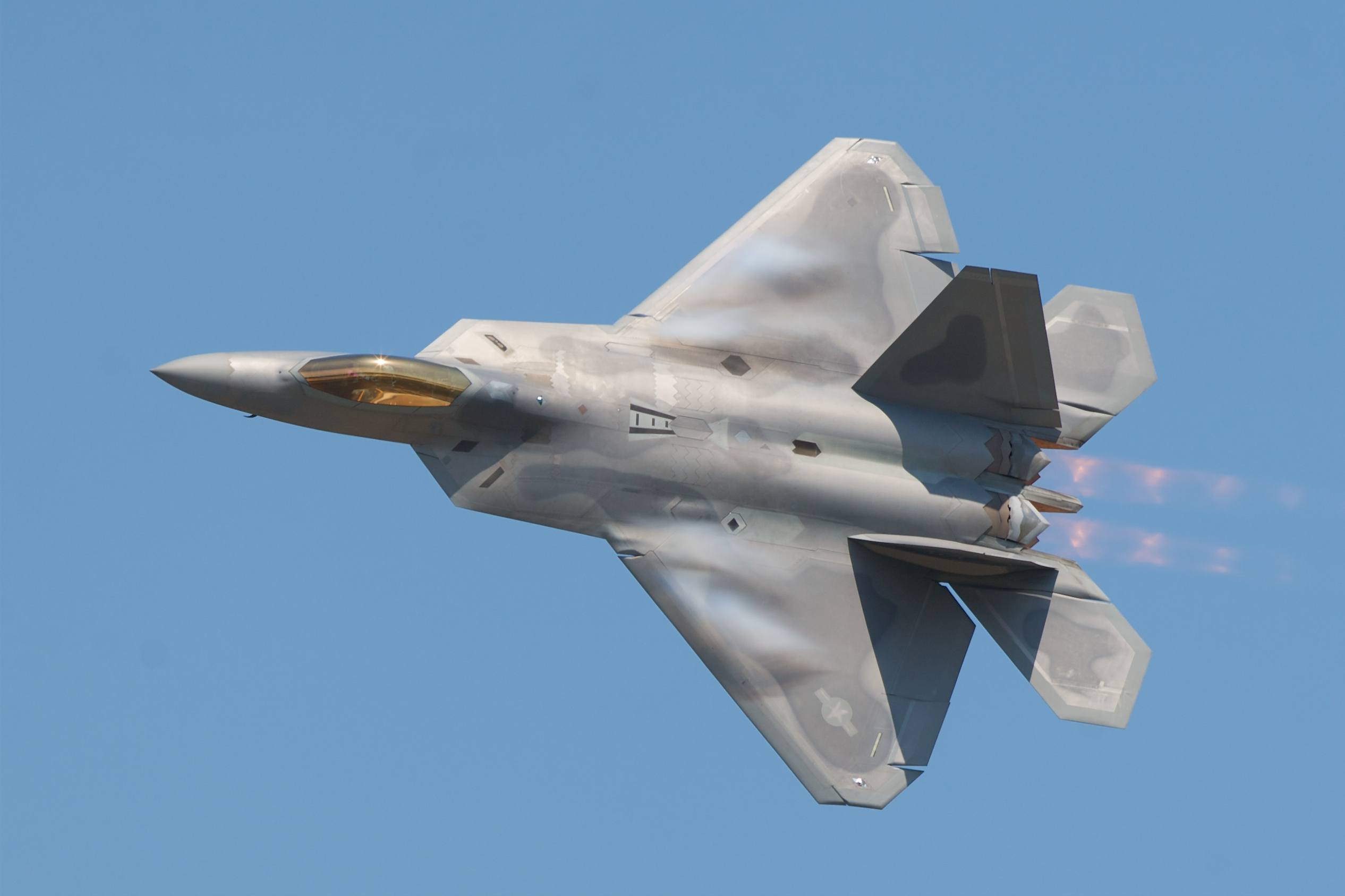
Lockheed Martin/Boeing F-22 Raptor at the 2008 Joint Services Open House airshow

Currently the cutting edge of fighter design, fifth-generation fighters are characterized by being designed from the start to operate in a network-centric combat environment, and to feature extremely low, all-aspect, multi-spectral signatures employing advanced materials and shaping techniques. They have multifunction AESA radars with high-bandwidth, low-probability of intercept (LPI) data transmission capabilities. The infrared search and track sensors incorporated for air-to-air combat as well as for air-to-ground weapons delivery in the 4.5th generation fighters are now fused in with other sensors for Situational Awareness IRST or SAIRST, which constantly tracks all targets of interest around the aircraft so the pilot need not guess when he glances. These sensors, along with advanced avionics, glass cockpits, helmet-mounted sights (not currently on F-22), and improved secure, jamming-resistant LPI datalinks are highly integrated to provide multi-platform, multi-sensor data fusion for vastly improved situational awareness while easing the pilot's workload. Avionics suites rely on extensive use of very high-speed integrated circuit (VHSIC) technology, common modules, and high-speed data buses. Overall, the integration of all these elements is claimed to provide fifth-generation fighters with a "first-look, first-shot, first-kill capability".

A key attribute of fifth-generation fighters is a small radar cross-section. Great care has been taken in designing its layout and internal structure to minimize RCS over a broad bandwidth of detection and tracking radar frequencies; furthermore, to maintain its VLO signature during combat operations, primary weapons are carried in internal weapon bays that are only briefly opened to permit weapon launch. Furthermore, stealth technology has advanced to the point where it can be employed without a tradeoff with aerodynamics performance, in contrast to previous stealth efforts. Some attention has also been paid to reducing IR signatures, especially on the F-22. Detailed information on these signature-reduction techniques is classified, but in general includes special shaping approaches, thermoset and thermoplastic materials, extensive structural use of advanced composites, conformal sensors, heat-resistant coatings, low-observable wire meshes to cover intake and cooling vents, heat ablating tiles on the exhaust troughs (seen on the Northrop YF-23), and coating internal and external metal areas with radar-absorbent materials and paint (RAM/RAP).

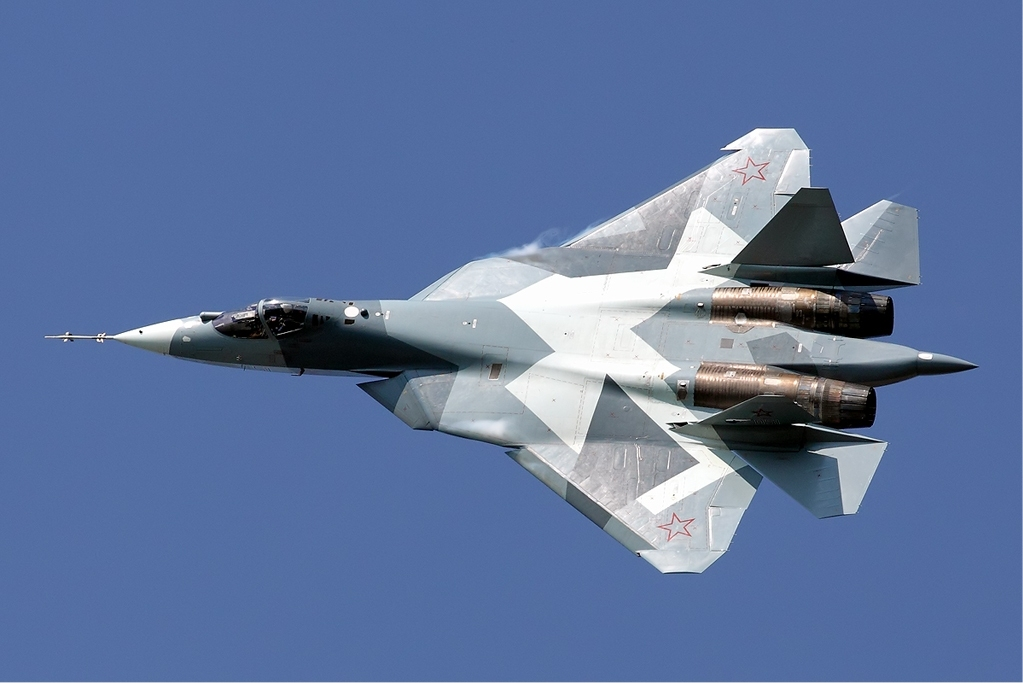
A Sukhoi Su-57 of the Russian Air Force

The AESA radar offers unique capabilities for fighters (and it is also quickly becoming essential for Generation 4.5 aircraft designs, as well as being retrofitted onto some fourth-generation aircraft). In addition to its high resistance to ECM and LPI features, it enables the fighter to function as a sort of "mini-AWACS", providing high-gain electronic support measures (ESM) and electronic warfare (EW) jamming functions. Other technologies common to this latest generation of fighters includes integrated electronic warfare system (INEWS) technology, integrated communications, navigation, and identification (CNI) avionics technology, centralized "vehicle health monitoring" systems for ease of maintenance, fiber optics data transmission, stealth technology and even hovering capabilities. Maneuver performance remains important and is enhanced by thrust-vectoring, which also helps reduce takeoff and landing distances. Supercruise may or may not be featured; it permits flight at supersonic speeds without the use of the afterburner – a device that significantly increases IR signature when used in full military power.

Such aircraft are sophisticated and expensive. The fifth generation was ushered in by the Lockheed Martin/Boeing F-22 Raptor in late 2005. The U.S. Air Force originally planned to acquire 650 F-22s, but now only 187 will be built. As a result, its unit flyaway cost (FAC) is around US$150 million. To spread the development costs – and production base – more broadly, the Joint Strike Fighter (JSF) program enrolls eight other countries as cost- and risk-sharing partners. Altogether, the nine partner nations anticipate procuring over 3,000 Lockheed Martin F-35 Lightning II fighters at an anticipated average FAC of $80–85 million. The F-35, however, is designed to be a family of three aircraft, a conventional takeoff and landing (CTOL) fighter, a short takeoff and vertical landing (STOVL) fighter, and a Catapult Assisted Take Off But Arrested Recovery (CATOBAR) fighter, each of which has a different unit price and slightly varying specifications in terms of fuel capacity (and therefore range), size and payload.

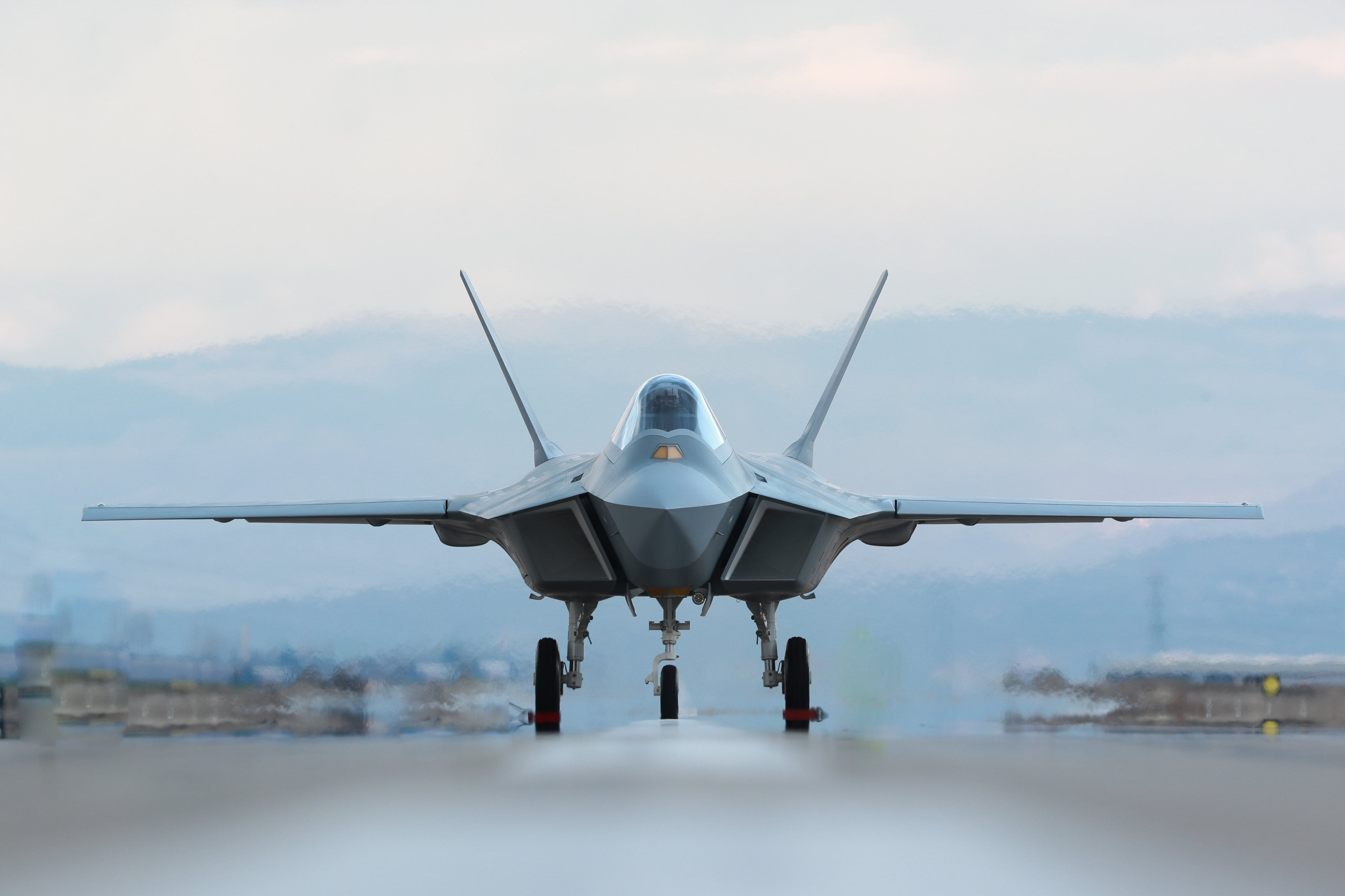
Turkish TAI TF Kaan during runway tests at its facilities in Ankara on 17 March 2023

Other countries have initiated fifth-generation fighter development projects. In December 2010, it was discovered that China is developing the 5th generation fighter Chengdu J-20. The J-20 took its maiden flight in January 2011. The Shenyang J-35 took its maiden flight on 31 October 2012, and developed a carrier-based version based on Chinese aircraft carriers. United Aircraft Corporation with Russia's Mikoyan LMFS and Sukhoi Su-75 Checkmate plan, Sukhoi Su-57 became the first fifth-generation fighter jets in service with the Russian Aerospace Forces on 2020, and launch missiles in the Russo-Ukrainian War in 2022. Japan is exploring its technical feasibility to produce fifth-generation fighters. India is developing the Advanced Medium Combat Aircraft (AMCA), a medium weight stealth fighter jet designated to enter into serial production by late 2030s. India also had initiated a joint fifth generation heavy fighter with Russia called the FGFA. As of 2018 May, the project is suspected to have not yielded desired progress or results for India and has been put on hold or dropped altogether. Other countries considering fielding an indigenous or semi-indigenous advanced fifth generation aircraft include South Korea, Sweden, Turkey and Pakistan.

=== 2020s–present: Sixth-generation ===
As of June 2026, China, the United States, Japan, Italy, the United Kingdom and Russia are working on the development of sixth-generation aircraft programs. China is the first nation to publicly fly prototypes of sixth-generation fighter aircraft, tentatively named the Chengdu J-36 and Shenyang J-50.

The United States Air Force in 2025 selected the Boeing F-47 design from its Next Generation Air Dominance program, started in 2014 to replace the F-22 Raptor. The United States Navy is also pursuing the F/A-XX program to replace its F/A-18E/F Super Hornets and complement the F-35C beginning in the 2030s.

According to previous reports, the first sixth-generation jet fighter of the United States Navy was originally expected to enter service in the 2025–30 period. The USAF seeks a new fighter for the 2030–50 period named the "Next Generation Tactical Aircraft" ("Next Gen TACAIR"). The US Navy was originally planned to replace F/A-18E/F Super Hornets beginning in 2025 with the Next Generation Air Dominance air superiority fighter.

The United Kingdom's proposed stealth fighter is being developed along with Japan and Italy in Team Tempest, consisting of BAE Systems, Rolls-Royce, Leonardo S.p.A. and MBDA. The aircraft is intended to enter service in 2035. Saudi Arabia is also looking to get involved in Team Tempest.

Within the Future Combat Air System (FCAS) program, France, Germany, and Spain were jointly working on a sixth-generation fighter known as the Next-Generation Fighter (NGF) until the project was cancelled in 2026.

== Weapons ==
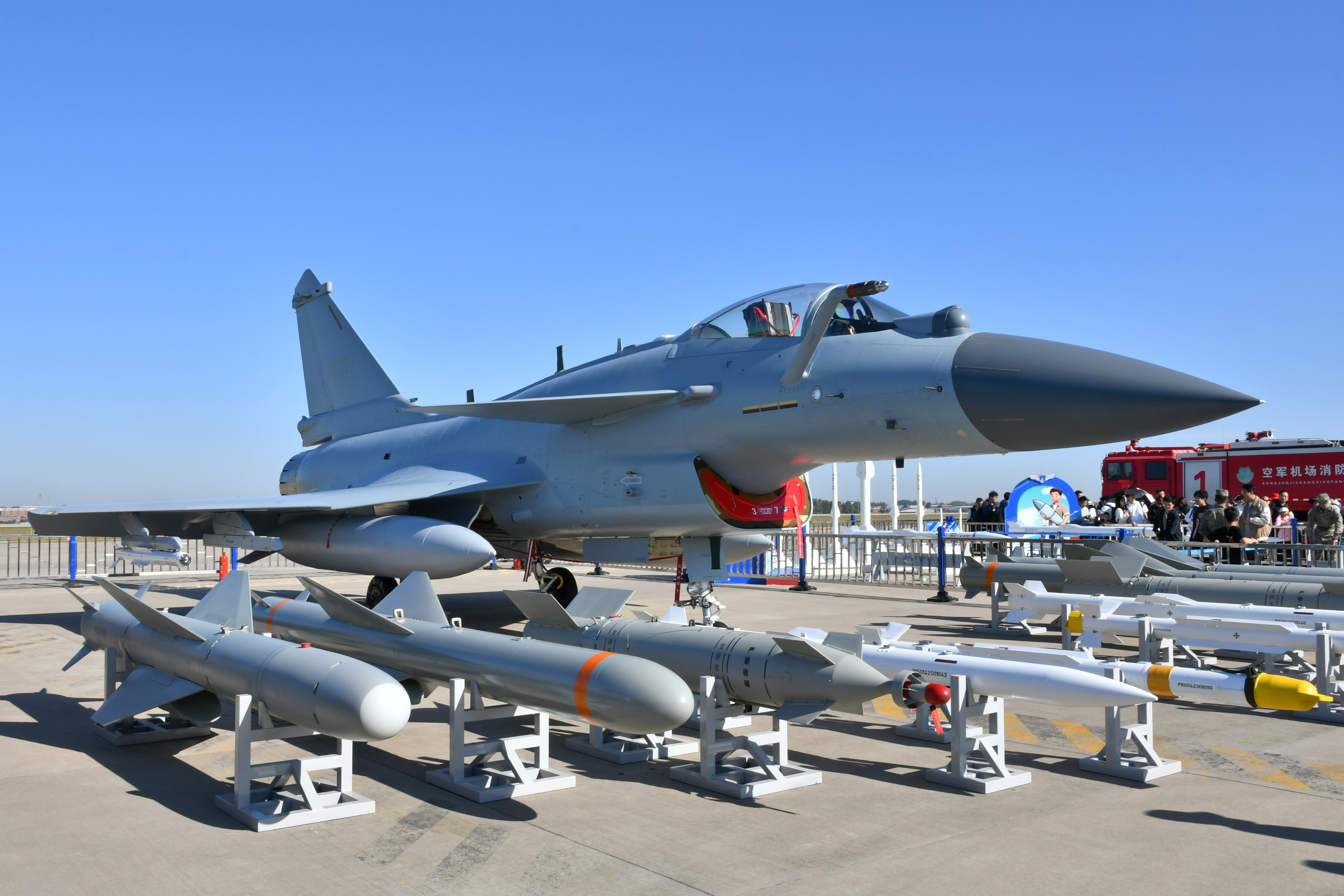
Chinese PLAAF Chengdu J-10C multirole-fighter displayed with different types of armaments

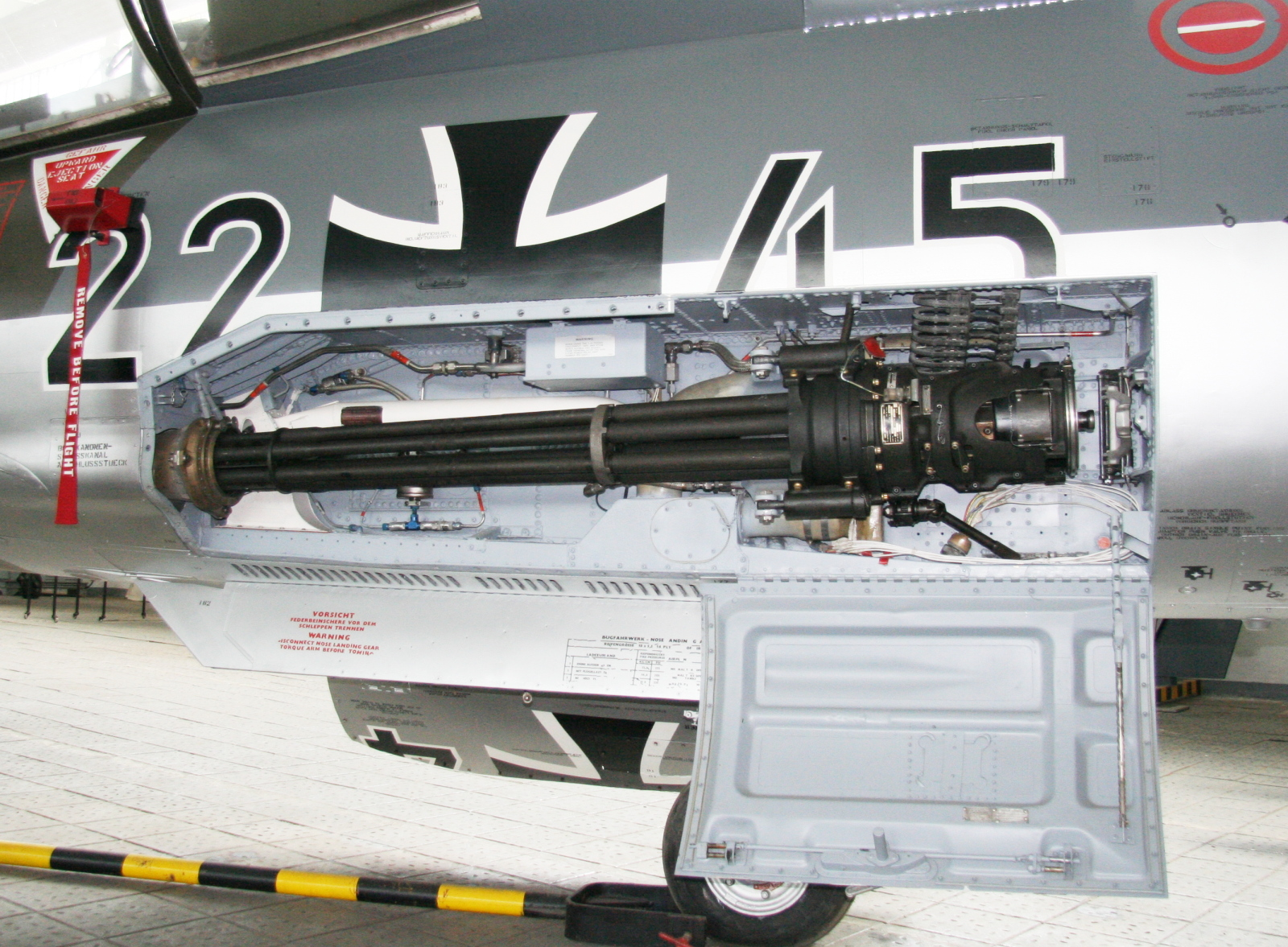
M61 20 mm gun installation on West German Lockheed F-104G Starfighter

Fighters were typically armed with guns only for air to air combat up through the late 1950s, though unguided rockets for mostly air to ground use and limited air to air use were deployed in WWII. From the late 1950s forward guided missiles came into use for air to air combat. Throughout this history fighters which by surprise or maneuver attain a good firing position have achieved the kill about one third to one half the time, no matter what weapons were carried. The only major historic exception to this has been the low effectiveness shown by guided missiles in the first one to two decades of their existence. From WWI to the present, fighter aircraft have featured machine guns and automatic cannons as weapons, and they are still considered as essential back-up weapons today. The power of air-to-air guns has increased greatly over time, and has kept them relevant in the guided missile era. In WWI two rifle (approximately 0.30) caliber machine guns was the typical armament, producing a weight of fire of about 0.4 kg (0.88 lb) per second. In WWII rifle caliber machine guns also remained common, though usually in larger numbers or supplemented with much heavier 0.50 caliber machine guns or cannons. The standard WWII American fighter armament of six 0.50-cal (12.7mm) machine guns fired a bullet weight of approximately 3.7 kg/sec (8.1 lbs/sec), at a muzzle velocity of 856 m/s (2,810 ft/s). British and German aircraft tended to use a mix of machine guns and autocannon, the latter firing explosive projectiles. Later British fighters were exclusively cannon-armed, the US were not able to produce a reliable cannon in high numbers and most fighters remained equipped only with heavy machine guns despite the US Navy pressing for a change to 20 mm.

Post war 20–30 mm revolver cannon and rotary cannon were introduced. The modern M61 Vulcan 20mm rotary cannon that is standard on current American fighters fires a projectile weight of about 10 kg/s (22 lb/s), nearly three times that of six 0.50-cal machine guns, with higher velocity of 1,052 m/s (3450 ft/s) supporting a flatter trajectory, and with exploding projectiles. Modern fighter gun systems also feature ranging radar and lead computing electronic gun sights to ease the problem of aim point to compensate for projectile drop and time of flight (target lead) in the complex three dimensional maneuvering of air-to-air combat. However, getting in position to use the guns is still a challenge. The range of guns is longer than in the past but still quite limited compared to missiles, with modern gun systems having a maximum effective range of approximately 1,000 meters. High probability of kill also requires firing to usually occur from the rear hemisphere of the target. Despite these limits, when pilots are well trained in air-to-air gunnery and these conditions are satisfied, gun systems are tactically effective and highly cost efficient. The cost of a gun firing pass is far less than firing a missile, (Note: Accurate data on modern gun pass cost is difficult to acquire, but during the Korean War was approximately $120. In 1970 a heat seeking missile shot was approximately $7000, and a radar guided missile shot about $40,000. (Stevenson, "The Pentagon Paradox", p.125).) and the projectiles are not subject to the thermal and electronic countermeasures than can sometimes defeat missiles. When the enemy can be approached to within gun range, the lethality of guns is approximately a 25% to 50% chance of "kill per firing pass".

The range limitations of guns, and the desire to overcome large variations in fighter pilot skill and thus achieve higher force effectiveness, led to the development of the guided air-to-air missile. There are two main variations, heat-seeking (infrared homing), and radar guided. Radar missiles are typically several times heavier and more expensive than heat-seekers, but with longer range, greater destructive power, and ability to track through clouds.

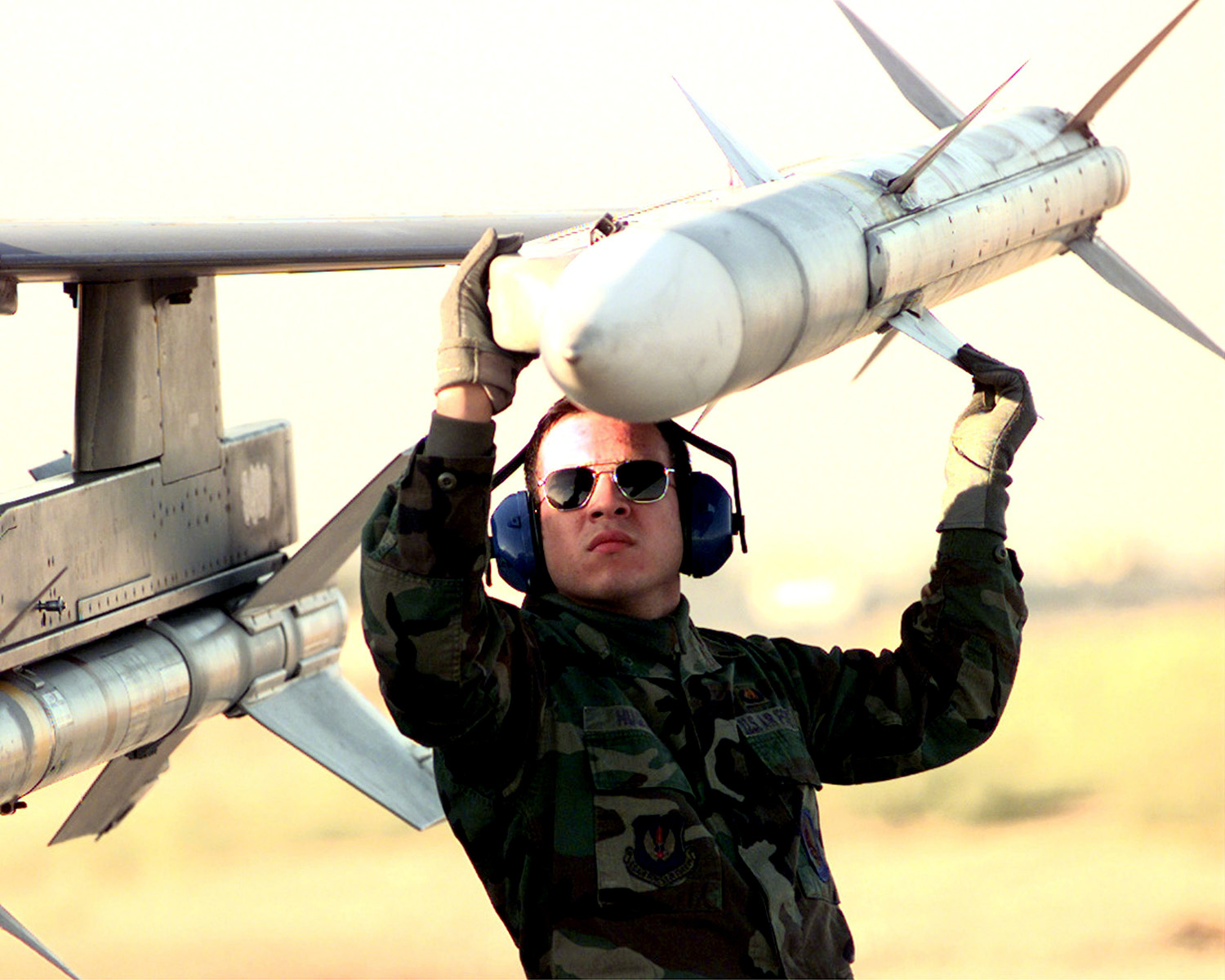
AIM-9 Sidewinder (underwing pylon) and AIM-120 AMRAAM (wingtip) carried by lightweight F-16 fighter

The highly successful AIM-9 Sidewinder heat-seeking (infrared homing) short-range missile was developed by the United States Navy in the 1950s. These small missiles are easily carried by lighter fighters, and provide effective ranges of approximately 10 to 35 kilometres (6 to 20 mi). Beginning with the AIM-9L in 1977, subsequent versions of Sidewinder have added all-aspect capability, the ability to use the lower heat of air to skin friction on the target aircraft to track from the front and sides. The latest (2003 service entry) AIM-9X also features "off-boresight" and "lock on after launch" capabilities, which allow the pilot to make a quick launch of a missile to track a target anywhere within the pilot's vision. The AIM-9X development cost was U.S. $3 billion in mid to late 1990s dollars, and 2015 per unit procurement cost is $0.6 million each. The missile weighs 85.3 kg (188 lbs), and has a maximum range of 35 km (22 miles) at higher altitudes. Like most air-to-air missiles, lower altitude range can be as limited as only about one third of maximum due to higher drag and less ability to coast downward.

The effectiveness of infrared homing missiles was only 7% early in the Vietnam War, but improved to approximately 15%–40% over the course of the war. The AIM-4 Falcon used by the USAF had kill rates of approximately 7% and was considered a failure. The AIM-9B Sidewinder introduced later achieved 15% kill rates, and the further improved AIM-9D and J models reached 19%. The AIM-9G used in the last year of the Vietnam air war achieved 40%. Israel used almost totally guns in the 1967 Six-Day War, achieving 60 kills and 10 losses. However, Israel made much more use of steadily improving heat-seeking missiles in the 1973 Yom Kippur War. In this extensive conflict Israel scored 171 of 261 total kills with heat-seeking missiles (65.5%), 5 kills with radar guided missiles (1.9%), and 85 kills with guns (32.6%). The AIM-9L Sidewinder scored 19 kills out of 26 fired missiles (73%) in the 1982 Falklands War. But, in a conflict against opponents using thermal countermeasures, the United States only scored 11 kills out of 48 fired (Pk = 23%) with the follow-on AIM-9M in the 1991 Gulf War.

Radar guided missiles fall into two main missile guidance types. In the historically more common semi-active radar homing case the missile homes in on radar signals transmitted from launching aircraft and reflected from the target. This has the disadvantage that the firing aircraft must maintain radar lock on the target and is thus less free to maneuver and more vulnerable to attack. A widely deployed missile of this type was the AIM-7 Sparrow, which entered service in 1954 and was produced in improving versions until 1997. In more advanced active radar homing the missile is guided to the vicinity of the target by internal data on its projected position, and then "goes active" with an internally carried small radar system to conduct terminal guidance to the target. This eliminates the requirement for the firing aircraft to maintain radar lock, and thus greatly reduces risk. A prominent example is the AIM-120 AMRAAM, which was first fielded in 1991 as the AIM-7 replacement, and which has no firm retirement date as of 2016. The current AIM-120D version has a maximum high altitude range of greater than 160 km (100 mi), and cost approximately $2.4 million each (2016). As is typical with most other missiles, range at lower altitude may be as little as one third that of high altitude.

In the Vietnam air war radar missile kill reliability was approximately 10% at shorter ranges, and even worse at longer ranges due to reduced radar return and greater time for the target aircraft to detect the incoming missile and take evasive action. At one point in the Vietnam war, the U.S. Navy fired 50 AIM-7 Sparrow radar guided missiles in a row without a hit. Between 1958 and 1982 in five wars there were 2,014 combined heat-seeking and radar guided missile firings by fighter pilots engaged in air-to-air combat, achieving 528 kills, of which 76 were radar missile kills, for a combined effectiveness of 26%. However, only 4 of the 76 radar missile kills were in the beyond-visual-range mode intended to be the strength of radar guided missiles. The United States invested over $10 billion in air-to-air radar missile technology from the 1950s to the early 1970s. Amortized over actual kills achieved by the U.S. and its allies, each radar guided missile kill thus cost over $130 million. The defeated enemy aircraft were for the most part older MiG-17s, −19s, and −21s, with new cost of $0.3 million to $3 million each. Thus, the radar missile investment over that period far exceeded the value of enemy aircraft destroyed, and furthermore had very little of the intended BVR effectiveness.

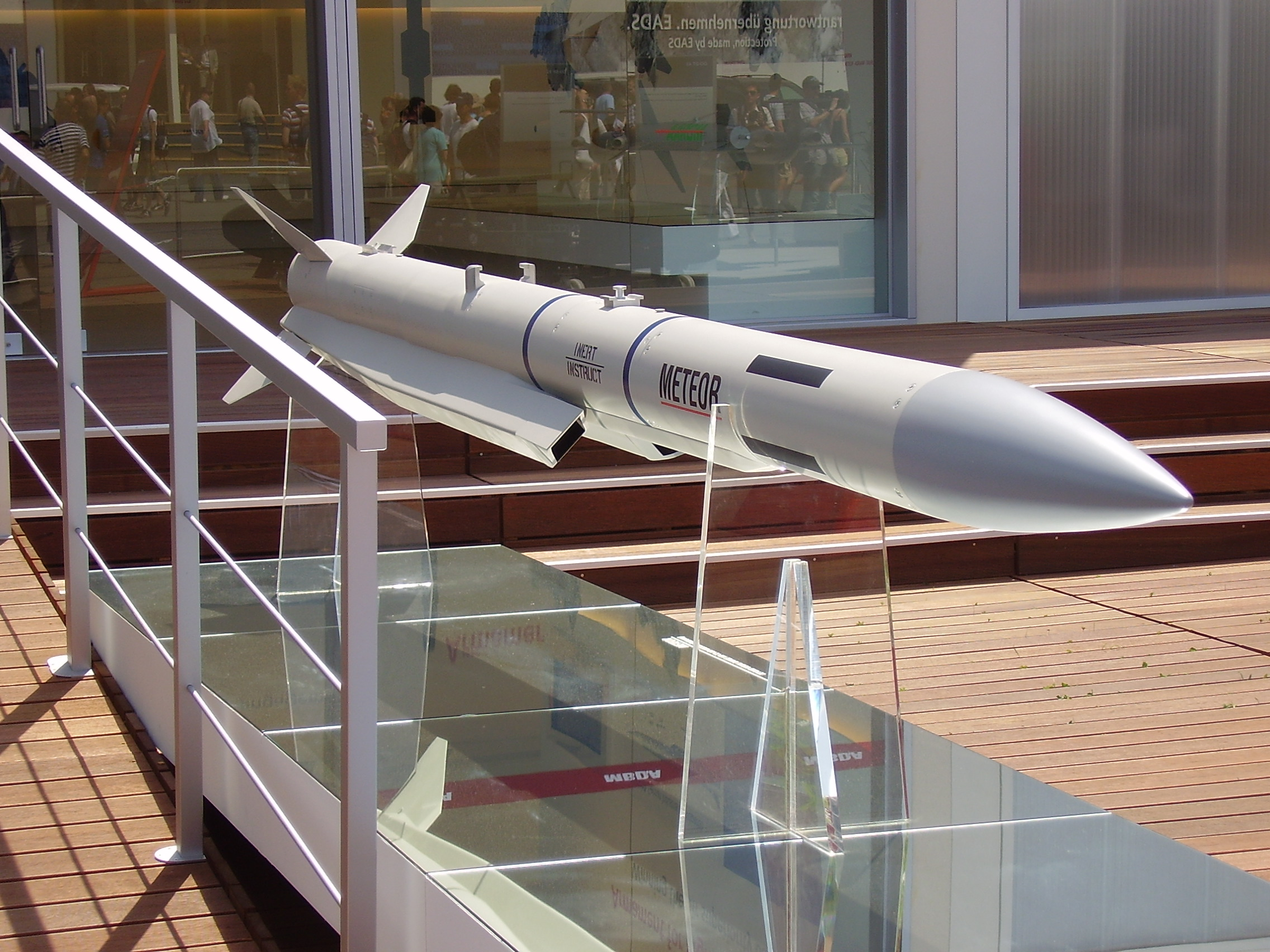
An MBDA Meteor, an ARH BVR AAM used on the Eurofighter Typhoon, Saab JAS 39 Gripen, Lockheed Martin F-35, and Dassault Rafale

However, continuing heavy development investment and rapidly advancing electronic technology led to significant improvement in radar missile reliabilities from the late 1970s onward. Radar guided missiles achieved 75% Pk (9 kills out of 12 shots) in operations in the Gulf War in 1991. The percentage of kills achieved by radar guided missiles also surpassed 50% of total kills for the first time by 1991. Since 1991, 20 of 61 kills worldwide have been beyond-visual-range using radar missiles. Discounting an accidental friendly fire kill, in operational use the AIM-120D (the current main American radar guided missile) has achieved 9 kills out of 16 shots for a 56% Pk. Six of these kills were BVR, out of 13 shots, for a 46% BVR Pk. Though all these kills were against less capable opponents who were not equipped with operating radar, electronic countermeasures, or a comparable weapon themselves, the BVR Pk was a significant improvement from earlier eras. However, a current concern is electronic countermeasures to radar missiles, which are thought to be reducing the effectiveness of the AIM-120D. Some experts believe that as of 2016 the European Meteor missile, the Russian R-37M, and the Chinese PL-15 are more resistant to countermeasures and more effective than the AIM-120D.

Now that higher reliabilities have been achieved, both types of missiles allow the fighter pilot to often avoid the risk of the short-range dogfight, where only the more experienced and skilled fighter pilots tend to prevail, and where even the finest fighter pilot can simply get unlucky. Taking maximum advantage of complicated missile parameters in both attack and defense against competent opponents does take considerable experience and skill, but against surprised opponents lacking comparable capability and countermeasures, air-to-air missile warfare is relatively simple. By partially automating air-to-air combat and reducing reliance on gun kills mostly achieved by only a small expert fraction of fighter pilots, air-to-air missiles now serve as highly effective force multipliers.

== See also ==
- List of fighter aircraft
- List of United States fighter aircraft
- Warbird
- Unmanned fighter jet
