= Robey-Peters Gun-Carrier =

Gun-Carrier
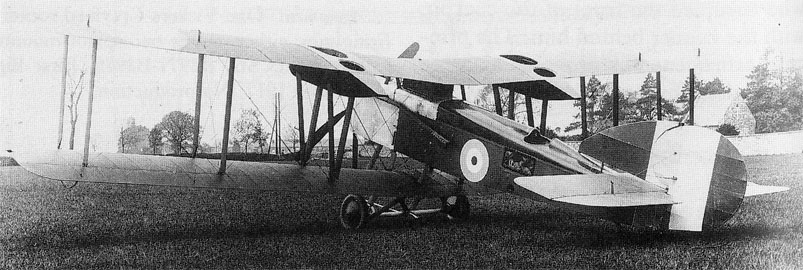

General information
- Type: Armed tractor biplane
- National origin: United Kingdom
- Manufacturer: Robey & Company Limited
- Primary user: Royal Naval Air Service
- Number built: 1

History
- First flight: May 1917

The Robey-Peters Gun-Carrier was a British three-seater armed tractor biplane designed and built by Robey & Company Limited at Bracebridge Heath, Lincoln for the Royal Naval Air Service (RNAS).

The gun-carrier was a single-engined three-bay biplane powered by a 250 hp (186 kW) Rolls-Royce engine. The Gun-Carrier had a gondola on each of the upper wings to carry a Davis gun (a form of recoilless rifle) and a gunner, while the pilot sat alone in a cockpit in the rear fuselage, just forward of the aircraft's tail. He was provided with windows in the sides of the cockpit to improve the extremely poor view caused by the cockpit's location. Two were ordered for the RNAS in May 1916 but the first aircraft (serial number 9498) crashed on its maiden flight from Bracebridge Heath in May 1917. The second aircraft was not completed and no others were built.

== Operators ==
United Kingdom

- Royal Naval Air Service, two ordered but only one built.

== Specifications ==
Data from

General characteristics

- Crew: 3 (pilot and two air-gunners)
- Length: 29 ft 6 in (8.99 m)
- Wingspan: 56 ft 6 in (16.62 m)
- Powerplant: 1 × Rolls-Royce Eagle piston engine , 250 hp (186 kW)

Armament

- provision for 2× 2-pdr Davis guns (not fitted)

== See also ==
Aircraft of comparable role, configuration, and era

- Armstrong Whitworth F.K.6
- Naval Aircraft Factory N-1
- Sopwith L.R.T.Tr.
- Vickers F.B.11
- Supermarine Nighthawk

Related lists

- List of aircraft of the Royal Naval Air Service
