= Strategic fighter =

Military fighter aircraft designed particularly for long-range combat missions

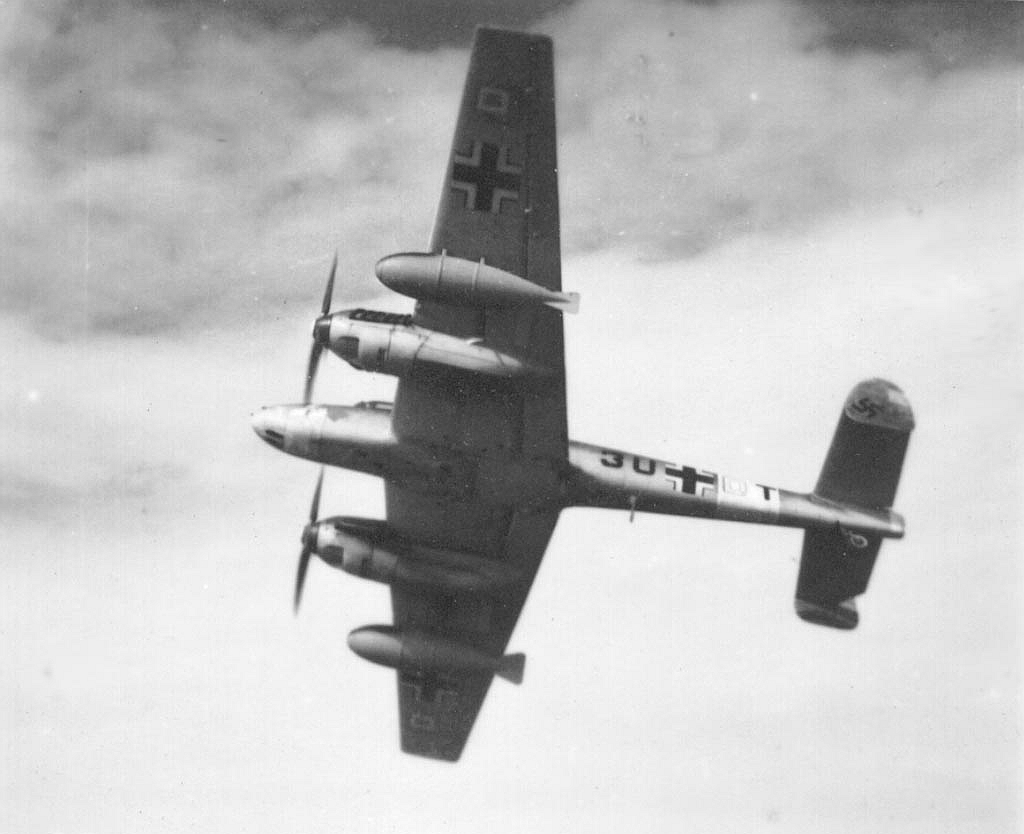
A Messerschmitt Bf 110 with range-extending drop tanks

A strategic fighter is a fast, well-armed and long-range fighter aircraft, capable of fulfilling roles such as that of an escort fighter protecting bombers, a penetration fighter carrying out offensive sorties of its own far into enemy territory, and of maintaining standing combat air patrols at significant distance from its home base.

Originally conceived of as a heavy fighter, as technologies developed giving lighter and more maneuverable types longer range, the focus of strategic fighter design shifted to include these types.

== Roles ==
The strategic fighter is a class of aircraft, originally conceived as a fast, well-armed and long-range fighter aircraft, capable of fulfilling a variety of roles.

Bombers are vulnerable due to their low speed and poor maneuvrability. The escort fighter was developed to come between the bombers and enemy attackers as a protective shield. The primary requirement was for long range, with several heavy fighters designed for the role during World War II. However, they too proved unwieldy and vulnerable, so as the war progressed techniques such as drop tanks were developed to extend the range of more nimble conventional fighters.

The penetration fighter is typically also fitted for the ground-attack role, and so is able to defend itself while conducting attack sorties.

Standing patrols are mounted in both peace and wartime to monitor for and intercept potentially hostile aircraft. The modern American defensive patrol is known as combat air patrol (CAP).

== History ==
=== Birth of a concept: 1914–1933 ===
The origins of the strategic fighter concept may be traced back to the German Kampfflugzeug (battle aircraft) of World War I. The Germans later came to refer to it as a Zerstörer (destroyer), and the Dutch as a Jachtkruiser (hunter cruiser). However, in the years prior to World War II, none proved successful. Although not designed for the strategic role, British fighters flew from one of the first aircraft carriers in 1918 to wreak devastating damage on German Zeppelin sheds, thus becoming an early example of the strategic fighter role.

=== The lessons of war: 1934–1945 ===
From 1934 several countries developed very similar sleek twin-engined monoplanes of slender form and all-metal construction. Of the French Potez 63, Polish PZL.38 Wilk and German Messerschmitt Bf 110 Kampfzerstörer (battle destroyer). PZL built only prototypes while the French and German types became the first strategic fighters to enter large-scale production. Although impressive by the standards of the day when the Bf 110 first flew in 1936, by the time of the Battle of Britain it was outclassed by contemporary interceptors the Hawker Hurricane and Supermarine Spitfire and proved relatively ineffectual as a bomber escort. American attempts to deploy long-range escort fighters such as the Lockheed P-38 Lightning were also partially successful, due to the limited manoeuvrability of such large aircraft in comparison to single-engined fighters such as the Focke-Wulf Fw 190 in Europe and Mitsubishi A6M Zero in the Pacific theatre. All these large, twin-engine types are also sometimes regarded as heavy fighters.

The situation changed with the introduction of drop tanks, which greatly extended the range of the significantly smaller and lighter North American P-51 Mustang fighter, leading some authorities to describe it as America's first successful strategic fighter. The USA employed three fighter types in their strategic fighter campaign over Berlin in the later half of the war. The P-38 was plagued by engine problems and its twin booms were easily recognisable in the air, rendering it vulnerable to surprise attack by the German fighters, while the Republic P-47 Thunderbolt had to release its drop tanks before combat, making its long-range value questionable. Although the P-51 got off to an unreliable start, it became the mainstay of the campaign and an outstanding success. Nevertheless all three types made significant contributions, leading General Kepner to declare in the closing stages that, "If it can be said that the P-38 struck the Luftwaffe in its vitals and the P-51s are giving it the coup de grace, it was the Thunderbolt that broke its back."

=== The jet age: 1946–present ===
During the cold war period, the US Strategic Air Command (SAC) created several strategic fighter squadrons, organised into strategic fighter wings, primarily for escort fighter and fighter-reconnaissance duties. The wings were initially equipped with the Republic F-84F Thunderstreak and the one strategic fighter reconnaissance wing with the RF-84F. However any fighter which could be developed soon enough and with sufficient endurance to accompany the Boeing B-47 Stratojet strategic bomber would be as big as its charge. With the advent of the more capable Boeing B-52 Stratofortress, in the first half of 1957 the strategic fighter wings were either disbanded or transferred to Tactical Air Command (TAC).

Meanwhile the McDonnell F-101 Voodoo had been under development as a deep penetration escort fighter. Although it came too late to serve with SAC, it was one of the first fighters designed to be capable of supersonic flight and was modified as a long-range interceptor serving with TAC. It went on to enjoy a long service life in this and related roles.
