= Intruder (air combat) =

Military aircraft sent to disrupt enemies deep behind front lines

An intruder is a military aircraft and its crew that is tasked with penetrating deep into enemy air space, to disrupt operations. Intruders are usually fighters, attackers or light bombers.

The intruder concept dates from World War II, the first radar-equipped night and all-weather fighters were able to take advantage of the cover provided by night-time and meteorological conditions.

Intruder crews attack enemy fighters, airfields, radar and other infrastructure; stage diversionary attacks; and escort bombers. Intruders often loiter in the vicinity of enemy airbases to attack aircraft as they take off or land.

The technique was first used in World War II. Starting in July 1940, small numbers of German fast bombers would merge into streams of Royal Air Force bombers returning from night missions over Europe. Once past the Chain Home radars, where they appeared to be returning bombers, they were free to attack RAF air bases. This often took the form of dropping light bombs, sometimes Butterfly Bombs, and then strafing aircraft. Early operations were not very successful, but by 1941 they had claimed 125 aircraft destroyed. However, these missions were risky; during this same period, they lost 55 of their intruder aircraft.

The RAF eventually took up the same concept, using the Hawker Hurricane Mk IIc as a makeshift intruder in various theatres. One of the first aircraft modified as a specialised intruder was the Douglas Havoc I. From late 1943, Bristol Beaufighters and de Havilland Mosquito intruders patrolled over occupied Europe, using Serrate radar detectors to hunt German night fighters.

In the post-war era, the term fell from use and was at times synonymous with the interdictor concept. The Grumman A-6C Intruder was an interdictor.

== See also ==
- Operation Whitebait, a notable use of the intruder tactic
