= Rex Wailes =

English engineer and historian (1901–1986)

- Born: Reginald Wailes; 6 March 1901; Hadley Wood, Middlesex, England
- Died: 7 January 1986 (aged 84); Beaconsfield, Buckinghamshire, England
- Education: Oundle School
- Occupation: Mechanical engineer
- Employer(s): Robey & Co; George Wailes & Co.
- Known for: Building preservation,

Reginald "Rex" Wailes OBE, FSA, F I Mech E (6 March 1901 – 7 January 1986) was an English engineer and historian who published widely on aspects of engineering history and industrial archaeology, particularly on windmills and watermills.

Wailes was born at Hadley Wood on 6 March 1901, the son of Reginald and Florence Wailes; his father was a mechanical engineer. He was educated at Oundle School before becoming an engineering apprentice at Robey's of Lincoln. In 1924 following his apprenticeship he joined the family firm of George Wailes & Company.

In 1923, while serving his apprenticeship with Robey & Co, an engineering firm in Lincoln, he was asked by the then president of the Newcomen Society to record windmills in Lincolnshire. At the time English windmills were rapidly falling into disuse and being demolished, and it was felt that some attempt should be made to record this vanishing aspect of the English countryside. In 1929 he was appointed technical adviser to the newly formed Windmill Section (now the Mills Section) of the Society for the Protection of Ancient Buildings. In this post he visited numerous mills in England and developed a reputation as the leading British authority on them, presenting more than thirty papers to the Newcomen Society on mill-related subjects. He was also invited to report on mills overseas, notably in the United States, presenting a paper on the windmills of Long Island for the Society for the Preservation of New England Antiquities in 1935. He was also the consultant for the construction of Robertson's post mill at Colonial Williamsburg in the 1950s.

Books followed, the most notable of which were Windmills in England (1948) and The English Windmill (1954), the latter in particular being considered the classic work on the subject.

From 1963 to 1971 he was the lead consultant to the Industrial Monuments Survey then being undertaken by the Ministry of Works in an effort to identify historic industrial sites which were worthy of preservation under the Town and Country Planning Acts. In 1965 he represented United Kingdom at the first International Symposium of Molinology in Portugal. In the 1974 New Year Honours he was appointed an Officer of the Order of the British Empire (OBE) for services to industrial archaeology.

He served as president of the Newcomen Society, 1953 to 1955, and was elected as an honorary member in 1977.
