= Escort fighter =

Aircraft designed to protect other aircraft

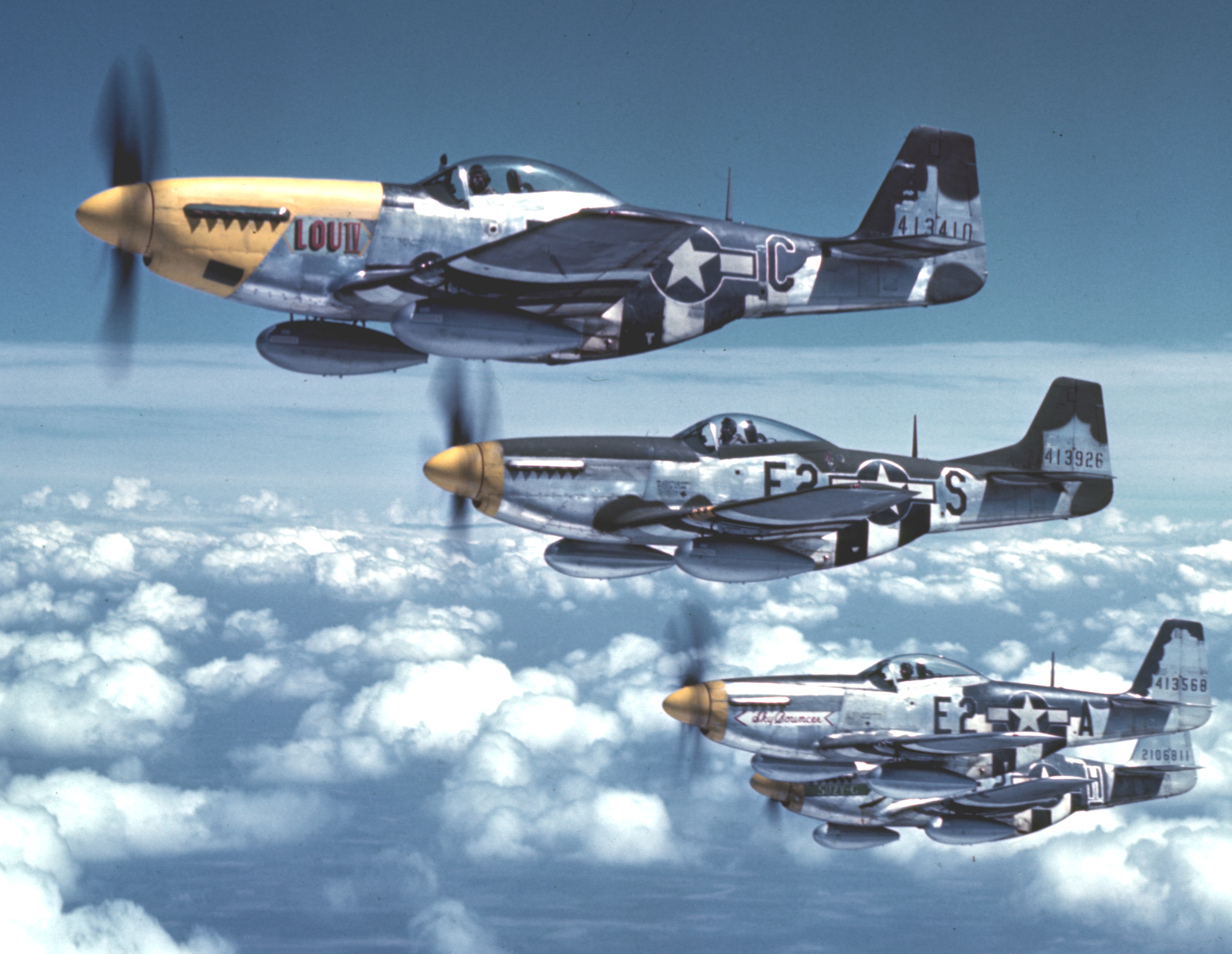
The North American P-51 Mustang is one of the best-known escort fighters of World War II.

The escort fighter was a concept for a fighter aircraft designed to escort bombers to and from their targets. An escort fighter needed range long enough to reach the target, loiter over it for the duration of the raid to defend the bombers, and return.

A number of twin-engined heavy fighters with high fuel capacity were designed for escort duties prior to the outbreak of World War II. Such heavy fighters largely failed in their intended escort role during the war, as they were commonly outmaneuvered by more agile single-engined fighters. As the war progressed, longer-range fighter designs and the use of drop tanks allowed single-engined fighters to perform escort duties. In the post-war era the introduction of jet engines and their inherent short range made escort fighters very difficult to build. The related concept of a penetration fighter emerged briefly in the 1950s and again in the 1960s, but did not result in any production aircraft. Parasite fighters—small aircraft designed to be carried by a specialized bomber—were seen as a possible solution to the limited ranges of most traditional escort fighters. First experimented with in WWI, the U.S.-designed XF-85 Goblin would emerge as the last dedicated parasite fighter design and was abandoned in 1949 due to technical issues as well as the advent of practical aerial refueling.

The escort role has been diminished as modern air combat doctrine places a heavy emphasis on the idea of air superiority, and its importance in the ability of an air force to carry out effective operations. Air superiority is defined as a situation in which an air force dominates an airspace to such a degree as to be able to carry out any operations with no interference from enemy air combatants. Fighting an opponent with air superiority in a given battlespace is much harder, as any offensive or defensive tactics are likely to be overwhelmed.

== World War I and interwar period ==
The first major strategic bombing campaigns were carried out during World War I. Initially using Zeppelins, and later by large bomber aircraft such as the Gotha G.IV and Handley Page Type O, these raids were increasingly countered by fighter aircraft. These fighters benefitted substantially from an inherent asymmetry; the attacking aircraft had to fly long distances to reach its target and thus had to be large enough to carry the required fuel load, while the defending fighters were flying only a short distance and therefore were able to be much lighter and have higher performance.

In early 1916, the British War Office drew up a specification for a multi-seat escort fighter intended to protect formations of bombers from German fighters. While the specification did not require high speed, a good field of fire for its guns was essential. Prototype aircraft were built – Armstrong Whitworth F.K.6, Sopwith L.R.T.Tr and Vickers F.B.11 – all three put gunners into nacelles to provide wide fields of fire. The development of effective synchronisation gear which meant smaller fighters could be equally effective led to the end of development of the designs.

As the fighters held the upper hand, raids were almost always carried out at night. During the inter-war era, this led to the creation of dedicated night bomber designs that concentrated on solving the problem of long-range navigation at night. During 1932, in the face of increasingly capable bomber aircraft, the British Prime Minister Stanley Baldwin surmised that interception efforts would inevitably not always succeed and that "the bomber will always get through". Furthermore, due to a lack of precision aiming capabilities, bombers were viewed as likely to attack urban environments in general; Baldwin noted that their primary purpose would be to "kill the enemy's women and children more rapidly than they killed yours".

This state of affairs was considered distasteful and there was some consideration given to methods to allow bombing during the day. Two ideas became popular. The schnellbomber was a very fast aircraft that would simply fly right past the slower fighters due to the extra power of their twin-engine designs. This was demonstrated with great effect at multiple air races during the early 1930s, where light twins easily outperformed fighters. However, this situation only existed for a short period until more powerful aircraft engines emerged in the mid-1930s and once again a single-engine fighter could catch a twin-engine bomber. The other idea was the escort fighter that would attempt to break up attacks by the defense before they could reach the bombers. To have the desired range, the aircraft had to carry a large fuel load, and at the time this demanded a twin-engine aircraft. Such a design would not be able to maneuver with the single-engine day fighters, so attention was given to outright performance.

== World War II ==
=== In Luftwaffe service ===
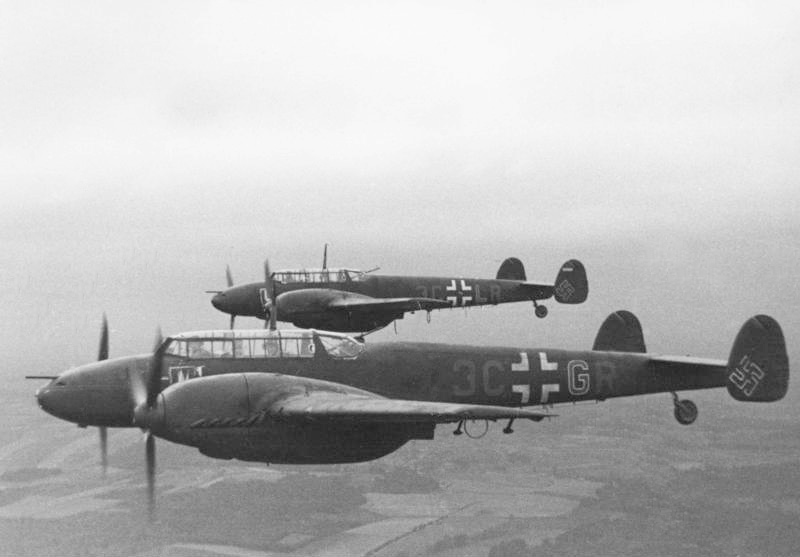
The Bf 110 was designed as an escort fighter but found more widespread use as a light bomber and later as a night fighter.

Luftwaffe strategy was based mostly on daytime tactical bombing and put significant effort into the escort fighter concept before the outbreak of World War II. One of the principal outcomes of this attention was the Messerschmitt Bf 110 heavy fighter, which was widely produced. At the time of its introduction, the Bf 110 had been among the fastest production aircraft ever built, but as had occurred with the schnellbomber designs, by the start of the conflict, its performance lead had been seriously eroded.

During the Battle of Britain, the Luftwaffe used both Messerschmitt Bf 109s and Bf 110s based in France as escort fighter-bombers. Although flying from relatively close airfields in France, the Bf 109 was operating at the extreme of its range and unable to remain for long with the bombers if it was to have fuel to return, while the Bf 110, specifically designed for the escort role, had inferior performance and was easily outperformed by the Royal Air Force's Supermarine Spitfires and Hawker Hurricanes. In those few situations where the German bombers were escorted only by Bf 110s, the RAF fighters could simply ignore them and attack the bombers almost unhindered. In engagements where the fighters opted to engage the BF 110s instead, a relatively high loss rate for the Bf 110s was typically incurred as a result.

In one famous example, a group of seventy-two Heinkel He 111's from Norway, escorted by Bf 110s, made an attack on Newcastle. The defending Hurricanes and Spitfires were able to pick their targets with complete impunity, eventually destroying eight He 111s and seven Bf 110s without loss. The raid was such a disaster that the Luftwaffe abandoned attacks from Norway and directed the remaining aircraft to France. From that point onwards, the Bf 110 was mostly withdrawn from the escort role, in part because so many had been lost that sufficient numbers could no longer be fielded in the short term; when it did return, it was largely used as a light bomber, and night fighter instead.

=== In RAF service ===
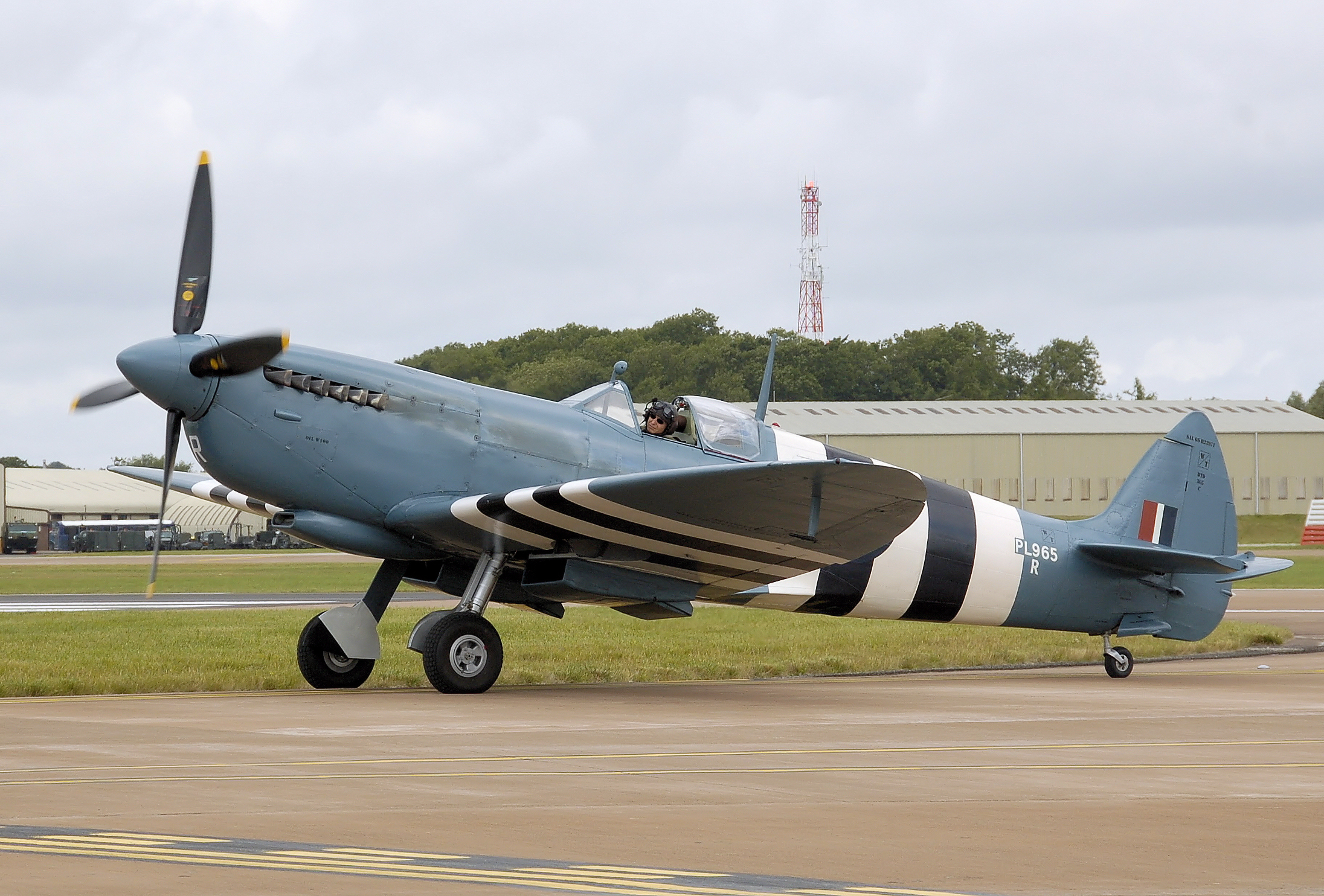
Although the photoreconnaissance versions of the Spitfire flew deep over Germany during daylight, the idea of deep escort was never seriously considered by the RAF.

In contrast to their German counterparts, the RAF long argued against the development of escorts. A key reason was largely organizational. In 1936 the former Air Defence of Great Britain had its duties split into RAF Fighter Command and RAF Bomber Command. Fighter Command felt that using their fighters as protection for bombing raids would draw on their own numbers. On 30 November 1936, Director of Staff Duties Sholto Douglas made this position formal, stating "the bombers should be able to look after themselves without the addition of an escort of fighters." Production allocation followed this rule, capping the number of fighters delivered to front-line use with the British Expeditionary Force and sending the rest to UK formations.

At the same time, the newly formed Bomber Command developed their plans with the assumption that there would be no escorts. This was due to a combination of factors. One was the belief that improved navigational technique would allow the night bomber force to attack point targets. Another was that immediately before the war, new and much larger aircraft like the Vickers Wellington were arriving that mounted heavy defensive armament. This convinced some in Bomber Command that daylight raids would not require escorts.

The concept of daytime raids quickly ended after the disastrous air battle of the Heligoland Bight, in which a force of 22 Wellingtons lost 12 aircraft to German fighters as they attacked warships in harbour. (Note: German losses were three Bf 109s, with four fighters (Bf 109 and BF 110) severely damaged and further eight lightly damaged.) For the rest of the war, the RAF was convinced night bombing was the only survivable strategy and this opinion was not seriously reconsidered. Both Fighter and Bomber command evolved doctrinal arguments against escorts, even after photoreconnaissance versions of the Spitfire were flying deep into Germany at ranges that would allow them to escort daytime bombing.

During the preparations for the Big Week offensive, the USAAF asked the RAF to consider how to carry out daytime bombing with Spitfire escorts. Fighter Command claimed this was impossible, making several highly questionable calculations to "prove" this. This led to two Spitfires being shipped to Wright-Patterson where many new fuel tanks were added without major effects on performance. Their now excellent range was demonstrated by flying them back across the Atlantic to England. In spite of this demonstration, Fighter Command was slow to consider such adaptations and was not until well after Pointblank was concluded that final sign-off was given, at which point they saw no need for such conversions.

=== In US Army Air Force service ===
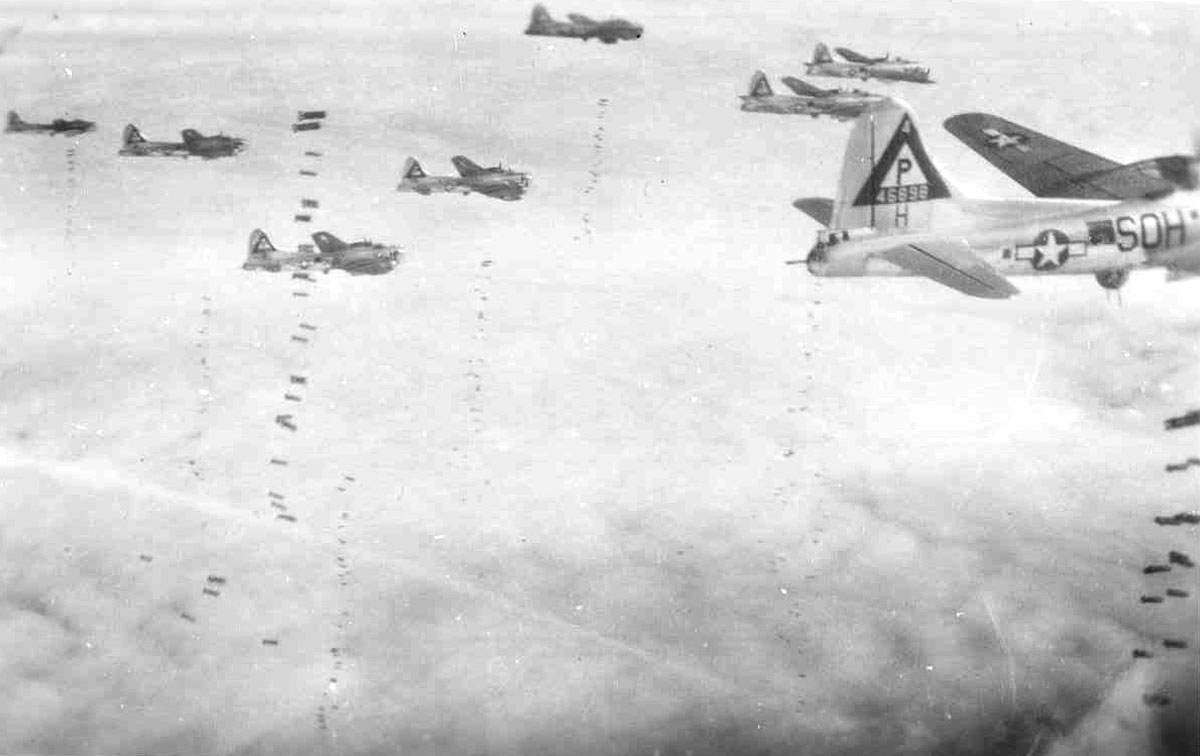
B-17 bombers in formation

The U.S. Army Air Forces' precision strategic bombing campaign against German industries was only possible during the day. At first, this was not seen as an issue; the Forces' Boeing B-17 Flying Fortress and Consolidated B-24 Liberator bombers were the most heavily armed aircraft of the time. Close formations of them were planned, creating a crossfire of .50 caliber machine-guns that would fend off the enemy with no need for a fighter escort. Some officials claimed that escort fighters were wholly impractical. The service remained convinced of this strategy in spite of continued warnings from the RAF that this would not be the case.

In the early stages of the US efforts, bombing runs often took place without escort fighters. German fighter pilots were scrambled to deal with these raids, and soon learned that it was much easier for them to take out formations which were unescorted as opposed to those who were escorted. As a result, fighters would attack bomber formations that were on long-range operations, as they would not have escorts with them. They quickly determined the point at which the fighters would be forced to turn around and massed their fighters just beyond that point.

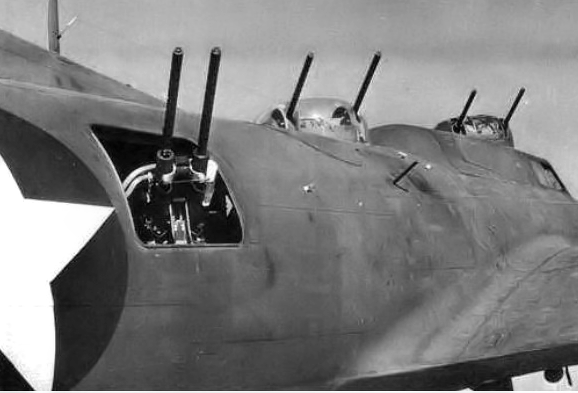
Close-up of the array of .50-caliber guns on the Boeing YB-40 Flying Fortress.

USAAF bomber losses gradually increased, and experimental "gunships" like the YB-40 did nothing of significance to reduce them. This culminated in the disastrous Second Raid on Schweinfurt on 14 October 1943, in which 26% of the attacking force was either destroyed or written off due to damage.

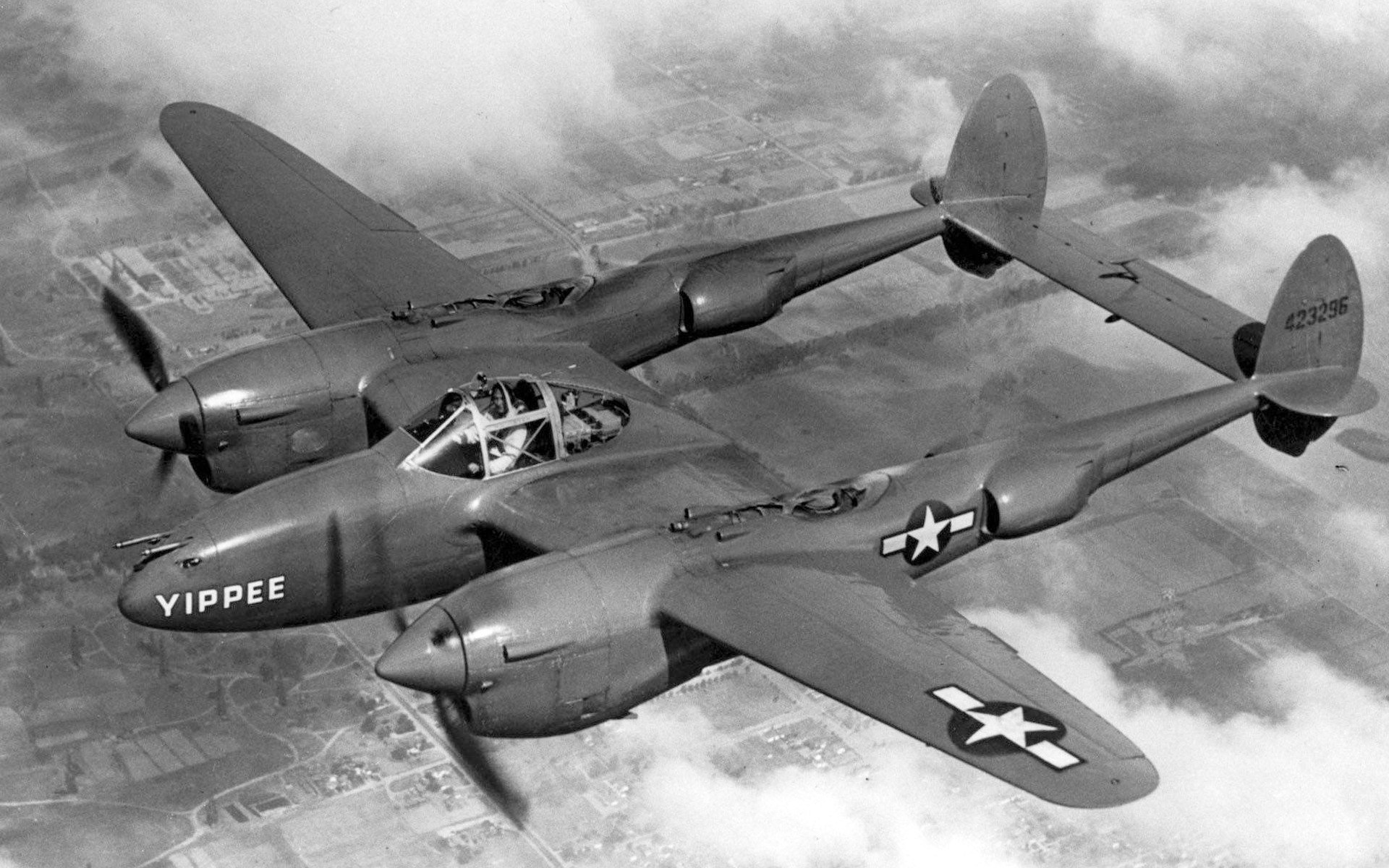
The Lockheed P-38 Lightning had far greater range than its early contemporaries.

This forced the United States Army Air Force to come to the conclusion that their B-17 bombers needed to do something to reduce losses, and that escorts had an appreciable benefit in reducing the rate of losses, particularly as the intensity of German interception efforts had grown substantially, to the point where unescorted bombing missions came to be discouraged. This realisation eventually led to the development of long range escort fighters. A series of unrelated developments had left the US in the position of being able to quickly address this need. Prior to their entry into the war, the USAAF fighter forces were interested in bomber destroyers and developed a series of cannon-armed aircraft, among which, the Lockheed P-38 Lightning was large enough to also have a large fuel capacity. Unlike earlier twin-engine designs like the Bf 110, the Lightning proved to be competitive with the German fighters it faced, permitting it to be easily adapted to the escort role through the use of drop tanks. On 3 March 1944, the 55th Fighter Group flew their P-38s over Berlin.

Further adaptations quickly followed. The Republic P-47 Thunderbolt mounted a powerful engine that allowed it to carry large loads. This made it suitable in the fighter-bomber role, as well as giving it the ability to carry large fuel tanks. Finally, the extremely high efficiency of the laminar-flow wing on the Merlin-powered North American P-51 Mustang gave it unparalleled range even on internal fuel, and with external tanks, it could cover most of Europe. Although not designed for the escort role, the P-51 remains the canonical example of the class.

== Cold War ==
The successes of the P-47N and P-51 gave the impression that the escort fighter was a concept worth continuing after the end of the war. The high fuel use of early jet engines made such aircraft difficult to design, and a number of experimental designs were tried that used mixed power, typically a turboprop and jet, but these failed to meet performance requirements. A new concept, the McDonnell XF-85 Goblin microfighter, planned to act as a parasite fighter for the Convair B-36 Peacemaker strategic bomber, was tested with a Boeing B-29 Superfortress and found to be utterly impossible to use operationally. The subsequent FICON project attempted a similar solution, docking jet fighters with heavy bombers via a trapeze mechanism or their wingtips.

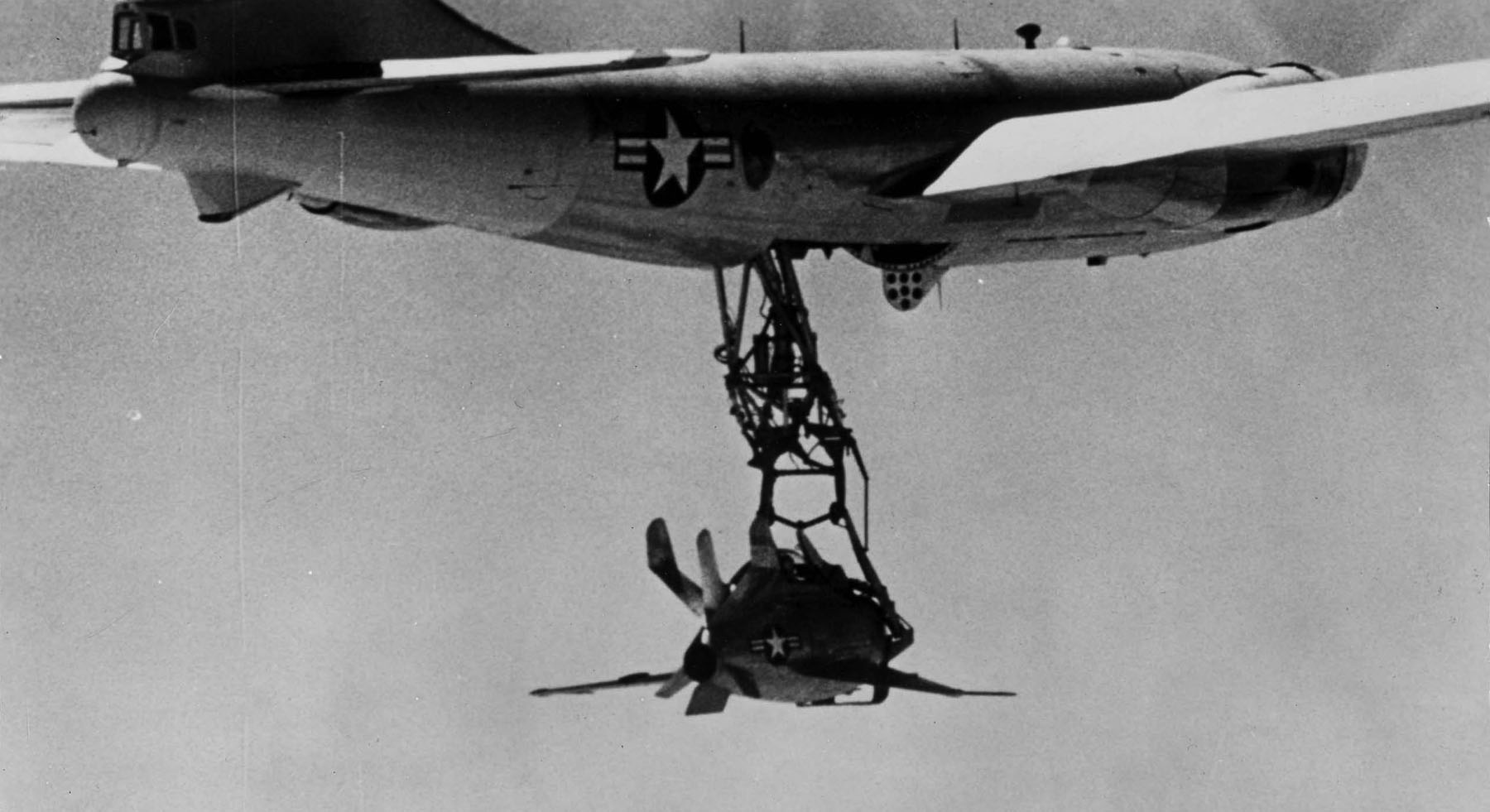
XF-85 suspended from an EB-29 via a trapeze

Whilst projects for dedicated escort fighters such as the XF-85 Goblin came to nothing, the advancement of technology and the nature of warfare of the wars being fought allowed the role of fighter escort to gradually merge with fighter types, so the term fell out of use. During the Korean War, the Lockheed F-80 Shooting Star and later the North American F-86 Sabre escorted B-29 heavy bombers and Republic F-84 Thunderjet strike fighters.

Although the North American XB-70 Valkyrie Mach 3 bomber, was intended to be immune to enemy attack due to its speed, North American Aviation briefly proposed the North American XF-108 Rapier interceptor for the escort role. In this case, the term "penetration fighter" was used, as the aircraft was not expected to actually escort the bombers, and was instead intended to fly into Soviet airspace well in advance of the bombers and attack the Soviet interceptors long before they could approach the bombers.

With the development of guided missiles, particularly surface-to-air missiles, plans for dedicated escort fighters designed to escort nuclear bombers gradually faded from the scene. Missile technology meant that interceptors would rarely engage bombers directly, if ever, and the escorts could do little against missiles. At the same time, the advancement of land and submarine-based ballistic missiles relegated bombers to a lower importance – they became just a single element of the nuclear triad in the US, and largely ignored entirely in the USSR. Furthermore, with the concept of mutually assured destruction high on the political agenda throughout the Cold War, a nuclear exchange became ever less likely, leaving existing fighter designs more than adequate for their protection in the wars being fought. In Vietnam for instance, McDonnell Douglas F-4 Phantom IIs and sometimes Vought F-8 Crusaders escorted the American bombers such as Boeing B-52 Stratofortresses, Republic F-105 Thunderchiefs and Douglas A-4 Skyhawks. In some cases the missions of F-4 were "mixed", when some F-4 were equipped with bombs, and some F-4 acted as escorts (similar cases occurred with F-8).

== Modern era ==
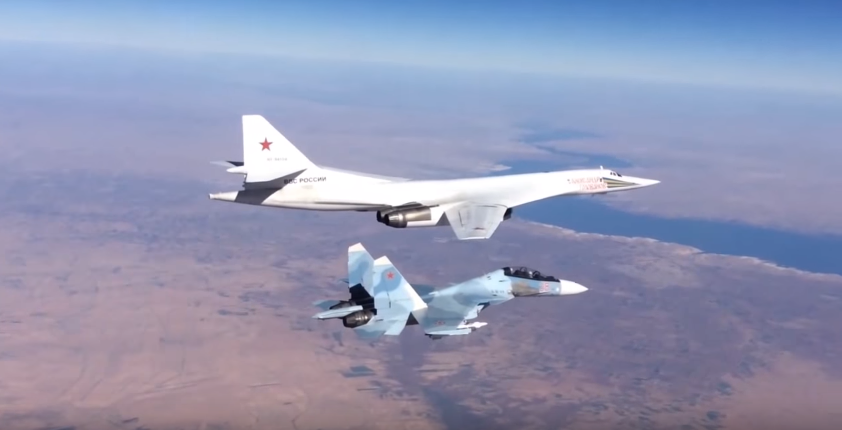
A Russian Air Force Tupolev Tu-160 being escorted by a air superiority/multirole Su-30SM jetfighter.

The advent of the air superiority fighter, such as the McDonnell Douglas F-15 Eagle, meant that high value assets like tankers, airborne early warning and control, command platforms, bombers and attack aircraft would be protected by air superiority fighters, sometimes flying far afield and ahead of them, engaging distant enemy air units, rather than by direct escorts staying in sight nearby.

The development of the multirole fighter, such as McDonnell Douglas F/A-18 Hornet, also decreased the need for escorts, as the aircraft on air strike mission became capable of effectively defending themselves.

During the 2010s, the US Air Force was in the early stages of developing a new fighter intended to operate as an escort for the next generation Northrop Grumman B-21 Raider strategic bomber.

== See also ==
- Aerial warfare
- Interceptor, the main adversary of an escort fighter
- Wild Weasel
