= Caudron C.21 =

General information
- Type: 4-seat touring aircraft
- National origin: France
- Manufacturer: Caudron
- Designer: Paul Deville
- Number built: 1

History
- First flight: late 1918 - early 1919
- Developed into: Caudron C.22

The Caudron C.21 was a French twin engine biplane built just after World War I, able to carry three passengers in an open cockpit.

== Design and development ==
The aircraft was designed in 1917 to meet a Service Technique de l'Aéronautique (French for "Aeronautical technology service") requirement for an aircraft in the Bn.2 (two-seat night bomber) class. The prototype first flew in November that year, but proved underpowered for its intended role, and development continued with the Caudron C.22 design instead.

After the war the design was completed as a four-seat passenger aircraft. This civilian version is sometimes known as the C.21bis.

It was a three bay biplane, with fabric covered, constant chord, unswept wings ending at angled tips. The upper wing, which carried the ailerons, had an 8% greater span and a smaller chord. There was no stagger, so the sets of parallel interplane struts were vertical; flying wires braced each bay. Pairs of V-form engine struts, supporting the two 60 kW (80 hp) Le Rhône 9C rotary engines above the lower wing, defined the inner two bays. There were short, parallel cabane struts from the upper fuselage.

The C.21's fuselage was almost flat sided, with a vertical knife edge at the short nose. It had an open cockpit starting in the extreme nose and seating the three passengers in tandem; the pilot's cockpit was under the trailing edge, with a deep cut-out for better upward vision. At the rear a straight edged, long and low fin carried a straight edged, balanced rudder that extended down to the keel. An angled tailplane mounted on top of the fuselage had elevators with a cut-out for rudder movement and it had a tailskid undercarriage, with pairs of mainwheels on axles attached to longitudinal bars fixed under the engines on N-form struts.

== Operational history ==
The date of the C.21's first flight is uncertain but it was before February 1919. On 10–11 February it gained publicity with four flights between Paris and Brussels, a distance of 310 km (193 mi) covered in about 140 minutes. They were flown by Chanteloup, accompanied by designer Deville, to retrieve the passengers from a Caudron C.23, modified into a passenger transport, which had broken a tailskid at Brussels. The C.21 was advertised in the Caudron catalogue at a price of FF 30,000. It seems only one example was built but its layout was repeated in Caudron's successively larger and more powerful C.22 and C.23 night bombers.

== Specifications ==
Data from Hauet (2001)

General characteristics

- Crew: One
- Capacity: Three passengers
- Length: 7.94 m (26 ft 1 in)
- Upper wingspan: 13.50 m (44 ft 3 in)
- Lower wingspan: 12.50 m (41 ft 0 in)
- Wing area: 39.9 m^{2} (429 sq ft)
- Empty weight: 915 kg (2,017 lb)
- Powerplant: 2 × Le Rhône 9C 9-cylinder air-cooled rotary, 60 kW (80 hp) each
- Propellers: 2-bladed

Performance

- Maximum speed: 140 km/h (87 mph, 76 kn) at 4,000 m (13,123 ft)
- Endurance: 4 hr
- Time to altitude: 22 min to 4,000 m (13,123 ft)
