= Penetration fighter =

Fighter aircraft designed to operate inside enemy airspace

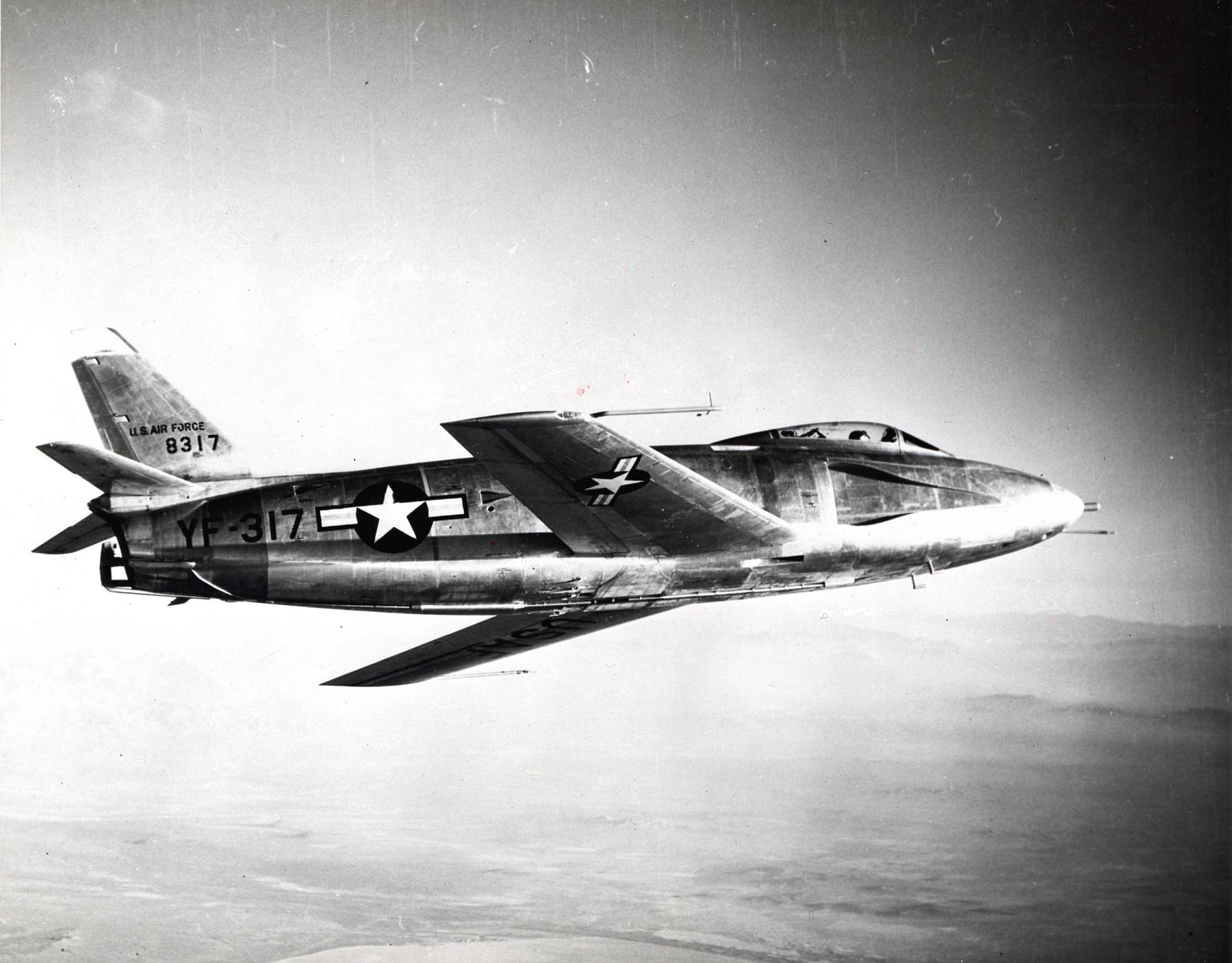
North American YF-93A 48-317

The term penetration fighter has been used to describe a long-range fighter aircraft designed to penetrate enemy air defences and attack defensive interceptors. The concept is similar to the escort fighter, but differs primarily in that the aircraft would not operate in close concert with bombers. Both types are sub-classes of the strategic fighter. The same general mission is also carried out by intruders, but these are generally night fighters or light bombers that do not have the air combat performance of this concept.

The presence of the North American P-51 Mustang above Germany allowed USAAF bombers to fly at will over the country, and is considered one of the turning points of the air war. In the post-war period, the development of jet-powered strategic bombers made this role difficult to fill; aircraft with performance to protect the bombers had very short range, and those with the range were propeller designs that could not keep up. The desire for a fighter that could penetrate enemy airspace along with the bombers led to several prototype designs in the early 1950s, including the McDonnell XF-88 Voodoo, Lockheed XF-90 and North American YF-93. In order to be competitive with existing interceptors, these had to be jet powered. The XF-88 was developed into the F-101 Voodoo supersonic penetration fighter-bomber.

The North American XF-108 Rapier project was for a long-range interceptor intended to launch from the continental United States and intercept Soviet bombers while still in the far Arctic. This long range meant that if they were launched from forward bases in Europe, Turkey or Alaska, the F-108 would be able to travel a fair distance over the USSR and help disrupt the defences for the following North American XB-70 bombers. The F-108 was ultimately cancelled in budget cuts.

== See also ==
- Penetrator, the bomber equivalent
