= Davis gun =

Davis Gun
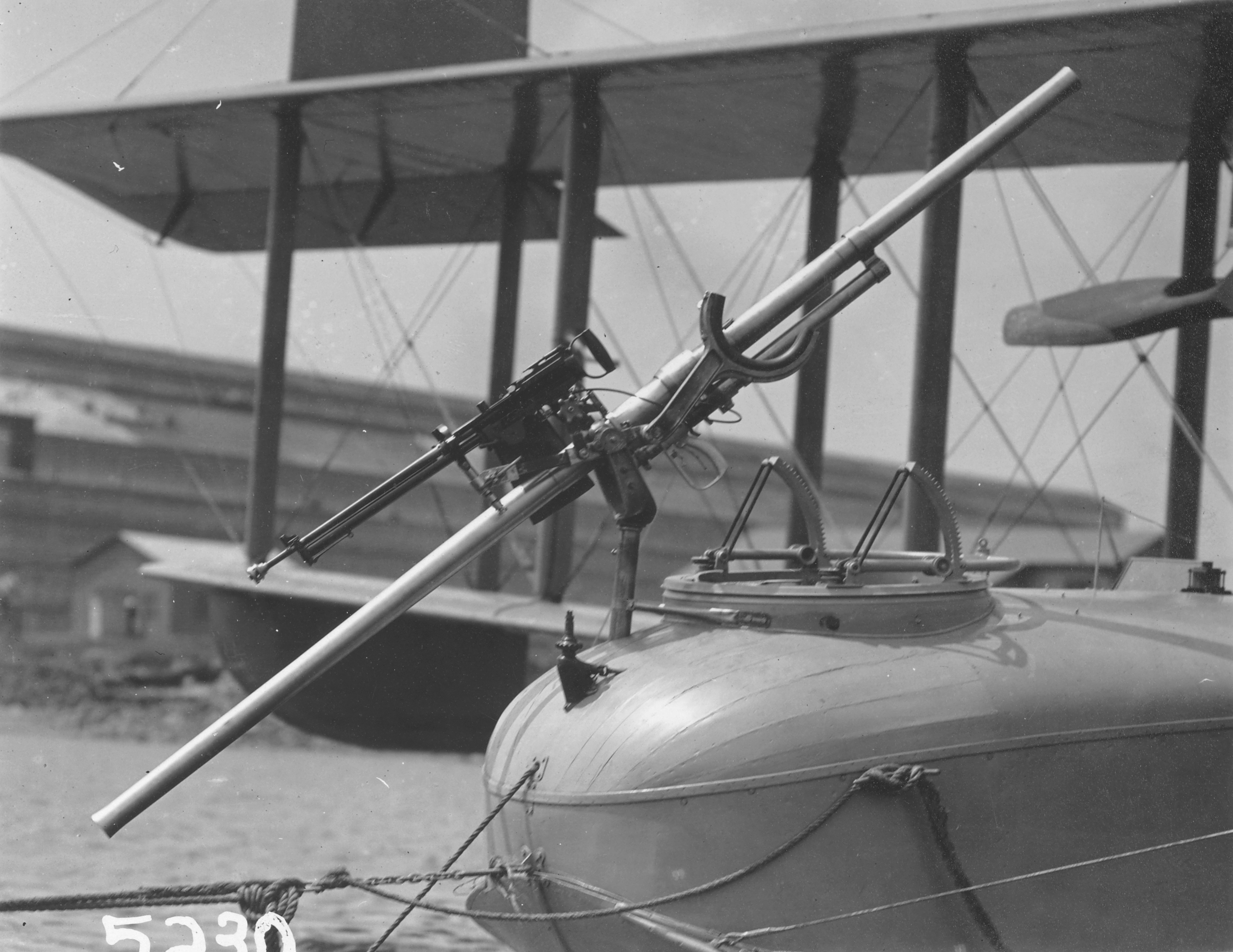
- Davis gun mounted on Curtiss F5L anti-submarine seaplane
- Type: Recoilless cannon
- Place of origin: United States

Service history
- Used by: Royal Naval Air Service
- Wars: World War I

Production history
- Designer: Cleland Davis
- Designed: 1912–1914

The Davis gun was the first true recoilless gun developed and taken into service. It was developed by Commander Cleland Davis of the United States Navy in 1910, just prior to World War I.

== Development ==
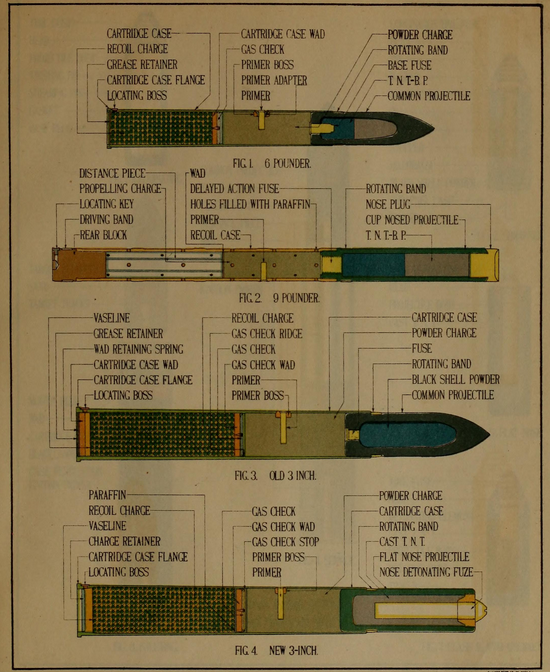
Different types of Davis-type ammunition

Davis' design connected two guns back to back, with the backwards-facing gun loaded with lead balls and grease of the same weight as the shell in the other gun, acting as a counter. His idea was used experimentally by the British and Americans as an anti-Zeppelin and anti-submarine weapon mounted on the British Handley Page O/100 and O/400 bombers and the American Curtiss Twin JN and Curtiss HS-2L and H-16 flying boats. The direct development of the gun ended with the end of World War I in November 1918, but the firing principle has been copied by later designs.

== Description ==
The gun was made in three sizes: 2-pounder, 6-pounder and 12-pounder; 1.57 in (40 mm), 2.45 in (62 mm), and 3 in (76 mm) in caliber respectively, firing 2-pound (0.91 kg), 6-pound (2.7 kg), and 12-pound (5.4 kg) shells. The 3-inch gun carried a pressure of 15 tons per square inch (2,109 kg per cm^{2}) when fired. Usually a Lewis machine gun was mounted on top of the Davis gun's barrel for use in sighting and as an auxiliary and anti-aircraft weapon.

== Aircraft used ==
The gun was tested on various aircraft and some aircraft were designed to carry the gun:

- Airco DH.4
- Armstrong-Whitworth FK.5 and FK.6 - "escort fighter" triplane
- Curtiss F5L - patrol flying boat used by US Navy
- Felixstowe Porte Baby - large flying boat
- Handley-Page O/100 - twin engined bombers with 6pdr Davis gun added for ground attack and anti-submarine
- Handley-Page O/400 - larger version of the O/400
- Naval Aircraft Factory N-1 - patrol floatplane designed by US Navy, four prototypes built, project canceled
- Short Type 184
- Short 310-B seaplane
- Pemberton-Billing PB.29E
- Pemberton-Billing PB.31E - long endurance anti-Zeppelin night fighter with 37mm Davis gun, prototypes only
- Robey-Peters RRF.25 Gun-carrier - two Davis guns. Single prototype for Royal Navy completed

== Surviving examples ==
There are examples at the Naval Aviation Museum at Pensacola, Florida, the Imperial War Museum in London, and the Kentucky Historical Society in Frankfort, Kentucky.

== See also ==
- COW 37 mm gun

== Bibliography ==
- Russell, Mark (2019). "Bring Out the Big Guns: British Military Aviation & the Development of the Heavy Cannon, 1914–39". The Aviation Historian (28): 60–69. ISSN 2051-1930.
