= Caudron C.23 =

French WW1 bomber aircraft

C.23
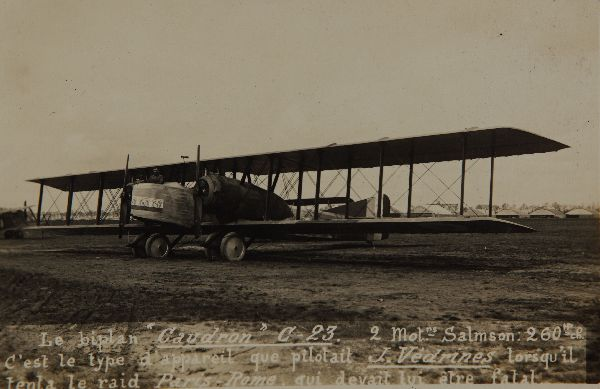

General information
- Type: Night bomber and transport aircraft
- National origin: France
- Manufacturer: Caudron
- Designer: Paul Deville
- Number built: 54

History
- First flight: February 1918

The Caudron C.23 was a French long range twin engine night bomber, flown in the last year of World War I. Post-war some machines were modified to carry passengers.

== Design and development ==
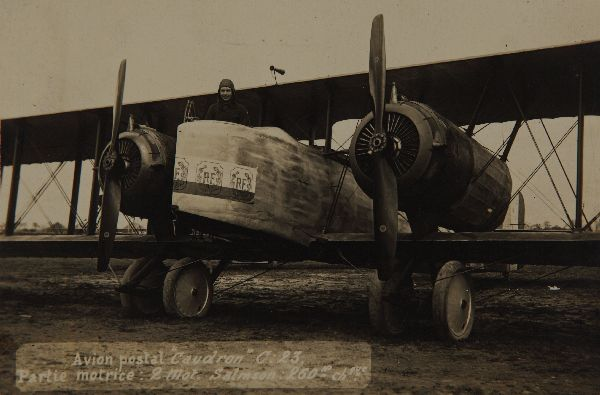
Caudron C.23

The C.23 BN.2 was designed to be a night bomber able to reach Berlin with a 600 kg (1,323 lb) bomb load. The French BN.2 military category indicated a two-seat night bomber but the C.23 had a crew of three. It had much in common with the Caudron C.22 but was almost 50% larger in span, requiring an extra bay and more powerful engines. It was a large five bay biplane, with fabric covered, constant chord, unswept wings with angled tips. The upper wing, which carried the ailerons, had a slightly greater (4%) span and a smaller chord. There was no stagger, so the sets of parallel interplane struts were vertical; flying wires braced each bay. Pairs of V-form engine bearing struts, which supported the two neatly cowled 194 kW (260 hp) Salmson 9Z nine cylinder water-cooled radial engines just above the lower wing, defined the inner two bays.

The C.23 had a flat sided fuselage. There was a gunner's position in the nose, equipped with twin Lewis guns. A roomy open cockpit was positioned under the wing leading edge, with a separate gunner's cockpit behind it under a large, rounded trailing edge cut-out. This was fitted with another pair of Lewis guns and a further gun firing downwards through a trapdoor in the floor. A low, broad fin carried a broad balanced rudder which extended down to the keel. The tailplane, angular in plan and of very low aspect ratio, was mounted on top of the fuselage and its elevators had cut-outs for rudder movement.

The bomber had a fixed tailskid undercarriage, with mainwheels in pairs, their axles mounted on longitudinal bars attached to the wing, under the engines, by N-form struts.

The Caudron C.23 first flew in February 1918, piloted by Jules Védrines. Higher power engines, the 447 kW (600 hp) Salmson 18Z or the 224 kW (300 hp) Hispano-Suiza 8Fb, were considered in April 1918 but the Salmson was not yet fully developed and trials with the Hispano led nowhere.

== Operational history ==
By the time of the Armistice in November 1918 fifty-four C.23s had been delivered to the French Air Force. Some served with the 22nd squadron until their replacement by the more powerful Farman Goliath in February 1920.

Very soon after the war some C.23s were modified to carry twelve passengers in an open cockpit formed by an opening between the cockpit and mid-upper gunner's position. On 10 February 1919 one made the first passenger flight between Paris and Brussels, carrying five passengers tightly packed together. One C.23, designated C.23 bis, was modified to carry fifteen passengers internally.

Jules Védrines and his engineer Guillian were killed in a C.23 when an engine failed whilst trying to establish a route from Paris to Rome.

== Variants ==
C.23 BN.2
bomber
C.23
12 seat transport
C.23 bis
15 seat cabin transport

== Operators ==
France

- French Air Force - 22nd squadron.

== Specifications (C.23 BN.2) ==
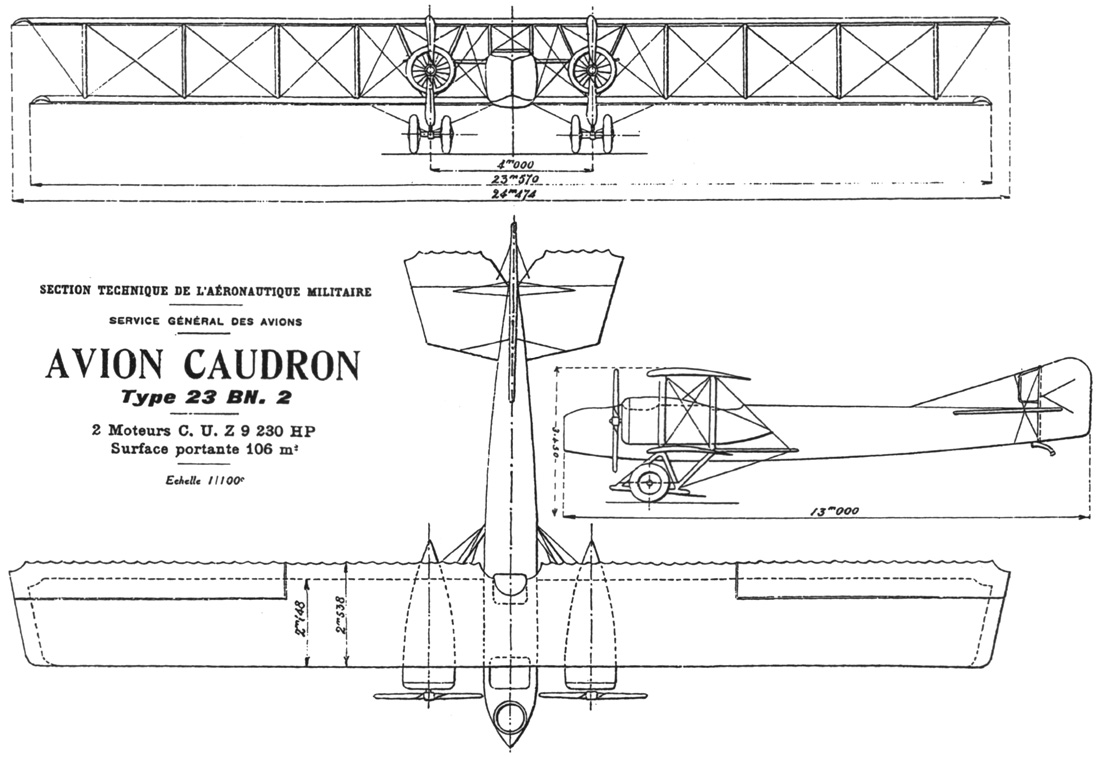
Caudron C.23 BN.2 drawing

Data from Hauet (2001) pp.139-141

General characteristics

- Crew: Three
- Length: 13.00 m (42 ft 8 in)
- Upper wingspan: 24.50 m (80 ft 5 in)
- Lower wingspan: 23.57 m (77 ft 4 in)
- Height: 3.40 m (11 ft 2 in)
- Wing area: 107 m^{2} (1,150 sq ft)
- Empty weight: 2,341 kg (5,161 lb)
- Gross weight: 4,170 kg (9,193 lb)
- Fuel capacity: 980 L (216 imp gal; 259 US gal) and 132 L (29 imp gal; 35 US gal)
- Powerplant: 2 × Salmson 9Z 9-cylinder water-cooled radials, 190 kW (260 hp) each
- Propellers: 2-bladed

Performance

- Maximum speed: 143 km/h (89 mph, 77 kn) at sea level
- Stall speed: 82.2 km/h (51.1 mph, 44.4 kn)
- Endurance: 6.75 hr
- Service ceiling: 3,500 m (11,500 ft)
- Time to altitude: 41 min to 4,000 m (13,123 ft)

Armament

- Defence: a pair of Lewis guns in nose and mid-upper positions, the latter a downward firing single machine gun.
- Bombload: 600 kg (1,323 lb)
