= Penetrator (aircraft) =

Long-range bomber aircraft

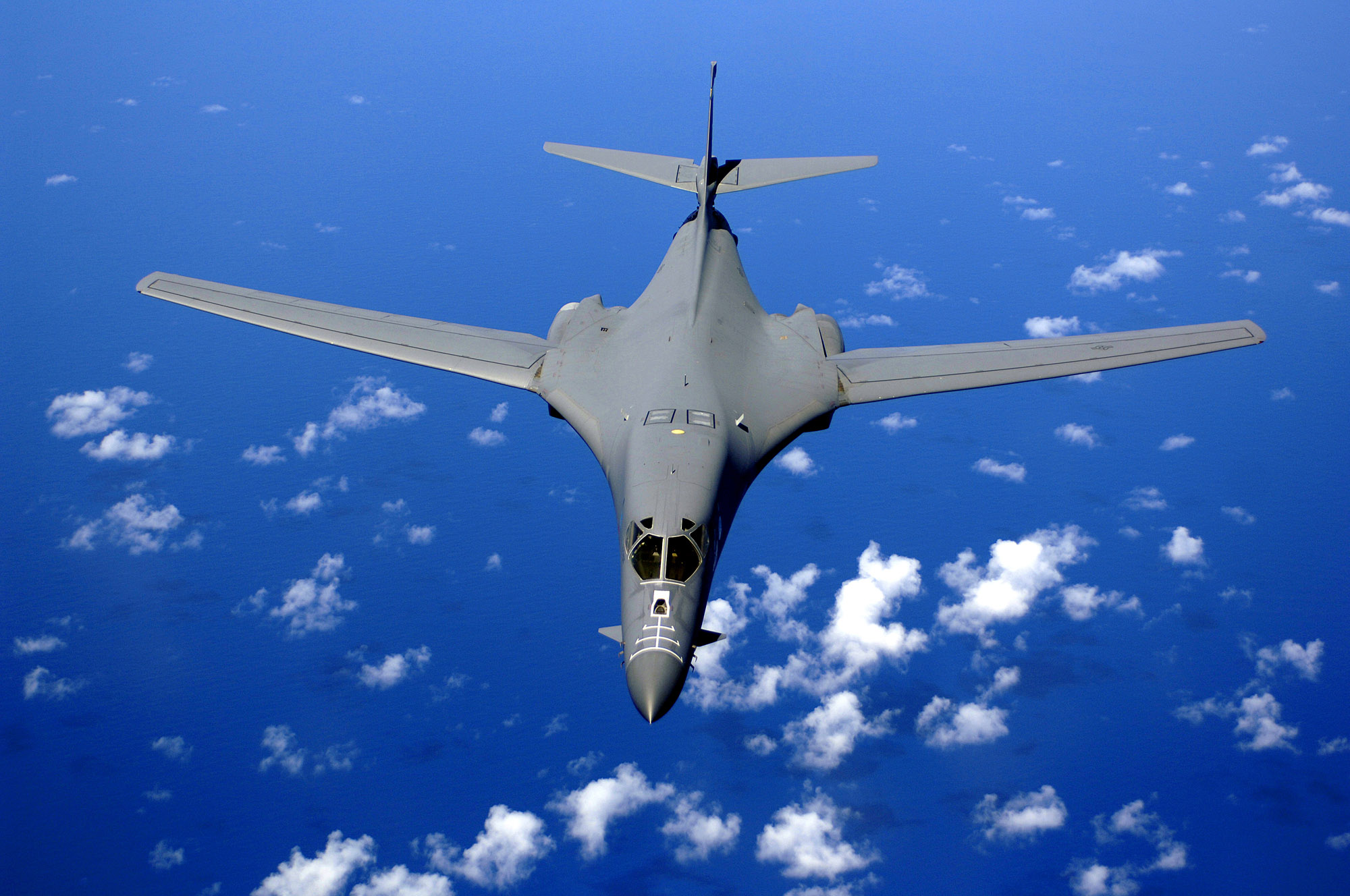
The Rockwell B-1 Lancer, the archetypal penetrator bomber.

A penetrator is a long-range bomber aircraft designed to intrude against and penetrate enemy defenses. The term is mostly applied to aircraft that fly at low altitude to avoid radar, a strategic counterpart to the shorter-ranged tactical interdictor designs like the TSR-2 and F-111 Aardvark. The term can be applied to any aircraft that is designed to survive over enemy airspace, and has been used for the penetration fighter designs intended to escort bombers.

The classic penetrator design is the Rockwell B-1 Lancer, where the term was first widely used. (Note: The B-1 was developed as part of a project known as the "Low-Altitude Manned Penetrator".) The larger Tupolev Tu-160 is also a member of this class. Other aircraft, like the Boeing B-52 Stratofortress and some versions of the F-111 have also been adapted to this role. More modern designs, like the Northrop Grumman B-2 Spirit, can be technically classified as penetrators, but the term is not generally applied to these aircraft. The mission for the Next-Generation Bomber has been described as "penetrate and persist".
