= Caudron C.22 =

French WW1 bomber aircraft

Caudron C.22 BN2

General information
- Type: Night bomber
- National origin: France
- Manufacturer: Caudron
- Designer: Paul Deville
- Number built: 1

History
- First flight: 1917
- Developed from: Caudron C.21

The Caudron C.22 was a French twin engine night bomber built in 1917. It did not reach production.

== Design ==
The C.22 BN2 was based on the earlier Caudron C.21, but scaled up. The span was increased by 22%, requiring an extra bay and more powerful engines. The French BN2 military category specified a two-seat night bomber.

It was a four bay biplane, with fabric covered, constant chord, unswept wings with angled tips. The upper wing, which carried the ailerons, had a 7% greater span and a smaller chord. There was no stagger, so the sets of parallel interplane struts were vertical; flying wires braced each bay. Pairs of V-form engine bearing struts which supported the two rotary engines above the lower wing defined the inner two bays. It was designed to be powered either by a pair of 89 kW (120 hp) Le Rhône 9Jb or 97 kW (130 hp) Clerget 9B nine-cylinder rotary engines. Ailerons were fitted only to the upper wing.

The C.22's fuselage was almost flat sided, with a vertical knife edge at the short nose. The crew had an extended cockpit under the wing, with the pilot under the leading edge and the second member under the trailing edge which had a deep cut-out to increase the field of fire from his defensive machine gun. At the rear the straight edged fin was long and low, carrying a straight edged, balanced rudder that extended down to the keel. An angular tailplane, mounted on top of the fuselage, had elevators with a cut-out for rudder movement.

The bomber had a tailskid undercarriage, with pairs of mainwheels on axles attached to longitudinal bars fixed under the engines on N-form struts. Its track was 3.24 m (10 ft 8 in). The C.22 could carry six 120 mm (4.7 in) and three155 mm (6.1 in) bombs.

The military preferred the Breguet 16 and the Farman F.50 for the night bomber role and the C.22 did not go into production. In February 1919, immediately after the end of World War I, the French proposed a commercial passenger service between Paris and London, using the C.22 and a Farman Goliath but the plans were rejected by the British authorities.

== Specifications ==
Data from Hauet (2001) p.137

General characteristics

- Crew: Two
- Length: 8.30 m (27 ft 3 in)
- Upper wingspan: 16.54 m (54 ft 3 in)
- Lower wingspan: 15.39 m (50 ft 6 in)
- Height: 2.52 m (8 ft 3 in)
- Wing area: 53 m^{2} (570 sq ft)
- Powerplant: 2 × 89 kW (120 hp) Le Rhône 9Jb or 97 kW (130 hp) Clerget 9B 9-cylinder air-cooled radials
- Propellers: 2-bladed

Armament

- Defensive: Machine gun in rear cockpit
- Bombs: 6×120 mm (4.7 in) and 3×155 mm (6.1 in)
