= Night bomber =

Type of bomber designed to operate at night

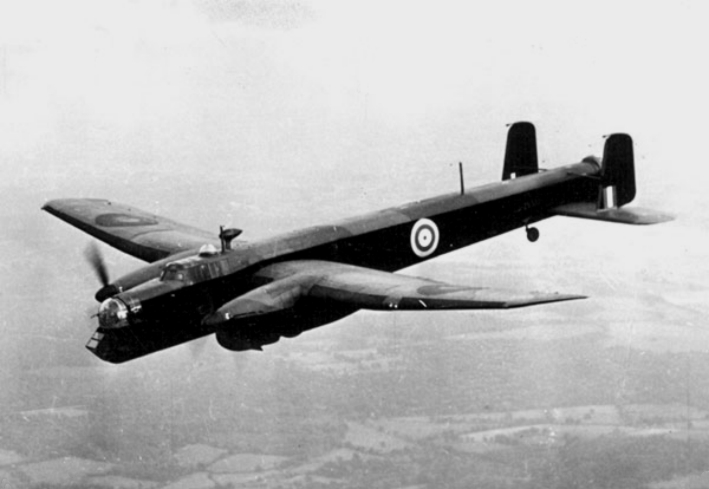
Armstrong Whitworth Whitley, a British night bomber, c. 1940.

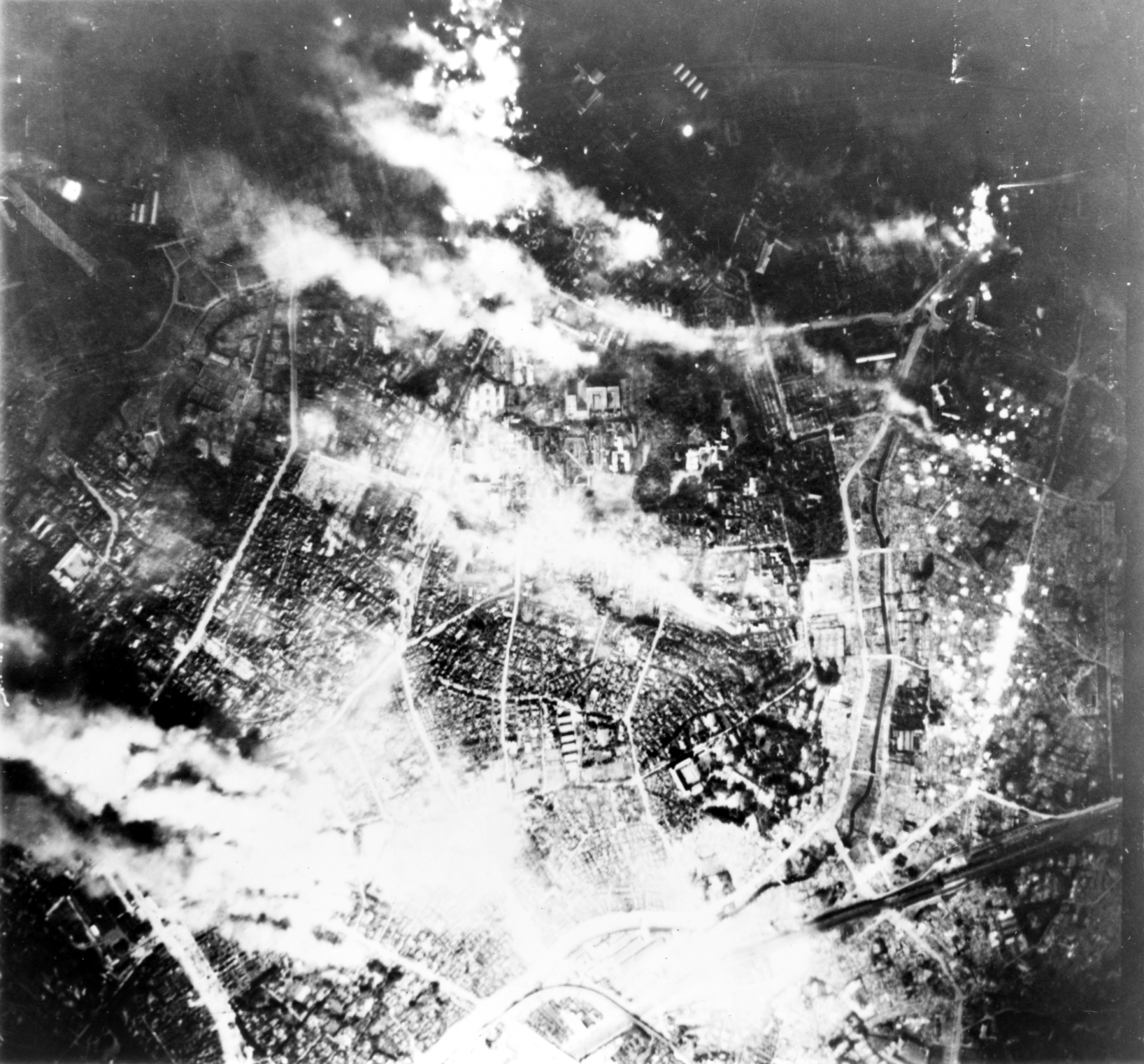
Bombing of Tokyo by Boeing B-29 Superfortresses with firebombs on the night of May 26, 1945.

A night bomber is a bomber aircraft intended specifically for carrying out bombing missions at night. The term is now mostly of historical significance. Night bombing began in World War I and was widespread during World War II. A number of modern aircraft types are designed primarily for nighttime bombing, but air forces no longer refer to them as night bombers. More common terms today include interdictor and strike fighter, and such aircraft tend to have all-weather, day-or-night capabilities.

== World War I ==
Strategic bombing and night bombing were new in World War I, and there was much experimentation at night with aircraft such as the Gotha G.IV, Gotha G.V, Handley Page Type O, and various giant airplanes such as the Riesenflugzeuge and the Sikorsky Ilya Muromets. Navigation was difficult and precision was almost nonexistent but the psychological effect was strong. Night bombing worked as a terror weapon.

Prior to the introduction of radar, aircraft flying at night were nearly impossible to locate accurately enough for attack. Acoustic location was used to obtain preliminary rough coordinates. Searchlights scanning the sky could illuminate aircraft by chance and might track them long enough for anti-aircraft artillery to fire a few shots. Alternatively, night fighters were used for interception; they either cooperated with searchlights or tried to spot the bombers in the moonlight. The success rate of such defences were so low that it was widely believed that "The bomber will always get through", in the words of British Prime Minister Stanley Baldwin. Since World War I, the bomber had been seen as a terror weapon, and was later seen as a primary strategic weapon of total war. As Baldwin later said, their primary purpose was to "kill the enemy's women and children more rapidly than they killed yours".

== Interwar period and World War II ==
As aircraft capabilities grew, so did their defensive firepower. By the mid-1930s, opinions were changing and the idea of daylight raids of aircraft providing their own self-defense came to the fore. In practice these aircraft proved entirely vulnerable to modern fighter aircraft and were rapidly returned to the night bombing role. However, these aircraft had not been designed for night navigation, and were generally lacking any effectiveness in these missions:

I don't think we realized at the time that our equipment wasn't really up to it. They'd forgotten to design or produce any navigation equipment, so the Wellington bomber, which was intended to be a day bomber, had to operate at night because it was so vulnerable during the day. It had virtually the same equipment that the Tiger Moth had, with one exception—the Wellington had a loop aerial. Here we were flying 500 or 600 miles over enemy territory, trying to locate a target in total blackout, often with cloud below us and a lot of industrial haze. It's not surprising that our bombers were 5, 10 miles away. There was no bomber stream. We were largely on our own, perhaps 10 or 14 aircraft at intervals.

—John Gee, Bomber Command pilot

The USAAF was the only force to press ahead with daylight strategic bombing raids during World War II. This proved as disastrous as the earlier Royal Air Force and Luftwaffe attempts, and had to be called off in late 1943. The arrival of the P-51 Mustang fighter in the "bomber escort" role allowed these missions to start again in 1944, and the fighter was so successful that the Luftwaffe fighter force was almost wiped out by the end of spring. Later on, the RAF also began to take part in daylight bombing raids as well, cementing the defeat.

The USAAF also applied the same concept with the bombing raids against Japan in June 1944-early 1945 with daylight precision bombing against Japanese industrial facilities using Boeing B-29 Superfortress heavy bombers. However, the results weren't successful because of the frequent jetstream blowing the high explosives off target, navigation problems, anti-aircraft fire, and searchlights, resulting in high losses among the B-29 crewmen. As a result, in February 1945, the USAAF switched to low-level incendiary raids against Japanese cities, most of them took place at night. The most devastating air raid in the war was the firebombing of Tokyo on the night of March 9–10, 1945, which destroyed 16 square miles, killed 100,000 Japanese, and made a million people homeless.
