= Naval Aircraft Factory N-1 =

Canceled U.S. Navy maritime patrol aircraft

N-1 Davis Gun Carrier
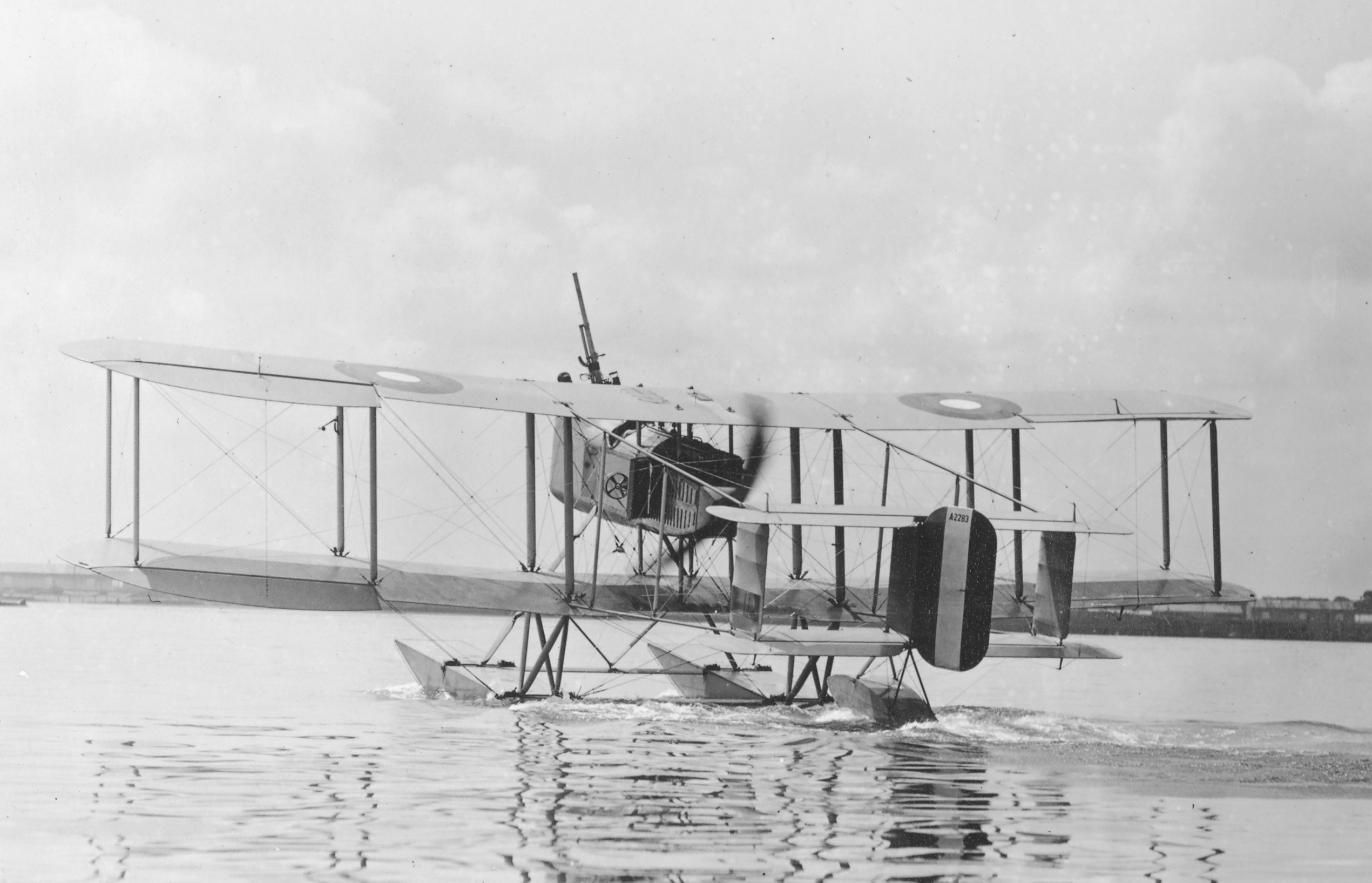

General information
- Type: Maritime patrol aircraft
- National origin: United States
- Manufacturer: Naval Aircraft Factory
- Designer: Jerome Clarke Hunsaker
- Status: Canceled
- Primary user: United States Navy
- Number built: 4

History
- Manufactured: 1918
- First flight: 22 May 1918

The Naval Aircraft Factory N-1 or Davis Gun Carrier was a 1918 maritime patrol aircraft built by the Naval Aircraft Factory (NAF), the in-house aircraft production arm of the United States Navy. A floatplane of biplane configuration with a single Liberty L-12 engine driving a pusher propeller, it was the first aircraft to be both designed and built by the NAF, and was designed to carry the Davis gun, the first recoilless gun. The first prototype crashed during its maiden flight due to poorly designed floats but was rebuilt. However, the aircraft's performance did not meet expectations, and navy leaders canceled the program after 2 of the 4 prototypes were subsequently damaged in serious crashes.

== Specifications ==
Data from Wings for the Navy

General characteristics

- Crew: 2
- Wing area: 694 sq ft (64.5 m^{2})
- Max takeoff weight: 5,900 lb (2,676 kg)
- Powerplant: 1 × Liberty L-12 water-cooled 45° V-12 piston engine, 360 hp (270 kW) with pusher propeller

Performance

- Maximum speed: 94 mph (151 km/h, 82 kn)

Armament

- Guns: 1 x Davis gun

== Bibliography ==
- Trimble, William F. (1990). Wings for the Navy: A History of the Naval Aircraft Factory, 1917-1956 (1st ed.). Annapolis, Maryland: Naval Institute Press. ISBN 0-87021-663-5.
