= Robey & Co =

British engineering company

Robey & Co.
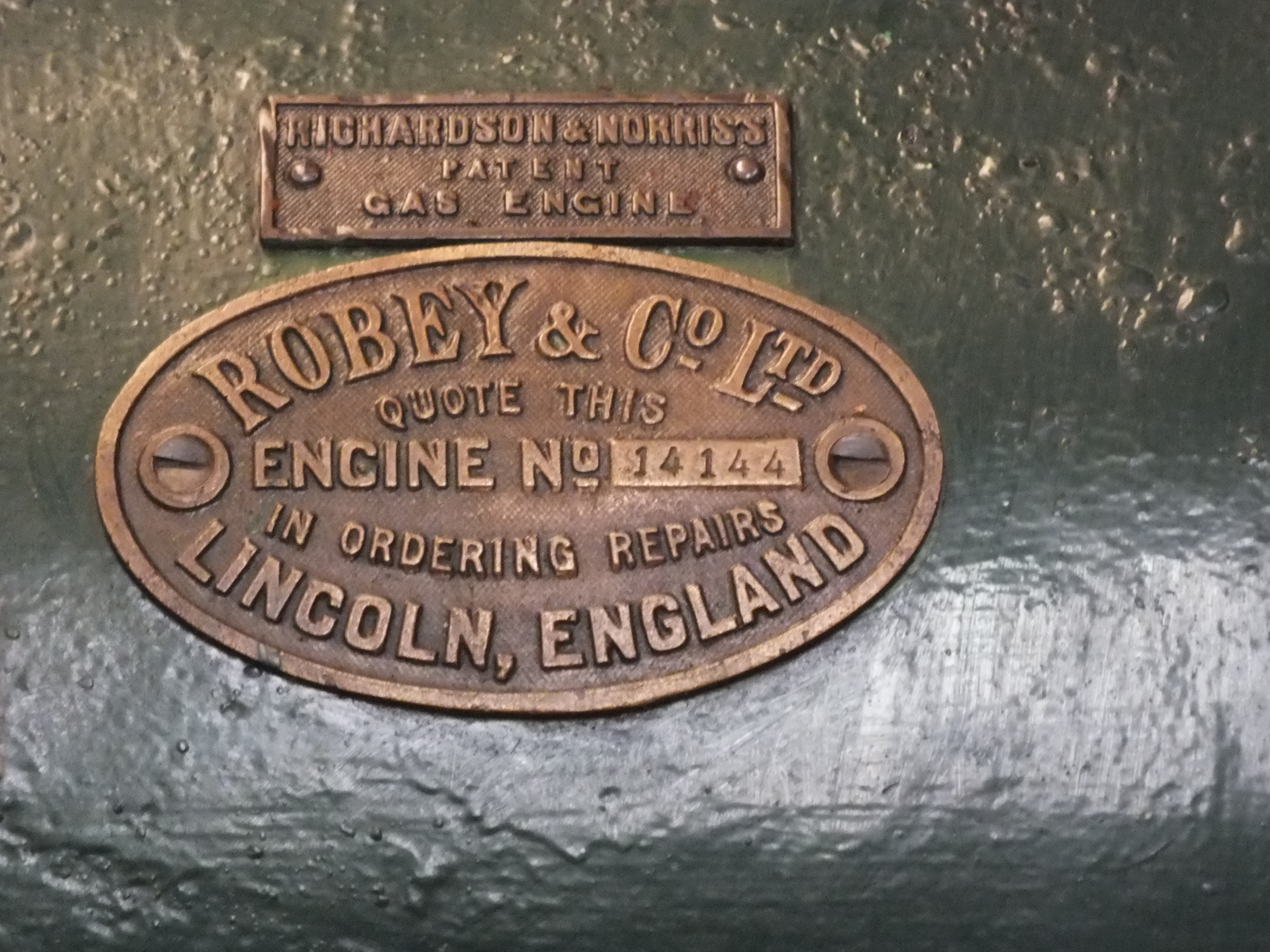
- Robey engine plate Type 4P 14144 Gas Engine, built in 1895
- Industry: Engineering
- Defunct: 1988
- Successor: Babcock International
- Key people: Robert Robey, John Richardson.
- Products: Steam engines

Robey and Co. was an engineering company based in Lincoln, England, which can be traced back to around 1849.

In 1854 Watkinson and Robey Engineers and Millwrights were manufacturing portable engines and machinery of every description in Rumbold Street, Lincoln. They were joined by George Lamb Scott, but in 1855 Watkinson, who had previously worked for Clayton & Shuttleworth of Lincoln, left the company. The business then became Robey and Scott and moved their premises by 1856 to Canwick Road, Lincoln. Another partner, Thomas Gamble, joined the firm and Scott resigned in September 1856 to found his own manufacturing company in Manchester. The company then became Gamble & Robey, but by 1868 was known as Robey & Co Ltd.

Robert Robey died in 1876 and the firm continued as a partnership led by John Richardson. In 1893 Robey & Co became a limited company. By 1913 Robeys were makers of steam motor wagons, tractors and ploughs and in the First World War manufactured aircraft. The company was purchased by Babcock International in 1984.

== Robey’s engineering products ==
=== Threshing machines ===
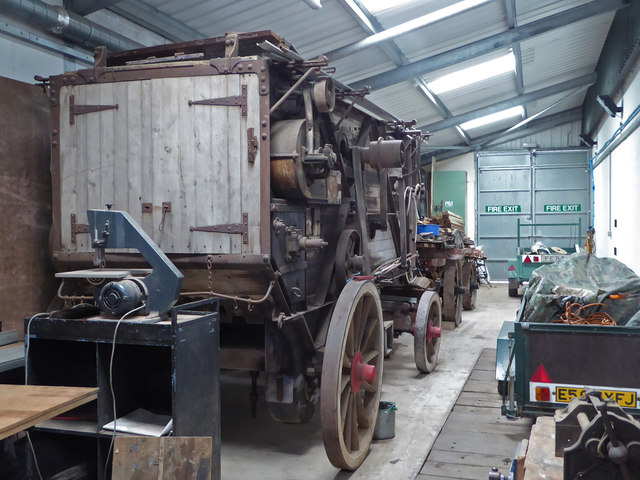
Robey Trust, Tavistock - threshing machine

Threshing machines were one of the mainstays of Robeys products. In 1859 an impressive threshing machine was exhibited at the Manchester and Liverpool Agricultural Show. Threshing machines continued to be made until the 1930s and were often sold with portable engines or traction engines to drive them. Threshing machines developed little in design over this period. They were often also sold with elevators. The Robey Trust in Tavistock has threshing machine No. 3331 of c1880 and is the oldest known surviving Robey threshing machine.

=== Portable engines ===
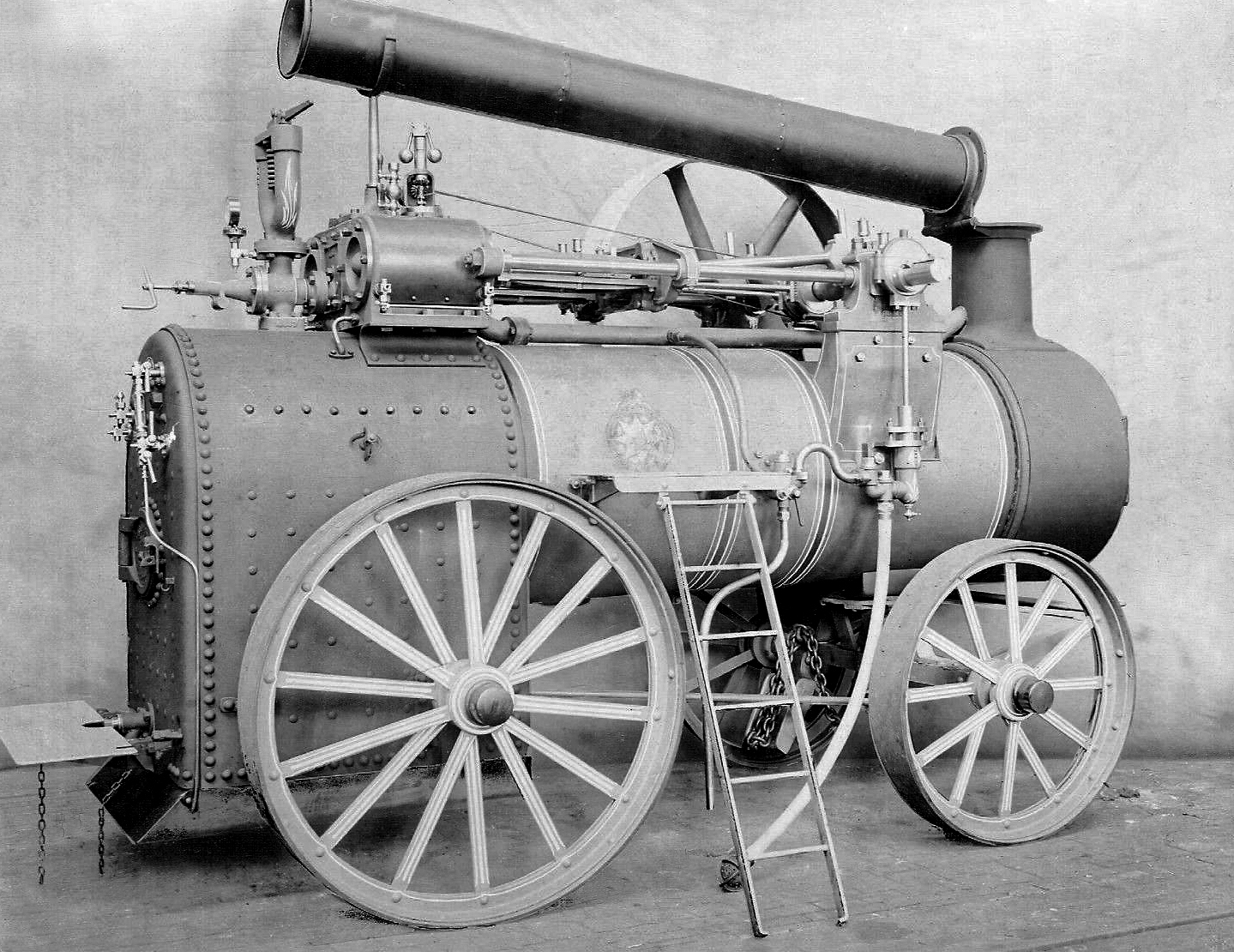
Messrs. Robey & Co Ltd, Lincoln portable compound engine 1890s

An early report of a Robey portable engine was in July 1855 when the Stamford Mercury reported Messrs. Robey and Scott, of St. Rumbold's lane Foundry, on Monday 1st sent off for the Crimea a tenhorse power high pressure portable steam-engine. It single-cylinder engine, and ……would be adapted to bear the rough usage it will have to encounter. It understood that to be put to the various purposes and to supply the troops with bread. Portable engines continued to be made until the 1940s. It was from portable engines that traction engines were developed.

=== Robey traction engines ===
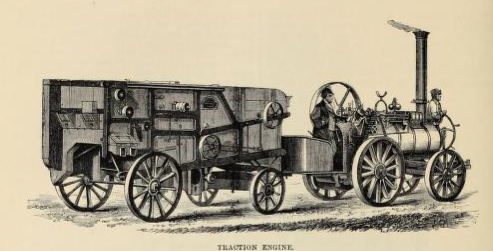
Robey Traction engine towing a thrashing machine 1862

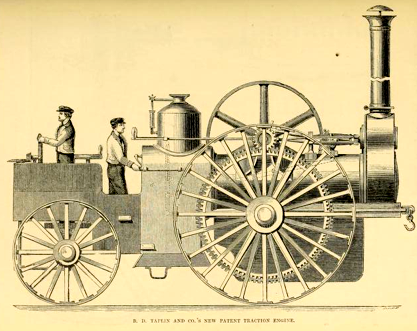
Taplin Lincoln Traction Engine 1862

Robeys were in the forefront of traction engine development. The idea that a portable engine could be converted to drive itself under its own power evolved around 1859. The traction engine, in the form recognisable today, developed partly from an experiment in 1859 when Thomas Aveling modified a Clayton & Shuttleworth portable to become self-propelled by fitting a long driving chain between the crankshaft and the rear axle. Lincoln manufacturers rapidly developed this idea. Robey's first design was to develop a traction engine steered by a man in front of the boiler. This was displayed at the International Exhibition of 1862 and the illustration shows the traction engine towing a thrashing machine. At the same Exhibition Benjamin Dutton Taplin who had an iron foundry by St Peter at Gowts in Lincoln, showed a traction engine of the form that became standard. Also in May that year a Traction engine described as Taplin, Robey and Co. was exhibited at the Bath and West Show. Taplin, who appears to have been too ambitious in the development of his business, had become insolvent at the end of May and it seems likely that Robey had acquired his stock in trade. Robeys continued to produce traction engines that could be steered by a man at the front and a traction engine of this type was exhibited by Robeys at Manchester in 1869.

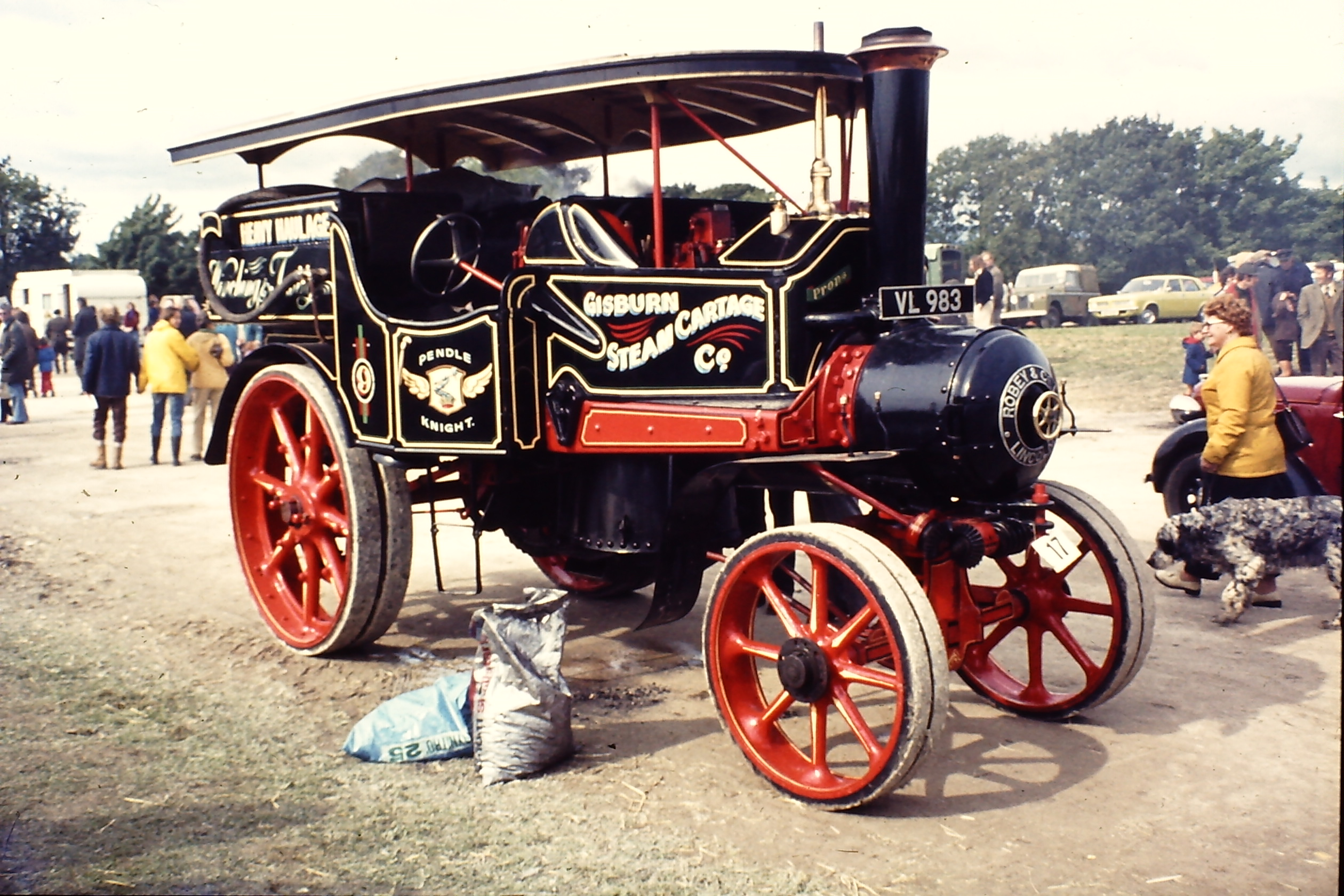
Robey steam tractor, Pendle Knight

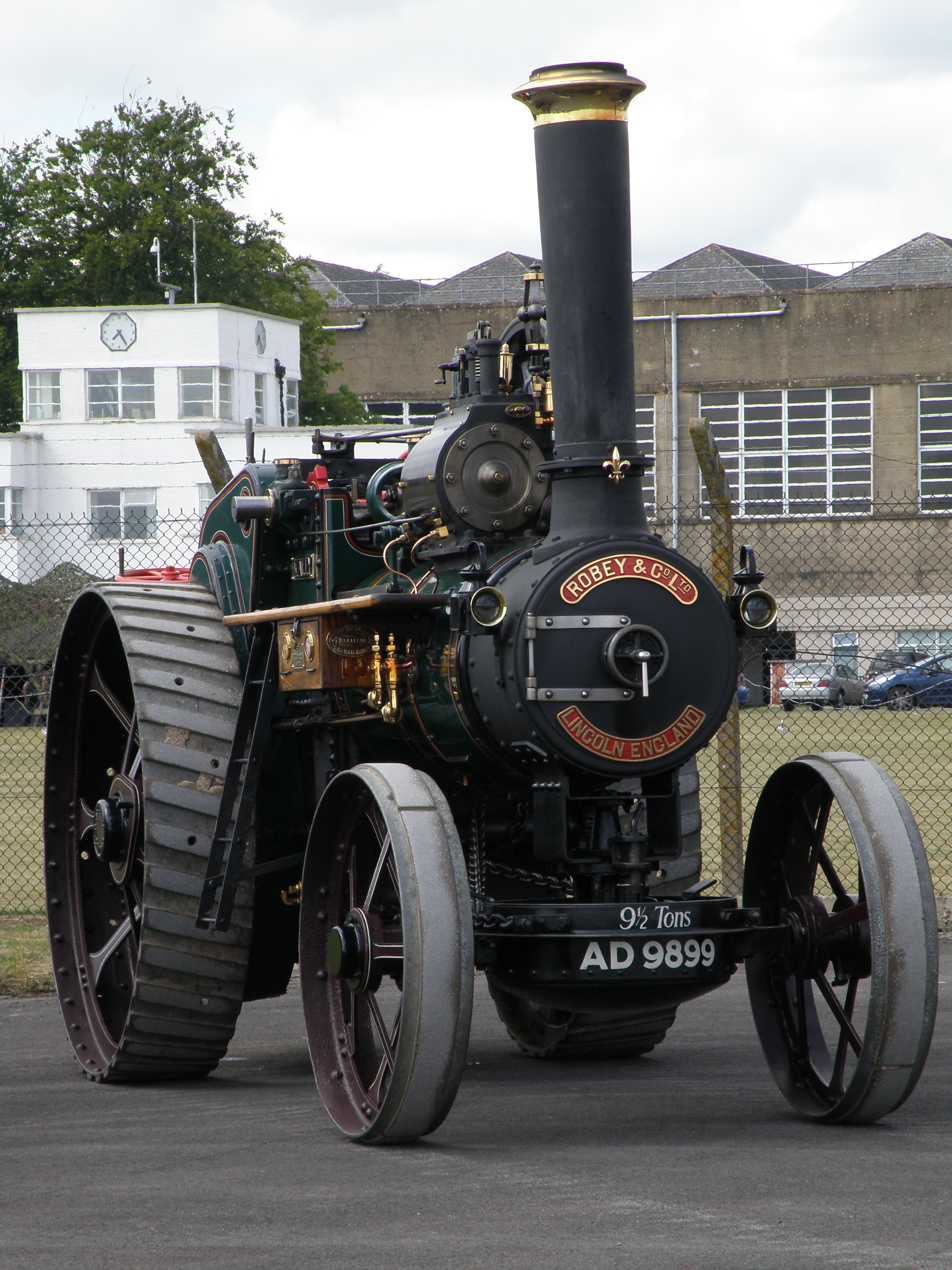
Robey traction engine

By 1875 the Traction engine exhibited at the Smithfield Show was of the more conventional type and around 1879 Robey's made a number of Box's Patent Traction engines. Box's Patent engines had an ingenious device to raise the rear driving wheel of the traction engine and these engines were used particularly for longer distance road transport. Robeys continued traction engine and steam tractor manufacturing well into the 20th. century.

== Road steam vehicles ==
Robey road locomotive Advance, 1870

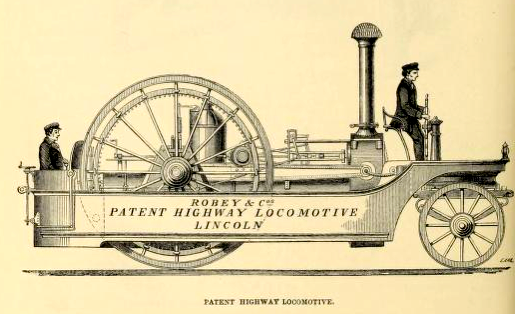
Robey patent highway locomotive 1862

Robeys were pioneers in developing road steamers. In 1862 an illustration was included in illustrated catalogue of the Industrial Department of the International Exhibition of 1862 of Robeys' Patent Highway Locomotive. No information is given about its specifications.

Later Robey steam road locomotives were based on the use of R.W.Thomson's patent solid India-rubber tyres, which were encased in articulated metal shoes. Their use massively increased the contact area of the wheels with the ground, doubling the load a vehicle could haul and enabling it to cross soft ground. Initially Thomson licensed the whole package of the design of the road steamer (a vertical superheating "pot"-boiler and a two-cylinder engine) as well as the tyres and the shoes. They were used to draw passenger vehicles on roads or for heavy haulage.

Robey's first road locomotive with Thomson's tyres was the 'Advance', commissioned by the Woolwich Arsenal in 1870. Trials were carried out in December 1870. For the first test a covered wagon and an omnibus were attached to the steamer at Robey's works in Canwick Road, and, with a load of 45 passengers, proceeded at a smart pace — not less than six miles an hour —over the iron bridge over the Witham, and up Lindum Hill, a gradient of one in nine achieving a speed of between four and five miles. The 'Advance' then turned on the hill-top with its train in a circle and the run down the hill, which is a full half- mile, was made at times at a great speed, the crowd of sight-seers all running to keep up with it. A second test used two four-wheeled trucks, each weighing three tons and carrying loads of two tons. The 'Advance' was then driven up Canwick Hill, to the south of Lincoln, a gradient of one in eight. The purpose of this experiment was to show the capacity of the Steamer for drawing heavy loads on ordinary roads and was successfully accomplished. A later test in July, 1871, used another road steamer, which was made to draw two large omnibuses, filled with passengers, from Lincoln to Grantham, and the trip was completed satisfactorily.

Over the next two years Robeys built 32 of these vehicles, which were either 8 or 12 horse power versions. As the Locomotive Acts restricted road locomotives to 4 mph (2 mph in towns), sales in the UK went only for use on private land. Most were exported. These included three to Vienna and others to Ireland, Italy, Greece, Moscow, New Zealand, Australia and Chile. A further Thomson steam vehicle was built in 1877, but apart from traction engines, Robeys appear to have discontinued making steam road vehicles until 1904, when they started manufacturing steam road lorries.

=== Railway steam engines ===
Between 1876-84 six steam railway engines were produced. From 1889 to 1924 two narrow gauge engines “Joubert’’ and ‘‘Kruger’’ were used on the Oriental & Sheba valley railway in Transvaal. Similar engines went via the agent Rose Innes to Chile.

=== Robey steam rollers ===
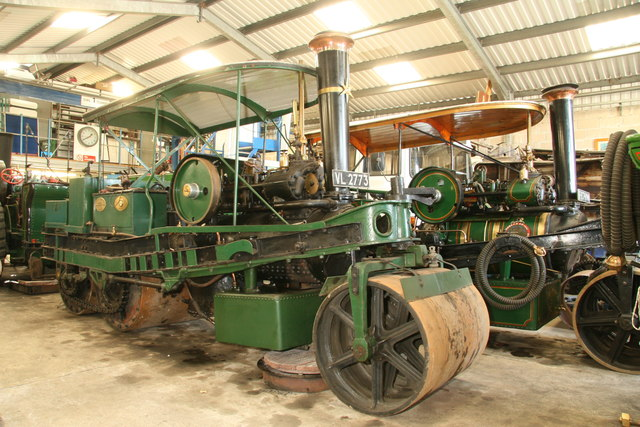
Tri-tandem roller preserved by the Robey Trust

Robey & Co produced their first steamroller in 1913. Robey's steam rollers were produced mainly after the First World War. Various Australian municipalities imported the Robey 10 T rollers between 1923 and 1927.

Robey's first tandem roller was sold in 1921. Robey's last steamroller was sold and exported to India in 1934. The first Robey & Co roller works number 32387 survived into preservation. Between 1935 and 1938, three tandem rollers were converted into "tri-tandem" machines by Wirksworth Quarries Ltd, by extending the frames and adding a second roller at the rear. Two of these rollers are preserved, including one owned by the Robey Trust.

=== Robey steam wagons ===
Robey were very early in developing steam road vehicles and started developing steam wagons 1906.

=== Tipper steam wagon ===
Around 1925 Robey's won a contact for the supply of steam tipper lorries to Ceylon. Robey Steam Lorry 42888 survives at Training Centre, Ratmalana Works in Ceylon.

== Engines for other purposes ==
=== Engines for generating electricity ===
Robeys were a leading company in the field of electric generating engines. Robeys introduced electric lighting into their Canwick Road factory in 1880.

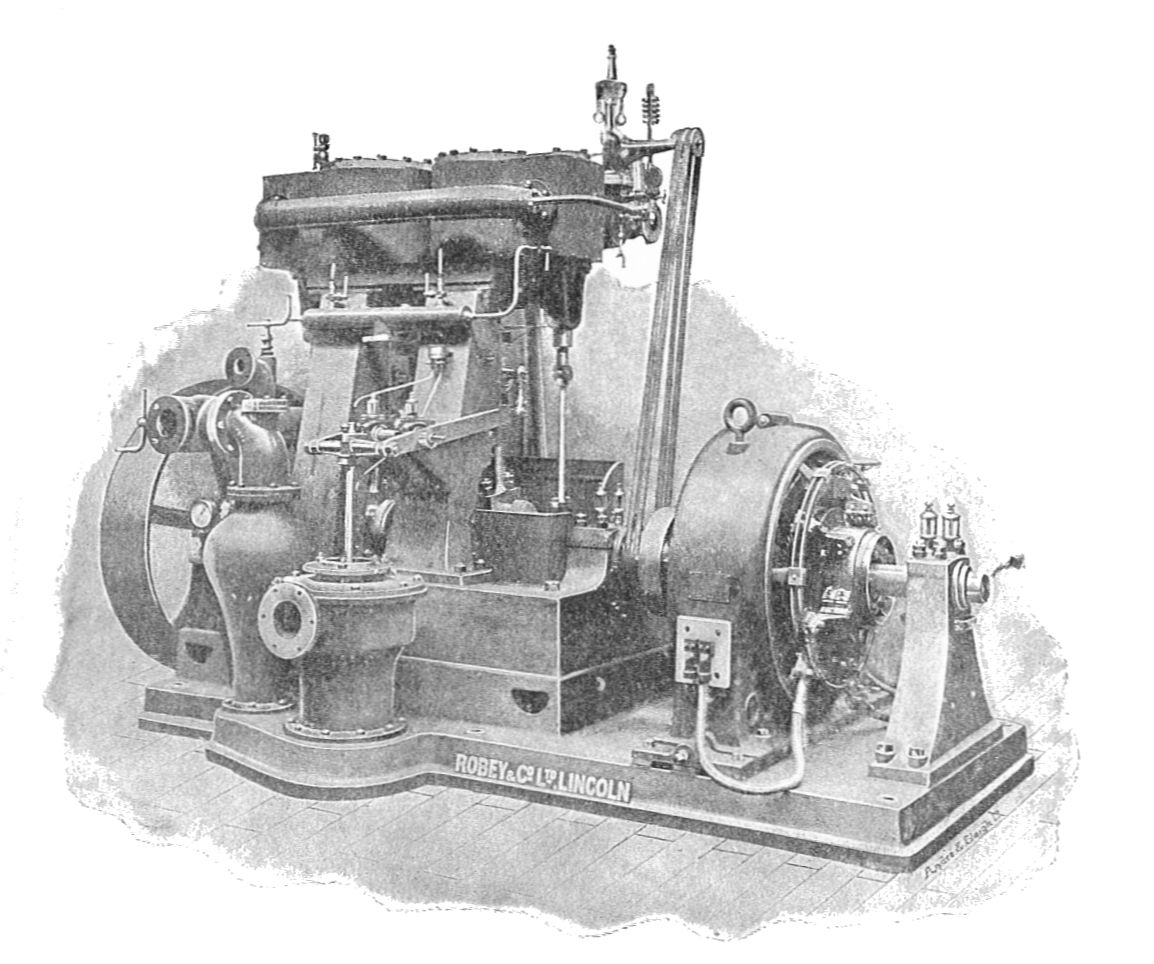
Robey - Westinghouse generating set (Rankin Kennedy, Electrical Installations, Vol III, 1903)

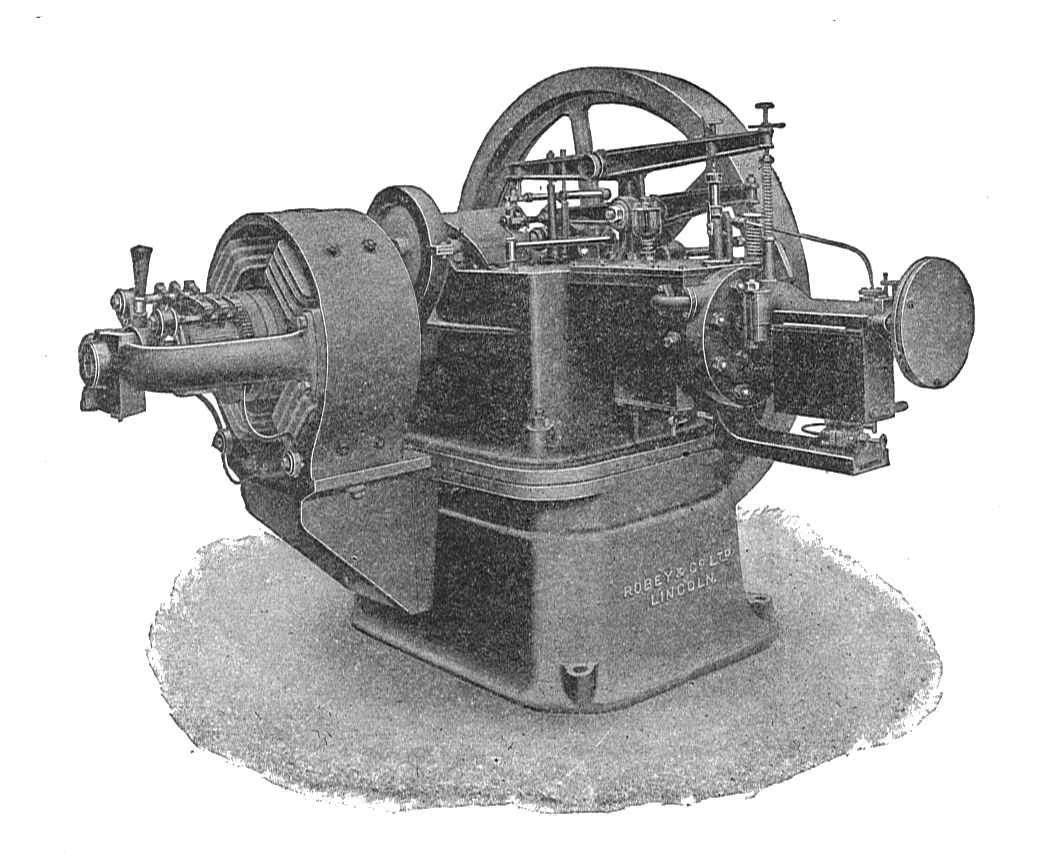
Robey combined engine and dynamo (Rankin Kennedy, Modern Engines, Vol II)

=== Engines driving looms in textile factories ===
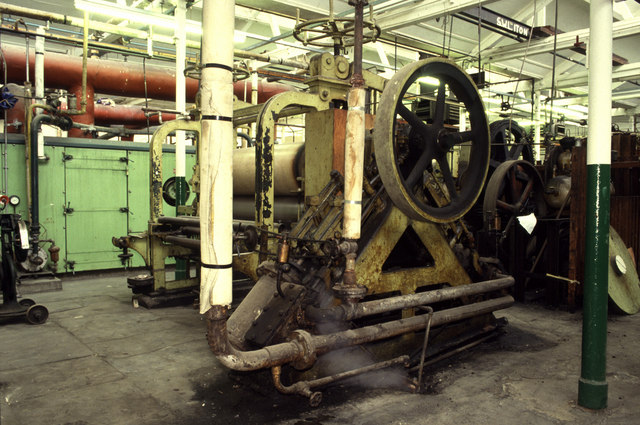
Steam engine, Lower Heys Mill

- Steam engine, Lower Heys Mill. The Barracks Fabric Printing Co Ltd, Lower Heys Mill, Black Lane, Macclesfield. The last working steam engine in the textile industry in the UK. Twin cylinder diagonal driving a calender. Built by Robey of Lincoln in 1913. Stopped 1995 and removed to Dingles museum in 1996 and later acquired by the Robey Trust.

=== Winding engines ===
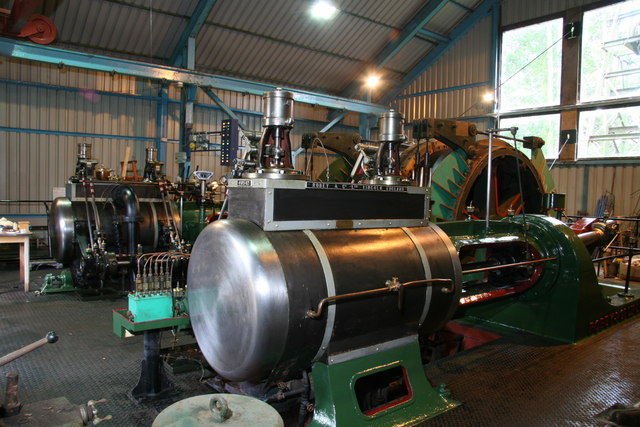
Papplewick Pumping Station, steam winding engine. - geograph.org.uk - 1777442

These were used as winding engines in collieries. Robey's had developed winding engines by 1894 when an article and illustration of a Robey Compound Underground Hauling Engine was published in 'The Engineer'. An example steam of a winding engine is now at Papplewick Pumping Station. It was built by Robey in 1922 with a horizontal duplex steam winding engine. It was used at Linby Colliery and, although the smaller of the two steam winders, was the coal-puller. It was a fast engine and continued in use until 1982. It was moved to Papplewick in 1983. It is fully restored and runs more or less as it would have been in service. It is one of very few surviving duplex winders and the only one that can be seen operating.

== First World War aircraft production ==
In addition to licence-built designs, Robey designed and built the Robey-Peters Gun-Carrier for the Royal Naval Air Service (RNAS). This large 3-seat fighter was ordered by the RNAS in 1916 and the first prototype took off on its maiden flight at Bracebridge Heath in May 1917. The aircraft crashed and was not repaired, with the second machine remaining uncompleted.

== Second World War and post-war production ==
Production from 1939 centred on gun mountings, frigate engines and other heavy items. After the war the capacity and expertise of the company was used to fabricate everything from converters for steelworks to parts for the Jodrell Bank radio telescope. In the firm's last years before final closure in February 1988, production was mainly of boilers in oil, gas or solid fuel fired versions which were made in larger numbers.

== Robeys Works, Canwick Road, Lincoln ==
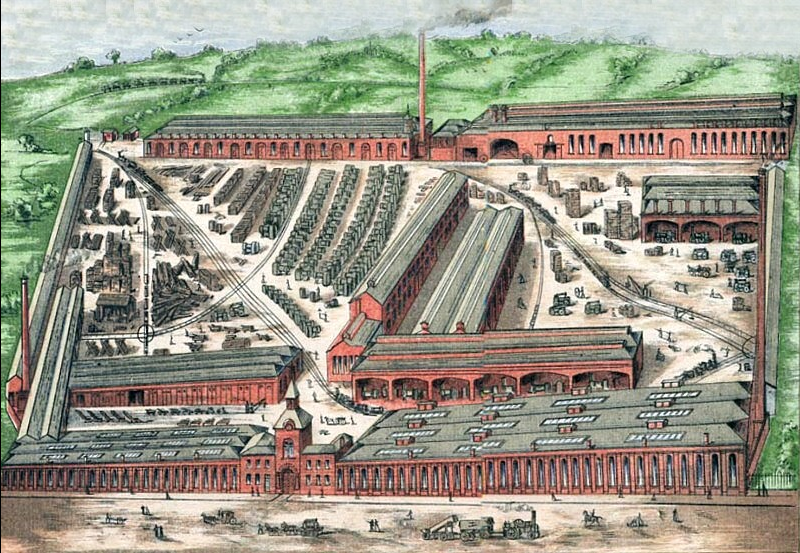
Robey Lincoln Factory 1879

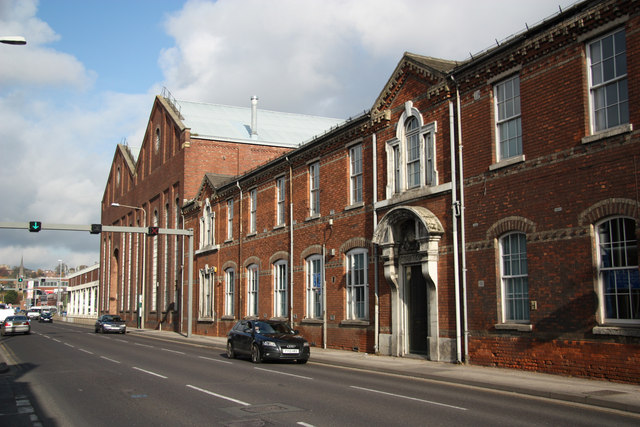
Robeys Globe Works, Canwick Road, Lincoln

Robeys rapidly became an important employer in Lincoln and by 1865 were employing 114 men. The works covered a total area along Canwick Road of seven acres and around 1870 the name of Perseverance Ironworks was changed to the Globe Works. The layout of the works is shown in a print of 1879 The facade on the Canwick Road originally had a large entrance way surmounted by a tower. This may have been designed by the Lincoln architect William Watkins. Watkins had designed an extension to the factory in 1873. Watkins had also been architect for a large house built for Robert Robey, overlooking the nearby South Park. A new fitting shop had been added in 1871 In 1883 a Coffee Palace and Workmen Mess rooms were built on the opposite side of Canwick Road. The main entrance on Canwick Road, surmounted with a globe above the door must date from about 1910. The site was developed over the next few years. A cooling tower was built in 1912

During the First World War considerable additions were made, including new workshops on the Canwick Road and on the Coultham Street side. Some were to designs by the architect F. W. Horton. A new power house with chimney was added in 1915 A shop and offices for aircraft production were added on the Canwick Road side at a late stage in the war

== Robey Trust ==
The Robey Trust is based in Tavistock at the New Perseverance Ironworks. It is a charity dedicated to continuing the traditions of the Robey Engineering Company of Lincoln. This involves not only the maintenance in working order of many Robey engines, the vast majority of them steam engines, but also continuing and transmitting to coming generations the expertise required to preserve and run these machines. The trust was formed as the result of the acquisition of the Robey Tandem Steam roller No 42693 which was rescued from a children's playground in 1983. This was the first engine to be owned and restored by the Robey trust. The Trust also possess other steam rollers including a Tri-tandem No 45655. This engine was built in 1930 and was working for long enough to help construct Britain's first motorway, the M1. The Trust also has in its collections stationary engines and a Robey 6-ton Steam Wagon (no 42522) made in 1924. The Trust holds a growing archive of historical and technical publications, drawings and photographs and is always pleased to receive items to add to the collection or to copy and return. A 'Robey Register' is being compiled to record details of Robey manufactures known to exist worldwide.

== Literature ==
- Brooks R. (Undated, but 1988), Lincolnshire Engines Worldwide, Lincolnshire Life Museum, Lincolnshire County Council. ISBN 086-1111362
- Clarke R.H. 2nd imp. (1998)Steam Engine Builders of Lincolnshire. Society for Lincolnshire History and Archaeology. ISBN 090-3582120
- Southworth P J M (1986) Some Early Robey Steam Engines. ISBN 978-0951185605
- Walls J. & Parker C. (2000), Aircraft made in Lincoln. Society for Lincolnshire History and Archaeology. ISBN 9780903582162
