= Interdictor =

Type of attack aircraft

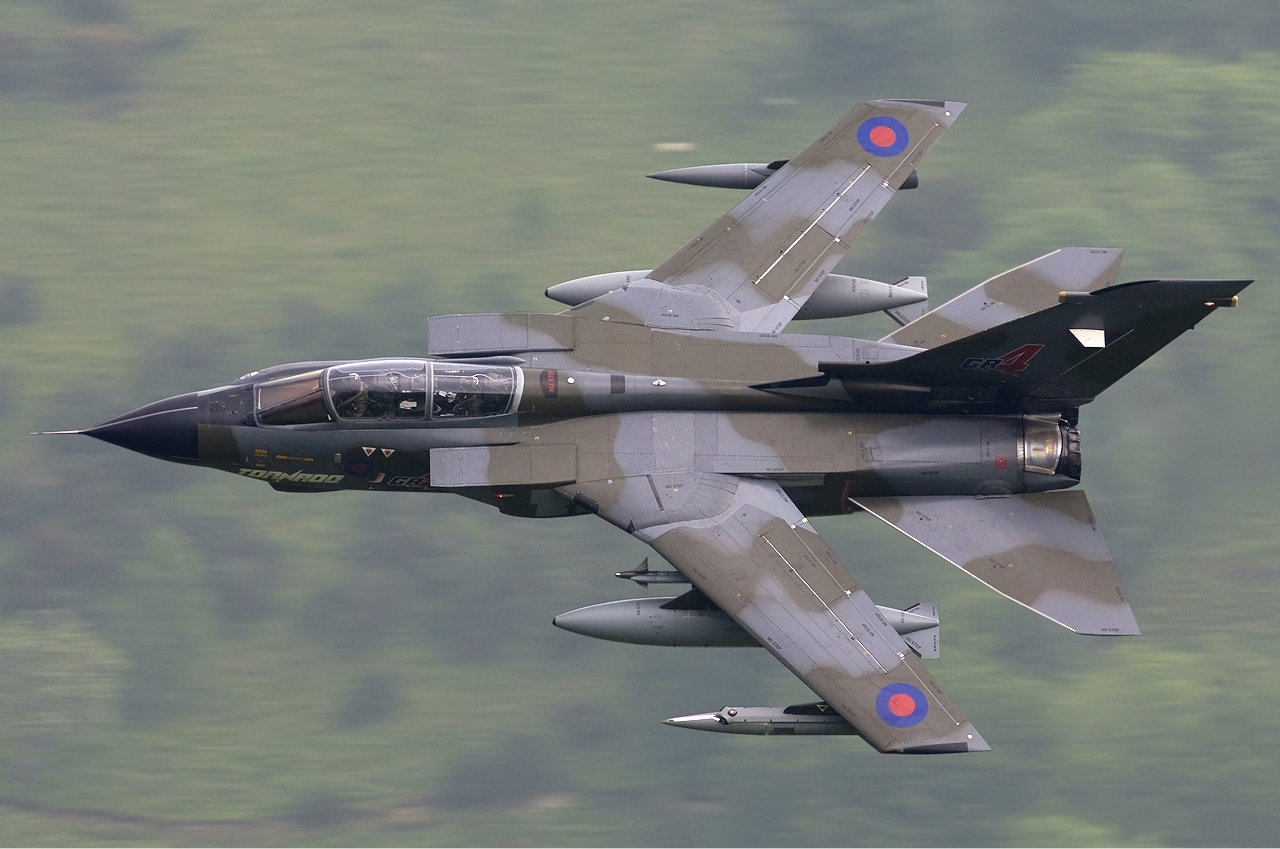
An RAF Panavia Tornado GR4 flying through Mach Loop

An interdictor is a type of attack aircraft or tactical bomber that operates far behind enemy lines, with the express intent of air interdiction of the enemy's military targets, most notably those involved in logistics.

== Interdiction ==
Interdiction prevents or delays enemy forces and supplies from reaching the battlefront; the term has generally fallen from use. The strike fighter is a closely related concept, but puts more emphasis on air-to-air combat capabilities as a multirole combat aircraft. Larger versions of the interdictor concept are generally referred to as "penetrators".

== Operation ==
In the post-war era, the RAF introduced interdictor variants of their English Electric Canberra jet bomber, as aircraft were released from the strategic bombing role as they were replaced by the new V bombers. Desiring a more modern aircraft for this role, development of the BAC TSR-2 (from "Tactical Strike and Reconnaissance, Mach 2") began, but this program was later cancelled. The US began development of a similar aircraft around the same time, which emerged as the General Dynamics F-111. The failure of the TSR-2 and a desire by other European nations for a similar design led to the Multi Role Combat Aircraft (MRCA) program, although operating over shorter ranges in the European theatre which was realised as the Panavia Tornado Interdictor/Strike (IDS). The Soviet Sukhoi Su-24 emerged in the early 1970s.

In order to safely traverse a heavily defended front line, they flew at very low altitudes (in some cases having to pull up to clear power lines) to use terrain masking to protect them from enemy radar-guided weapons. Flying at low altitude also demands much greater fuel consumption, and thus interdictor aircraft were generally fairly large.

== List of interdictor aircraft ==
- North American A-5 Vigilante – (United States)
- Republic F-105 Thunderchief – (United States)
- General Dynamics F-111 Aardvark – (United States)
- BAC TSR-2 – (United Kingdom) - did not enter service
- Panavia Tornado – (United Kingdom, West Germany, Italy)
- Sukhoi Su-24 – (Soviet Union, Russia)
- English Electric Canberra – (United Kingdom)
- Xi'an JH-7 – (China)

== See also ==
- Air interdiction
- Bomber
- Interceptor aircraft
- Schnellbomber
