= Sopwith L.R.T.Tr. =

British WW1 triplane escort fighter aircraft

L.R.T.Tr.

General information
- Type: Escort fighter
- National origin: United Kingdom
- Manufacturer: Sopwith
- Status: Prototype
- Number built: 1

History
- First flight: 1916

The Sopwith Long Range Tractor Triplane (L.R.T.Tr) was a prototype British long-range three-seat triplane escort fighter of the First World War. Its unusual layout had a small gunner's nacelle mounted on the upper wing for an all-round field of fire. Only a single example was built, as other, smaller fighters proved more practicable.

== Development and design ==
In early 1916, the British War Office drew up a specification for a multi-seat escort fighter to be powered by one of the new Rolls-Royce Eagle engines, intended to protect formations of bombers from German fighters, with an additional role of destroying enemy airships. While the specification did not require high speed, a good field of fire for its guns was essential, while the secondary anti-Zeppelin role demanded an endurance of at least seven hours.

Orders were placed for prototypes from Armstrong Whitworth (the F.K.6), Sopwith and Vickers (the F.B.11). All three designs were driven by the need to provide wide fields of fire in the absence of an effective synchronisation gear that would allow safe firing of guns through the propeller disc.

The Sopwith proposal was modified from an existing design for a two-seat triplane, with a nacelle for a gunner added to the upper wing. It had three-bay, narrow chord wings, with the streamlined nacelle housing the upper gunner who was armed with a Lewis gun built around the centre section of the upper wing. Ailerons were fitted to all wings, with air brakes fitted to the lower wing. The deep fuselage housed the pilot and a second gunner to guard the aircraft's tail. Balancing wheels were fitted well ahead of the aircraft's mainwheels in order to prevent the aircraft overturning, as the upper gunner would be extremely vulnerable if this occurred.

The prototype, which was nicknamed "Egg-Box", flew late in 1916. It was not developed further, with smaller fighters fitted with synchronisation gear such as Sopwith's own 1½ Strutter now available, with all of the proposed three-seat escort fighters abandoned.

== Specifications (L.R.T.Tr.) ==
Data from War Planes of the First World War:Volume Two Fighters

General characteristics

- Crew: 3 (pilot and 2 gunners)
- Length: 35 ft 3 in (10.74 m)
- Height: 52 ft 9 in (16.08 m)
- Powerplant: 1 × Rolls-Royce Eagle water-cooled V12 engine, 250 hp (190 kW)

Performance

- Maximum speed: 107 mph (172 km/h, 93 kn) (approx.)

Armament

- Guns:
  - 1× .303 in (7.7 mm) Lewis gun in nacelle
  - 1× Lewis gun in rear cockpit

== See also ==
Aircraft of comparable role, configuration, and era

- Armstrong Whitworth F.K.6
- Vickers F.B.11
