= Vickers F.B.11 =

Prototype British three-seat escort fighter of the First World War

F.B.11
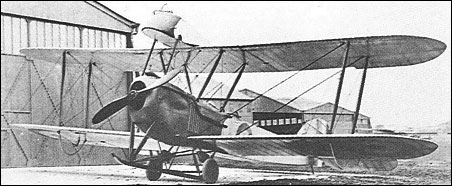

General information
- Type: Escort fighter
- National origin: United Kingdom
- Manufacturer: Vickers Limited
- Designer: R. L Howard-Flanders
- Number built: 1

History
- First flight: 1916

The Vickers F.B.11 was a prototype British three-seat escort fighter of the First World War. A large single-engined biplane, it carried one gunner in a nacelle mounted on the upper wing to give an allround field of fire. Only a single example was completed.

== Development and design ==
In early 1916, the British War Office drew up a specification for a multi-seat escort fighter to be powered by one of the new Rolls-Royce Eagle engines, intended to protect formations of bombers from German fighters such as the Fokker E.I, with an additional role of destroying enemy airships. While the specification did not require high speed, a good field of fire for its guns was essential, while the secondary anti-Zeppelin role demanded an endurance of at least seven hours.

Orders were placed for prototypes from Armstrong Whitworth (the F.K.6), Sopwith (the L.R.T.Tr.) and Vickers. All three designs were driven by the need to provide wide fields of fire in the absence of an effective synchronisation gear that would allow safe firing of guns through the propeller disc.

The Vickers response, the F.B.11, designed by R. L. Howard-Flanders, was a large, single-bay, biplane of tractor layout. The pilot and one gunner sat in separate but closely spaced cockpits under the trailing edge of the upper wing, while a second gunner sat in a nacelle, or "fighting top", attached to, and extending forward of the upper wing. The Eagle engine was mounted in a clean cowling, with the radiator fitted behind the engine in the fuselage.

Two prototypes were ordered, with the first flying in September–October 1916, being tested at RNAS Eastchurch in November that year. It proved to have poor lateral control and performance, and was destroyed in a crash. The second prototype was not completed, and as effective synchronising gears were now available (including Vickers' own Vickers-Challenger gear), none of the escort fighters were developed further.

== Specifications ==
Data from War Planes of the First World War:Volume Three Fighters

General characteristics

- Crew: three (pilot and two gunners)
- Length: 43 ft 0 in (13.11 m)
- Wingspan: 51 ft 0 in (15.54 m)
- Height: 13 ft 8 in (4.17 m)
- Wing area: 845 sq ft (78.5 m^{2})
- Empty weight: 3,340 lb (1,515 kg)
- Gross weight: 4,934 lb (2,238 kg)
- Powerplant: 1 × Rolls-Royce Eagle III water-cooled V-12, 250 hp (190 kW)

Performance

- Maximum speed: 96 mph (154 km/h, 83 kn) at 5,000 ft (1,500 m)
- Endurance: 7.5 hr
- Service ceiling: 11,000 ft (3,400 m)
- Time to altitude:
  - 16 min to 5,000 ft (1,500 m)
  - 55 min to 10,000 ft (3,000 m)

Armament

- Guns: 1× .303 in (7.7 mm) Lewis gun in nacelle, 1× Lewis gun in rear gunners cockpit

== See also ==
- Armstrong Whitworth F.K.6
- Sopwith L.R.T.Tr.
