= Armstrong Whitworth F.K.6 =

F.K.6

General information
- Type: Escort fighter
- National origin: United Kingdom
- Manufacturer: Armstrong Whitworth
- Designer: Frederick Koolhoven
- Number built: 2

History
- First flight: 1916

The Armstrong Whitworth F.K.5 and F.K.6 were experimental triplanes built as escort fighters by Armstrong Whitworth during the First World War. They carried two gunners in nacelles mounted on the centre wing. One example of each type was built, with no further development or production following.

== Development and design ==
In early 1916, the British War Office drew up a specification for a multi-seat escort fighter to be powered by one of the new Rolls-Royce Eagle engines, with an endurance of at least seven hours, intended to protect formations of bombers from German fighters such as the Fokker E.I, with an additional role of destroying enemy airships. Orders were placed for prototypes from Armstrong Whitworth, Sopwith and Vickers, all of which were of unconventional design owing to the need to give their gunners a good field of fire in the absence of an effective synchronisation gear to allow guns to be fired safely though the propeller disc.

=== F.K.5 ===
Armstrong Whitworth's chief designer, Frederick Koolhoven's first design to meet this requirement, probably designated F.K.5, was a large, single-engined tractor triplane with the middle wing having a much greater span than the upper and lower wings. The gunners were housed in two long nacelles mounted on top of the middle wing, allowing them to be seated ahead of the propeller disc, with the pilot's cockpit situated behind the wings in the slim central fuselage, giving a poor view. The undercarriage consisted of a sprung strut carrying two mainwheels underneath the engine, with two stabilising wheels at the wingtips of the lower wing, with a tailskid just aft of the trailing edge of the lower wing. This design never flew, with the head of Armstrong Whitworth's Aircraft department, I. Fairbairn-Crawford, forbidding test flights.

=== F.K.6 ===
Koolhoven completely reworked the design to produce the F.K.6. While still a triplane with the middle wing of significantly greater span than the upper and lower wings, it was larger, with two-bay wings. This time, the gunner's nacelles were slung under the middle wing and were shorter, so that the gunners sat behind and outboard the propeller (and less than 2 ft (0.6 m) from the exhaust manifold). The fuselage was much deeper than the F.K.5, filling the gap between the middle and lower wings, giving a slightly better view, while the undercarriage had two pairs of wheels with a narrow track under the fuselage and a more conventional tailskid.

Four examples of the F.K.6 were ordered in April 1916, two of which were intended for the Royal Naval Air Service, but only one was built, this demonstrating poor performance when tested. As effective synchronising gears were now available, the type was abandoned, with none of the escort fighters being brought into production.

== Specifications (F.K.6) ==
Data from War Planes of the First World War: Volume One

General characteristics

- Crew: 3
- Length: 37 ft 0 3/4 in (11.297 m)
- Wingspan: 62 ft 0 in (18.90 m)
- Height: 17 ft 0 in (5.18 m)
- Powerplant: 1 × Rolls-Royce Eagle water-cooled V-12 engine, 250 hp (190 kW)

Armament

- Guns: 2× .303 in Lewis guns, one in each nacelle

== See also ==
Aircraft of comparable role, configuration, and era

- Sopwith L.R.T.Tr.
- Vickers F.B.11
